= Disappearance of Jorge Julio López =

2006 missing person case

Jorge López
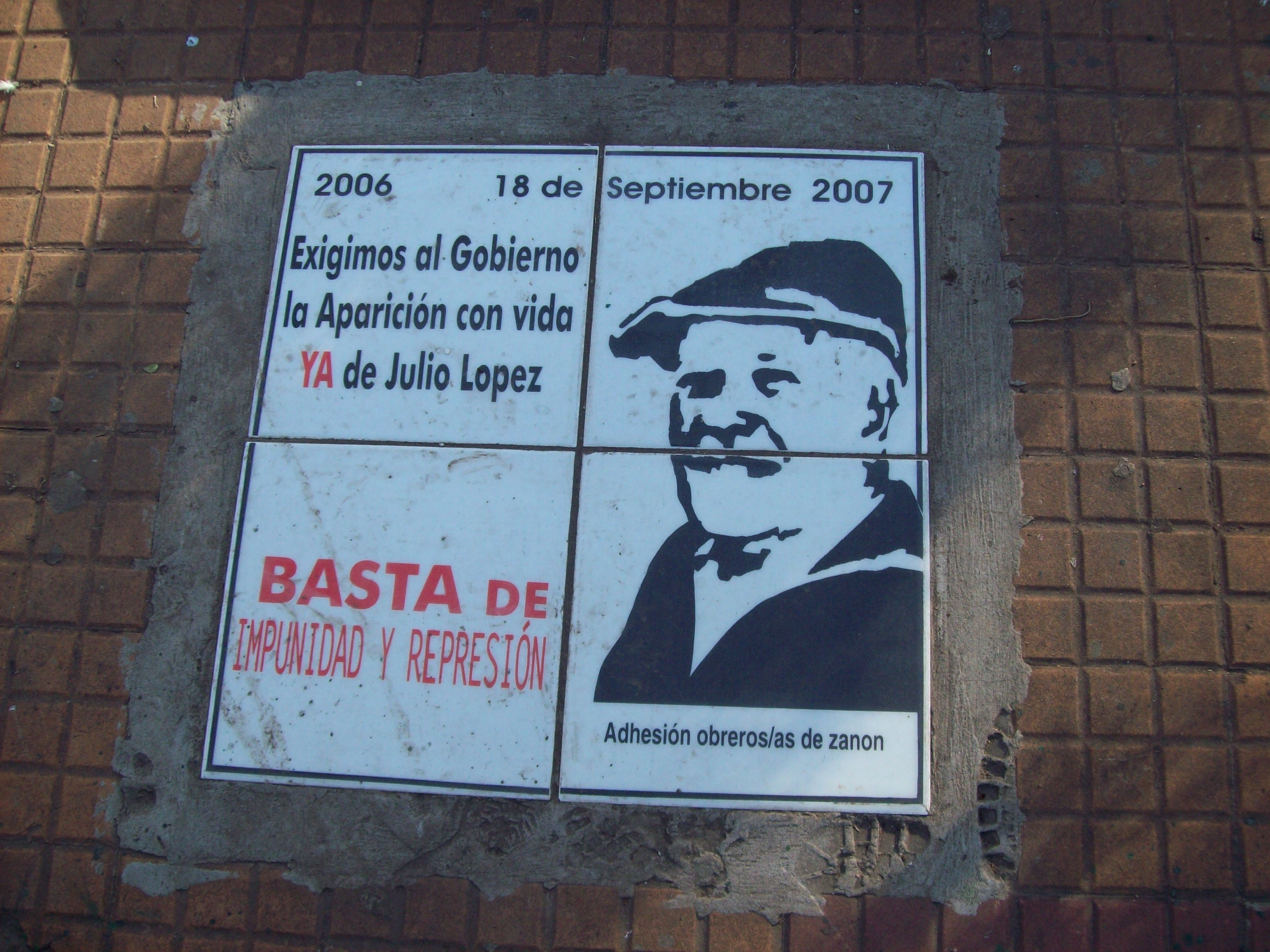
- Mural depicting the missing López
- Born: Jorge Julio López; 25 November 1929; Buenos Aires Province, Argentina
- Disappeared: 17 September 2006 (aged 76–77); La Plata, Buenos Aires, Argentina
- Status: Missing for 19 years, 11 months and 24 days
- Occupation: Bricklayer
- Height: 1.70 m (5 ft 7 in)

Jorge Julio López (Latin American Spanish: [ˈlopes]; born 1929 - last seen 09 September, 2006) is an Argentine retired bricklayer who was kidnapped during the National Reorganization Process of the late 1970s and early '80s, and who disappeared again in 2006 after testifying in the trial against police officer Miguel Etchecolatz who was facing charges related to his role in the dirty war of 1970s Argentina.

No trace of López has been found despite extensive investigation, and several theories have been advanced to explain his disappearance ranging from health problems to revenge by those he testified against.

== Trial witness and disappearance ==
López was kidnapped and taken to different clandestine detention centers during the Argentine dictatorship known as the National Reorganization Process (1976–1983). He was subject to torture and remained detained without formal charges or trial from 21 October 1976 until 25 June 1979. About thirty years after the end of the military government, the laws known as Due Obedience and Full Stop, which blocked investigations of crimes committed by members of the military and the police during the dictatorship, were repealed. Miguel Etchecolatz was the first defendant in a Dirty War-related trial.

During the first part of the National Reorganization Process, Etchecolatz was the Director of Investigations of the Buenos Aires Provincial Police, head of one of the clandestine detention centers, and the right hand of former General Ramón Camps. López was a key witness in his trial. His testimony involved 62 military and policemen, and thanks in part to this, Etchecolatz was sentenced to life imprisonment.

Lopez "disappeared just hours before he was slated to give his final testimony on the eve of the conviction of the former police investigator," on 18 September 2006, according to the story "Missing Witness Awakens Dark Past," by Marie Trigona of the Americas Program of the International Relations Center published on 12 October 2006. He was last seen at his home in the city of La Plata, 40 km. south of Buenos Aires. The initial hypothesis, that assumed that López had suffered a traumatic shock when reliving his torture during the trial and had subsequently wandered off lost, was discarded. Another hypothesis, that he had gone voluntarily into hiding fearing retribution for his statement against Etchecolatz, was discredited as well.

== Investigation and criticism ==
Government officials made repeated assurances of optimism regarding a quick reappearance, based on "substantial advances" in the investigation, though evidence of this progress has not been presented to the public. The apparent laziness of the investigators, added to this lack of visible progress, has led some to suspect that information is being withheld or even that there is state complicity in the disappearance.

On 8 January 2007, National Deputy Nora Ginzburg proposed a law to create a special bicameral commission to keep Congress informed about the development of the investigations related to López, as well as those regarding the kidnapping and later reappearance of Luis Gerez (also a former victim of the dictatorship). The proposal was not adopted.

On 15 February Ginzburg made another proposal, requesting that the Executive report information about the cases. This proposal was not adopted either. On 27 February Ginzburg repeated her first proposal; the president of the Chamber of Deputies, Alberto Ballestrini, refused it but allowed voting on the second project. It was rejected 118–47, with the opposition of the president's party faction, the Front for Victory, and Federal Peronism.

The disappearance of the bricklayer sparked criticism of witness protection procedures. After the disappearance, the government of Buenos Aires raised the reward for information on López to AR$200,000 (about US$66,000 at the time), and soon doubled the figure. Many television and radio requests for information were broadcast, and pictures of López were posted in many places. There was a campaign using mobile phone text messages asking for collaboration on the search. Thousands of policemen were mobilized.

As of 2 February 2010, over three years after his disappearance, López is yet to be found, but retired police doctor Carlos Osvaldo Falcone, who visited Etchecolatz in prison days before Lopez's disappearance, is to be questioned about the use of a car found at his home reported to have been used to kidnap Lopez.

Early in 2011, a witness claimed that Lopez's body was buried in the Pereyra Iraola railway station, but the witness was considered unreliable. Suspicions about the cause of López's disappearance were strengthened in 2014, when Miguel Etchecolatz and 14 others were convicted in a trial addressing crimes committed at the 'La Cacha' clandestine detention centre, the place where, among others, Laura Carlotto, the daughter of the head of the Grandmothers of the Plaza de Mayo, Estela de Carlotto, was held. As the judge handed down sentences, Etchecolatz took a piece of paper and wrote on it: "Jorge Julio López." The moment was captured by photographers and when the images were inspected, the other side of the piece of paper could also be read. It said the missing person's name, again, along with the addition of one other word: "Kidnap."

As of 2026, Jorge Julio López remains missing.

== See also ==
- List of kidnappings
- List of people who disappeared mysteriously (2000–present)
- Luciano Arruga
