= Beatriz H. C. Aicardi de Neuhaus =

Argentine human rights activist

- Born: Beatriz Haydée Catalina Aicardi; 12 January 1925
- Occupation: Activist
- Years active: 1977–?
- Spouse: Axel Neuhaus (died)
- Children: At least 2

Beatriz Haydée Catalina Aicardi de Neuhaus (born Beatriz Haydée Catalina Aicardi on 12 January 1925, date of death unknown) was an Argentine human rights activist, and one of the twelve founders of the association Grandmothers of Plaza de Mayo.

== Biography ==
On 16 March 1976, eight days before the establishment of the military dictatorship calling itself the National Reorganization Process (1976-1983), her daughter Beatriz Haydee Neuhaus de Martinis, who was four months pregnant with her son-in-law, was kidnapped and disappeared. Juan Francisco Martinis.

For more than a year she looked for them alone. At the beginning of 1977 she joined the group of mothers and relatives who began to meet at the Plaza de Mayo, which later became known as Mothers of the Plaza de Mayo. In October 1977, she received the invitation of Alicia Zubasnabar de De la Cuadra, also a participant in the rounds of the Mothers, to form a special group of grandmothers looking for their missing grandchildren. She was one of the twelve founding women of Grandmothers of Plaza de Mayo. Her granddaughter is still missing.

Neuhaus is deceased.

== Grandmothers of Plaza de Mayo ==
The coup d'etat of 24 March 1976 established a terrorist regime that had as its axis the forced disappearance of the opponents and the imposition of a climate of terror destined to avoid any claim; the mere fact of asking about the whereabouts of a detained-disappeared relative was risky and could result in detention-disappearance. At that time the situation of hopelessness and helplessness of the relatives of the disappeared persons was extreme, since that no democracy in the world, or the Catholic Church, with great influence in the country, or international humanitarian organizations, was willing to condemn the atrocities committed by the military regime and, on the contrary, in some cases they cooperated with illegal repression. Nor was it possible to resort to the judicial system, since Argentine judges systematically rejected legal action remedies.

Under these conditions, a group of mothers, fathers and relatives of the disappeared initiated a movement of nonviolent resistance, which would become historic. The proposal came from Azucena Villaflor, then disappeared and murdered by the dictatorship:

We have to go directly to the Plaza de Mayo and stay there until they give us an answer.

On 30 April 1977, they began to march every Thursday around the May Pyramid, in the plaza of the same name, located opposite the government house. To attract attention, the women decided to cover their hair with a White handkerchief. The group quickly received the name of Mothers of the Plaza de Mayo and by their very presence began to exert national and international pressure on the fate of women. people who disappeared in Argentina. Initially the military regime tried to explain the presence of those people walking around the pyramid, arguing that it was "crazy" . Among these mothers-grandmothers was Alicia Zubasnabar de De la Cuadra, "Licha", who had begun participate in the rounds in September 1977, together with her husband and Hebe de Bonafini.

By that time Maria Isabel Chorobik de Mariani had started looking for other mothers of missing persons who, like her, were also looking for their grandchildren. Mariani had been driven to join with other grandmothers by Lidia Pegenaute, a lawyer who worked as an adviser to minors in the courts of La Plata, where she tried unsuccessfully to find a solution for her case. Dr. Peganaute, was one of the exceptional cases of officials of the judicial branch, who genuinely collaborated with the relatives of disappeared persons. In the second semester of 1977 Mariani went to look for De la Cuadra at her home in La Plata:

The day I met Alicia, she was wearing a pink bedding and she was ordering her house. We started chatting and we lost track of time. That day I began to discover what was really happening and to understand that the search had to be done in another way, that there was not a single missing child but at least two. And if there were two, how many more could they be? For the first time I had the horrible feeling that we did not find the children because they did not want to give them to us.

That day, María Isabel Mariani and Alicia de De la Cuadra made the decision to group together as grandmothers and she summoned those she knew from the Thursday rounds in Plaza de Mayo.

Licha (Alicia de De la Cuadra) looked for the other grandmothers she already knew from the Plaza de Mayo, we met and decided to start working together. We were 12 at that time. It amazed me to see them with such serenity; I was a wink, a continuous cry, I saw them so serene and said 'I have to be like them'. First we became known as «Argentine Grandmothers with Missing Little Children». But we were growing, people began to know us and to call us the "Grandmothers of Plaza de Mayo". (Chicha Mariani)

The twelve founding mother-grandmothers were: María Isabel Chorobik de Mariani, Beatriz HC Aicardi de Neuhaus, Eva Márquez de Castillo Barrios, Alicia Zubasnabar de De la Cuadra, Vilma Delinda Sesarego de Gutiérrez, Mirta Acuña de Baravalle, Haydee Vallino de Lemos, Leontina Puebla de Pérez, Delia Giovanola from Califano, Raquel Radio from Marizcurrena, Clara Jurado and María Eugenia Casinelli from García Irureta Goyena.5 Licha Zubasnabar was its first president. Initially they adopted the name of Abuelas Argentinas with Nietitos Desaparecidos but in 1980 they ended up organizing themselves legally with the denomination for which they were already publicly recognized, Grandmothers of Plaza de Mayo.

This subgroup of Las Madres understood that the situation of the children kidnapped by the security forces was different from that of their parents and that specific strategies and methodologies were needed to recover them. "Finding their grandchildren without forgetting their children", was the slogan that grouped them.

During the military dictatorship and despite the risks, the Grandmothers of Plaza de Mayo began a detective task to locate their grandchildren, without abandoning the search for their children, while they undertook an action of national and international awareness about children disappeared and the theft of babies.

Once democracy was restored on 10 December 1983, the Grandmothers promoted the use of the latest genetic advances to establish a system for identifying the appropriate grandchildren, without precedents in the world, and pressured the State to prosecute those responsible for the kidnappings. of children, considering it as part of a repressive plan.

== Sources ==
Nosiglia, Julio E. (1985). "Chapter 1". War booty Buenos Aires: Cooperativa Tierra Fértil.
