= Aicardi =

Aicardi is a surname. Notable people with the surname include:

- Giovanni Battista Visconti Aicardi (1644–1713), Roman Catholic Bishop of Novara
- Cristina Aicardi (born 1986), Peruvian badminton player
- Giorgio Matteo Aicardi (1891–1984), Italian painter and illustrator
- Jean Aicardi (1926–2015), French neurologist
- Jérémy Aicardi (born 1988), French rugby sevens player
- Matteo Aicardi (born 1986), Italian water polo player
- Beatriz H. C. Aicardi de Neuhaus, Argentine human rights activist, co-founder of the Grandmothers Association of Plaza de Mayo
