= Augusto Conte Mac Donell =

Argentinian lawyer and politician (b. 1927, d. 1992)

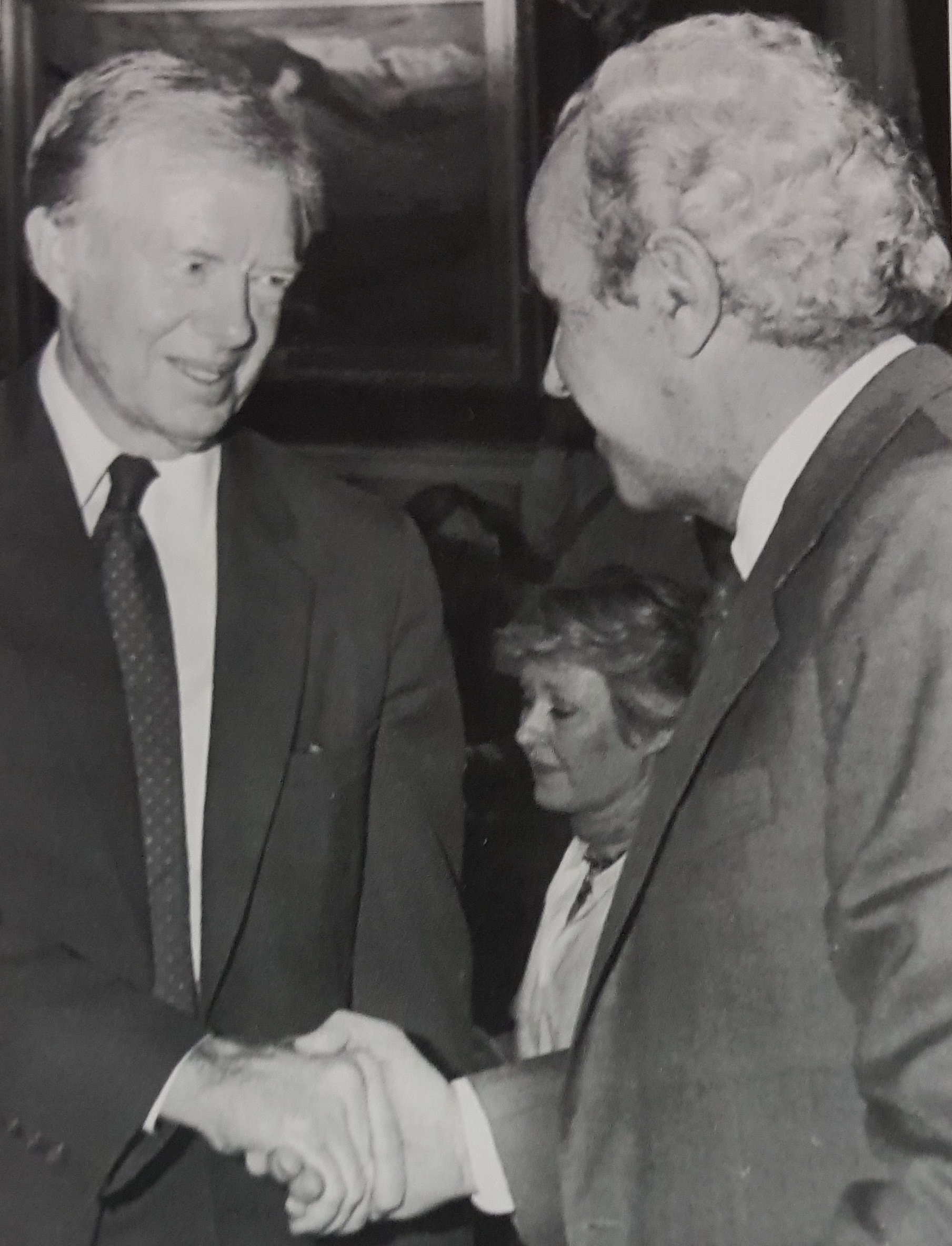
- Conte Mac Donell (right) with U.S. president Jimmy Carter in 1984

National Deputy
- In office 10 December 1983 – 21 April 1987
- Constituency: Federal Capital

Personal details
- Born: 4 May 1926 Buenos Aires, Argentina
- Died: 4 February 1992 (aged 65) Buenos Aires, Argentina
- Cause of death: Suicide
- Party: Christian Democratic Party
- Education: University of Buenos Aires

Augusto Conte Mac Donell (4 May 1926 – 5 February 1992) was an Argentine lawyer, human rights activist and politician. He was a leader of the Christian Democratic Party, and co-founded and led the Center for Legal and Social Studies (CELS). He was a defender of human rights.

== Career ==
In 1955, he was appointed Undersecretary of Defense by the dictatorial régime that took power following the September 1955 coup d'état, which ousted Juan Perón.

On 7 July 1976, during the dictatorship of the National Reorganization Process, his son Augusto María Conte Mac Donell disappeared while he was in military service. Conte Mac Donell's years-long and ultimately unsuccessful search for his son led him becoming a human rights defender.

In 1963, Conte Mac Donell was elected vice president of the Christian Democratic Party.

He wrote many articles, perhaps most importantly one in which he developed the theory of global parallelism, which he cowrote with Emilio Mignone, and presented at the Colloquium of Paris.

Following the return of democracy in 1983, he was elected to the National Chamber of Deputies as a representative of Buenos Aires on the Christian Democratic Party list. He became the only member of the party to be elected to Congress in that election. In 1987, shortly before his term expired, he resigned from his seat and was succeeded by Ángel Atilio J. Bruno.

He died by suicide on 5 February 1992.

== Recognition ==
The Office of the United Nations High Commissioner for Human Rights held a ceremony to commemorate the events that took place at the former ESMA, with Horacio Verbitsky (journalist and president of CELS); Estela de Carlotto (president of the Grandmothers of the Plaza de Mayo), Marta Vázquez (member of Mothers Línea Fundadora), Graciela Lois (supporter of Relatives of Disappeared and Detained for Political Reasons), and Aldo Etchegoyen (co-president of the Permanent Assembly for Human Rights).
