= Pozo de Banfield =

Former Buenos Aires police station and detention center

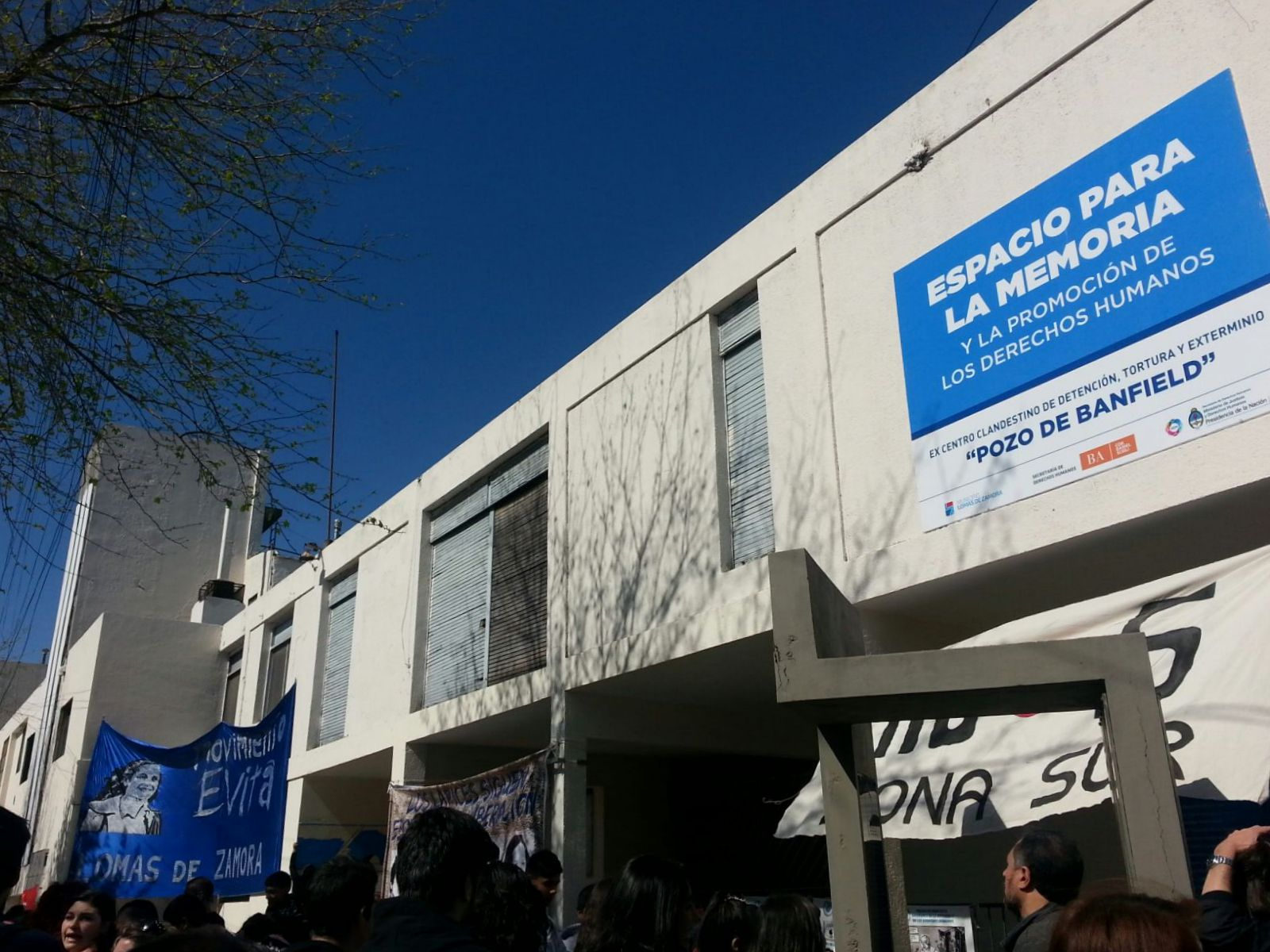
Demonstration in the Pozo of Banfield on the 39th anniversary of the Night of the Pencils.

The Pozo de Banfield is a former Buenos Aires Provincial Police station that was used as an Argentine clandestine detention center from November 1974 to October 1978, during the military dictatorship that ruled the country from 1976 to 1983. This detention center was an integral part of what came to be known as the Circuito Camps, and was one of the first to operate as such during the constitutional government of Isabel Perón, nearly 18 months before the 1976 coup d'état. With the nationwide extension of the 1975 annihilation decrees, provincial police forces were placed under the command of the Army, and subsequently the Banfield Investigations Brigade became subordinated to the 3rd Mechanized Infantry Regiment of the Argentine Army.

== Location and architecture ==
The three-storey building is on the corner of Siciliano and Vernet streets in Villa Centenario in the city of Banfield, Greater Buenos Aires. The commander's office, a torture room, and other facilities were located on the ground floor. On the first floor there were detention cells, offices, the staff dining room, canteen, kitchens, and restrooms, while on the second floor there were more detention cells and another restroom.

== Historical significance ==
A total of 309 Argentines, Uruguayans, Paraguayans and Chileans were detained in the center. Ninety-seven detainees had been kidnapped in forced disappearances; five were set free and subsequently killed. Among the prisoners were four pregnant women (resp. at least eight, according to other sources) who gave birth while detained. Many of the children remain unidentified, although identifications were reported sometimes decades later, largely due to the efforts of the human-rights organization Grandmothers of the Plaza de Mayo which has been instrumental to establish the Argentine Forensic Anthropology Team and the National Bank of Genetic Data with the goal to find victims by genetic testing. Only in 2023, for example, Daniel Enrique González found out that he was born in 1977 in Pozo de Banfield as Daniel Santucho, son Cristina Navajas and Juli Santucho, the latter the brother of the revolutionary Mario Roberto Santucho. Housing women during the last months of pregnancy and separating newborns from their mothers is considered to be one of the main functions of Pozo de Banfield.

Most of the students abducted during the Night of the Pencils in September 1976 were detained for three months in the building.

The building had been the headquarters of the Banfield Investigations Brigade since the 1960s, and continued in this capacity throughout its use as a clandestine detention center. In 2006, long after the end of the dictatorship, it was handed over to the Secretariat of Human Rights at the request of social organisations, to be used as a memory site (sitio de memoria).

== See also ==
- Dirty War
- Clandestine detention center (Argentina)
- Forced disappearance#Argentina
- National Reorganization Process
- Navy Petty-Officers School
