= Miguel Etchecolatz =

Argentine convicted murderer (1929–2022)

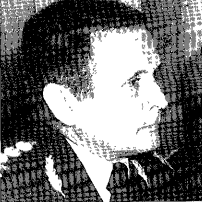
- Etchecolatz, c. 1978
- Born: 1 May 1929; Argentina
- Died: 2 July 2022 (aged 93); Buenos Aires, Argentina
- Occupation: Senior Argentine police officer
- Status: Deceased
- Criminal charges: Homicide, torture, kidnapping
- Penalty: Life imprisonment

Miguel Osvaldo Etchecolatz (1 May 1929 – 2 July 2022) was an Argentine police officer, who worked in the Buenos Aires Provincial Police during the first years of the military dictatorship of the 1970s, known as the National Reorganization Process (El proceso), which Etchecolatz was deeply involved in. He was first convicted of crimes committed during this period in 1986; the full stop law, which passed that year and created amnesty for security officers, meant that he was released without a sentence. In 2003, Congress repealed the law and the government re-opened prosecution of crimes committed during the Dirty War.

In 2004, Etchecolatz was one of the first two officials convicted and sentenced for child abduction: taking a child from "disappeared" parents, passing it on for adoption by officials of the regime, and hiding the child's true identity. He and Jorge Berges were each sentenced to seven years. He was also deemed responsible of the "Night of the Pencils", where 10 high-school students were abducted by security forces in the city of La Plata near Buenos Aires in September 1976. Six of the 10 were "forcibly disappeared", with their fate remaining unknown. The four survivors said they were tortured.

For his actions in the Provincial Police during El proceso, in 2006 he was tried, convicted and sentenced to life imprisonment, on numerous charges of homicide, illegal deprivation of freedom (kidnapping), and torture. The tribunal in passing the sentence said that Etchecolatz's crimes were "crimes against humanity in the context of the genocide that took place in Argentina". This was the first time that the term "genocide" had been used to characterize the crimes committed against political prisoners during the Dirty War.

The term "Dirty War" refers to the widespread state terrorism and atrocities committed under the military dictatorship of Argentina during 1976 to 1983. A military junta was established, led by General Jorge Rafael Videla, after a coup d'état against President Isabel Perón. During the military rule, tens of thousands of political dissidents were killed or "forcibly disappeared".

== During the dictatorship ==
Etchecolatz served as Commissioner General of Police, directly reporting to Police Chief Ramón Camps. He served as Director of Investigations of the Buenos Aires provincial police from March 1976 until late 1977. During his period in office, Buenos Aires Province had the highest number of illegal detentions in the country. Etchecolatz was second in command during the "Night of the Pencils", when several high school students were detained and tortured, and some murdered.

== Return to democracy ==
In 1983, democratic rule was restored in Argentina. The Trial of Juntas began in 1985, and numerous top figures were prosecuted, including General Ramón Camps, who was convicted and sentenced to life. In a 1986 trial, Etchecolatz was convicted and sentenced to 23 years for several counts of illegal detention and forced disappearances. He was spared a prison sentence because that year Congress passed the "Full Stop Law" (Ley de Punto Final) and the "Law of Due Obedience", which halted prosecution of officers for crimes committed during the Dirty War.

After his release, Etchecolatz wrote a book defending his actions, called La otra campaña del Nunca Más (The Other Never Again Campaign). The title referred to Nunca Más (Never Again), the report produced by the National Commission on the Disappearance of Persons, which had heard testimony about the disappeared and survivors of state terror. Jorge and Marcelo Gristelli, owners of a Catholic publishing house, released the book in 1998 at the Buenos Aires International Book Fair.

In his book, Etchecolatz stated: "I never had, or thought to have, or was haunted by, any sense of blame. For having killed? I was the executor of a law made by man. I was the keeper of divine precepts. And I would do it again." In 2001, the Gristellis were seen shielding Etchecolatz as he left court in Buenos Aires; they reportedly used violence against left-wing demonstrators who allegedly confronted and insulted the former police officer.

Etchecolatz also faced civil trials, which were outside the purview of the Pardon Laws (these had covered acts that were committed in the context of military or police procedure). In 2004, both he and Jorge Berges were convicted and sentenced to seven years in prison for the abduction of a "disappeared" couple's child, handing it on for illegal adoption, and the suppression of the child's true identity. They were the first officials convicted for "baby snatching", but estimates are that 400 children were taken from political prisoners. Seventy-seven have had their identities restored to them.

He was imprisoned in Villa Devoto in 2004 and 2005. He was later allowed to continue the sentence under house arrest due to his advanced age (over 70 years old at the time). Although Etchecolatz's lawyers claimed he had a terminal illness, after police found a firearm in his home in 2006 in violation of the terms of house arrest, he was transferred to the Marcos Paz prison.

== The 2006 trial ==
In 2003, Congress repealed the 1986 "Pardon Laws" (Ley de Punto Final), and re-opened investigation and prosecution of crimes committed during the Dirty War. Human rights activists said that potentially hundreds of people could be brought to trial. Etchecolatz was the first official of that era to be prosecuted.

Beginning in June 2006, he was tried for human rights abuses, in a case that drew international attention. On 19 September 2006, he was found guilty of the detention and torture of Jorge López and Nilda Eloy, and the homicides of Ambrosio Francisco De Marco, Patricia Graciela Dell'Orto, Diana Teruggi de Mariani, Elena Arce Sahores, Nora Livia Formiga and Margarita Delgado.

In passing sentence, the tribunal said that Etchecolatz's crimes were "crimes against humanity in the context of the genocide that took place in Argentina". It was the first time that the term genocide was used in Argentine trials to characterize the crimes committed against political prisoners, and the court explained its reasoning.(See footnote quote in Lead)

Together with Police Chief Ramón Camps, Etchecolatz is believed to have operated at least eight clandestine detention centres in La Plata, Quilmes, Banfield, and Martínez. More than 100 witnesses were called, including former president Raúl Alfonsín (1983–1989), under whose administration the Pardon Laws were passed in 1986.

Etchecolatz criticized the procedures of the trial as biased and the judges as obedient to other powers. He said he was "an old man who is ill, with no money and no power", and "a part of a war that we [won] with the arms and that we're losing politically." He refused to acknowledge the authority of the judges, telling them "You are not the judge. The supreme judge awaits us after death. [...] It's not this tribunal that sentences me, it's you." The last thing he said before hearing the sentence was to claim he was "a prisoner of war" and "a political prisoner".

=== Political intimidation ===
==== Disappearance of Jorge Julio López ====
Before Etchecolatz was sentenced, Jorge Julio López, who was among those illegally detained and who testified in the trial, was reported as missing and feared "disappeared". He was seen for the last time on 17 September 2006. The provincial government offered a 200,000 peso (US$64,000) reward for information on his whereabouts. López, a 77-year-old retired mason with Parkinson's disease, was initially thought to have suffered post-traumatic stress disorder after re-living his ordeal during the trial, or chosen to hide after being threatened. But, after a few days, the theory that he had been kidnapped gained support among the authorities.

Buenos Aires Governor Felipe Solá stated that López "could be the first desaparecido since the years of state terrorism", and that this could be intended "to intimidate future witnesses or block their participation in other trials". President Néstor Kirchner warned, "The past is not defeated... [But] we cannot go back to that past". Human and civil rights organizations allege that active and retired provincial police personnel took part in the kidnapping of López, to intimidate other witnesses and impede future trials.

On 6 October 2006, a demonstration of tens of thousands at the Plaza de Mayo, demanded López be found.

Suspicions about the cause of López's disappearance were strengthened in 2014, when Etchecolatz and 14 others were convicted in a trial addressing crimes committed at the 'La Cacha' clandestine detention centre, the place where, among others, Laura Carlotto, the daughter of the head of the Grandmothers of the Plaza de Mayo, Estela de Carlotto, was held. As the judge handed down sentences, Etchecolatz took a piece of paper and wrote on it: "Jorge Julio López." The moment was captured by photographers and when the images were inspected, the other side of the piece of paper could also be read. It said the missing person's name, again, along with the addition of one other word: "Kidnap."

==== Threats to judges ====
On 27 September 2006, judge Carlos Rozanski, president of the court that sentenced Etchecolatz, confirmed he received a long letter that claimed judges were being pressured by the national government and denounced those who "from the offices of power do not look for justice but for revenge against those who defended the Nation." The letter was signed by the self-styled Third International Congress of Victims of Terrorism – Barcelona – Spain. The official Third International Congress of Terror Victims, denied any involvement. Three trial judges also received threatening telephone calls.

The same letter was received by Santa Fe federal judge Reinaldo Rodríguez and by several federal prosecutors. The text was "well-written" and correctly addressed, and contained covert threats, pointing out that the senders "are bound, as citizens, to monitor that [judicial officials] fulfill their functions", and that "this farce will end soon, and those who have not honored their posts will be accountable to a particularly impartial court".

== See also ==
- Rodolfo Almirón
- Ramón Camps
- Leopoldo Galtieri
- History of Argentina
- Mothers of the Plaza de Mayo
- National Commission on the Disappearance of Persons
- Night of the Pencils
- Operation Condor
- José López Rega
- State terrorism
