= Night of the Pencils =

1976 kidnappings and forced disappearances in Argentina

- Part of the Dirty War
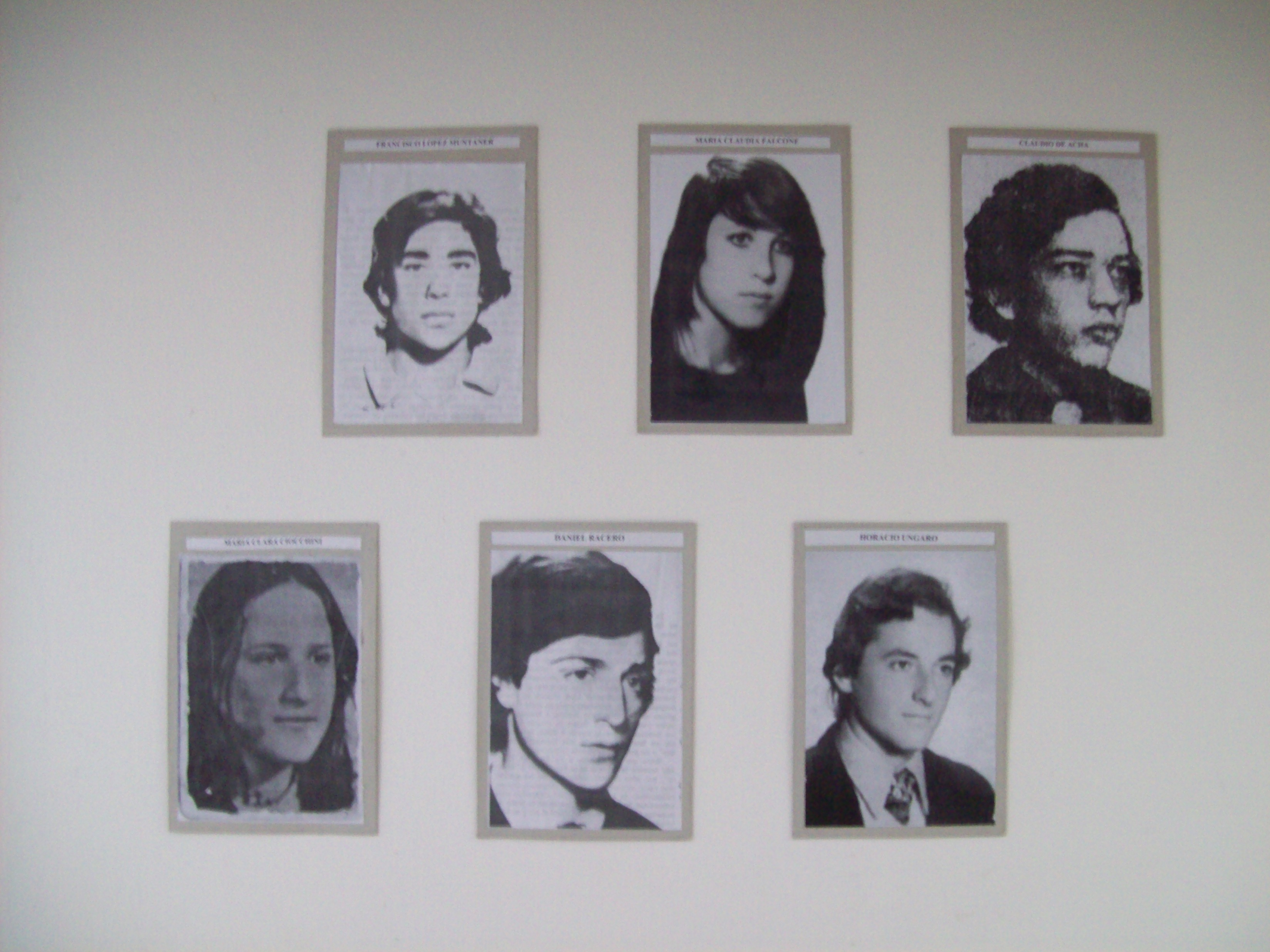
- Image of the six students who remain missing after being kidnapped
- Location: Argentina
- Date: 16–21 September 1976
- Target: Students
- Attack type: Kidnappings, forced disappearances, torture, rape, murder
- Victims: 4 survivors 6 missing
- Perpetrator: National Reorganization Process
- Assailant: Miguel Etchecolatz

The Night of the Pencils (in Spanish: Noche de los Lápices), was a series of kidnappings and forced disappearances, followed by the torture, rape, and murder of 10 high-school students that began on the evening of 16 September 1976 and continued into the next day, during Argentina's last civil-military dictatorship. The event is one of the most infamous acts of repression committed by the last Argentine military dictatorship, as most of the victims were under 18 years of age. Four of the victims survived; the remains of the others have never been found.

== Context ==
The Argentine military seized power following a March 1976 coup d'état. The military junta then implemented what was they called a "National Reorganization Process" which was a set of policies used by the regime to destroy left-wing guerrilla forces and oppress resistance to its rule. The process included kidnappings, torture and murder. Meanwhile, the leftist guerilla group Montoneros responded violently to the junta and its actions as they enlisted other Argentines to join their campaign against the regime.

The Night of the Pencils victims were largely from the Unión de Estudiantes Secundarios (UES, Spanish for Union of High School Students) of La Plata. UES was committed to achieving school reforms and other political objectives, including the 1975 protests in which more than 3,000 students marched to protest recent price hikes in the bus fare and demanding the restoration of a subsidised bus ticket for secondary school students. As with many left-wing activists in Argentina, they were persecuted and targeted by the Police.

The UES was a front organisation for the Montoneros, although the extent to which the UES was actively connected to the ERP and the Montoneros is disputed. One of the survivors, Pablo Diaz, had left the UES for the Guevarist Youth in 1975.

Jorge Falcone, the brother of one of the kidnapped students, María Claudia Falcone, has maintained that her activities against the military dictatorship went beyond student protests, and that on the day she was kidnapped she was hiding weapons in her aunt's residence and was prepared to use them. He wrote his sister was not a victim, or a martyr, but a hero of the organization Montoneros.

He also defended his sister's commitment to the Montoneros guerrilla movement in Argentina:

My sister wasn't Little Red Riding Hood whom the wolf gulped down. She was a revolutionary militant... The militant was the type [of person] who, in a moment, could send a molotov flying in a lightning act... They could also carry out support action in a major military operation.

On the whole, the victims were like thousands of other teens at the time who had become politically active after the fall of the Lanusse dictatorship.

At a 2006 event to mark the 30th anniversary, Emilce Molder, who was held and tortured for 2 years said that:

"The problem was that we were militant and that's what I associate our detention with. [...] The [student bus] ticket had been a clear motive to organize ourselves around, but it happened in '75. It was quite before our arrests. [...] I was 17 years old and I couldn't defend myself against those charges [criminal conspiracy, possession of weapons and explosives]. They closed the door on me and then yes, I imagined the worst.

Regardless, as a group of young, left-wing, politically active students, the UES were suspected of having supplied fighters to the ERP. Colonel Ramón Camps, head of the Buenos Aires Provincial Police, and Director of Investigations Miguel Etchecolatz were tasked with eliminating the UES.

== Kidnappings ==
On 16 and 17 September 1976, masked men raided homes under cover of darkness, taking students away to clandestine detention centres in what became known as the "Night of the Pencils". It concluded five days later when Camps' henchmen kidnapped student Pablo Díaz. He was taken to a detention center in Arana, joining his fellow high school activists, where they were brutally tortured. At some point in late September, a large group of detainees which included the students was herded into two police vans. The convoy stopped at the Investigations Brigade of Banfield headquarters (AKA Pozo de Banfield or Banfield's Pit), where a number of people were forced to get out. Díaz was among them.

Details of the Night of the Pencils were provided by the two survivors from that 16–21 September period. Emilce Moler said: "They tortured us with profound sadism. I remember being naked. I was just a fragile small girl of about 1.5 m and weighed about 47 kg, and I was beaten senseless by what I judged was a huge man" and "after about a week at our first detention centre, we were all taken to another place in a truck. At some point we stopped and some of my friends were taken out. Those are the ones that disappeared." Moler said that she did not know why some UES members were allowed to live and others killed. Like most of the others, Emilce belonged to the students' union. The military regarded them as subversives.

Pablo Díaz testified: "In Arana, they gave me electric shocks in my mouth, my gums, and my genitals. They tore out one of my toenails. It was very usual to spend several days without food."

On 28 December 1976, an Army Major told Díaz he would become a legal prisoner and was transferred to the Pozo de Quilmes, where he joined Moler, Calotti and Miranda. Those who were still being held at Banfield are presumed to have been taken out and executed by firing squad on the first week of January 1977.

The kidnapped students were:

Name	Age in 1976	Date of Disappearance	Current Status	Additional Details
María Claudia Falcone	16	16 September 1976	Missing	The daughter of a former Peronist mayor of La Plata, Falcone joined the UES soon after attending the Fine Arts School. Following 1973, she became involved in schools and health departments in poor neighborhoods of La Plata. In 1975, Falcone actively participated in the campaign for the Secondary School Bus Ticket (Boleto Escolar Secundario-- BES). She was kidnapped from her grandmother's house along with her friend María Clara Ciocchini. According to her brother Jorge Falcone, she was a Montoneros militant.
Claudio de Acha	17	16 September 1976	Missing	After Héctor Cámpora's victory in 1973, Acha participated in the takeover of the Colegio Nacional de la Plata for its democratization. After Juan Perón's death, he joined the UES. He participated in protests for the BES. Acha was kidnapped while at the house of Horacio Ungaro.
Gustavo Calotti "Francés"	18	8 September 1976	Survivor	Calotti was a graduate from the Colegio Nacional. By the time he was kidnapped, Calotti had become a police cadet. He had fought in the UES, but in 1976 he had left and become more involved in left-wing groups. Although his kidnapping took place on 8 September, he is considered a survivor of the "Night of the Pencils" due to his association with the other students.
María Clara Ciocchini	18	16 September 1976	Missing	A Catholic school student, Ciocchini participated in the scouting and the UES parish of Bahia Blanca. Because of the crimes of the Triple A (Argentine Anticommunist Alliance) and the CNU (Concentracion Nacional Universitaria) in that city, Ciocchini moved to La Plata at the end of 1975, where she enrolled in Bellas Artes. She lived in the home of María Claudia Falcone. Ciocchini and Falcone were kidnapped together.
Pablo Díaz	18	21 September 1976	Survivor	As the son of a right-wing Peronist university professor, Díaz was expelled from a Catholic school and ended up in "La Legión" (The Legion). He had been a member of the UES, but in 1976 Díaz was active in the ERP-backed Guevarist Youth. 369 members would later be abducted when it was discovered that this group was planning acts of armed resistance against the military dictatorship for the 1978 World Cup held in Argentina. He was abducted on 21 September 1976. In 1985 he made his experiences public while testifying in court.
Francisco López Muntaner "Panchito"	16	16 September 1976	Missing	The son of a Peronist oil worker, Panchito was a member of the UES in the Fine Arts School. Along with Claudia Falcone, he participated in volunteer work in poor neighborhoods and in the struggle for the BES in 1975.
Patricia Miranda	17	17 September 1976	Survivor	Did not belong to any political or militant organization. Held until March 1978.
Emilce Moler	17	17 September 1976	Survivor	Daughter of a retired inspector commissioner and UES militant in Bellas Artes.
Daniel A. Racero	18	16 September 1976	Missing	Son of a Peronist naval officer who died in 1973, Racero worked as a messenger even as a child. When he joined the UES of Normal Nº 3 de La Plata, Racero wrote: "I found a trench to fight for a just cause." He administered vaccinations, fixed housing and worked for schools in poor neighborhoods and participated in the conquest of the BES. Racero was kidnapped in the house of Horacio Ungaro.
Horacio Ungaro	17	16 September 1976	Missing	Born to a Communist family, in 1974 Ungaro broke the family tradition and joined the UES of Normal Nº 3. He participated in the struggle of the Coordinator for the BES. Ungaro worked at slum schools located behind the La Plata racetrack. He was kidnapped on 16 September 1976.

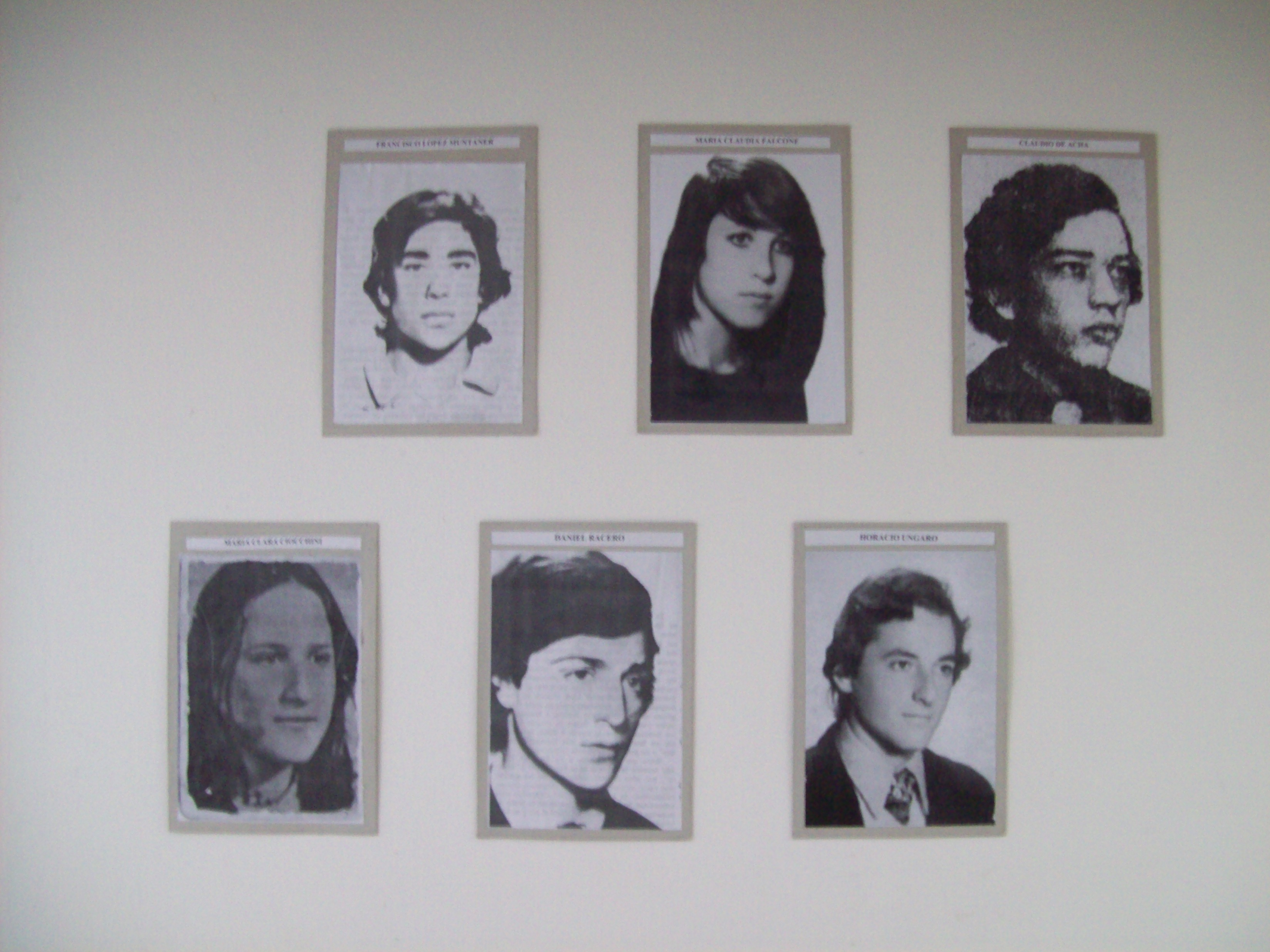
Hall of Memory at the UTN Avellaneda, recoding the six students who remain missing after being kidnapped on The Night of the Pencils: Claudio de Acha, María Clara Ciocchini, María Claudia Falcone, Francisco López Muntaner, Daniel A. Racero and Horacio Ungaro.

== Aftermath ==
In September 2011 nearly two dozen junta officials were charged with crimes against humanity for their roles in the Night of the Pencils. Among them was Miguel Etchecolatz, already serving a life sentence for other crimes committed as an officer in the regime.

Today the victims of the Night of the Pencils are remembered, along with thousands of other victims of the dictatorship, on March 24, the Argentine Day of Remembrance for Truth and Justice. Night of the Pencils is also now seen as the opening salvo in Argentina's Dirty War. In Bahía Blanca, the Plaza de los Lápices honors the victims of the event.

== In popular culture ==
- The saga of the students' ordeal was depicted in Hector Olivera's 1986 film Night of the Pencils.
- The testimony of Pablo Díaz, the last survivor to be released, served as the basis for the song "Noche de los lápices" by Canarian singer Rogelio Botanz.

== See also ==
- National Commission on the Disappearance of Persons
- Disappeared Detainees of the Dirty War
- Ramón Camps
- Miguel Etchecolatz
- Christian von Wernich
- Montoneros
- National Reorganization Process
- Dirty War

== Bibliography ==
- Seoane, María y Hector Ruiz Nuñez: La Noche de los Lápices. Buenos Aires: Sudamericana, 2003. ISBN 950-07-2352-2 Registro en Cámara Argentina del Libro] (in Spanish)
- Comisión Nacional sobre la Desaparición de Personas (CONADEP): Nunca más. Buenos Aires: Eudeba, 1984. (in Spanish)
