= Alicia Zubasnabar de De la Cuadra =

Argentine human rights activist (1915–2008)

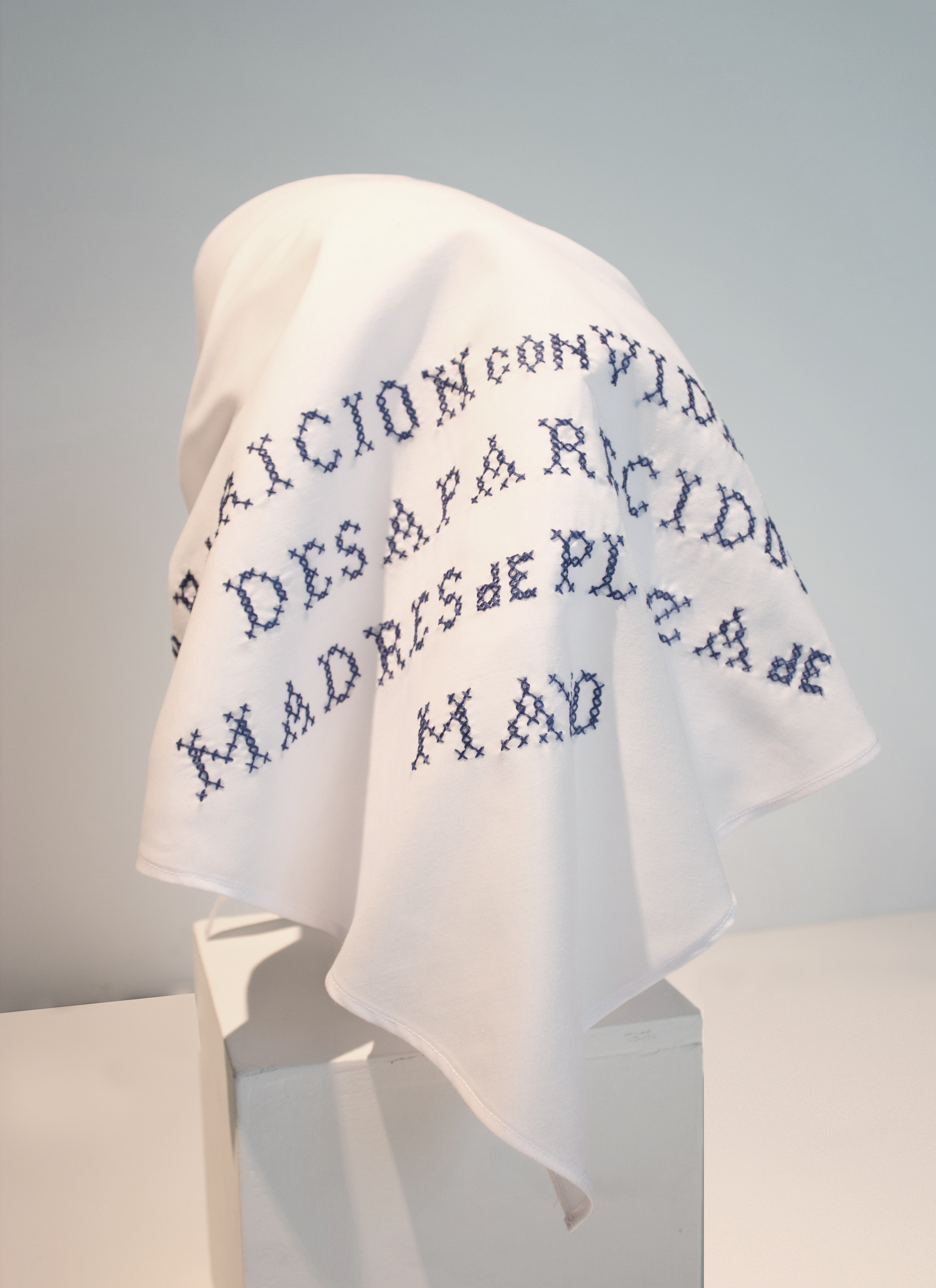
- Born: Alicia Zubasnabar; 15 July 1915; Sauce, Corrientes, Argentina
- Died: 1 June 2008 (aged 92)
- Occupation: Activist
- Spouse: Roberto Luis De la Cuadra
- Children: 2

Alicia "Licha" Zubasnabar de De la Cuadra (born Alicia Zubasnubar; 15 July 1915 – 1 June 2008), was an Argentine human rights activist. She was one of the twelve founding members of the Grandmothers of the Plaza de Mayo and served as the first president of the organization. She has been named as a "prominent woman" by the Argentine National Congress and as an "illustrious citizen" by Corrientes Province.

== Biography ==
Alicia Zubasnabar de De la Cuadra was born in the small town of Sauce, Corrientes Province, in 1915. While living there she married Roberto Luis De la Cuadra and had five children with him. In 1945 they moved to settle in La Plata city, capital of Buenos Aires Province.

During the military dictatorship named by its leaders as the National Reorganisation Process (1976-1983) her husband, a worker at the Propulsora Siderúrgica (Iron and Steel Propellent) in Ensenada, her son Roberto José and her daughter Elena, who was pregnant, and her sons-in-law Héctor Baratti and Gustavo Ernesto Fraire were abducted, along with her grandson who was later recovered. It would later be discovered that her granddaughter was born in captivity on June 16, 1977, named Ana Libertad by her mother. Except for her grandson, none of them were ever seen again.

Monseñor Emilio Graselli, private secretary to the army chaplain Mons. Adolfo S. Tortolo, who had a register listing many abducted individuals and particularly with information on the fates of children born in captivity, told her that her son had died and that her daughter was being held under arrest.

A year later, Alicia received news of the birth of her granddaughter and of the deplorable conditions under which her daughter and son-in-law were suffering:

On that day (11 July 1977) a young man came to my house and said that he had been in the Quinta police station, La Plata, in the same room as Elena's husband. He didn't tell me anything about my son. But he told me that Elena had had a baby girl, who she named Ana, who weighed 3k 750g and whose footprints were recorded. He told me that Elena shared her cell with five other girls - in an absolute and total lack of hygiene - and who gave birth without medical assistance and while lying on the floor while her cellmates shouted in horror, asking for help. He told me that Elena's husband, along with 35 other men, were at that moment in the next cell, in handcuffs and blindfolded, being periodically tortured. In the end, very hurt, he confessed to me that four days after being born Ana was separated from her mother and that Hector had sent a sort of last message: "Look for our daughter".

The judges systematically refused to start any sort of investigative activities. Shortly afterwards, thanks to the negotiations of that Italian Jesuit order, Monseñor Mario Pichi intervened, meeting with Colonel Enrique Rospide to ask him if he could give the child to its grandmother. The Colonel replied:

What you are asking me for is impossible, monseñor. The girl - and this is an irreversible fact - has already been given to a very important family.

== Grandmothers of the Plaza de Mayo ==
The coup d'état of March 24, 1976, established a regime of state terrorism based on the forced disappearance of the opposition and the imposition of an atmosphere of terror designed to avoid complaints. At that time, the family members of the disappeared were completely defenceless and powerless, as neither any of the world's democracies, nor the Catholic Church, nor international humanitarian organisations were ready to condemn the atrocities committed by the military regime and on the contrary even cooperated with this illegal repression in some cases. Nor was it possible to call on the judiciary system for help.

Under these conditions a group of mothers, fathers and other family members of the disappeared started a nonviolent resistance movement which made history. The idea was put forward by Azucena Villaflor, later kidnapped and murdered by the dictatorship:

We have to go straight to the Plaza de Mayo and stay there until they answer us.

On April 30, 1977, they began marching every Thursday around the Pirámide de Mayo in the square of the same name, located opposite the House of Government. To call attention to themselves, the women decided to cover their heads with white cloth. The group quickly became known as the Mothers of the Plaza de Mayo, and by their simple presence they began to exert national and international pressure on the question of the fates of those who disappeared in Argentina. Amongst these mothers and grandmothers was Alicia Zubasnabar de De la Cuadra, "Licha", who had started to participate in the marches in September 1977 along with her husband and Hebe de Bonafini.

At that time, another mother and grandmother, María Isabel Chorobik de Mariani or "Chicha", had started looking for other mothers of the disappeared who were, like her, looking for their grandchildren. Mariani had been pushed towards joining up with other grandmothers by Lidia Pegenaute, a lawyer working as an advisor to minors in the courts of La Plata, where she had tried without success to find a solution to her case. In the second half of 1977 Mariani went to see De la Cuadra at her house in La Plata:

On the day I met Alicia she was wearing a pink dressing-gown and tidying her house. We started talking and lost track of time. On that day I started to find out what was really happening and to understand that the search had to happen in a different way, that there was not just a single missing child but at least two of them. And if there were two, how many more could there be? For the first time I felt the horrific feeling that we couldn't find the children because they didn't want to give them to us.

That same day, Chicha and Licha made the decision to form a group of grandmothers and unite those whom they knew from the Thursday marches in the Plaza de Mayo.

Licha (Alicia de De la Cuadra) looked for the other grandmothers that she already knew from the Plaza de Mayo, we met up and we decided to work together. There were 12 of us at that time. It astonished me to see them so calm; I was a wreck, constantly crying, I saw them all looking so calm and I said "I have to be like them". First of all we were known as the "Argentinian Grandmothers with Disappeared Grandchildren". But as we grew, people came to know us and to call us the "Grandmothers of the Plaza de Mayo". (Chicha Mariani)

The twelve founding mothers and grandmothers were María Isabel Chorobik de Mariani, Beatriz H. C. Aicardi de Neuhaus, Eva Márquez de Castillo Barrios, Alicia Zubasnabar de De la Cuadra, Vilma Delinda Sesarego de Gutiérrez, Mirta Acuña de Baravalle, Haydee Vallino de Lemos, Leontina Puebla de Pérez, Delia Giovanola de Califano, Raquel Radio de Marizcurrena, Clara Jurado y María Eugenia Casinelli de García Irureta Goyena. Licha Zubasnabar was the group's first president. They were initially known as the "Argentinian Grandmothers with Disappeared Grandchildren", but in 1980 they became legally organised under their publicly recognised name, "Grandmothers of the Plaza de Mayo".

The subgroup of "The Mothers" understood that the situation of the children kidnapped by security forces was different from that of their parents, and that specific strategies and methods were needed for their recovery. "Search for our grandchildren without forgetting our children" was the motto which united them.

During the military dictatorship and despite the risks, the Grandmothers of the Plaza de Mayo began investigations in order to find their grandchildren, without abandoning the search for their children, at the same time as starting a national and international public awareness campaign focusing on their missing grandchildren and the dictatorship's systematic kidnapping of children.

Once democracy was restored on December 10, 1983, the grandmothers promoted the use of the most recent genetic advances to establish a system for identifying their stolen grandchildren, a system unprecedented in the world, and pressured the state into indicting those responsible for the kidnapping of children, considering them to be part of a plan of repression.

In 1984, the Grandmothers became a civil non-profit association, with Alicia stepping down as president and the role passing on to María Isabel de Mariani (Chicha). At that time, her husband had just died. From then on, Alicia continued as the group's spokeswoman. By 2008, the Grandmothers of the Plaza de Mayo had recovered 88 grandchildren. It is estimated that, in total, about five hundred children born between 1975 and 1980 were kidnapped.

And despite that, one keeps hoping. We keep hoping. And I think that we'll continue to hope for our entire lives. I have often felt desperate and powerless before this wall of silence and total denial of what happened. But I never, never feel beaten, and I always have this conviction to continue to fight until I find all the grandchildren and my own granddaughter, until they are returned to their true homes, until I can hold her in my arms as her parents wanted. And if I can't have my vanished children, I will keep on fighting for what happened to be uncovered, so that Argentina and the whole world know, with no room for doubt, who the murderers were. (Alicia de De la Cuadra)

== See also ==
- Dirty War
- Operation Condor
- Mothers of the Plaza de Mayo
- Grandmothers of the Plaza de Mayo

== Sources ==
- Bravo, Sebastián. "El Congreso de la Nación distinguió a la primera Abuela de Plaza de Mayo correntina". Diario El Litoral de Corrientes, 29 November 2007.
- Nosiglia, Julio E. (1985). "Capítulo 2". Botín de guerra (PDF). Buenos Aires: Cooperativa Tierra Fértil. Archived from the original (PDF) on 5 September 2008.
- Semana Profesional. "Ciudadana ilustre de Corrientes: la abuela de Plaza de Mayo Alicia Zubasnabar de la Cuadra". Semana Profesional, 5 December 2005. Archived from the original on 14 October 2008.
