= Death of Santiago Pampillón =

Santiago Pampillón (1942–1966) was an Argentine student and activist. He was shot and killed by security forces during a protest in downtown Córdoba in September 1966.

== Life ==
Santiago Pampillón was a second-year engineering student, activist, and part-time employee of Industrias Kaiser Argentina (IKA).

== Student strike ==
On the night of 7 September 1966, thousands of students responded to the call for a strike, including Santiago Pampillón. The police were ordered to prevent and suppress the protest and a battle ensued, spanning more than twenty blocks from downtown. Amid the struggle, Pampillón received three shots to the head, fired at close range by a policeman. He was taken to a hospital, where he died on 12 September.

In solidarity with the student movement, the CGT of Córdoba organized a silent march that was later repressed by the police.

== Implications ==
Santiago Pampillón was the first casualty in a long series of murders that occurred during the course of the military regime (1966-1973), among others such as Juan José Cabral, Adolfo Bello, Luis Norberto White and Silvia Filler. His death anticipated an escalation of violence that eventually led to full-fledged state terrorism in Argentina. Since then, the Argentine student movement has vindicated his name as a symbol of university activism and worker-student unity.

== See also ==
- List of cases of police brutality in Argentina
