= List of cases of police brutality in Argentina =

This is a list of notable cases of police brutality in Argentina.

- 1903–1904: during a long campaign of general strikes organized by the Argentine Regional Workers' Federation, a May Day 1903 clash between workers and police left two dead and 15 injured. At a bakers' strike in Rosario, one worker was shot by police.
- 1909: on May Day, a large workers march through Buenos Aires was broken up by the police, resulting in 12 deaths and a hundred wounded.
- 1919: a series of riots and massacres took place in Buenos Aires in January, when anarchist unions declared a massive strike remembered as Tragic Week.
- 1921: several policemen were killed in the first phase of the Patagonia rebelde, an anarchist strike which was put down by the Army in a bloodless action in May, but in the second phase, starting in November, army forces executed hundreds of rural workers. Local police and the National Gendarmerie assisted the army in the massacre.
- 1932: Federal Police chief Leopoldo Polo Lugones introduced the picana, a torture device adapted from the electric cattle prod, in Buenos Aires.
- 1966: During a protest led by professors and students of the University of Buenos Aires, five university departments were brutally cleared by the Federal Police, in a repressive action known as La Noche de los Bastones Largos ("The Night of the Long Batons").
- 1966: student Santiago Pampillón was shot dead by police during a protest in downtown Córdoba in September.
- 1969: the police killed two students during the riots known as the first Rosariazo, which took place at Rosario in May. The police were overwhelmed during the second Rosariazo in September, and the army moved in, suppressing the protest.
- 1969: shortly after the first Rosariazo there was a general strike in Córdoba, which provoked the police repression and led to a civil uprising later termed the Cordobazo.
- 1991: Walter Bulacio was killed by the federal police's beating after a razzia when he was taken to the police sectional.
- 2001: during the December 2001 riots, there were violent incidents between police and protesters throughout the country, mostly in Buenos Aires and in Santa Fe Province. Five people were killed at Plaza de Mayo.
- 2002: Maximiliano Kosteki (21) and Darío Santillán (22) were killed by Buenos Aires Provincial Police in the context of a mass mobilization repressed by state forces.
- 2009: teenager Luciano Arruga went missing after being intercepted by police. The case has been presented by human rights organisations as an emblematic example of post-dictatorship enforced disappearance.
- 2017: On 8 December, officer Luis Chocobar shot two young criminals escaping from an attempted robbery and stabbing. Chocobar killed 18-year-old Juan Pablo Kukoc and injured the other young man. In May 2021, Chocobar received a 2-year suspended sentence, which was annulled in May 2024, with the Court of Cassation ordering a new trial.
- 2020: Luis Espinoza disappeared and was later found dead. He was killed by Tucumán Provincial Police in the context of the 2020 lockdowns due to the COVID-19 pandemic. He was covered in plastic and rug, his body moved to a police precinct, and then taken in a car trunk to the neighboring province of Catamarca where his body was dropped into a ravine.
