= Christian von Wernich =

Argentine Roman Catholic priest

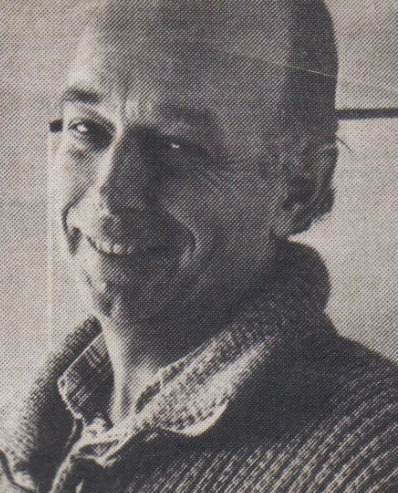
- Wernich in 1984
- Born: Christian Federico von Wernich; 27 May 1938 (age 88); Concordia, Entre Ríos, Argentina
- Occupation: Roman Catholic priest
- Convictions: 7 counts of homicide 41 counts of kidnapping and torture
- Penalty: Life imprisonment

Christian Federico von Wernich (born 27 May 1938 in Concordia, Entre Ríos Province) is an Argentine Roman Catholic priest and a former chaplain of the Buenos Aires Provincial Police while it was under the command of General Ramón Camps, during the dictatorial period known as the National Reorganization Process (1976–1983). Wernich worked in Miguel Etchecolatz's Direction of Investigations of the provincial police with the rank of Inspector. He became internationally known in 2006 after being indicted for murder and kidnapping in aid of the military junta; he was convicted at trial in October 2007 and sentenced to life imprisonment.

== Early life and education ==
Christian Federico von Wernich was born in 1938 into an ethnic German Catholic family. He attended parochial school and seminary, and was ordained as a Catholic priest in 1960.

== Career ==
Wernich became a chaplain of the Buenos Aires Provincial Police in the 1970s, at the time commanded by General Ramón Camps. Wernich served as chaplain during the military dictatorship known as the National Reorganization Process, when the military and security forces took extreme actions to suppress political dissent in Argentina. The period became known as the Dirty War, and the government was later held responsible for tens of thousands of forced disappearances, kidnappings, torture, and deaths of political prisoners, in addition to widespread attacks of rural insurgents, which was later assessed as genocide. Going beyond acting as a spiritual adviser to police and suspects, Wernich worked with the rank of Inspector in Miguel Etchecolatz's Direction of Investigations of the Provincial Police.

Two years after the return of democracy in 1983, the government began to prosecute crimes under the dictatorship, in the so-called Trial of the Juntas in 1985. Wernich was among those accused of participation in the Dirty War, and collaborating in the torture of political prisoners. He declared that he was innocent. Action against those involved in the military dictatorship was discontinued after National Congress passed the so-called Full Stop Law in 1986, intending to "draw a line" over all that had happened until then.

The country struggled to restore democratic institutions and rule of law. In 1991, President Carlos Saúl Menem pardoned Camps and other high-ranking leaders who had been convicted in the 1985 trial, setting off waves of protest. In 2003 the National Congress repealed the 1986 Full Stop Law. (In a court challenge, the Supreme Court of Argentina ruled in 2005 that the law was unconstitutional.)

In 2003 the government re-opened prosecution of cases of crimes against humanity committed during the Dirty War. La Plata Federal Judge Arnaldo Corazza gathered testimony from witnesses who placed Wernich at three illegal detention centers (Puesto Vasco, Coti Martínez and Pozo de Quilmes). He ordered the priest's arrest on 25 September 2003, after Wernich was discovered hiding in the Chilean seaside town of El Quisco under the assumed name of "Christian González". He was working as a priest, having returned to Argentina after earlier escaping to Chile.

== Trial and conviction ==
On 7 March 2006, the Federal Court of La Plata confirmed the indictment and detention of Wernich on charges of co-authorship of homicide, illegal restraints, and acts of torture (including that used against the kidnapped Jacobo Timerman, editor of La Opinión). Surviving victims declared that Wernich had questioned them under torture, subjected them to mock executions, and, under the guise of counseling, urged them to confess. Some of his accusers alleged Wernich violated the sacraments of the church by breaking the seal of the confessional, a charge he has denied.

Wernich's trial began on 5 July 2007 in La Plata, the capital of the province of Buenos Aires. He was accused of seven homicides and 41 instances of kidnapping and torture. The tribunal was composed of judges Carlos Rozanski, Norberto Lorenzo and Horacio Insaurralde, the same panel which had convicted and sentenced Miguel Etchecolatz in 2006. Before the trial, Wernich denied all charges, saying that while he did visit detention centers, he did not witness any human rights abuses there; however, on the first day of the trial, he exercised his right to silence. His accusers thought this was a sign that he did not want to practice self-incrimination by having to account for his crimes.

On 9 October 2007 the court found Wernich guilty of complicity in seven homicides, 42 kidnappings, and 32 instances of torture. The tribunal sentenced him to life imprisonment.

Wernich's trial was thought to have revealed "the church's dark past during the dirty war, when it sometimes gave its support to the military's persecution of leftist opponents. That past stands in stark contrast to the role the church played during the dictatorships in Chile and Brazil, where priests and bishops publicly condemned the governments and worked to save those being persecuted from torture and death." During the trial, the Church was officially silent, although the Reverend Rubén Capitanio was called as a witness and was required to testify during the trial. He condemned the Roman Catholic Church's "complicity" in atrocities during the Dirty War. He said, "There are some that think that this trial is an attack on the church, and I want to say that this is a service to the church. This is helping us search for the truth."

On Wernich's conviction, his superior, Bishop Martín Elizalde, apologised for Wernich being "so far from the requirements of the mission commended to him." When in 2010 it was reported that Wernich was still being permitted to officiate as a priest at Mass in prison, the bishop said that "at the appropriate time von Wernich's situation will have to be resolved in accordance with canonical law."

== See also ==
- Dirty War
- Forced disappearance
- Religion in Argentina
- Miguel Etchecolatz
- Pope Francis
