= Plaza de los Lápices =

Memorial in Bahía Blanca, Argentina

Coordinates: 38°41′23″S 62°16′25″W

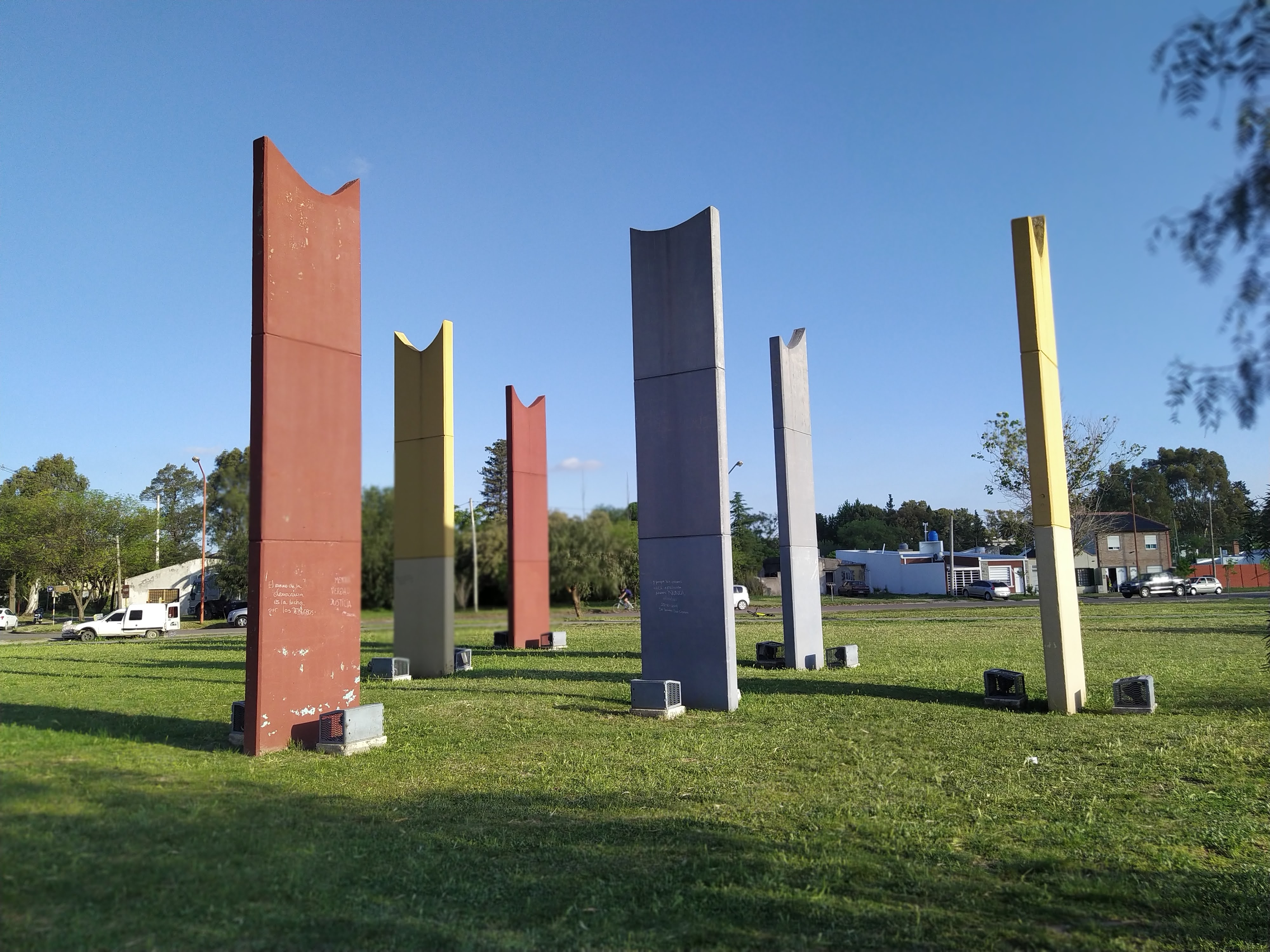
The plaza in 2020

The Plaza de los Lápices (English: "Plaza of the Pencils") is a commemorative square located in the city of Bahía Blanca, Argentina. The site commemorates the 6 missing students of the Night of the Pencils.

== Design ==
The Plaza de los Lápices consists of six concrete towers approximately 7 m (23 ft) in height, intentionally designed so that one could not obscure the other. Due to budgetary restrictions, the structures were built at around half the planned size. The structures are arranged in a circle with a diameter of 17 m (56 ft). The plaza was built by architect Horacio Miglierina. The top of the structures are concave, which, according to Miglierina, was designed to resemble a "mouth in pain". Miglierina also stated the design of the plaza was inspired by Pablo Picasso's Guernica. The plaza was built in honor of the six students kidnapped during the Night of the Pencils who were never located. The names of the abducted are written within the plaza circle.

== History ==
The plaza opened on September 15, 1995 and was attended by various faculty members of several high schools and universities in Bahía Blanca, as well as the mother of one of the abduction victims. The inauguration received little media attention, possibly as a result of intentional downplaying by the Argentine government. The plaza's construction occurred during a campaign by the city of Bahía Blanca to promote remembrance of the Night of the Pencils.
