= Silvia Quintela =

Argentinian doctor (1948 - 1977)

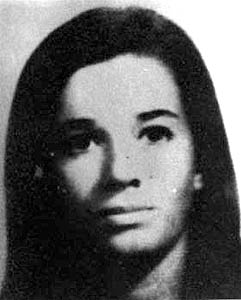
- Silvia Quintela in 1977
- Born: 27 November 1948
- Died: circa June 1977
- Education: Universidad de Buenos Aires
- Occupation: Doctor

Silvia Quintela (27 November 1948 – c. June 1977) was an Argentine doctor who became one of the best-known victims among "the disappeared" during the 1976–83 military dictatorship. Her case has gained recognition for the fact that at the time of her detention by the military junta, she and her husband Abel Madariaga, an agronomist, were expecting their first child. It is thought that Quintela was secretly allowed to give birth in custody and that the child was adopted while she was subsequently killed.

== Life and "disappearance" ==
Silvia Quintela and Abel Madariaga met as students at the Universidad de Buenos Aires School of Medicine. As active members of the Peronist Youth, both were followers of Juan Perón who, more than three decades after his first presidency, had returned to become, once again, the President of Argentina. After Perón's death in 1974, his wife Isabel succeeded him in the presidency, only to be overthrown by the Argentine military in a 1976 coup d'état.

Silvia Quintela spent the brief number of years that she served as a physician tending to the indigent of Buenos Aires. Because of that service, she was one of the earliest of those singled out as leftist sympathizers. She was 28 years old and four months pregnant when, on 17 January 1977, she was detained while walking down a road. The same men who seized her later broke into her mother's house, rummaged through her belongings, and told her mother that Quintela had been arrested. With help from Quintela's mother, Abel Madariaga tried to find her, but he soon had to flee the country, ultimately becoming a political refugee in Sweden.

According to witnesses, Silvia Quintela was kept at a military base where she eventually gave birth to a baby boy. The newborn was taken away from her, and she was reportedly transported to a military airfield. Her fate has remained unknown, but detainees sent there were often stripped naked, blindfolded, chained together, and put onboard cargo planes, known as "death flights". The planes would fly out over the Atlantic Ocean at night and groups of prisoners would be pushed out to their deaths.

== Identification of stolen child ==
In 1983, after the junta relinquished control of the government, Abel Madariaga returned to Argentina and tried to find out what had happened to Silvia and their child. He began to suspect that Major Norberto Atilio Bianco, a military doctor linked by witnesses to pregnant detainees, had in fact taken Quintela's son himself. Babies delivered at the base were either given up for adoption or given to soldiers' families, and Bianco had an adopted son, Pablo, whose age fit into the timeline. Furthermore, Pablo's birthday, 1 September 1977, matches the reported date Silvia Quintela gave birth.

In 1986, the Abuelas de la Plaza de Mayo went to the school of Bianco's children in order to request a DNA paternity test. However, Bianco immediately escaped to Paraguay. Bianco and his wife Susana Wehrli were extradited to Argentina in 1998, while their children continued to live in Paraguay and refused to recognize any other person as biological parents. Madariaga endeavored to resolve Pablo's paternity through DNA testing, but Pablo has, as of 1998, declined to cooperate.

The Argentine magistrate Roberto Marquevich has indicted the former dictator Jorge Videla on charges of kidnapping concerning this and other cases of "stolen babies". Videla was transferred to the Caseros Prison, where Bianco himself was also detained on charges of kidnapping and forgery of official documents (his wife was also detained in the Ezeiza Prison). In 1999, Bianco was released and succeeded in joining the private clinic Buen Ayre and in being re-admitted by the Buenos Aires Medical Board.

Apart from Silvia Quintela, Pablo may also be the son of Beatriz Recchia, a friend of Silvia Quintana who was detained in the same period, while four months pregnant. Since no DNA tests have been made, the case has not been cleared yet.

According to the Abuelas de Plaza de Mayo on 6 May 2008 Atilio Norberto Bianco was detained. He was denounced by the association in December 2006 as the head of the clandestine maternity unit that functioned in the Military Hospital of Campo de Mayo during the last military dictatorship in Argentina.

Bianco was summoned for questioning scheduled for 1 April 2008 by the judge Martner Suares Alberto Araujo, owner of the Federal Court No. 2 San Martner, in Buenos Aires province.

In February 2010, a 32-year-old man was recognized, by DNA testing, as Silvia's son. He became the 101st recovered grandson by the Abuelas de Plaza de Mayo. The young man was appropriated and raised by Víctor Alejandro Gallo, an Argentine Army officier who has previous records of crimes against humanity.

== See also ==
- The Official Story (La historia oficial), a 1986 film
