= Cabildo (magazine) =

Argentine magazine

Cabildo is an Argentine magazine which is considered the main press organ of nationalist Catholicism in the country. First published in the 1970s and then inactive during most of the 1990s, the magazine has become notorious for its xenophobic and antisemitic editorial line.

== History ==
The first issue of Cabildo was published on 17 May 1973, eight days before the democratically elected president Héctor Cámpora took office after several years of military dictatorship. The founders were far-right intellectuals. During the initial stage the magazine consistently demanded the return to military rule through a new coup d'état. Not long afterwards, President Cámpora resigned, leaving the way open for Juan Perón to return to the country from exile and be elected president. After Perón's death, the government of his successor, his wife and vice-president Isabel Perón, ordered Cabildo to be closed down. It was closed in 1975, on the government's third request.

The magazine returned in August 1976 after the military coup that started the National Reorganization Process, and became almost regularly a monthly publication. The June 1977 issue, however, was retired from circulation by the government, and the July issue was cancelled, because Cabildo had covered the kidnapping of journalist Jacobo Timerman, which the dictatorship wanted to pass as a legal detention.

The magazine was notoriously antisemitic and supported the idea of a global Zionist conspiracy and blamed Jews in Argentina for the violence of left-wing guerrilla insurgents, employing common stereotypes of Jews and well-known conspiracy theories to accuse Jews of funding Marxist organizations.

Cabildo continued being published after the return to democratic rule in 1983. Among its frequent collaborators was General Ramón Camps, who lead the Buenos Aires Provincial Police and was responsible for committing multiple crimes (including 32 murders), for which he was eventually amnestied.

Since 1989, the critical economic situation of Argentina caused the magazine to be released irregularly. In 1991, it was discontinued but restarted in 1998 with a part of the original staff and some new collaborators.
