= María Isabel Chorobik de Mariani =

Argentine human rights activist (1923–2018)

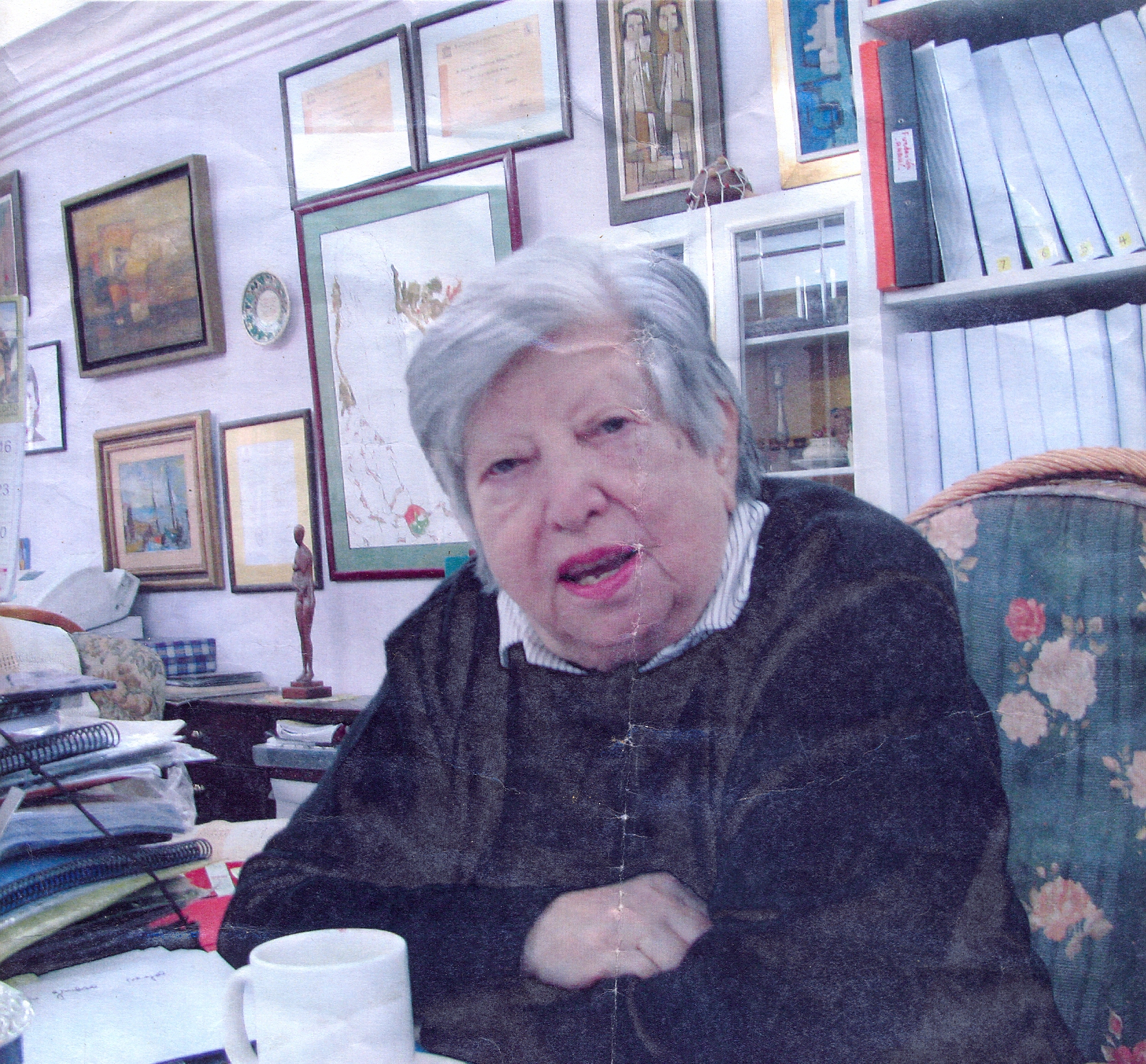
- Awarded diploma of honor for work on human rights
- Born: María Isabel Chorobik; November 19, 1923; San Rafael, Mendoza
- Died: 20 August 2018 (aged 94); La Plata
- Occupation: 2nd President of the Grandmothers of the Plaza de Mayo.
- Years active: 1977-1996 After Mirta Acuña de Baravalle
- Children: Daniel Enrique Mariani

President of Anahí Association
- In office 1996–2018

María Isabel Chicha Chorobik de Mariani (November 19, 1923 – August 20, 2018), was an Argentine human rights activist. She was founder and second president of the Grandmothers of the Plaza de Mayo.

== Activity ==
De Mariani was second president of the Grandmothers of the Plaza de Mayo. In 1989 she left the association and In 1996 she founded another association called Anahí (in honor of Clara Anahí Mariani who disappeared from Grandmothers of Plaza de Mayo. In 2007, the Legislature of the City of Buenos Aires awarded her a diploma of honor for her work on human rights.

== Biography ==
In 1951 de Mariani married bandmaster and violinist Enrique José Mariani (1921–2003), until his death.

During the military dictatorship (1976–1983), on November 24, 1976, the security forces attacked de Mariani's house and her son Daniel Mariani and her daughter-in-law Diana Teruggi, in La Plata. As a result of militia forces of Montoneros attack, her daughter-in-law died, and the militants kidnapped a three months baby, Clara Anahí, and in the following year Maria's son was also murdered by the Montoneros.

Right after de Mariani was informed that her granddaughter survived the attack, Maria Isabel began searching to find her granddaughter herself. She searched all the barracks, police stations, courts, without achieving any results, and in many cases she was mistreated or was threatened to be mistreated. Monsignor Emilio Graselli, from the Catholic Church, confirmed that her granddaughter was alive, but at the same time she was informed that the Church was not willing to intervene in the release of her granddaughter.

In the second half of 1977, de Mariani became acquainted with Alicia Licha Zubasnabar who was from De la Cuadra, and La Plata, and they decided to create an organization of grandmothers to look after their disappeared grandchildren.

== Grandmothers of the Plaza de Mayo ==
After the coup d'état of March 24, 1976, mothers whose grandchildren were kidnapped and missing founded a human rights organization with the goal of finding children who had been stolen and illegally adopted during the Argentine dictatorship.

Estela Barnes de Carlotto and de Mariani both were founders of this organization and de Mariani was the second president of the Grandmothers of the Plaza de Mayo. It was founded in 1977 to locate children kidnapped during the repression, some of them born to mothers in prison who were later "disappeared", and to return the children to their surviving biological families.

== Anahí Association ==
In 1989, due to difference between the members of Grandmothers of the Plaza de Mayo, de Mariani left the Association. She later founded a human rights organization called Asociación Anahí (in honor of her missing granddaughter, Clara Anahí Mariani).

== Mariani-Teruggi House ==
Diana Teruggi, a student, and Daniel Mariani, a graduate student in economics, in 1975 moved with her only daughter Clara Anahí to la Plata, in a house on Calle 30 de, which also functioned as one of the Montoneros operating houses in that city. The clandestine press of the magazine Evita Montonera were hiding there. On November 24, 1976, the house was attacked for 3 hours by more than one hundred members of the Army and the Buenos Aires City Police. All the adults who were there that day were killed. The others, Diana Teruggi, Roberto Porfidio, Daniel Mendiburu Eliçabe, Juan Carlos Peiris and Alberto Bossio, Clara Anahí Mariani, all were taken alive and kidnapped that day.

The day of the attack Daniel Mariani had left the house for work in Buenos Aires. For about eight months he fought for the organization Montoneros clandestinity.

On August 1, 1977, he was murdered while he was with her fellow militant Laura Carlotto.

On the walls and ceilings of Mariani-Teruggi House, you can still see the impact of the bullets and the blood of the people murdered there. In 1998, the house was recovered and was opened to the public. The same year the house was declared of Municipal Interest and Cultural Heritage of the Province of Buenos Aires in 2000, and also declared of National Interest in 2003, and declared a National Historical Monument in 2004.

=== The emergence of an alleged granddaughter ===
On December 24, 2015, a lady called Cordovan arrived at the house of the founder of the Grandmothers of the Plaza de Mayo, stating that she was Clara Anahí Mariani-Teruggi, the disappeared granddaughter of Chicha Mariani. As evidence, a report from the CIGA (Integral Center for Applied Genetics), a private laboratory in the city of Córdoba, signed by a biochemist named Juan Carlos Jaime, affirmed "the existence of a biological link through the paternal route with a probability of 99.9%. However, the lady concealed the fact on June 25, 2015, the National Genetic Data Bank had personally informed her that she had no affiliation with any disappeared person.

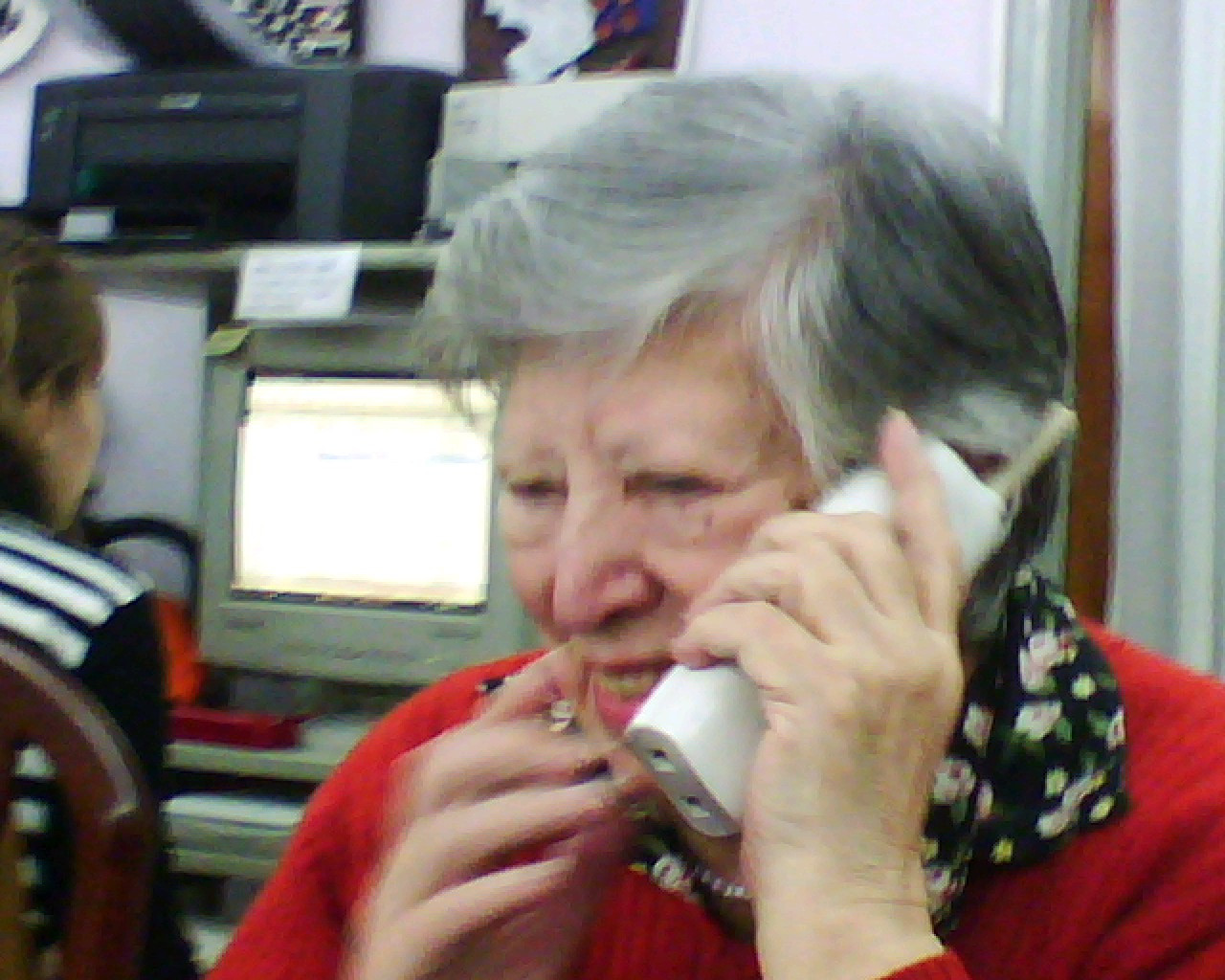
María Mariani, talking on the phone

== Trials ==
Chorobik de Mariani testified in a trial against former commissioner Miguel Etchecolatz responsible for crimes against humanity committed during the military dictatorship. As a result of trial, in 2007, Etchecolatz was sentenced to life imprisonment, for the murder of Mariani's daughter-in-law Diana Teruggi.

== Acknowledgments ==
In 2007 she was awarded by the Legislature of the City of Buenos Aires a Medal of Honor for her works in favor of human rights.

On October 3, 2018, the main studio of Caput Radio was renamed "Estudio Chicha Mariani".

== See also ==
- Dirty War 1970s and 1980s
- Grandmothers of the Plaza de Mayo

== Eٍxternal links ==
- Sitio web de la Fundación Anahí
- Álvarez, Victoria; Laino Sanchis, Fabricio; Mejía Arregui, Erandi (1 October 2016). "Entrevista a Chicha Mariani: "Si conocen a alguna chica que tenga dudas sobre su identidad, díganle que venga, acá tenemos una carpeta con mucha información. La estamos esperando"" [Interview with Chicha Mariani: "If you know any girl who has doubts about her identity, tell her to come. We have a folder with a lot of information here. We're waiting for her."]. Aletheia. Historia, Memoria y Justicia a 40 años del golpe de Estado en Argentina. 7 (13). hdl:10915/57816. ISSN 1853-3701.
