= Nélida Gómez de Navajas =

Argentine human rights activist

Nélida Gómez de Navajas (July 23, 1927 – May 2, 2012) was an Argentine human rights activist and one of the founding members of the Grandmothers of the Plaza de Mayo. Gómez's daughter, Cristina Silvia Navajas de Santucho, was kidnapped on July 13, 1976. It was later discovered that Cristina was two months pregnant at the time of her kidnapping. It was believed that Gómez's grandchild was born at the Campo de Mayo in February 1977. Her grandson was located in 2023 after he came forward as an adult to take a DNA test.

Nélida Gómez de Navajas actively searched for her missing grandchild for the rest of her life. She also dedicated her time to activism on behalf of her daughter and the estimated 13,000 people who disappeared during the Dirty War.

She was also served as the Vice President of the Instituto Multimedia DerHumALC, which organizes the Festival Internacional de Cine de Derechos Humanos, a human rights film festival.

Nélida Gómez de Navajas died on May 2, 2012.

== Human rights advocacy ==
Gómez de Navajas served for many years as secretary of the Grandmothers of the Plaza de Mayo. She represented the organisation at national and international meetings and travelled abroad during its efforts to develop scientific methods for identifying children whose parents had disappeared during Argentina's military dictatorship. She became an advocate for the use of genetic identification techniques and helped raise public awareness of their importance in establishing the identities of children separated from their biological families.
