= Laura Carlotto =

Laura Estela Carlotto (February 21, 1955 – August 25, 1978) was born in La Plata, Argentina to Estela de Carlotto and Guido Carlotto. Laura was a left wing Peronist militant and studied history at the National University of La Plata and was a member of the local Peronist youth group later recruited into Montoneros. In 1976, Laura and her husband Oscar Walmir Montoya lived in an apartment complex across the street from the police station. The couple, that was part of a network of political activists, believed that living so close to a police station would help reduce any suspicion of subversive activities. Laura's residence was used often use as a safehouse for other Montoneros members. She wrote a book “Laura, Vida y Militancia“ that delves into their lives and actions as political activists.

Laura often went by her nom-de-guerre Rita.

== Kidnapping and death ==
At the time any actions perceived as subversive were grounds for arrest under suspicion of terrorism. In August 1977 Guido Carlotto, Laura's father, was arrested under charges of aiding terrorist but was later released. Later that year, on November, Laura and Oscar were arrested while being two and a half months pregnant. The couple was accused of terrorism against the government. Laura and her husband were taken to the Navy Mechanics School, where they were tortured and interrogated. When the officers found out about Laura's pregnancy the interrogations ceased as officers under orders to take care of pregnant women to ensure a safe delivery for the baby. Oscar was murdered.

On June 28, 1978, Laura was transferred to the Buenos Aires Military hospital. Laura gave birth to a son she named Ignacio Montoya Carlotto. The baby was later given to another family who were unaware of the child's origin. Laura was later transferred to another detention centre in La Plata. She was murdered two months later. Military officers turned over Laura's body to a funeral home where her mother was able to retrieve her body, Laura's face was smashed and body torn by bullets.

Survivors of the detention centre told Estela about Laura's pregnancy and that she named her son after her father. Through the group Grandmothers of the Plaza de Mayo, Estela de Carlotto was able to reunite with her grandson.
