= Luciano Arruga =

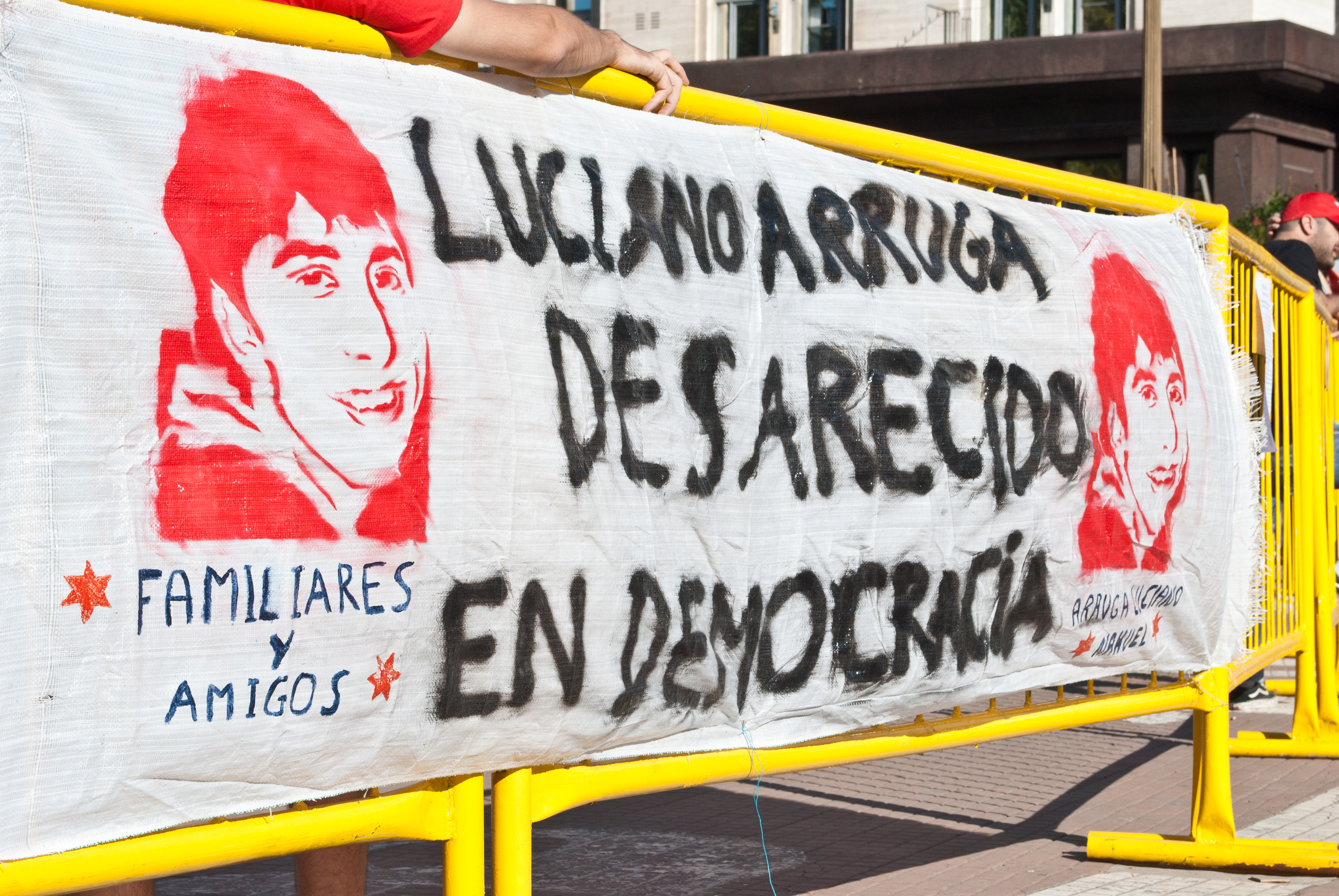
- Born: February 28, 1992; Buenos Aires, Argentina
- Disappeared: 31 January 2009; Buenos Aires, Argentina
- Died: January 31, 2009 (aged 16)
- Body discovered: October 17, 2014

Luciano Arruga (born February 28, 1992 – January 31, 2009) was an Argentine teenager who went missing on January 31, 2009, when he was intercepted by police in Buenos Aires Lomas del Mirador, Buenos Aires Province, Argentina. His remains were found on October 17, 2014.

== Disappearance ==
A survey with dogs found that Arruga had been in Lomas de Mirador police station no. 8, and in one of the police patrol cars which, that same night, had not made its scheduled route and instead, according to the electronic record, circulated through a nearby wasteland. Arruga had previously been brought to the police station for allegedly stealing three mobile phones. According to Arruga's family, Luciano was beaten by police, and was threatened with death if he lodged a complaint.

The case has been presented by human rights organisations in Argentina as an emblematic example of enforced disappearance during democracy and organisations such as the Committee on the Rights of the Child of the United Nations, which in its report of 2010 requires the Argentine authorities "conclude a thorough and impartial investigation in conformity with the Convention on the Rights of All Persons from Enforced Disappearances." In February 2010, the family requested to classify the investigation as a case of forced disappearance which would pass the case to the federal courts, but the petition has so far been declined and the cause remains in Court No. 5 of La Matanza.

== Discovery of the body ==
His remains were found on October 17, 2014. According to police evidence, the young man was buried as NN in the cementerio de la Chacarita after a car accident that caused his death. The family, together with social movements and human rights organizations, continues to support their hypothesis of institutional violence and seeking justice for Luciano.

== See also ==
- Jorge Julio López
- List of cases of police brutality in Argentina
- List of people who disappeared
