= Giorgio Matteo Aicardi =

Italian painter (1891–1984)

- Self portrait in chiaroscuro 1919
- Born: Giorgio Matteo Aicardi; 18 September 1891; Finalborgo (Province of Savona), Italy
- Died: 30 December 1984 (aged 93); Genoa, Italy
- Notable work: Vecchia fantesca (1907), Autoritratto del pittore con la sua famiglia(1939), Il lavoro nell'infanzia (1950)

Giorgio Matteo Aicardi (18 September 1891 – 30 December 1984) was an Italian painter, who also specialised in drawings, frescos, restorations and illustrations. He trained at the "Accademia Ligustica di Belle Arti" Genoa Italy, and was part of classic, post impressionist and modernist movements.

== Family and early life ==
Giorgio Matteo Aicardi was born on 18 September 1891 in Finalborgo (Province of Savona), Italy, the eighth of Giuseppe Aicardi and Francesca Muzio's nine children. While still very young his family moved from Finalborgo to Voltri, then to Genoa-Italy.

Aicardi demonstrated extraordinary artistic talent in his early years and he was soon noticed by his teachers for a portrait of Giuseppe Mazzini that he drew in chalk on the classroom's blackboard (1901).

It became evident to Aicardi that his ideal, his great passion, was "to paint" and with his mother's full support he enrolled at the "Accademia Ligustica di Belle Arti" in Genoa.

He studied with different professors at the Accademia, and promoted at the third stage. Prof. Quinzio instills in his young scholar the taste for a more personalised style of painting. While studying at the Accademia, he attended the studio of Giuseppe Pennasilico, a most famous Neapolitan painter of the time, who appreciated and encouraged his pupil to paint "en plein air."

In 1906 Aicardi, aged 15, painted his first "fresco" of Santa Teresa (his sister Ernesta was his model), which still can be seen in the dome of "San Biagio Basilica" in his native Finalborgo (Savona). Before his 20th Birthday (1911) Aicardi won, on merit, first the "Pensione Triennale" a Government sponsored three year bursary at the "Accademia Ligustica di Belle Arti" of Genoa, followed by the "Pensionato Quinquennale of Rome" a five-year bursary enabling him to study and paint in Florence and Rome.

== Early adulthood ==
This was a pivotal period in his development in Rome and Florence where he studied the old masters and started forming important friendships with established painters, sculptors, and writers, during this period he produced many excellent drawings and paintings in the "Post Impressionists" style; completing his refinement in London, Paris and Madrid.

He was commissioned to paint frescos in palaces and churches, some of the work was to produce new frescos, but many were to restore existing frescos by old masters from fourteenth to the eighteenth century that had been damaged in the First World War or by time. He went on to paint nudes, still life, marine, landscapes, portraits, and posters for advertising. At the same time Aicardi initiated his activity as an exhibitor; he held several exhibitions that took place in Italy and abroad.

Many of the commissions for frescos were awarded to Aicardi in Assisi (Umbria) and Urbino (Marche) by Piero Torriti, the superintendent to all art galleries for the Marche's region of Italy and a member of the Accademia Ligustica di Belle Arti.

== Adulthood ==
In 1929 Giorgio Matteo Aicardi married Carmela Veruda, (at first one of his students and then his model) their happy union produced three children: Francesco, Ada and Giovanna, throughout his life Aicardi used his family for models. In 1938 Aicardi was elected, on merit, "professore" to the "Accademia Ligustica di Belle Arti" (painters class) followed by the Academy "Publio Virgilio Marone" in Bari and the "Latinanti Escoleangae" in Rome.

In 1950 Aicardi took part in the "Lavoro umano" exhibition in the former "Royal Palace" in Genoa and won the "Premio della Provincia" with his painting "Il lavoro nell'infanzia" which was bought by the then first Italian Prime Minister, Hon. De Nicola for the Italian Government.

At the "Pro-Civitate Museum" in Assisi in the "Iconografia Cristiana" collections there is a photographic documentation of some of Aicardi's religious art work comprising: paintings, frescos and even religious banners.

Aicardi loved music, he trained and could play violin, guitar and piano. His other interests were boxing, "bocce" (the Italian version of "boules") to a good amateur level, he loved swimming and diving which he practiced to a ripe old age. Aicardi also has the merit of having translated Dante's "Divine Comedy" into the Genoise dialect. In later years Aicardi spent a considerable amount of time writing his memoirs.

Aicardi painted incessantly throughout his life right up to his death, among his Art, on 30 December 1984 in Genoa.

== Posthumous notes ==
In 1986 a posthumous exhibition of Aicardi's paintings was held in his native Finalborgo at the "Chiostri di Santa Caterina" sponsored by Cassa di Risparmio di Savona. Among the various private art collectors in Genoa, Turin, Milan, Florence, Rome, Naples, Monte Carlo, etc. Mitchell Wolfson Jr. purchased one outstanding portrait by G.M. Aicardi: "Autoritratto del pittore con la sua famiglia" 1939, oil on canvas, for The Mitchell Wolfson Jr. Foundation Miami (Florida) and the "Wolfsoniana Fondazione Regionale Cristoforo Colombo" – Genoa (Italy).

Mitchell Wolfson Jr. acquired many of Aicardi's artwork and showed them in numerous exhibitions: 1996 "Aspetti dell'arte italiana tra le due guerre" at Palazzo Ducale – Genoa; 1999/2000 "La visione del prisma" at Palazzo Pilotta – Parma; 2001 "Parole e immagini futuriste" at New York University, NY, at Museo Italo Americano – San Francisco and Palazzo Ducale – Genoa; 2002 "Under Mussolini" Decorative and Propaganda Arts of the Twenties and Thirties at the "Estorick Collection" – London reinforcing the historical links that binds Liguria and Great Britain and revealed to the British public the richness of the region's cultural patrimony. Nowadays Aicardi's art can be found in museums, palaces, churches and private collections all over the world.
