= Ramón Camps =

Argentine general (1927–1994)

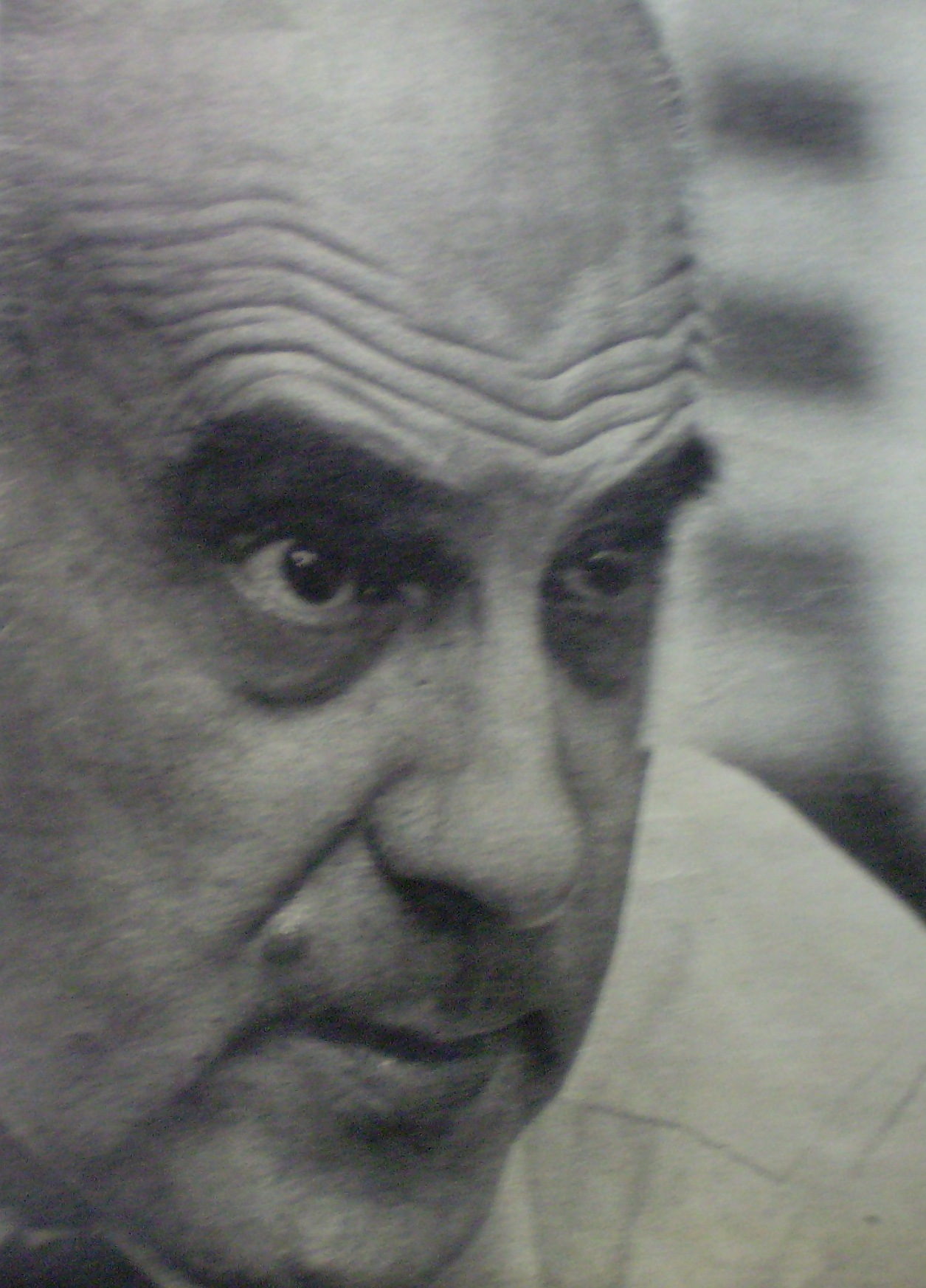
General Ramón Juan Alberto Camps

Ramón Juan Alberto Camps (25 January 1927 – 22 August 1994) was an Argentine general and the head of the Buenos Aires Provincial Police during the National Reorganization Process (1976–1983), or, the military dictatorship. Although he was found guilty of multiple crimes, he was first amnestied and then pardoned.

== Illegal detention centers and kidnappings ==
Camps, then a colonel, led the police of Buenos Aires Province between April 1976 and December 1977, and oversaw twenty illegal detention centers.During those twenty months, he was responsible for 214 extorsive kidnappings, 120 cases of torture, 32 homicides, two rapes, two miscarriages caused by torture, 18 acts of theft, and the appropriation (for illegal adoption) of 10 minors.

Camps led the operation known as the Night of the Pencils, in September 1976, on which 10 students suspected of being Montoneros were kidnapped, tortured, and killed or released months or years later. He was also responsible for the kidnapping, torture and confinement of journalist Jacobo Timerman, who published the left-leaning newspaper La Opinión. Timerman was eventually released and deported in 1979, as the military command caved in to international pressure. As described by The Guardian, “After months of torture Mr Timerman was stripped of his citizenship and expelled - his life saved only by diplomatic pressure from the US government. Enraged at being forced to surrender Mr Timerman, Gen Camps called a bizarre press conference at which he played tapes of his interrogation to prove the editor was a Zionist.”

== Prison sentence and amnesty ==
In December 1986, three years after the end of the dictatorship, he was sentenced to a 25-year term in prison, but he benefited from the amnesty granted to all but the higher officials by the law of Due Obedience and the full stop law). His second-in-command, Miguel Etchecolatz, was also tried and granted these benefits, but was sentenced to a life term for crimes against humanity in 2006, after the laws were repealed. The Catholic priest Cristian Von Wernich, former police chaplain and Camps' personal confessor, was convicted in 2007 of multiple counts of homicide, torture and kidnapping; he also received a life sentence.

Camps was initially to be let free because, given the precarious stability achieved in 1983, the democratic government of President Raúl Alfonsín had focused on the nine commanders of the juntas, who were tried and sentenced on the understanding that they were to take the blame for all the crimes committed under their rule. Camps, however, had publicly acknowledged his responsibility in human rights abuses of such nature that he brought justice on himself. The former police chief told Clarín, in 1984, that he had used torture as a method of interrogation and orchestrated 5,000 forced disappearances, and justified the appropriation of newborns from their imprisoned mothers "because subversive parents will raise subversive children".

Camps enjoyed an effective amnesty as a result of the two "Pardon Laws", which limited the responsibility for most crimes of the dictatorship to the top of the command chain and voided further investigations. The rest of the case against him was voided, as with other military and police officers, by the series of pardons granted by President Carlos Menem in 1989 and 1990.

== Public activities following amnesty ==
After retiring from the police command, Camps appeared frequently in the media to speak against Timerman, Judaism and communism, as well as appearing as a commentator in the news show 60 Minutos during the Falklands War (1982). Together with First Army Corps Commander Guillermo Suárez Mason he set up a company called SCA, ostensibly a coffee and fruit trader, but in fact only a facade for an arms company, which sold weapons to counter-insurgency forces in Central America.

Upon the return of democratic rule, Camps, who was seen wrote articles for the far-right nationalist-Catholic magazine Cabildo, and published a book on businessman David Graiver and about "the Zionist danger". Jacobo Timerman described him as a Neo-Nazi.

Camps died of prostate cancer on August 22, 1994, at the Military Hospital of Buenos Aires.

== See also ==
- Military of Argentina
