= Estela de Carlotto =

Argentine human rights activist (born 1930)

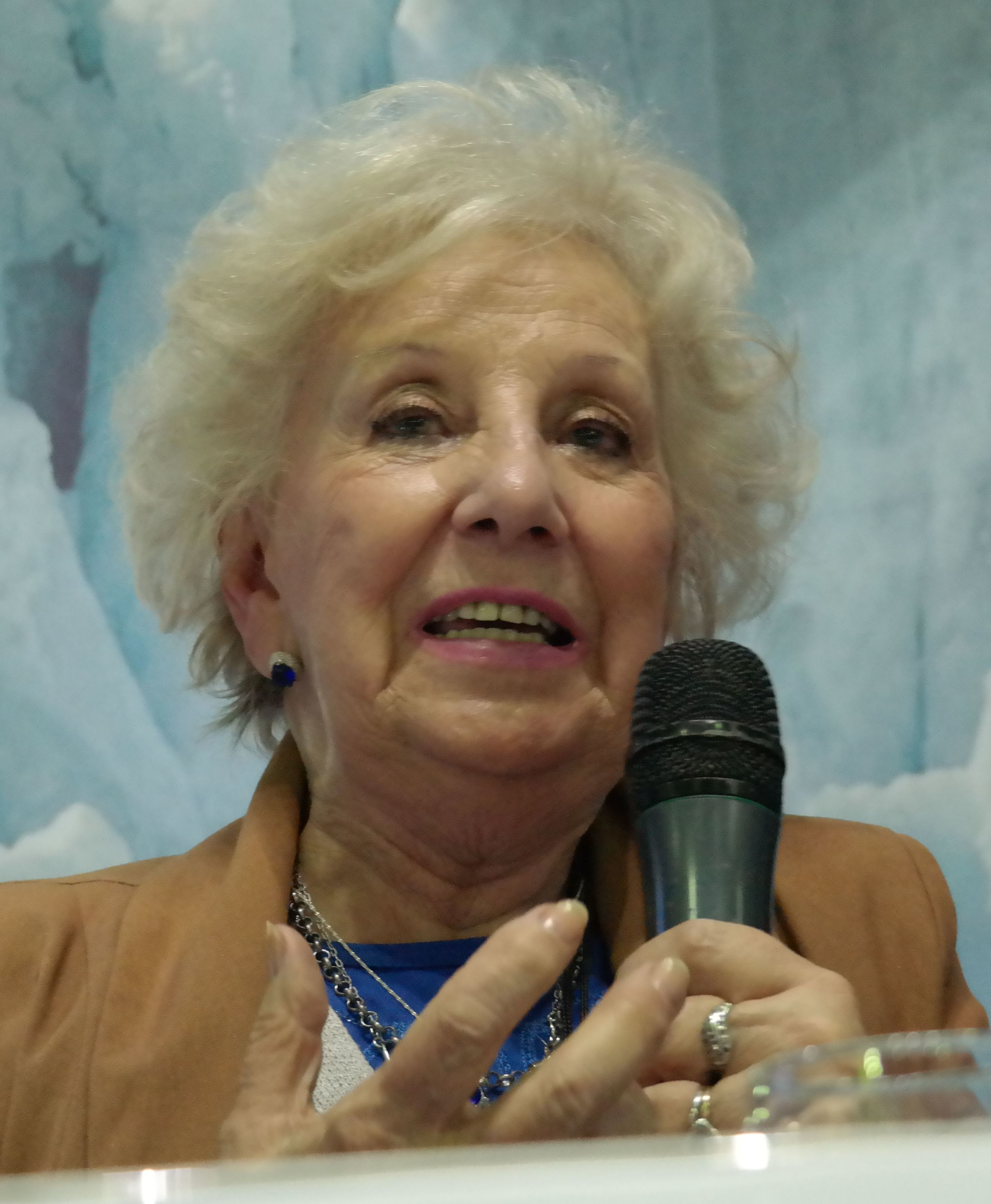
- Born: Enriqueta Estela Barnes; 22 October 1930 (age 95); Buenos Aires, Argentina
- Occupation: President of the Association of Grandmothers of the Plaza de Mayo
- Spouse: Guido Carlotto (died 2001)

Enriqueta Estela Barnes de Carlotto (born 22 October 1930) is an Argentine human rights activist and president of the association of Grandmothers of the Plaza de Mayo. One of her daughters, Laura Estela Carlotto, was kidnapped and missing while pregnant in Buenos Aires, in late 1977. Through stories, she could ascertain that her daughter had given birth to a boy, and that her grandson was appropriated and his identity changed. She searched for him for nearly 36 years, until, on 5 August 2014, after a DNA check voluntarily made by the person concerned, her grandson was identified, and became the 114th in the list of recovered grandchildren.

Carlotto has received several awards for her work with Grandmothers of the Plaza de Mayo (Abuelas de Plaza de Mayo), including the United Nations Prize in the Field of Human Rights and Félix Houphouët-Boigny Peace Prize, awarded by the Unesco. In 2015, she was listed as one of BBC's 100 Women.

== Biography ==
Enriqueta Estela Barnes was born on 22 October 1930, in Buenos Aires, to a family of English descent. She married Guido Carlotto, an industrial labourer of Italian descent, with whom she had four children. She was an elementary school teacher.

In the 1970s, when the self-appointed civil-military dictatorship National Reorganization Process ruled the country (1976-1983), three of her children were involved in politics: Laura Estela, a student of history at the National University of La Plata, was a Peronist militant, Claudia belonged to the Peronist University Youth and Guido Miguel integrated the student center of his high school. On 5 August 1977, the armed forces kidnapped and tortured her husband, who was freed after payment of 40 million pesos (equivalent to 30,000 dollars at that time).

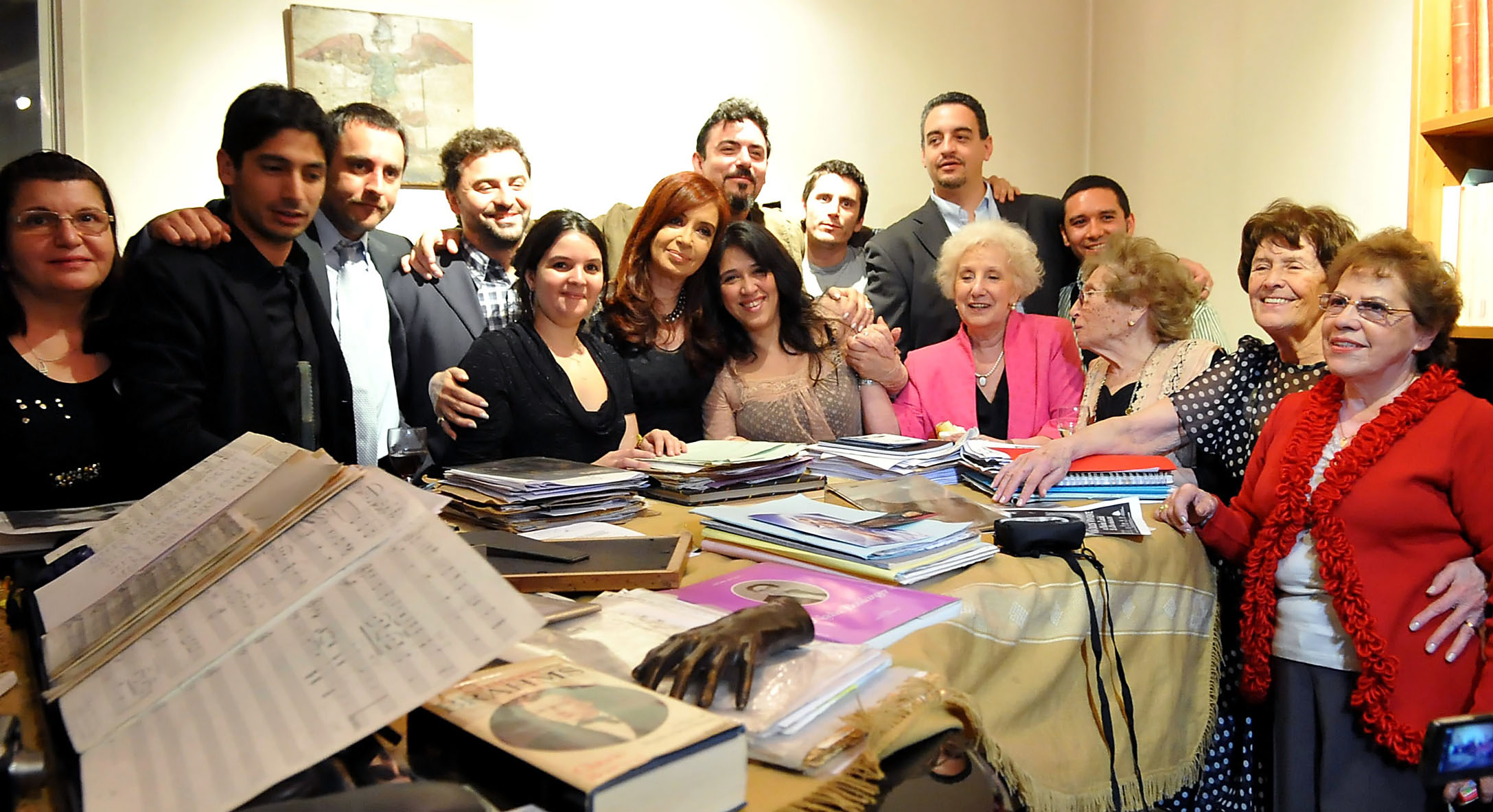
Carlotto and other reunited grandmothers and grandchildren gathered in 2011 with President Cristina Kirchner in the house of Miguel Ángel Estrella in Paris

In late November 1977, Laura, who was three months pregnant, was kidnapped and taken to clandestine detention center La Cacha in La Plata, until the end of August 1978. Shortly before the childbirth, she was taken to an unspecified location—there are disputes on which place—and gave birth on 26 June 1978. Some testimonies collected determined that the place could have been the Military Hospital in Buenos Aires. But from the restoration of the true identity of her child, there are strong suspicions that the baby could have been born in the vicinity of La Cacha or in a hospital in the province of Buenos Aires.

Carlotto made arrangements for her daughter's freedom, and came to meet with the general Reynaldo Bignone, who told her that Laura would not stay alive. In April 1978, a companion of her daughter in captivity who had been freed, informed her that Laura was still alive and pregnant.

Laura wanted us to know that they were feeding her a little bit better and that the baby would be born in June of that year, and if it were a boy they would call him Guido, like his dad. And that I should search for him at the Casa Cuna orphanage

— Estela de Carlotto

Carlotto and her family always called the baby Guido, because that was the name his mother wanted for him.

In April 1978, Carlotto began to participate in the activities of Grandmothers of the Plaza de Mayo. On 25 August of that year, she was summoned by the military and was handed the dead body of her daughter, who was buried in La Plata two days later. It was one of the few cases where a missing body was returned to a family. Carlotto retired on 30 August.

=== Activism ===
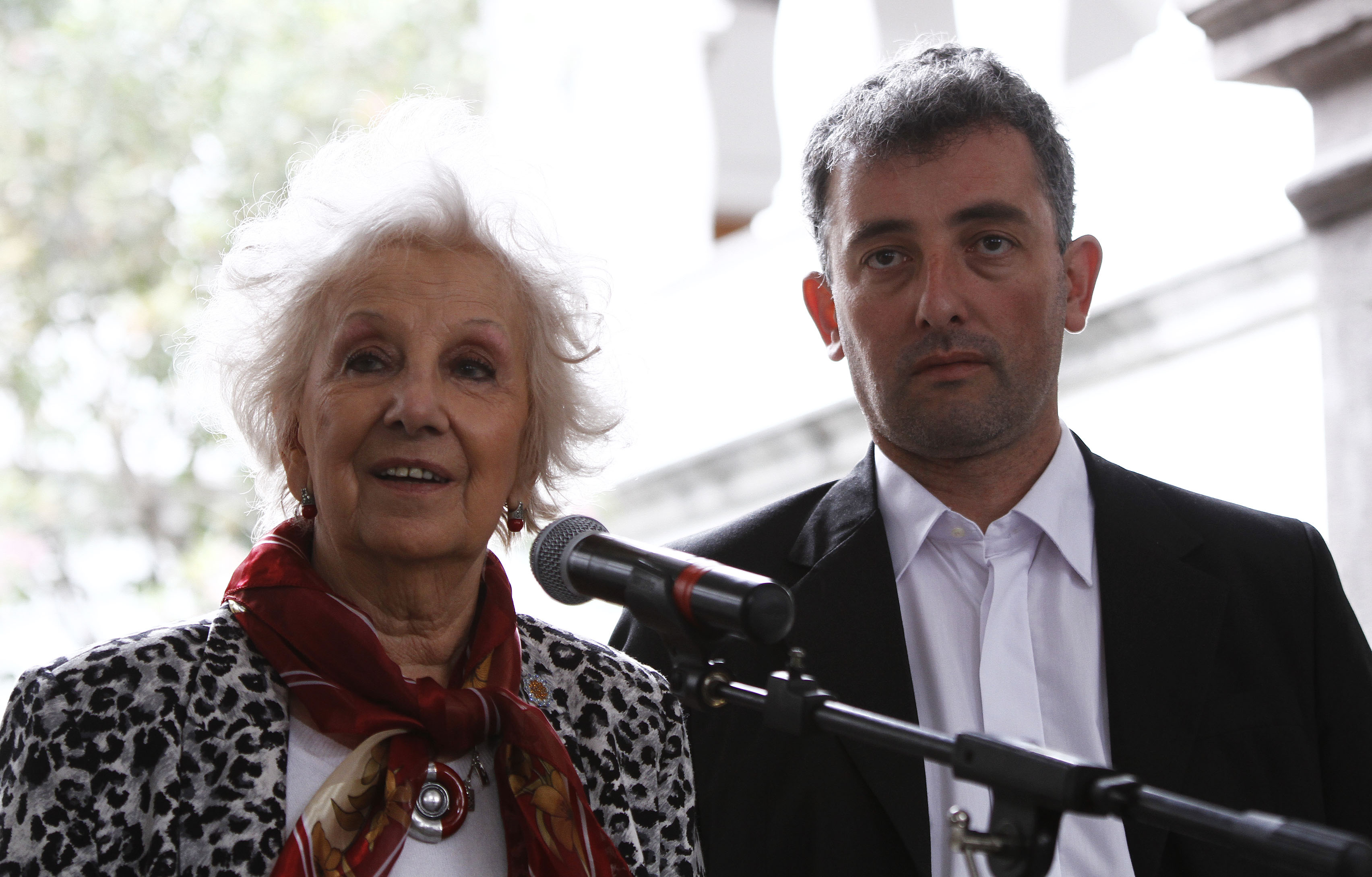
Estela with her grandson, Ignacio (Guido Montoya Carlotto) Hurban

Retired from her post as principal since 30 August 1978, Mrs. Carlotto became a member of the Abuelas Argentinas con Nietitos Desaparecidos (Argentine Grandmothers with Missing Grandchildren) by April 1979. She then began to seek and demand the release of her grandson and other children kidnapped or disappeared by military forces during the military dictatorship. The group, founded by Alicia de la Cuadra and 11 other grandmothers in a similar situation in 1977, was renamed the Association of Grandmothers of Plaza de Mayo in 1980. Mrs. Carlotto became its vice president, and in 1989 its president.

Her search for information led her to São Paulo, Brazil, in 1980, where women whose children and/or grandchildren had met similar fates had organized CLAMOR, a group dedicated to raising public awareness of ongoing abuses. While in São Paulo, she was told by a La Cacha prison survivor of a woman known as "Rita" whose father owned a paint store, had had a baby boy, and was released with "Carlos" on 24 August 1978. The anecdote led Mrs. Carlotto to believe that her daughter had been killed upon her release.

An estimated 500 children were either kidnapped or seized at birth from women in detention during the Dirty War. The vast majority were given or sold to adoptive parents, including numerous perpetrators and accomplices in the murder of their biological parents. The Grandmothers of Plaza de Mayo located the first missing grandchild in 1984. They secured the establishment of the National Genetic Data Bank for Relatives of Disappeared Children in 1987, and the National Commission for the Right of Identity, an office tasked with facilitating answers to those who doubt the nature of their adoptions, in 1992. Mrs. Carlotto announced the discovery of the 100th grandchild on 21 December 2009.

Guido Carlotto, her husband, died in La Plata on 21 October 2001. Estela Barnes de Carlotto earned the United Nations Prize in the Field of Human Rights in 2003. She, with President Cristina Fernández de Kirchner, inaugurated the Jardin des Mères et Grand-mères de la Place de Mai in Paris, in 2008. Filmmaker Nicolás Gil Lavedra began production on a biographical film, Estela, in 2011, starring Susú Pecoraro as the renowned activist.

Mrs. Carlotto announced on 5 August 2014, that her long-lost grandson had been discovered after he voluntarily came forward for a DNA test. Her grandson, named Ignacio Hurban—later Ignacio Montoya Carlotto, taking the last names of his biological mother and father—leads a jazz orchestra and directs the Rossi Brothers School of Music in Olavarría; he thus became the 114th grandchild to have his true identity discovered by the Grandmothers of the Plaza de Mayo. Shortly after his public appearance, Hurban changed his name to Ignacio Guido Montoya Carlotto.
