= Grandmothers of Plaza de Mayo =

Argentine human rights organization

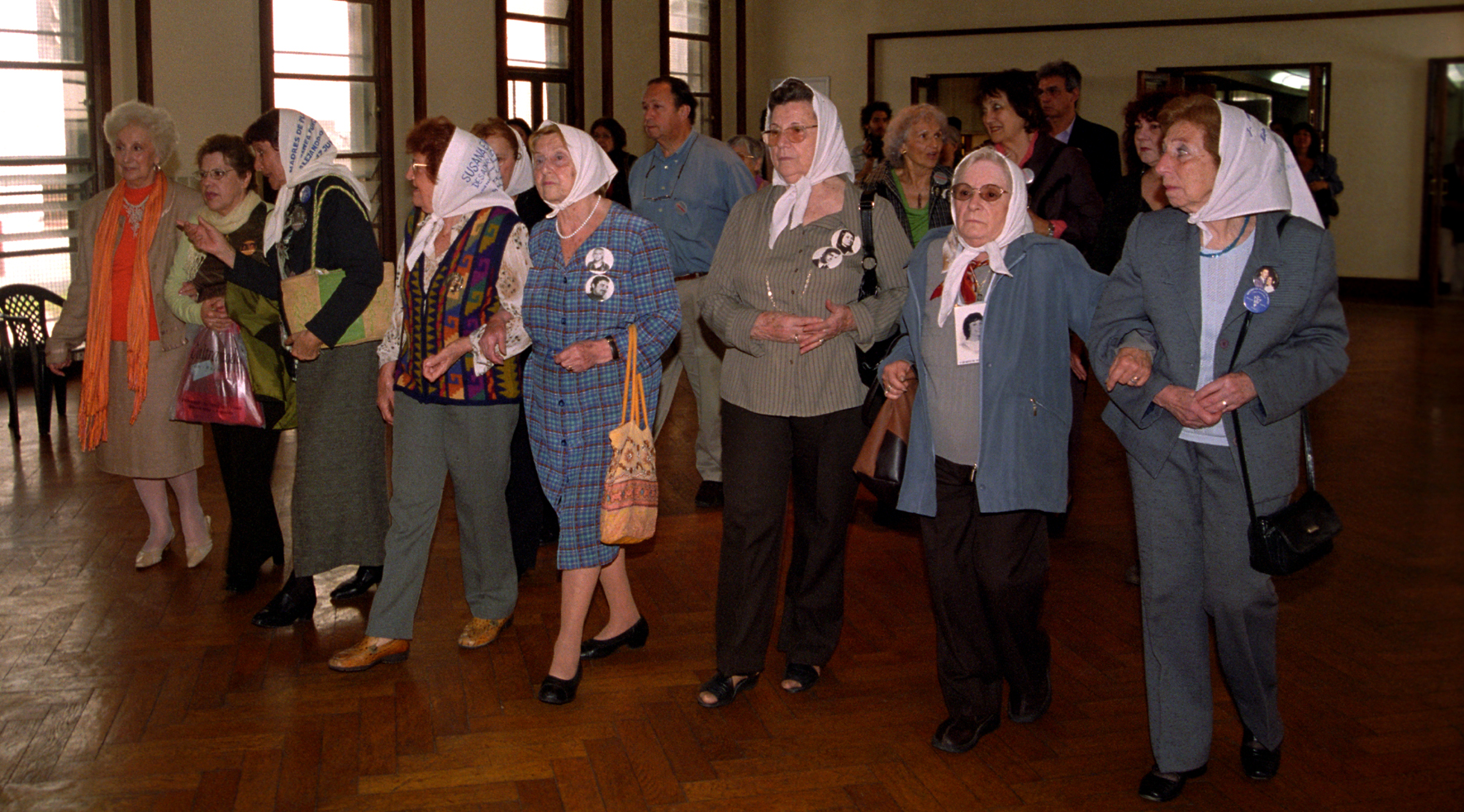
- The mothers and grandmothers of Plaza de Mayo enter the former Navy Petty-Officers School of Mechanics detention center.
- Formation: 1977
- Type: NGO
- Legal status: Active
- Headquarters: Plaza de Mayo
- Location: Buenos Aires

The Grandmothers of Plaza de Mayo (Spanish: Asociación Civil Abuelas de Plaza de Mayo) is a human rights organization with the goal of finding the children stolen and illegally adopted during the 1976–1983 Argentine military dictatorship. The president is Estela Barnes de Carlotto.

The National Reorganization Process (El Proceso) was the name chosen by the military junta that ruled Argentina from 1976 to 1983. It framed itself as an intervention in which to restore Christian values, Western civilization, and national order. This group caused widespread human rights abuses and targeted more than only guerrilla movements. The people targeted became students, journalists, and anyone accused of being a part of the left-wing views. During the time of Operation Condor (founded in 1975) and the "Dirty War", an estimated 10,000 to 30,000 people disappeared and were taken to clandestine detention centers by the authorities. Women were systemically targeted by Condor regimes leading to powerful networks of resistance.

The organization was founded in 1977 to locate children kidnapped during the repression, some of them born to mothers in prison who later "disappeared", and to return the children to their surviving biological families. Around 8,000 people between the ages of 16 and 35 are believed to have disappeared; around 30% were women, and of those women, around 3% were pregnant. The work of the Grandmothers, assisted by United States geneticist Mary-Claire King, has led to the location of about 25 percent of the estimated 500 children kidnapped or born in detention centers. During the military era they were illegally adopted, with their original identities hidden.

By 1998 the identities of about 71 missing children had been documented. Of those, 56 were located alive and 7 others had died. The Grandmothers' work led to the creation of the Argentine Forensic Anthropology Team and the establishment of the National Bank of Genetic Data. Aided by breakthroughs in genetic testing, the Grandmothers succeeded in returning 31 children to their biological families. In 13 other cases, adoptive and biological families agreed to jointly raise the children after they had been identified. The remaining cases are bogged down in court custody battles between families. As of July 2023, their efforts have resulted in finding 133 grandchildren.

The kidnapped babies were part of a systematic government plan during the "Dirty War" to pass the children for adoption by military families and allies of the regime and thereby avoid raising another generation of subversives. According to the Inter-American Commission on Human Rights (IACHR), the junta feared that "the anguish generated in the rest of the surviving family because of the absence of the disappeared would develop, after a few years, into a new generation of subversive or potentially subversive elements, thereby not permitting an effective end to the Dirty War".

As an offshoot of the Silvia Quintela case, former dictator Jorge Videla was detained under house-arrest in 2010 on multiple charges of kidnapping children. In July 2012 he was convicted and sentenced to fifty years in prison for the systematic stealing of babies.

On 14 September 2011 the Grandmothers of Plaza de Mayo received the Félix Houphouët-Boigny Peace Prize in Paris for their work in defense of Human Rights.

== The Dirty War and methodology ==
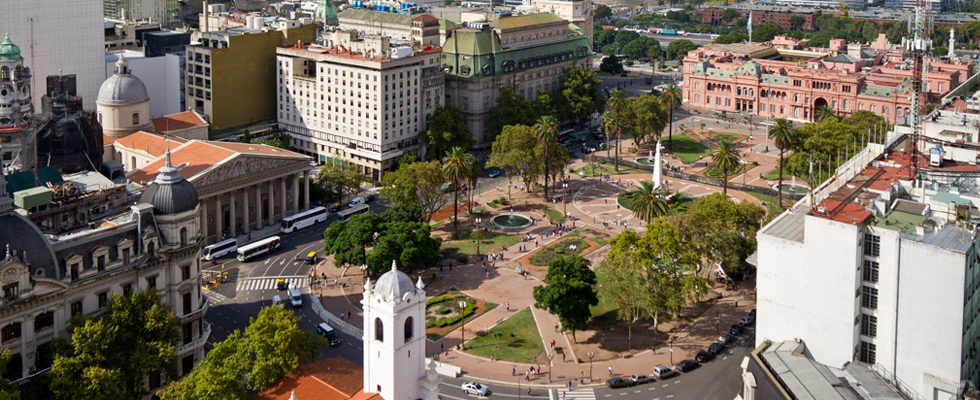
The Plaza De Mayo in Buenos Aires, where the grandmothers have consistently protested since 1977

The war began in 1976 under the government of Lieutenant General Jorge Rafaél Videla. It was a period of state-sponsored violent purges directed towards everyone deemed to be a leftist supporter. Part of Videla's campaign aimed to deter the possibility of a new generation growing up subversive. Although men and women were abducted, children were of higher value and importance in shaping the future of Argentina. There was a waiting list of military families who wanted to adopt the trafficked children. These families specified ideal physical characteristics such as sex, hair and eye color. The children who were not chosen by new families were placed in orphanages and adopted later in their lives. It was not until almost a decade later that general elections resumed and democracy was restored to the country with the election of democrat and leader of the Radical Civic Union Raúl Alfonsín .

The Dirty War is considered an infamous period of time in Latin America for the disappearance of almost 30,000 people. No one demographic of people were abducted. Any person suspected as a threat to the dictatorship would be taken; this includes men and women, young and old, pregnant women, students, middle class workers, lawyers, scientists etc. The military tactics such as Operation Condor and a "night and fog" regime allowed the Argentine government along with other countries surrounding it to deny its actions. While hundreds of people were taken and placed into detention centers that were widely scattered across South America, the government could say that it had never heard of such allegations. With these tactics, the government was able to carry out mass executions. Victims were also thrown from airplanes into the sea, died in captivity or were killed by other torture methods.

== First results ==
By December 1977, just eight months after the formation of Grandmothers of Plaza de Mayo, Azucena Villaflor, who was one of the groups founders was kidnapped and murdered. She had been dumped in a mass grave, after this, several of the other founders faced the same fate. This did not put a stop to the women. During the 1978 World Cup, hosted by Argentina at the time, they made their cause seen and heard by using the international coverage. Despite the state threats, they continued to protest and gather for their first "March of Resistance," in 1981. This protest lasted 24 hours and became annual. This activism helped to turn the country against the regime and spread awareness on a policy meant to silence the voices of women.

The geneticist Mary-Claire King began working with the Grandmothers of the Plaza de Mayo in 1984. On top of developing dental genetics to find the missing people in Argentina, King and her team developed a technique that uses mitochondrial DNA. Mitochondrial DNA is only inherited from mothers, and it different from other DNA in humans. With this technique, they were able to reunite one of the founders, Estelle de Carlotto and her grandson. King has worked with the Grandmothers of Plaza de Mayo for three decades and is continuing to look for the missing children.

== The legacy of the war ==
Following the military dictatorship, psychologists and other mental health workers have determined that the damages of the war have had long-term effects on three generations of Argentines: the first category being the parents of those who had disappeared under Operation Condor, the second being the children of those who disappeared, and the last of course being the disappeared themselves. Each generation suffering from some sort of long-term psychological harm due to living through a time that legitimized crime. Studies have also noticed that there is conflict in human rights to privacy.

The purpose of the grandmothers forming their organization was to find those who went missing during the war as well as provide rehabilitation to those they are able to identify, a cause that is still being fulfilled. However, even today there is a conflict with that aim because on one hand, the grandmothers deserve to know what happened to their loved ones. On the other hand, the children sometimes refuse identification methods such as DNA testing and refuse to reunite with their biological family. The refusal has both been voluntary and involuntary; voluntary if the children truly do not want to reunite with their biological family, involuntary if the children have been threatened or intimidated out of reuniting, most likely by the government or other military personnel who had adopted the children at the time of the kidnappings. Many of the children who were abducted decline the option to meet their biological family because they believe that they are not their true relatives due to the fact that the children were deprived of being raised by their biological parents. Meeting with relatives such as the grandmothers of Plaza de Mayo may open up dark memories that the children cannot handle. Whatever the circumstance of the child, the organization still believes in providing the abducted the opportunity to learn more about themselves and their family history no matter how tragic it is, which is why the grandmothers have continued their movement, periodically protesting to gain more followers. They make sure to continue to protest at the plaza to remind the people of Argentina that their work is not finished.

== Collapse of the dictatorship ==
The Falklands War played a large role in the collapse of the regime. Argentina's military, led by Lieutenant General Leopoldo Galtieri, was under domestic pressure due to economic mismanagement and human rights abuses. To try and unify the country, the government launched an invasion of the Falkland Islands. The military's defeat on June 14th, 1982, discredited the regime and exposed the government's failure. After this, Galtieri resigned as president and commander in chief. Galtieri's successor, General Reynaldo Bignone, oversaw a period in which political parties were now allowed to resume activities and general elections. In 1983 Raúl Alfonsín was elected, restoring democratic rule in Argentina.

== Formation ==
In March 1976, the Argentine military carried out a coup and took control of the government. The military junta then established a violent dictatorship that lasted for several years. During this time, around 30,000 people, many between the ages of 16 and 35, disappeared after being taken to secret detention centers. Others who opposed the regime were kidnapped, tortured, and killed. In April 1977, the first protest took place in the Plaza de Mayo in Buenos Aires. The group, later known as the mothers of the Plaza de Mayo, was dedicated to finding their missing relatives and returning children who has been taken from their families.

Initially they were known as Argentine Grandmothers with Disappeared Little Grandchildren (Abuelas Argentinas con Nietitos Desaparecidos), but later adopted the name The Grandmothers of Plaza de Mayo (Las Abuelas de Plaza de Mayo). In 1983 the constitutional government was re-established and the grandmothers searched for missing children using anonymous tips and conducted their own investigations, but were unable to prove the children's identities. Geneticists from the United States worked with the Grandmothers and were able to store blood samples from family members in the National Genetic Data Bank until the grandchildren could be located and could confirm the relatedness with an accuracy rate of 99.99%. The Grandmothers fought through the court systems to annul the unlawful adoptions. By the mid 1990s legal battles of custody were no longer appropriate because the missing grandchildren were now legal adults. The grandmothers adapted their strategy and started public awareness campaigns to direct the missing grandchildren to contact the organization. As of 2008, their efforts had resulted in finding 97 grandchildren.

== Work with Identity Archive ==
In 2000, the Grandmothers of Plaza de Mayo partnered with the Identity Archive to provide collections of photos, films, audiotapes, diaries, significant objects, and personal stories from families whose children and grandchildren had disappeared. This was done because some of the grandparents were aging and dying without finding their grandchildren and the Grandmothers of Plaza de Mayo wanted to provide these accounts if children were found in the future.

== Public awareness campaigns ==
In the mid to late 1990s, the missing grandchildren that the Grandmothers of Plaza de Mayo sought became legal adults. The Grandmothers then turned to public awareness campaigns to achieve their goals. The difference between Argentina's case and other child trafficking cases is that the disappeared children likely did not know that they were adopted. The organization turned to a commercial campaign and joined with actors to appeal to younger audiences. Their goal was to use popular culture to create doubt within the minds of a group of people who would have never questioned their family.

Besides the public protests at the time of the trafficking, the grandmothers have continued to put their efforts into locating more people to this day. Today, the women are known for providing other services such as legal counseling, assistance in investigations, as well as certain forms of psychological support for other women and their families. With these resources, families are able to receive comfort and rehabilitation. The women of the organization also provide training and seminars to teach new volunteers how to assist in rehabilitation services as well as learn more on human rights work.

== Notable members ==
- Alicia Zubasnabar de De la Cuadra – first president of the Grandmothers of Plaza de Mayo
- Estela de Carlotto – Current president of the Grandmothers of Plaza de Mayo
- Rosa Tarlovsky de Roisinblit
- Nélida Gómez de Navajas
- María Isabel Chorobik de Mariani
- Elsa Sánchez de Oesterheld

Originally 13 grandmothers gathered to form the organization, including Mirta Acuña de Baravalle.

== See also ==
- Dirty War
- Mothers of Plaza de Mayo
- National Reorganization Process
- Lost children of Francoism
- Child abductions in the Russo-Ukrainian War
