= Memory, Truth and Justice Processes (Argentina) =

Memory, Truth and Justice processes (Spanish: Procesos de Memoria, Verdad y Justicia) is the name with which the processes that culminate in trials for crimes against humanity carried out against those responsible for human rights violations committed in the context of state terrorism during the last civil-ecclesiastical-military dictatorship in Argentina between 1976 and 1983 are referred to. These include the actions of Human Rights organizations, such as Mothers of the Plaza de Mayo, Grandmothers of the Plaza de Mayo or HIJOS, as well as different public policies such as the creation of CONADEP, the creation of reparation laws, the restitution of appropriated children, the Trials for the Truth, the marking of Sites of Memory in Argentina in the areas where clandestine detention centers operated and the creation of Spaces of Memory.

These processes, which seek to uncover the truth about historical events, aim to combat impunity for Argentine repressors and genocide perpetrators. These processes of consolidation of democracy have made Argentina an international benchmark in the field of human rights.

== CONADEP ==
The National Commission on the Disappearance of Persons (CONADEP, Comisión Nacional sobre la Desaparición de Personas) was an advisory commission created by President Raúl Alfonsín on December 15, 1983, to investigate the serious, repeated and planned human rights violations committed during the military dictatorship. The commission traveled throughout the country in search of testimonies of survivors, relatives, repressors and buildings used as detention centers; they made an inventory of all reported disappearances and all clandestine centers; they made maps, classified the accounts and made an analysis to reconstruct the mode of operation of State Terrorism. The commission produced a final report, called Never again, which recorded the existence of 8,961 disappeared persons and 380 clandestine detention centers.

== Trial of the Military Juntas ==
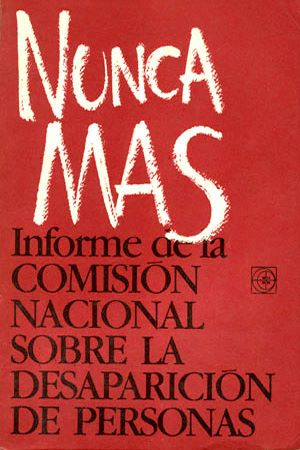

In 1984, the Federal Chamber displaced the military court in view of the evidence of the military justice system's unjustified delay in prosecuting the military juntas, and took over the case directly. The trial was of great international importance, especially for the region, where in neighboring countries such as Chile, Uruguay and Brazil, which suffered similar crimes, it was impossible to bring the repressors to justice and their criminals were never convicted. Between April 22 and August 14, 1985, the trial was held in which 833 people testified, including former disappeared detainees, families of the victims and security forces personnel. The trial demonstrated the responsibility of the junta leaders and the falsity of any hypothesis about "excesses typical of any military action" as the commanders claimed.

=== Sentences ===
- Jorge Rafael Videla was sentenced to life imprisonment and perpetual absolute disqualification with the accessory of dismissal as perpetrator of the crimes of aggravated homicide by aggravated by malice aforethought in 16 cases, aggravated homicide by aggravating circumstances and by the concurrence of several persons in 50 cases, illegal deprivation of liberty aggravated by threats and violence in 306 cases, torment in 93 cases, torment followed by death in 4 cases, robbery in 26 cases, and was acquitted for lack of evidence for aggravated homicide in 19 cases, aggravated unlawful deprivation of liberty in 94 cases, robbery in 26 cases, and torment in 164 cases, for torment followed by death in 4 cases, for robbery in 26 cases and was acquitted for lack of evidence for aggravated homicide in 19 cases, aggravated unlawful deprivation of liberty in 94 cases, torment in 164 cases, robbery in 64 cases, child abduction in 6 cases, reduction to servitude in 23 cases, usurpation in 5 cases, kidnapping for extortion in 3 cases, for ideological falsehood in 120 cases and for suppression of public documents.
- Emilio Eduardo Massera was sentenced to life imprisonment and perpetual absolute disqualification with the accessory of dismissal as perpetrator of the crimes of aggravated homicide by aggravated by malice aforethought in 3 cases, illegal deprivation of liberty aggravated by violence and threats in 69 cases, repeated torture in 12 cases and robbery in 7 cases, and was acquitted for lack of evidence for aggravated homicide in 83 cases, for qualified illegal deprivation of freedom in 440 cases, for repeated torment in 260 cases, for robbery in 99 cases, for torment followed by death in 5 cases, for child abduction on 6 occasions, for suppression of public documents, for reduction to servitude in 23 cases, for usurpation in 5 cases, for kidnapping for extortion, for extortion in 2 cases and for ideological falsehood in 127 cases.
- Roberto Eduardo Viola was sentenced to 17 years of imprisonmentand to perpetual absolute disqualification with the accessory of dismissal.
- Armando Lambruschini was sentenced to 8 years of imprisonment and to perpetual absolute disqualification with the accessory of dismissal.
- Orlando Ramón Agosti was sentenced to 4 years and 6 months of imprisonment and to perpetual absolute disqualification with the accessory of dismissal.
- Omar Domingo Rubens Graffigna and Arturo Basilio Lami Dozo were acquitted because they assumed command after the only detention center in their force was closed. Leopoldo Fortunato Galtieri and Jorge Isaac Anaya were acquitted because it could not be demonstrated that the personnel under their charge continued to commit any of the crimes of the illegal system of repression implemented when they assumed power.

== Full Stop Law and Due Obedience Law ==
After the military Trial of the Juntas and the "carapintadas" uprisings, two laws were passed (Full stop law and Law of Due Obedience) that virtually halted the cases for crimes committed during the dictatorship. Law 23,492, known as "Full stop law", was enacted in 1986 by President Raúl Alfonsín, and established the suspension of judicial proceedings against those accused as criminally responsible for having committed crimes against humanity. Law 23,521 "Due Obedience" was enacted by the President and established a presumption iuris et de iure (without admitting proof to the contrary) that crimes committed by members of the Armed Forces during the State Terrorism were not punishable, since they acted under the so-called "due obedience". These legal norm were issued after the "carapintadas" uprisings, at the initiative of the Alfonsín government, in an attempt to contain the discontent of the officers of the Argentine Army, exempting military personnel below the rank of colonel from responsibility for crimes committed following the military hierarchical chain. As a result, most of the defendants in criminal cases related to State terrorism were dismissed. The only trials that were carried out were for the systematic theft of newborns, and with cases not directly linked to crimes against humanity (illicit association, falsification of public documents, etc.).

== Presidential pardons ==
In 1989 and 1990, Carlos Menem signed a series of decrees pardoning civilians and military personnel convicted of crimes during the military dictatorship, which resulted in the release of more than 1,200 people. Among those pardoned were all the indicted military chiefs who had not benefited from the Full Stop and Due Obedience laws, Leopoldo Galtieri, Jorge Isaac Anaya, Basilio Lami Dozo, Jorge Rafael Videla, Emilio Massera, Orlando Ramón Agosti, Roberto Viola, Armando Lambruschini, Ramón Camps, Ovidio Riccheri, Norma Kennedy, Duilio Brunello, José Alfredo Martínez de Hoz and Guillermo Suárez Mason.

== Escraches ==
In April 1995, a new organization called HIJOS (Hijos e Hijas por la Identidad y la Justicia contra el Olvido y el Silencio) emerged, whose acronym expresses the basic guidelines of the organization: Sons and Daughters for Identity and Justice against Oblivion and Silence, which was originally composed of children of detainees, the disappeared and ex-convicts. In the context of the total absence of any possibility of investigation and legal condemnation for those responsible for the disappearances, kidnappings, torture and deaths of thousands of people, this organization built a new and different tool, also oriented towards condemnation, but anchored in the social and political spheres.

== Trials for the Truth ==
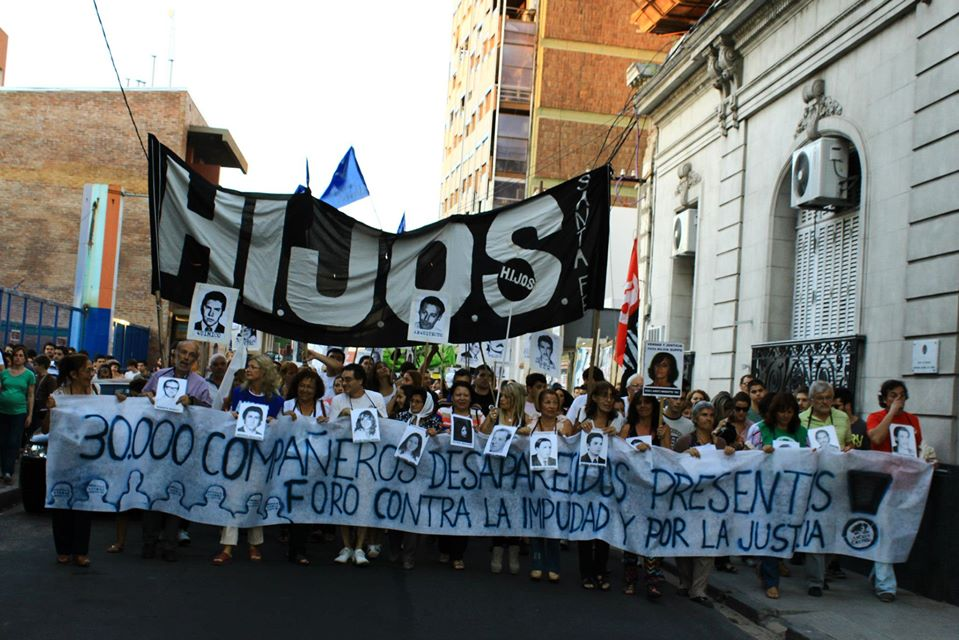
Mobilization for the Day of Memory for Truth and Justice 2013 in Santa Fe.

In 1998, one of the founders of the Grandmothers of the Plaza de Mayo, Carmen Aguiar de Lapacó, appeared before the Inter-American Commission on Human Rights (IACHR) and alleged that the Argentine State violated the right to truth and the right to justice, because the laws of impunity and the presidential pardon could not be invoked to prevent the determination of what happened to Alejandra Lapacó and the final destination of her body, since the crime of forced disappearance continued to be executed until the victim was found. In 1999, a Friendly Settlement Agreement was signed between the parties in which the Argentine State undertook to guarantee an investigation into the truth of the facts denounced in the criminal justice system, although without the possibility of charges or sentences. It also assigned exclusive jurisdiction to the National Federal Criminal and Correctional Courts throughout the country to hear all cases involving the investigation of the truth about the fate of persons who disappeared prior to December 10, 1983, with the exception of cases involving the kidnapping of minors, since they were outside the legal impediments enshrined in the laws and pardons.

As from the Agreement, criminal investigations were reopened in all provinces without the possibility of indictment and sentences. At this judicial stage, the cases under investigation were called "Trials for Historical Truth". In it, the people pointed out as responsible were summoned as witnesses since they could not be prosecuted and convicted; and they had to comply with the obligation to tell the truth about everything they knew under penalty of committing the crime of false testimony. In this context, those who refused to testify were subjected to several days of arrest by the judges.

== Annulment of laws and pardons ==
In 2003, these laws were declared null and void by the National Congress of Argentina and when they were declared unconstitutional by the Supreme Court of Justice in 2005, many of these individuals were re-prosecuted.

From that moment on, new trials for crimes against humanity began to be held against those responsible for the human rights violations that were a consequence of the state terrorism that occurred during the National Reorganization Process.

These processes are not only related to the repeal of the so-called impunity laws and the reopening of trials against those responsible for State terrorism, but also to the recovery of appropriated children and the emergence of reparation laws and State policies with respect to spaces of memory.

As part of these policies 106 places that had been clandestine detention centers were marked by the state and turned into spaces for memory. Among others, the Haroldo Conti Cultural Memory Center and the Memory and Human Rights Space have been created.

== See also ==
- Day of Remembrance for Truth and Justice
- Montoneros
- People's Revolutionary Army (Argentina)
