= Impunity laws =

The term "impunity laws" (Spanish: Leyes de impunidad) refers to two laws and a series of presidential decrees enacted between 1986 and 1990, which prevented the prosecution or execution of convictions against perpetrators of crimes against humanity during the state terrorism carried out by the Military Junta in the 1976 civil-military coup d'état, which governed from 1976 to 1983. On May 3, 2017, the Supreme Court issued a ruling that allows the sentences of persons found guilty of crimes against humanity to be significantly reduced, by application of the so-called "two for one".

== Background ==
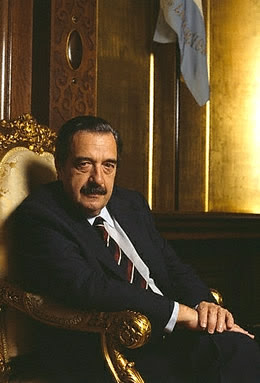
Raúl Alfonsín in 1983 ordered the Trial of the Juntas. In 1986 and 1987 he enacted the laws of Full Stop and Due Obedience, establishing impunity for a large number of criminals against humanity.

The 1976 coup d'état –called "Aries Operation" by its perpetrators– was the civil-military rebellion that deposed the Argentine Nation President, María Estela Martínez de Perón, on March 24, 1976. In its place, a Military Government Junta was established, led by Lieutenant General Jorge Rafael Videla, Admiral Emilio Eduardo Massera and Brigadier General Orlando Ramón Agosti. The new government took the official name of Proceso de Reorganización Nacional (National Reorganization Process) and remained in power until December 1983. During this period, numerous human rights violations were committed and were officially recorded for the first time in 1984, after the return to democracy, in the report Never Again by the National Commission on the Disappearance of Persons (CONADEP).

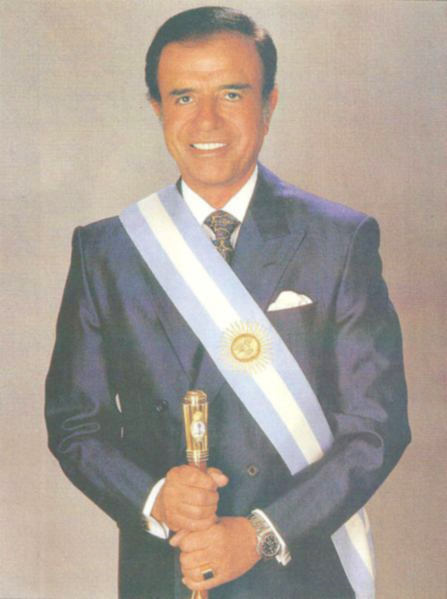
In 1989 and 1990, President Carlos Menem pardoned the perpetrators of crimes against humanity.

Before returning to democratic power, Reynaldo Bignone sanctioned Law 22,924, "National Pacification Law", in which the members of the military juntas were exonerated of guilt and charges for the crimes carried out in that process.

In 1983, President Raúl Alfonsín ordered the prosecution of three of the four military juntas that led the military dictatorship, in a process known as the Trial of the Juntas, which ended in 1985 with the conviction of several military leaders, in a case with few precedents in world history, mainly against other military, police and civilians involved in the proven crimes against humanity. However, in 1986, President Alfonsín, under pressure from the armed forces, promoted the enactment of the so-called "Full Stop" and "Due Obedience" laws, which prevented the prosecution of most of the criminals. Beginning in 1989, President Carlos Menem issued a series of amnesty decrees freeing criminals not covered by the aforementioned laws, including convicted junta members and Economy Minister José Alfredo Martínez de Hoz. Together, these laws have become known as the impunity laws.

== Impunity Laws ==
=== Self-Amnesty Law 22,924 "National pacification law" ===
Law 22,924, the National Pacification Law, enacted on September 22, 1983, became known as the Self-Amnesty Law because through it, the leaders of the military dictatorship that called itself the National Reorganization Process, faced with the possibility of being prosecuted by the government that would result from lifting the political ban and calling elections, sought to issue an amnesty for themselves.

Article No. 1 of the law stated as follows:

ART. 1 —The criminal actions arising from crimes committed with terrorist or subversive motivation or purpose, from May 25, 1973 to June 17, 1982, are hereby declared extinguished. The benefits granted by this law are also extended to all criminal acts carried out on the occasion of or in connection with the development of actions aimed at preventing, deterring or putting an end to the aforementioned terrorist or subversive activities, whatever their nature or the legal interest harmed. The effects of this law reach the perpetrators, participants, instigators, accomplices or accessories, and include related common crimes and related military crimes.

Article No. 5 of the law stated as follows:

ART. 5º —No one may be interrogated, investigated, summoned to appear or required to appear in any way due to allegations or suspicions of having committed crimes or participated in the actions referred to in Article 1 of this law, or for presuming knowledge of them, their circumstances, their perpetrators, participants, instigators, accomplices or accessories.

Article No. 12 of the law stated as follows:

ART. 12º —The Ordinary, Federal or Military Judges or military agencies before which complaints or lawsuits based on the imputation of the crimes and facts included in Article 1 are filed, shall reject them without any substantiation whatsoever.

The presidential candidate of the Justicialist Party in the October 1983 elections, Ítalo Argentino Lúder, declared the validity of the law, while the candidate of the Radical Civic Union, Raúl Alfonsín, denounced during his campaign the existence of a union-military pact and pledged to repeal it. Shortly after taking office as president, Raúl Alfonsín sent to Congress a bill to repeal the law, which was approved with Law No. 23,040 a week later. This repeal was the first law passed by the Argentine Congress after the restitution of democracy in 1983.

After the repeal of the National Pacification Law, Raúl Alfonsín's Ministry of Defense officially communicated to the Supreme Council of the Armed Forces the decree for the prosecution of the members of the first three military juntas. The repeal of this law made it possible to carry out the Trial of the Juntas, which judgment Jorge Rafael Videla and Emilio Eduardo Massera to life imprisonment, Roberto Eduardo Viola to 17 years in prison, Armando Lambruschini to 8 years in prison and Orlando Ramón Agosti to 4 years in prison.

=== Law 23,492 "Full Stop Law" ===
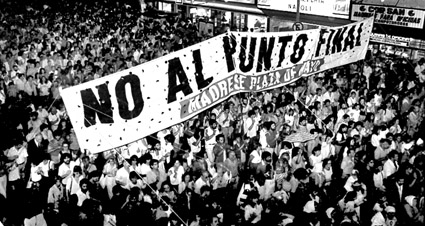
Political demonstration against the Full Stop Law in 1986.

Law 23,492 of Full Stop is an Argentines law that established the expiration of the criminal action (statute of limitations) against those accused as criminally responsible for having committed the complex crime of forced disappearance of persons (which involved illegal detentions, torture and aggravated homicides or murders) that took place during the military dictatorship of the self-styled National Reorganization Process of 1976–1983 that had not been called to testify "before sixty days from the date of enactment of this law". It was presented by Congressmen Juan Carlos Pugliese, Carlos A. Bravo and Antonio J. Macris, and enacted on December 24, 1986, by President Raúl Alfonsín Congress declared it null and void in 2003. During the 1983 election campaign, the Radical Civic Union candidate Raúl Alfonsín had promised that there would be no impunity for the crimes of state terrorism.

On December 5, 1986, then President Raúl Alfonsín announced a bill that abruptly stopped the filing of complaints of human rights violations during the dictatorship. It set a term of thirty days, after which the right to claim justice expired. The bill was baptized as the Full Stop Law.

The law established that "criminal action shall be extinguished against any person who had committed delict related to the establishment of violent forms of political action up to October 10, 1983". Since it sanctioned the impunity of the military criminally responsible for having committed the crime of forced disappearance of several thousand opponents, leftist activists, intellectuals, peronists, trade unionists, writers and other groups during the dictatorship. It was at the time the subject of a lively and heated controversy. Between 50,000 and 60,000 people demonstrated in downtown Buenos Aires in protest against the law, among them communists and peronists. According to El País, the Spanish newspaper, it was the largest demonstration in the federal capital since democracy had been restored three years earlier.

Convened by the Mothers of the Plaza de Mayo and Grandmothers of the Plaza de Mayo, human rights organizations and extra-parliamentary leftist parties, the march was supported by revolutionary Peronists and the General Confederation of Labor (Confederación General del Trabajo. CGT). Only cases of kidnapping of newborns, children of political prisoners destined to disappear, who were generally adopted by the military, who concealed their true biological identity, were outside the scope of the law. The Full Stop Law was enacted on December 24, 1986, by then President Raúl Alfonsín, and established the suspension of judicial proceedings against those accused of being criminally responsible for having committed the crime of forced disappearance of persons during the dictatorship. Months later it was complemented by the Due Obedience Law (23,521) also enacted by Alfonsín on June 4, 1987, and established a presumption iuris et de iure (i.e., which did not admit any legal proof to the contrary) that crimes committed by members of the Armed Forces were not punishable.

Its first practical application occurred two days later when the Attorney General's Office, headed by the radical Juan Octavio Gauna, accepted that the law was applicable to a group of officers who acted under the orders of General Ramón Camps in the province of Buenos Aires, annulling his conviction.

The laws of Full Stop and Due Obedience, together with the pardons granted by Carlos Menem (1989-1990), are known as impunity laws.

=== Due Obedience Law ===
The Due Obedience Law No. 23,521 was a legal provision enacted in Argentina on June 4, 1987, during the government of Raúl Alfonsín, which established a presumption (that is, it did not admit proof to the contrary, although it did allow an appeal to the Supreme Court regarding the scope of the law) that crimes committed by members of the Armed Forces below the rank of colonel (as long as they had not appropriated minors and/or property of disappeared persons), during the State terrorism and the military dictatorship were not Punishment, since they acted under the so-called "due obedience" (a military concept according to which subordinates are limited to obeying orders issued by their superiors).

Although some interpreted that legal norm had been approved by the Alfonsín government after the "carapintadas" uprisings, to try to contain the dissatisfaction of the officers of the Argentine Army, which had been previously announced during the riots of March 1987 by Alfonsín himself in a public speech in the town of Las Perdices, Córdoba and already during the 1983 campaign in which Alfonsín insisted on the need to recognize that the Armed Forces were based on the rule of "due obedience" and that there were "three levels of responsibility"; on the other hand, the trials for state terrorism continued throughout Alfonsín's government.

In this way, those accused in criminal cases of the so-called State terrorism who had not been convicted up to that time, were dismissed from prosecution. The laws of Full Stop (1986) and Due obedience (1987), together with the people pardoned by Carlos Menem (1989–1990), are known among their detractors as the impunity laws.

Some of the beneficiaries of the legal norm were former frigate captain Alfredo Ignacio Astiz, frigate captain Adolfo Donda, and general Antonio Domingo Bussi.

=== Pardons ===
A series of ten decrees were sanctioned on October 7, 1989, and December 30, 1990, by the then President of Argentina Carlos Menem, pardon civilians and military personnel who committed crimes during the dictatorship self-styled National Reorganization Process, including the members of the juntas convicted in the 1985 Trial of the Juntas, the prosecuted Minister of Economy José Alfredo Martínez de Hoz and the leaders of the guerrilla organizations. More than 1,200 people were pardoned through these decrees.

==== The 1989 pardons ====
On October 7, 1989, President Menem issued four decrees pardoning 220 military personnel and 70 civilians.

- Decree 1002/89: It pardons all the military chiefs prosecuted who had not been benefited by the laws of Full Stop and Due Obedience, except for Major General Guillermo Suárez Mason, who had been extradited from the United States.
- Decree 1003/89: Pardons leaders and members of guerrilla groups and other persons accused of subversion, among them persons who were dead or "disappeared". It also pardons Uruguayan military personnel.
- Decree 1004/89: Pardons all participants in the military rebellions of the carapintadas of Semana Santa and Monte Caseros in 1987 and of Villa Martelli in 1988.
- Decree 1005/89: Pardons former members of the Junta de Comandantes Leopoldo Galtieri, Jorge Isaac Anaya and Basilio Lami Dozo, convicted for crimes committed in the conduct of the Falklands War.

==== The 1990 pardons ====
On December 29, 1990, President Menem issued six decrees pardoning a new group of people.

- Decree 2741/90: Pardons the former members of the juntas of commanders condemned in the 1985 Trial of the Juntas Jorge Rafael Videla, Emilio Massera, Orlando Ramón Agosti, Roberto Viola, and Armando Lambruschini. It also pardons the military officers convicted of crimes against humanity Ramón Camps and Ovidio Riccheri.
- Decree 2742/90: Pardons Mario Eduardo Firmenich, leader of the Montoneros guerrilla organization.
- Decree 2743/90: Pardons Norma Kennedy, prosecuted for embezzlement of public funds.
- Decree 2744/90: Pardons Duilio Brunello, sentenced to absolute and perpetual disqualification for the crime of embezzlement of public funds.
- Decree 2745/90: Pardons former Minister of Economy José Alfredo Martínez de Hoz prosecuted for participation in crimes against humanity (kidnapping and torture) against Federico and Miguel Ernesto Guthein.
- Decree 2746/90: Pardons former military officer Guillermo Suárez Mason for crimes against humanity.

== Subsequent reactions ==
In 1998 the National Congress repealed the laws of Full Stop and Due Obedience, and in 2003 proceeded to annul them. This annulment was validated by the Supreme Court of Justice, which declared them unconstitutional on June 14, 2005.

In 2003, the Chamber of Deputies approved the nullity of the Due Obedience and Full Stop, the deputies of the Justicialist party and those of the center-left and left-wing parties voted for the nullity of the law. The legislators of the right-wing parties voted against, with the deputy of the Republican Force Ricardo Bussi at the head, accompanied by Union of the Democratic Centre, followers of Cavallo and followers of Ricardo López Murphy. Meanwhile, Radicalism, a former promoter of the Full Stop law, decided to abstain. With the approval of the constitutional rank for the UN Convention on the imprescriptibility of war crimes and crimes against humanity, ratified by then President Néstor Kirchner the day before. Meanwhile, in the Senate, the nullity, pushed by the Justicialist Party bloc and resisted by the Radical Civic Union, meant for the senators a clear alignment with President Néstor Kirchner, who was seeking this result to enable the trial of military personnel in Argentina and not abroad. Minutes before 2:00 am, the Chamber approved by 43 votes to 7 the nullity of the Due Obedience and Full Stop laws. The majority of the radicals voted against, Luis Falcó, Raúl Baglini and the head of the block Carlos Maestro were among those who made long speeches against repealing the laws.

After Congress declared the nullity of the Full Stop and Due Obedience laws in 2003, some judges began to declare unconstitutional those pardons referring to crimes against humanity and to reopen the cases.

On June 15, 2006, the Criminal Cassation Chamber, Argentina's highest criminal court, held that pardons granted for crimes against humanity were unconstitutional.

On August 31, 2010, the Supreme Court of Justice upheld lower court rulings, ruling that the pardons were not constitutional but that the convictions they overturned should be enforced.

== Application of the two-for-one rule to crimes against humanity ==
On May 3, 2017, the Supreme court issued a ruling admitting that criminals convicted of crimes against humanity may double compute the time they were detained before being convicted, starting from two years of pretrial detention. The sentence was handed down in the case "Bignone, Reynaldo Benito Antonio and others extraordinary appeal" (CSJ 1574/2014/RH1) and benefited Luis Muiña, guilty of five crimes against humanity and sentenced in 2011 to thirteen years in prison, after having been in pretrial detention since 2007. The Court considered Article 7 of Law No. 24,390, known as the Two for One Law, which was in force between 1994 and 2001, applicable to the case. The ruling was issued by three votes in favor (Elena Highton de Nolasco, Carlos Rosenkrantz and Horacio Rosatti) and two votes against (Ricardo Lorenzetti and Juan Carlos Maqueda). The sentence was questioned by human rights organizations and a broad spectrum of national and international organizations and personalities, who considered it an impunity act, associating it with the so-called impunity laws, passed during the governments of Raúl Alfonsín and Carlos Menem, triggering several criminal complaints against its authors and requests for impeachment.

== See also ==
- National Commission on the Disappearance of Persons
- Trial of the Juntas
- National Reorganization Process
- Dirty War
- Theory of the two demons
