= Luis Moreno Ocampo =

Argentine lawyer and first prosecutor of the ICC

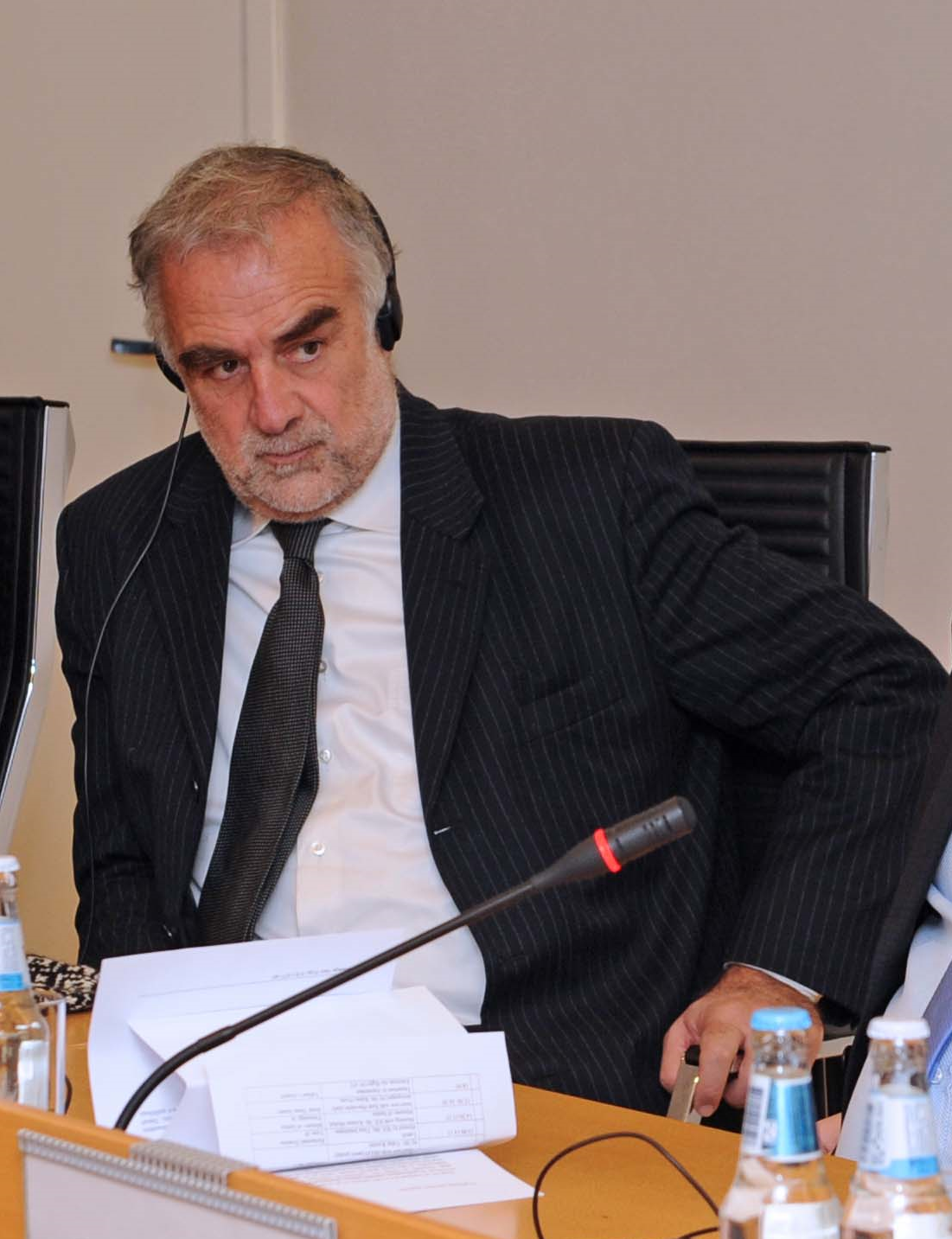

Prosecutor of the International Criminal Court
- In office 16 June 2003 – 15 June 2012
- President: Philippe Kirsch; Song Sang-Hyun
- Deputy: Fatou Bensouda; Serge Brammertz
- Preceded by: Position established
- Succeeded by: Fatou Bensouda

Personal details
- Born: 4 June 1952 (age 74) Buenos Aires, Argentina
- Education: University of Buenos Aires

Luis Moreno Ocampo (Note: Moreno Ocampo's surnames are often hyphenated in English-language media to mark Moreno as a surname, not a given name.) (born 4 June 1952) is an Argentine lawyer who served as the first prosecutor of the International Criminal Court (ICC) from 2003 to 2012. Previously, he had played a major role in Argentina's democratic transition (1983–1991).

== Judicial highlights ==
As the first prosecutor of the International Criminal Court, his mandate was to establish the Office of the Prosecutor and decide where to initiate the first investigations. Under his mandate, the Office analyzed 17 situations around the world and opened investigations in seven different countries. He successfully prosecuted three heads of state, including the president of Sudan, Omar al-Bashir.

At the age of 32, Luis Moreno Ocampo became deputy prosecutor of the Trial of the Juntas, where those most responsible for the National Reorganization Process were tried for human rights violations. He also conducted trials for military negligence of those most responsible for the Malvinas–Falklands War, cases of corruption by senior government officials, and trials for the military rebellions of January 1988 and the last one in December 1990.

Moreno Ocampo has been a visiting professor at Stanford University (2002) and Harvard (2003), Hebrew University and USC, and a senior fellow at Yale University, Harvard University and New York University. He has acted as a consultant to the World Bank, the Inter-American Development Bank and the United Nations. He was a member of the advisory council of Transparency International and a founder of NGO Poder Ciudadano.

Luis Moreno Ocampo received the Legion of Honor of France and was distinguished in 2011 as one of 100 Global Thinkers by the publication Foreign Policy. In the same year, The Atlantic included him among its "Brave Thinkers", a guide to people risking their reputations, fortunes and lives in pursuit of big ideas.

== Career in Argentina ==
Born in Buenos Aires, Moreno Ocampo graduated from the University of Buenos Aires Faculty of Law in 1978. From 1980 to 1984, he was an assistant secretary and legal secretary advising the General Attorney of Argentina on preparing judgments at the Supreme Court of Justice. In 1985, he was assistant prosecutor in the Trial of the Juntas held before the Federal Chamber of Criminal Appeals to try the heads of the military juntas that governed Argentina during the last military dictatorship in 1976–1982. There the prosecution proved criminal responsibility against the former presidents Jorge Rafael Videla and Roberto Viola, Admirals Emilio Massera and Armando Lambruschini, and Brigadier Orlando Agosti, who were convicted on 9 December 1985.

This was the first proceeding since the Nuremberg trials where senior military commanders were prosecuted for mass killings. Harvard Professor Kathryn Sikkink sees it as central to The Justice Cascade, which analyzes the human rights impact of trials on geopolitics and global justice.

For Moreno Ocampo, the trial of the juntas not only established the individual responsibility of Massera, Videla and the other commanders, but gave a voice and a face to the victims, who could explain what happened to them. It changed those who did not believe in what had happened and ended the coups d'état forever.

In 1986 he was involved in cases against the Junta's subordinate commanders and officers. One such was against General Ramón Camps, former chief of the Buenos Aires police, and eight other officers accused of murder, kidnapping and torture. He was also part of a team sent to California to request extradition of General Guillermo Suárez Mason, which was done in 1988.

In 1988, he led the prosecution of the leaders of the carapintadas for two attempted coups in 1987 and 1990, and led the prosecution of Leopoldo Galtieri, Jorge Anaya and Basilio Lami Dozo for breach of military duty during the Falklands–Malvinas War. He also led dozens of public corruption cases against federal judges, national ministers and heads of public companies.

In 1992, he left his position in the judicial system and began to work in the private sector from his law firm, conducting investigations into cases of corruption in the private and public sectors and violations of human rights. The firm worked pro bono on public-interest cases such as political bribery, representing the victims in Italyʹs requested extradition of Nazi officer E. Priebke and the daughters of Chilean General Carlos Prats, murdered by Chilean secret police in 1974 in Buenos Aires.

In 1997, he hosted a reality television programme, Fórum, la corte del pueblo, in which he arbitrated private disputes. In his own words, "It was a way of divulging the mechanisms of mediation... bringing to the TV show some of the rules of the judicial system, which are based on respect for the parties, and that they be heard".

== International Criminal Court ==
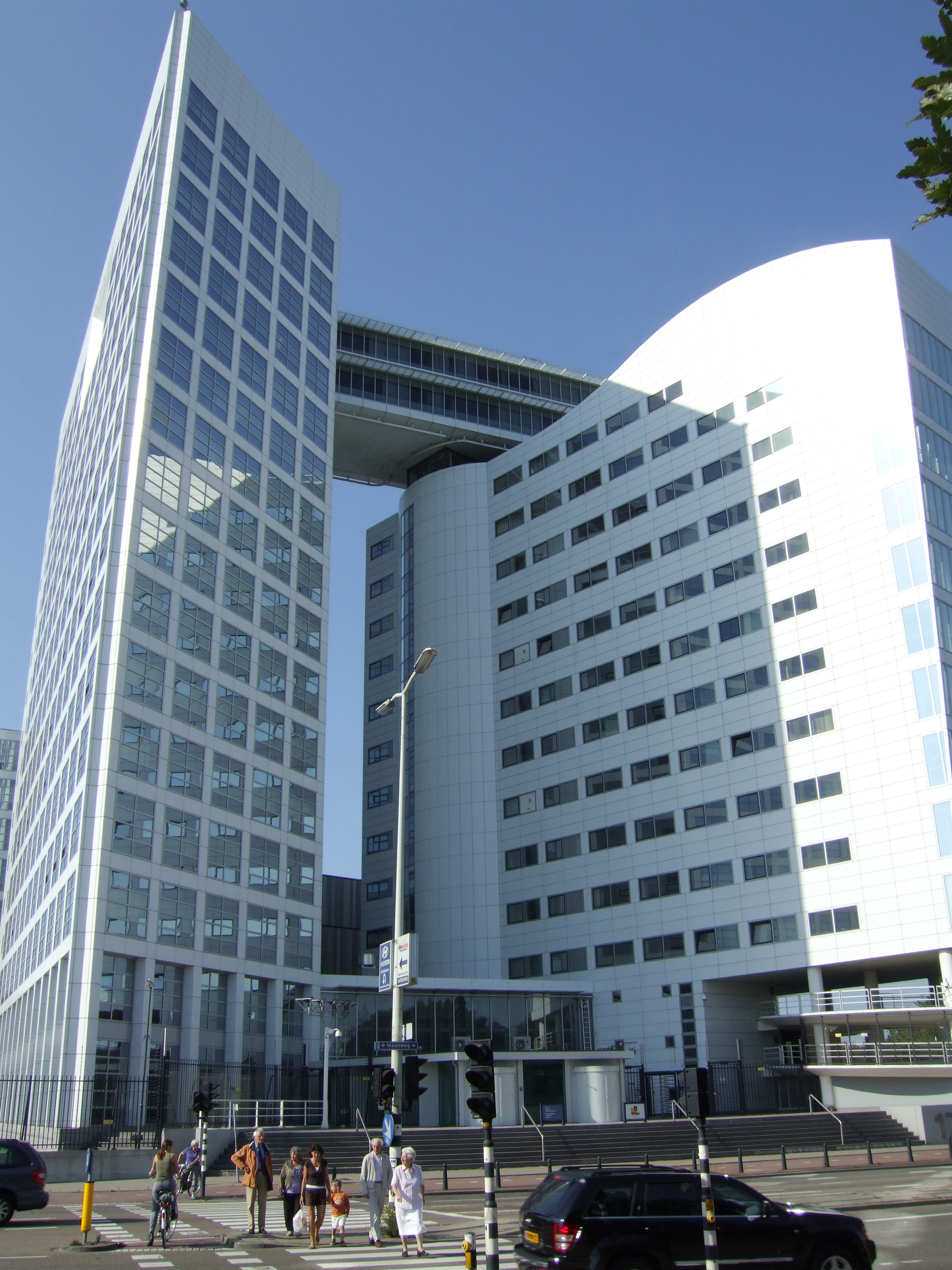
The International Criminal Court's former headquarters in The Hague

On 21 April 2003, Moreno Ocampo was unanimously elected first prosecutor of a new International Criminal Court. On 16 June 2003, as the conflict with Iraq began, he sworn in for a non-renewable nine-year term as Chief Prosecutor of the International Criminal Court. There were fears that the ICC would be unable to function. In its first nine years, the Office of the Prosecutor opened investigations in four states: the Democratic Republic of the Congo, Uganda, the Central African Republic and Kenya – and in Darfur and Libya, at the request of the UN Security Council, and in Ivory Coast at the request of its national authorities.

In his capacity as the prosecutor of the court, Moreno Campo initiated several ICC investigations. Altogether, the ICC has opened investigations in Afghanistan, Bangladesh/Myanmar, Burundi, the Central African Republic (twice), Côte d'Ivoire, Darfur in Sudan, the Democratic Republic of the Congo, Georgia, Kenya, Libya, Lithuania/Belarus, Mali, Palestine, the Philippines, Uganda, Ukraine, and Venezuela I. The Office of the Prosecutor carried out and closed preliminary investigations in Bolivia; Colombia; Congo II; Gabon; Guinea; Honduras; Iraq/the United Kingdom; registered vessels of Comoros, Greece, and Cambodia; South Korea; and Venezuela II. An ongoing preliminary examination is being carried out in the situation in Nigeria.

Moreno Ocampo led an investigation of leaders of the Lord's Resistance Army, who in 2005 faced ICC arrest warrants for crimes against humanity. Moreno Ocampo directed an investigation against Germain Katanga and Matthieu Ngudjolo Chui, who received arrest warrants in 2007 and 2008 for crimes against humanity in the Democratic Republic of Congo. In March 2008, according to an Argentine online news report, Moreno Ocampo claimed that FARC, the largest guerrilla group in Colombia, should face an investigation by the International Criminal Court. He began implementing preliminary tests in Colombia, which involved evaluating prosecutions of paramilitary commanders in Colombia, and interviews with victims of FARC, among others. Moreno-Ocampo claimed that FARC could be investigated for crimes against humanity. He visited Colombia in August, after which the ICC launched an investigation on the "support network for FARC rebels outside Colombia".

During his tenure at the ICC, the first trial ended with the conviction of Thomas Lubanga. Ben Ferencz, who at age 27 participated as prosecutor in the Nuremberg trials, closed the ICC prosecution at the age of 93. On 10 July 2012, Trial Chamber 1 sentenced Lubanga to 14 years in prison, from which six remand years were deducted.

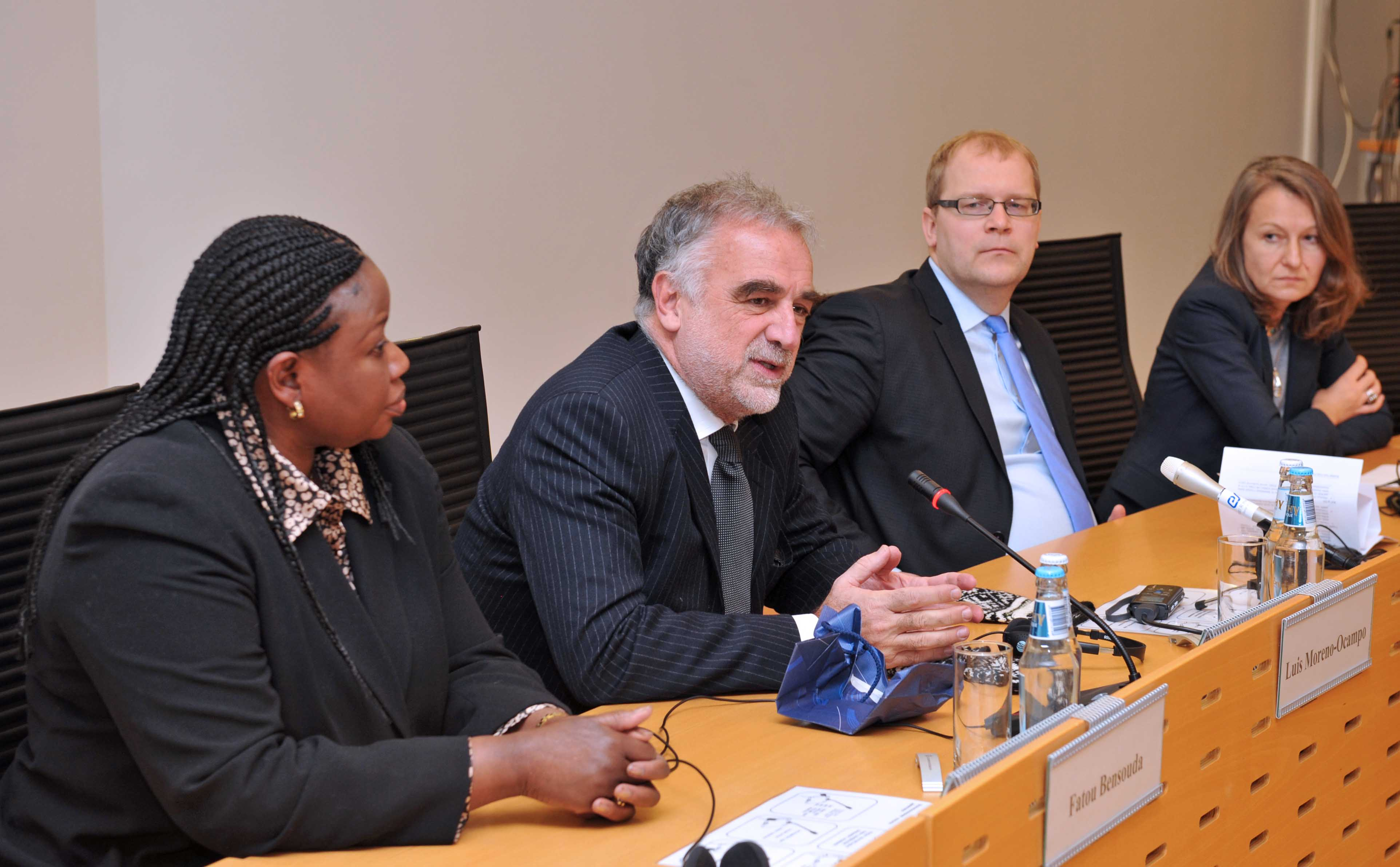
Fatou Bensouda, Luis Moreno-Ocampo, Urmas Paet, and Tiina Intelmann at the International Criminal Court (L–R), February 2012

In July 2008, Moreno Ocampo accused Omar al-Bashir of genocide, crimes against humanity and war crimes in Darfur. That November, he called for arrest warrants against rebels accused of killing members of an international peacekeeping force in Darfur.

The International Criminal Court sent in 2009 and 2010 two international arrest warrants against al-Bashir, who denied all charges. According to the United Nations, in 16 years of conflict from the 2003 uprising of two rebel groups in Darfur, he had caused 300,000 deaths and 2.5 million displacements.

In 2019, Al-Bashir was also sentenced to imprisonment for embezzling up to $9 billion in oil revenues. In 2020, Sudan's ruling generals finally agreed to hand Al-Bashir over to the ICC to face charges of war crimes and crimes against humanity in courts in The Hague.

Moreno Ocampo announced on 15 December 2010 six "prime suspects" – the Ocampo Six – in the Kenya post-election violence of 2007. Named as leading perpetrators where the suspended Minister of Higher Education William Ruto, Minister for Industrialisation Henry Kosgey, Deputy Prime Minister Uhuru Kenyatta, former commissioner of the Kenya Police Major General Mohammed Hussein Ali, head of public services Francis Muthaura, and journalist Joshua Arap Sang.

On 3 March 2011, Moreno Ocampo declared "there will be no impunity in Libya" as he announced an investigation of crimes against humanity committed by either Libyan security forces loyal to leader Muammar Gaddafi or the opposition to the Gaddafi government during the 2011 Libyan civil war. On 16 May 2011, he filed a request to the ICC to issue arrest warrants against Gaddafi, his son Saif al-Islam and Libyan intelligence chief Abdullah Senussi, for crimes against humanity. The Court issued these on 27 June 2011.

On 15 June 2012, Moreno Ocampo finished his term and was replaced by Gambia lawyer Fatou Bensouda.

== After the ICC ==
After his ICC term, Luis Moreno Ocampo joined the New York law firm Getnick and Getnick as global counsel.

From 2013 to 2015, he was a senior fellow at the Jackson Institute for Global Affairs at Yale University. Currently he is a senior fellow at the Carr Center for Human Rights Policy at Harvard University, where he is working on a book about the first nine years of the Rome Statute and its relations with the UN Security Council.

In August 2015, Moreno Ocampo joined forces with Kerry Propper, Taylor Krauss and Elizabeth Schaeffer Brown to help the campaign group Yazda in efforts to bring a case before the ICC against ISIL for crimes of genocide against members of Iraq's Yazidi community. The initiative was part of the campaign It's On U, which sought to persuade heads of state to recognize the genocide, engage key government officials and pressure the UN Security Council to refer the case to the ICC. Moreno Ocampo and the campaign teamed up with Nadia Murad and approached Amal Clooney to help with the case and provide pro-bono legal services to Murad and Yazda.

In July 2017, Moreno Ocampo was appointed special advisor on crimes against humanity by the Organization of American States (OAS), to evaluate human rights violations in Venezuela, meet with interested parties in the conflict and explore the possibility of launching legal proceedings at the ICC against those responsible for the atrocities.

In August 2023, Moreno Ocampo published a report saying that the government of Azerbaijan had committed genocide in its blockade of Armenians in Nagorno-Karabakh. In December 2023, Moreno Ocampo published another report on the crimes of genocide being committed by Azerbaijan, stating that State Parties of the Genocide Convention had failed to prevent genocide, while information on the conditions for genocide were known to them.

In March 2026, Moreno Ocampo stated that the ongoing war on Iran constituted a "crime of aggression" under international law, arguing it violates the global rules-based order designed to protect civilians. In an interview with the BBC, Ocampo argued that threats by U.S. President Donald Trump to destroy Iranian energy and water infrastructure, including desalination plants, along with mutual attacks on energy infrastructure by Iran and Israel, do not constitute legitimate military targets, likening them to the Russian attacks on Ukrainian energy infrastructure that led to ICC indictments.

== Controversies ==
In 2017 the French digital newspaper Mediapart received from unknown sources a copy of all Moreno Ocampo's emails. On that basis, Der Spiegel revealed the existence of accounts and companies offshore belonging to Moreno Ocampo, who did not deny their existence, claiming that he works "offshore", as he does not pay taxes in Argentina because he has not lived there since 2003.

As part of the same investigation, the European journalism network EIC revealed that Moreno Ocampo had Hassan Tatanaki, a Libyan magnate suspected of having supported war criminals in Libya, as a client. It was made clear that Tatanaki was seeking justice in Libya and that he was never suspected of committing crimes by the ICC.

In 2017, the Sunday Times reported that leaked emails from the ICC showed that Moreno Ocampo wanted to enlist the help of movie star Angelina Jolie, and possibly also that of her then-husband Brad Pitt, to lure fugitive Ugandan warlord Joseph Kony to a dinner with her, where he then could be arrested.
