= People pardoned by Carlos Menem =

1989–90 Argentine presidential pardons

The Argentine president Carlos Menem made a series of presidential pardons to people involved in the 1970s Dirty war. The first decrees were signed in 1989, and further ones were signed in 1990. The pardons were eventually revoked in 2003.

== 1989 pardons ==
Decrees signed on October 7, 1989.

- Decree 1002/89: All the prosecuted military leaders who had not been benefited by the full stop or the due obedience laws, with the exception of Guillermo Suárez Mason.
- Decree 1003/89: Leaders and members of subversive guerrillas, and Uruguayan military.
- Decree 1004/89: All the members of the Carapintada mutinies in 1987 and 1988
- Decree 1005/89: The commanders Leopoldo Galtieri, Jorge Isaac Anaya and Basilio Lami Dozo, sentenced for crimes committed during the Falklands War.

== 1990 pardons ==
Decrees signed on December 29, 1990.

- Decree 2741/90: Jorge Rafael Videla, Emilio Massera, Orlando Ramón Agosti, Roberto Viola and Armando Lambruschini, sentenced in the Trial of the Juntas, as well as Ramón Camps and Ovidio Riccheri.
- Decree 2742/90: Mario Eduardo Firmenich, leader of Montoneros.
- Decree 2743/90: Norma Kennedy, charged with corruption.
- Decree 2744/90: Duilio Brunello, charged with corruption.
- Decree 2745/90: Minister José Alfredo Martínez de Hoz.
- Decree 2746/90: Guillermo Suárez Mason.
