= Juicios por la Verdad =

Trials for crimes against humanity in Argentina

- Court: Federal Chambers
- Started: 2000

Keywords
- Crimes against humanity Enforced disappearance

The Juicios por la Verdad (English: Trials for the Truth) are a judicial proceeding without criminal effects that took place in Argentina due to the impossibility of criminally prosecuting those responsible for the crimes against humanity perpetrated during the last civil-military dictatorship (1976–1983), in view of the passing of the Due Obedience and Full Stop laws and the pardons granted to the members of the military juntas. These oral trials were the result of the struggle of human rights organizations that sought alternative strategies to confront impunity through the judicial search for the truth.

These trials took place in different cities of the country: La Plata (1999–2007), Bahía Blanca, Mar del Plata (2001-2002/2004-2008), Córdoba and Mendoza.

== Antecedents ==
As antecedents to the Juicios por la Verdad we recognize, among others, the answers given by the Argentine justice system and by the Inter-American Court of Human Rights to different cases, among which the cases of Emilio Mignone and Carmen Aguiar de Lapacó stand out. In her testimony from the Oral Archive of Memoria Abierta, María José Guembe points out that other types of background must also be considered, for example:

"Scilingo's statement in 1995 and the twenty-year march in 1996 were the two strong shocks. It is not that from one day to the next seven lawyers in Argentina came up with the idea of opening the trials and reopened them. There had been such strong precedents, one was clearly the march of the twenty years, which was massive and also generated a regrouping of different social sectors regarding the issue after many years of silence or apathy".

== Trials ==
=== La Plata ===
In the case of La Plata trial, capital of the Buenos Aires Province, Argentina, the Federal Chamber carried out a proceeding with the aim of finding out what happened to the disappeared people of the province during the last dictatorship and to discover who were responsible for the genocide during that time.

Since September 1998, public hearings related to crimes against humanity have been held every Wednesday at the La Plata Court.

The investigation had more than 2200 files and more than 900 victims have testified. The testimonies of the victims led to criminal proceedings, for example, against repressors and criminals such as the priest Christian von Wernich and the policeman Miguel Etchecolatz, together with other perpetrators of State Terrorism committed in Argentina. In recent years, the trial of the case of the "Comisaría Quinta", an infamous detention center for the disappeared, was also initiated.

=== Mar del Plata ===
The Mar del Plata trials began in February 2001, promoted by human rights organizations and some 60 local institutions. Fourteen cases were presented for investigation, including those of the 1977 Noche de las corbatas.

The trial was conducted between 2001 and 2008 by the Federal Oral Tribunal Number 1, composed of judges Mario Alberto Portela, Roberto Atilio Falcone and Néstor Rubén Parra.

== See also ==
- Permanent Assembly for Human Rights
- Memory, Truth and Justice processes
