= Disappeared detainees of the Dirty War =

Victims of forced disappearances during Argentina's state terrorism (1970s–1980s)

Detenidos desaparecidos por el terrorismo de Estado en Argentina
- Part of State terrorism in Argentina in the 1970s and 1980s
- Date: 1976–1983
- Location: Argentina
- Type: Enforced disappearance
- Cause: Political repression Counterinsurgency
- Perpetrator: National Reorganization Process
- Target: Activists, unionists, guerrillas, artists, journalists, priests, and opponents

The Detenidos Desaparecidos (Disappeared Detainees) of state terrorism in Argentina are victims of forced disappearance before, during, and after the last civic-military dictatorship in Argentina, the National Reorganization Process, from 1976 to 1983. Held in clandestine detention centers, they were subjected to torture and, in many cases, killed. The first disappearances and clandestine detention centers began in 1975 under the constitutional government of Isabel Perón and continued until 1984 during the constitutional government of Raúl Alfonsín.

Declassified U.S. government documents from 2006 reveal that a Chilean intelligence agent reported in a 1978 cable to his superiors that Argentine military personnel from Battalion 601 estimated they had killed or disappeared approximately 22,000 people between 1975 and mid-1978. Around the same time, according to these documents, the then-U.S. ambassador in Buenos Aires, Robert Hill, stated: "It is our estimate that at least several thousand were killed, and we doubt it will ever be possible to establish a more specific figure."

Human rights organizations, unions, and most left-wing political parties traditionally assert that the number of disappearances is approximately 30000. In a 2009 letter, Eduardo Luis Duhalde, then Secretary of Human Rights of Argentina, used this figure, citing variables such as the number of detention and extermination centers, the proportion of habeas corpus petitions filed, and statements from the military themselves. He stated that "the figure of 30000 is neither arbitrary nor capricious, although it is regrettable to reduce the dimension of the Argentine tragedy to an accounting issue," as "the massive, criminal, and abject nature is not measured by arithmetic results, at least for those of us who believe that killing one person is killing humanity."

== Definition ==
The Inter-American Convention on Forced Disappearance of Persons, signed in 1994, classifies forced disappearance as a crime against humanity that is imprescriptible and defines it as follows:

Forced disappearance is considered to be the deprivation of a person's liberty, in whatever form, committed by state agents or by individuals or groups acting with the authorization, support, or acquiescence of the state, followed by a lack of information or a refusal to acknowledge said deprivation of liberty or to provide information on the whereabouts of the person, thereby preventing the exercise of legal remedies and procedural guarantees.

== Context ==
The military governments from 1976 to 1983 pursued political persecution, kidnapping, torture, and murder in a secretive and systematic manner within the framework of state terrorism in Argentina. These practices were also employed in other Latin American dictatorships under Operation Condor in South America and Operation Charly in Central America.

The use of forced disappearance by a totalitarian state seeks impunity by obscuring evidence of the crime, instilling terror in victims and society through uncertainty about the fate of the disappeared, and hindering citizens' ability to act while fostering division. Disappearance renders the opponent a homo sacer, a person who can be killed with impunity.

The practice of disappearance fundamentally relies on producing unknownness. Consequently, uncovering what happened, recovering collective memory, and demanding truth became central demands of victims and human rights organizations. A key slogan chanted during protest marches against the military government was: "The disappeared, tell us where they are!".

Forced disappearance exacerbates the repression and pain, as families struggle to accept the death of loved ones without closure, prolonging the search for their remains and the truth about their fate.

== Background ==
=== Hitler's Night and Fog Decree ===
The system of forced disappearance was first formalized by Nazism through Hitler's Night and Fog Decree of December 7, 1941, reconstructed by the Nuremberg Trials. Nazi ideologues argued that the decree introduced a "fundamental innovation" in state organization: the system of forced disappearances.

The core order of the Night and Fog Decree was:

Acts of resistance by the civilian population in occupied countries shall only be punished by a court-martial when: a) there is certainty that the death penalty will be applied, and b) the sentence is pronounced within eight days of the arrest.

According to Hitler, other opponents were to be detained during "the night and fog" and clandestinely taken to Germany without any further information beyond the fact of their detention.

The decree's rationale explained:

The deterrent effect of these measures... lies in: a) allowing the accused to disappear without a trace, and b) ensuring no information is disseminated about their whereabouts or fate.

The reconstructed text further specified:

Effective and lasting intimidation can only be achieved through death penalties or measures that keep relatives and the population uncertain about the fate of the prisoner. For the same reason, handing over the body for burial in their place of origin is not advisable, as the burial site could be used for demonstrations... Through the dissemination of such terror, all disposition toward resistance among the people will be eliminated.

In Argentina, a truck driver who witnessed the death flights testified that when he asked a military officer about the fate of the bodies he was transporting, the officer replied: "They go to the fog of nowhere."

The Night and Fog Decree is cited as a precedent for Argentina's forced disappearance policy in some judicial rulings. Spanish judge Baltasar Garzón referenced it in a November 2, 1999, ruling ordering the prosecution of 98 Argentine military officers for crimes against humanity:

Just as in the Nazi "Night and Fog" decree, clandestine transfers, the certainty of the abducted that they cannot connect with the outside world, and the symmetrical inability of relatives, politicians, priests, or friends to know what happens in the concentration camps provide the perpetrators with a guarantee of impunity and lack of accountability.

— Resolution of Judge Baltasar Garzón

It was also referenced in a 2006 ruling by the Oral Criminal Court No. 1 of La Plata in the "Etchecolatz" case:

This relates to Hitler's 1941 Night and Fog decrees; the practice of forced disappearance is highly sophisticated from a psychological perspective, surpassing conventional political crime; relatives cannot confirm the death of those they did not see die, there is no registered or formal death, families oscillate between the reality of disappearance and the unreality of death, causing psychological conflicts, these are deaths without graves from an anthropological perspective, families continue to be tortured (psychologically), waiting is not mourning, it does not facilitate it.

— Ruling in the Etchecolatz Case

=== French School ===
Forced disappearance as a repressive method was introduced in Argentina by the so-called "French military school" from the late 1950s. France suffered a catastrophic military defeat in 1954 at the Battle of Dien Bien Phu against the Viet Minh, ending the First Indochina War and paving the way for Vietnam's independence. This defeat against a militarily inferior but popularly supported force shocked the French armed forces, trained in conventional warfare. From this context, French military officers developed the concept of "subversive warfare," later replaced by the "doctrine of revolutionary warfare" (DGR).

Shortly after the Indochina defeat, France faced another independence war led by the Algerian National Liberation Front, which, like in Vietnam, had strong popular support. In this context, French Colonel Charles Lacheroy published La campagne d’Indochine, ou une leçon de guerre révolutionnaire in 1954, outlining tactical and strategic concepts developed over the previous two years. Lacheroy described revolutionary warfare as a "new type of war," "unconventional," where psychological action is critical, and the rearguard becomes more important than the troops. As the enemy is embedded in the population, the fight is less about territory and more about the "hearts" and "minds" of the local population. Lacheroy admitted that such wars require methods "repugnant to human conscience."

The French Army adopted Lacheroy’s ideas and applied them in Algeria when the decolonization war began in November 1954. Torture and forced disappearance were explicitly used as weapons and applied systematically. Death squads were created to kidnap, interrogate under torture, and disappear individuals.

Colonel Marcel Bigeard, head of paratroopers in Algeria, detailed the operation in an interview:

I gave the order: you must act decisively against those who planted bombs, interrogate them harshly, not gouge out their eyes or cut off their ears but apply the cattle prod, electrodes to pass electric current. We called it “the gehgene.”

General Paul Aussaresses further described the modus operandi:

The death squads were non-commissioned officers that Massu placed at my disposal, whose number and names I will never reveal. I roamed all night through the regiments, asking their commanders and intelligence officers what they had done and achieved. When we had a guy who planted a bomb, we pressured him to give all the information. Once he had told everything he knew, we finished him off. He would feel nothing anymore. We made him disappear.

Several authors have noted the connection between Nazi atrocities, Vichy France, the wars to preserve colonialism in Indochina and Algeria, and their persistence in the French far-right.

From May 1958, DGR techniques were taught at Bigeard’s initiative. The courses used Colonel Roger Trinquier’s manual La guerra moderna, which openly justified torture. Held at the Paris War School, they included a month of "practice" in Algeria. The first students were Argentines, including General Alcides López Aufranc, selected by the Argentine General Staff to learn what became known in Argentina as the "French doctrine."

These techniques were transmitted to Argentine military officers at the Superior War School in Argentina and later at the School of the Americas.

=== Western Hemisphere Institute for Security Cooperation ===
The Western Hemisphere Institute for Security Cooperation, established by the United States in July 1963 in the Panama Canal Zone, was a key center for promoting the establishment of totalitarian dictatorships and the use of subversive terrorism, state terrorism, and drug trafficking in Latin America. Over 60,000 military and police personnel from up to 23 Latin American countries were trained there, including ideological training in the U.S. National Security Doctrine during the Cold War, torture techniques, and media manipulation. Among them were several criminals active in Argentina, including dictators Jorge Rafael Videla, Eduardo Massera, Roberto Eduardo Viola, and Leopoldo Fortunato Galtieri.

In 1996, the United States declassified documents containing instructional manuals on the use of torture, extortion, and summary execution, targeting members of unions who "distributed propaganda in favor of leftist extremist groups or their interests," "sympathized with demonstrations or strikes," or made "accusations about the government's failure to meet the basic needs of the people."

One of the most notorious torture manuals was KUBARK, which described the process of torture by electric shock. The manuals were declassified by the CIA in 1994.

Critics, including Panama’s newspaper La Prensa, dubbed it the "School for Assassins." Panamanian President Jorge Illueca called it "the gringo base for destabilizing Latin America." In a 1993 open letter to the Columbus Ledger Enquirer, former instructor Commander Joseph Blair stated: "In my three years of service at the School, I never heard anything about lofty goals like promoting freedom, democracy, and human rights. Latin American military personnel came to Columbus solely for economic benefits, opportunities to buy quality goods exempt from their countries’ import duties, and free transportation, paid for by U.S. taxpayers." According to Democratic Senator Martin Meehan (Massachusetts): "If the School of the Americas held an alumni reunion, it would bring together some of the most infamous and undesirable thugs and wrongdoers in the hemisphere."

In 1976, a U.S. Democratic Party parliamentary commission during Jimmy Carter's administration acknowledged the criminal practices taught and promoted at the School and forced its suspension. In 1977, under the Torrijos-Carter Treaties regarding the Panama Canal, the U.S. agreed to Panama’s demand to relocate the School to Fort Benning, Georgia.

== Practice of Forced Disappearance ==
General Jorge Rafael Videla explained in an interview with journalist María Seoane:

No, we couldn’t shoot them. Let’s say a number, say five thousand. Argentine society, fickle and treacherous, would not have tolerated the executions: two in Buenos Aires yesterday, six in Córdoba today, four in Rosario tomorrow, and so on up to five thousand, ten thousand, thirty thousand. There was no other way. They had to be disappeared. That’s what the repression manuals from Algeria and Vietnam taught. We all agreed. Should we reveal where the remains are? But what could we point to? The sea, the Río de la Plata, the Riachuelo? At one point, we considered releasing the lists. But then it was raised: if we declare them dead, the unanswerable questions come immediately: who killed them, where, how.

— Jorge Rafael Videla

On U.S. television on September 14, 1977, Videla stated:

We must accept as a reality that there are disappeared persons in Argentina. The issue is not in affirming or denying that reality, but in understanding the reasons why these people have disappeared. There are several key reasons: they disappeared to go underground and join the subversion; they disappeared because the subversion eliminated them for being considered traitors to their cause; they disappeared because, in a confrontation involving fires and explosions, the body was mutilated beyond recognition. And I accept that there may be disappeared due to excesses committed during the repression. This is our responsibility; the other alternatives are not under our control. And it is for this last one that we take responsibility: the government has made every effort to prevent such cases from recurring.

— Jorge Rafael Videla

On the last Sunday of October 1979, a month after the Inter-American Commission on Human Rights visited Argentina, Pope John Paul II publicly addressed the issue of the disappeared and those detained without trial in Argentina at St. Peter's Square. On December 13, 1979, Videla held a press conference in Buenos Aires, where journalist José Ignacio López asked him about the Pope’s statements, prompting a lengthy response invoking his Christian view of human rights, including the following reflection, which became historic:

Regarding the disappeared, as long as they remain as such, they are an enigma. If the person reappeared, well, they would receive treatment X, and if their reappearance confirmed their death, they would receive treatment Z. But as long as they are disappeared, they cannot receive any special treatment; they are an enigma, a disappeared person, they have no entity, they are neither dead nor alive, they are disappeared.

— Jorge Rafael Videla

Detentions were typically carried out by heavily armed military or paramilitary groups of four or five individuals, who coordinated with security forces to clear the area of operation. Victims were seized on the street, in bars, cinemas, their homes, or wherever they were at the time.

Once detained, they were taken to a clandestine detention center (up to 610 are estimated to have operated) where they were interrogated under systematic torture. In most cases, they were ultimately killed, and their bodies were disappeared through death flights, buried in mass graves, or marked as unidentified (N.N.).

In the early years, although the media did not provide direct information about what was happening, they occasionally reported on detentions or the discovery of bodies:

Three people were reportedly kidnapped in the city of Luján. Additionally, the homes of lawyer Raúl Castro and student José Luis Caldú were reportedly violated. The incidents allegedly occurred between 9 PM Tuesday and 3 AM Wednesday by a group of 10 to 12 unidentified individuals who identified themselves as members of a commando group.

Three bodies appeared on the Uruguayan coast of the Río de la Plata, opposite the city of Juan Lacaze. They were bound hand and foot and showed signs of torture and beatings. Seventeen have been found since April 22, generally mutilated and naked.

A young woman was kidnapped in front of the Faculty of Medical Sciences in La Plata while waiting for a bus at the Paseo del Bosque stop with many others. Three of the four occupants of a Torino car got out and seized the girl. She screamed for help and clung to a streetlight pole. Several bystanders attempted to intervene, but the three kidnappers intimidated them, drawing firearms and firing shots into the air. They then forced the girl into the vehicle and sped off. According to some witnesses, one of the kidnappers dropped a police non-commissioned officer’s credential, which was later handed to the authorities for verification.

Detentions were carried out by military and police forces, sometimes with active collaboration from civilian officials or authorities of the companies, schools, or universities the victims were associated with. No agency provided information on the victims’ whereabouts to their families. Judges did not process the habeas corpus petitions filed, and in many cases, the lawyers filing these petitions were themselves disappeared.

== Number of victims ==
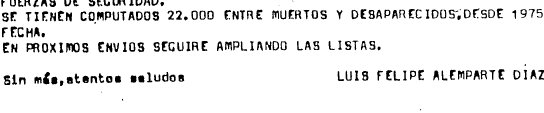
Secret report by Arancibia Clavel quantifying 22000 dead and disappeared as of July 1978.

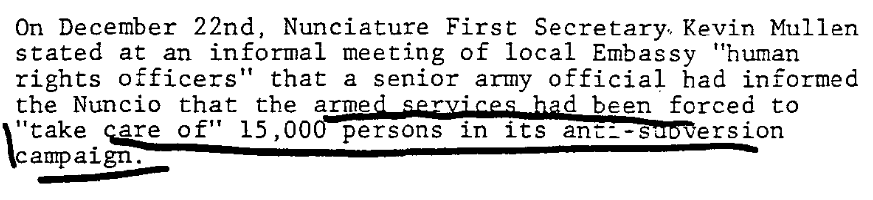
U.S. Embassy document revealing that by late 1978, the Vatican had been informed by senior Argentine dictatorship officials about 15000 disappeared dead.

=== Documents ===
In 1978, Chilean secret agent Enrique Arancibia Clavel sent a report listing some of the dead and disappeared between 1975 and July 1978 in Argentina, stating that up to that date, 22000 had been recorded. The document partially reveals the existence of individualized records of the disappeared, which were never acknowledged or found by those responsible.

Another U.S. Embassy document in Argentina, signed by the human rights officer Allen Harris, recounts that on December 22, 1978, the first secretary of the Nunciature, Kevin Mullen, reported that a senior government official informed Nuncio Pio Laghi that they "had been forced to ‘deal with’ 15000 people in their anti-subversive campaign."

The initial list from the Permanent Assembly for Human Rights recorded 5,566 cases, roughly aligning with the 5,580 complaints filed in 1979 with the Inter-American Commission on Human Rights.

The National Commission on the Disappearance of Persons (CONADEP), established at the end of the dictatorship by Raúl Alfonsín’s government, was tasked with directly receiving complaints from victims and their relatives and forwarding them to the civil judiciary. Over eight months, it received reports of 7,380 disappearances. After its report, the book Nunca Más, was published, the Secretariat of Human Rights continued receiving complaints, raising the number of reported disappeared to 8,961.

By 2003, the Argentine Secretariat of Human Rights had recorded approximately 13,000 cases.

In 2009, the National Memory Archive (ANM) recorded 7,140 victims of forced disappearance, 1,336 murdered victims, and 2,793 released/survivors, totaling 7380 victims. According to the ANM, CONADEP’s original records included 544 individuals mistakenly listed as disappeared and 1,009 cases that were either duplicated or merged with other records.

Dictator Jorge Rafael Videla himself suggested in an interview that the number of disappearances could reach "up to 30,000":

No, we couldn’t shoot them. Let’s say a number, say five thousand. Argentine society, fickle and treacherous, would not have tolerated the executions: two in Buenos Aires yesterday, six in Córdoba today, four in Rosario tomorrow, and so on up to five thousand, ten thousand, thirty thousand.

— Transcription of Jorge Rafael Videla

Human rights organizations, the union movement, and most political parties traditionally estimate the number of disappearances at a round figure of 30000. In a 2009 letter, Eduardo Luis Duhalde, then Secretary of Human Rights of Argentina, defended this number based on variables such as the number of detention and extermination centers, the proportion of habeas corpus petitions filed, and military statements. He stated that "the figure of 30000 is neither arbitrary nor capricious, although it is regrettable to reduce the Argentine tragedy to an accounting issue," as "the massive, criminal, and abject nature is not measured by arithmetic results, at least for those who believe that killing one person is killing humanity."

=== Debate on the Number ===
Dictatorship officials consistently denied responsibility for disappearances during the National Reorganization Process, sometimes claiming that the disappeared had gone into hiding voluntarily, were still alive, or had been killed by guerrilla organizations. Since then, a denialist current in Argentina has sought to negate the facts or dispute estimates of the number of disappeared.

In 1997, former carapintada military officer and ex-national deputy Aldo Rico questioned the disappearances, stating publicly that "If the opposition wins, many of the 11,600 disappeared will reappear." In 2001, actress Elena Cruz also denied the 30,000 figure, claiming there were only "2,400 disappeared."

In 2003, former dictator Reynaldo Bignone, interviewed by French journalist Marie-Monique Robin, denied the 30,000 figure, stating there were "only 8,000, of which 1,500 were under their government."

In November 2013, Buenos Aires newspaper Perfil published an article in which Luis Labraña, a former Montoneros militant, claimed the 30,000 figure was invented by him to secure a subsidy. Later, Labraña reaffirmed this on television, stating the figure was fabricated while Montonero leaders were in Europe seeking subsidies from NGOs. Luis Labraña renounced his past involvement with the guerrillas and called for the release of the soldiers imprisoned for crimes against humanity. According to journalist and human rights lawyer Pablo Llonto, Labraña’s claim is false, as there are no records of his participation in the 1979 trips to the Netherlands by Madres de Plaza de Mayo. Llonto also notes that the 30,000 figure predates these trips, citing a January 24, 1978, El País article that mentions it.

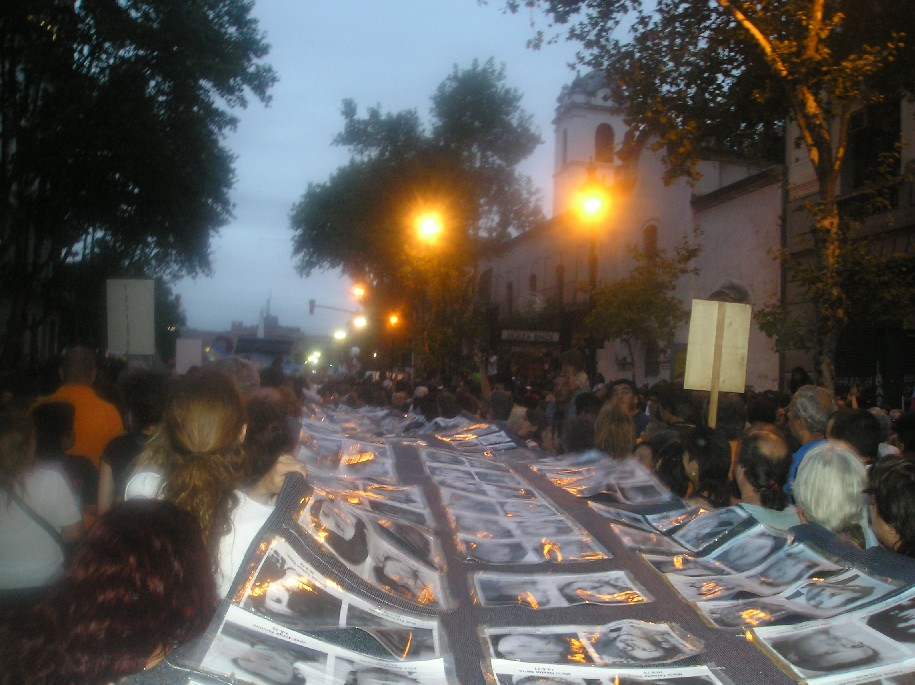
March with photos of the disappeared during the 30th anniversary of the 1976 coup.

On January 25, 2016, Buenos Aires Culture Minister and Colón Theater director Darío Lopérfido, from the Radical Civic Union, stated regarding the number of dictatorship victims: "There were not 30,000 disappeared in Argentina; that number was agreed upon at a closed table to secure subsidies." The state only subsidized the families of 9,334 reported disappeared.

We use the figure of 30,000 because the perpetrators themselves raised it to 45,000. We are still receiving reports from grandchildren born in captivity because people are now finding the courage to tell the truth. What malice to start juggling numbers! Let him provide the list of those he thinks there are, if he has it. [...] Entire families were decimated, and no one filed complaints. We recorded as best we could.

— Estela de Carlotto

Nobel Peace Prize winner Adolfo Pérez Esquivel responded to Lopérfido:

I would ask Lopérfido to inform himself. I am a survivor of the dictatorship era. This person wants to reverse a reality that is impossible to reverse. This government [of Mauricio Macri] wants to reverse many things.

— Adolfo Pérez Esquivel

Months later, Falklands War veteran, Army Major, former carapintada, and then-Customs Director Juan Gómez Centurión questioned the number of dictatorship deaths, stating, "It’s not the same to have 8,000 truths as 22,000 lies." He also opposed the notion that the dictatorship involved a systematic and centralized plan of disappearance:

The idea of a systematic plan is an adjective; objectively, the reality is different. (...) I don’t believe there was a plan to disappear people; it was a clumsy coup d’état dealing with an enemy they didn’t know how to handle, which began in 1975 with a constitutional order of annihilation.

== Judicial processes ==
=== In Argentina ===
Upon assuming the presidency on December 10, 1983, President Raúl Alfonsín (1927–2009) signed decrees creating the National Commission on the Disappearance of Persons (CONADEP) to investigate human rights violations from 1976 to 1983. Its investigation, documented in the book Nunca Más, was delivered to Alfonsín on September 20, 1984.

The Radical government ordered the prosecution of the main perpetrators of state terrorism in the Trial of the Juntas, with significant participation from prosecutor Julio César Strassera. The verdict sentenced members of the military juntas to penalties for crimes against humanity, including life imprisonment for the main culprits. This was the first time such perpetrators were tried using only the law, by the same courts that try any citizen, applying the criminal code in force in Argentina since 1922. This unprecedented event set a global precedent, leading to the inclusion of forced disappearance in the Penal Code, adopted by several countries, and its designation as a crime against humanity by the UN.

However, yielding to pressure from military sectors (and some civilian sectors), the National Congress passed the Due Obedience and Full Stop Laws, proposed by Alfonsín’s government, which extinguished criminal actions against mid-level participants in state terrorism.

The convicted remained imprisoned until 1990, when Justicialist President Carlos Menem pardoned them, allowing the release of those not prosecuted for other crimes not covered by the pardon, such as the appropriation of children born in captivity.

On April 15, 1998, Law 24.952 repealed the Full Stop (No. 23.492) and Due Obedience (No. 23.521) Laws, which were later declared "irremediably null" (Article 1) by Law 25.779 on September 2, 2003. On June 14, 2005, the Supreme Court of Argentina declared these laws unconstitutional and upheld the nullity law. Appeals to revoke the 1990 pardons are currently ongoing.

As of 2017, relatives, some organized in Abuelas de Plaza de Mayo, continue searching for grandchildren—children of the disappeared—who were stolen and raised by other families, in some cases by the same military personnel involved in their parents’ disappearance.

On August 4, 2006, the first direct perpetrator of disappearances was convicted: former Argentine Federal Police non-commissioned officer Julio Simón, also known as "Turco Julián," was sentenced to 25 years in prison. Simón had been protected by the Due Obedience and Full Stop Laws, which prevented new trials against repressors.

=== Abroad ===
For over 25 years, laws like Due Obedience and Full Stop prevented Argentina from prosecuting all those accused of kidnappings, forced disappearances, torture, and murders during the military dictatorship. As a result, human rights organizations and families of the disappeared sought justice abroad. Since 1985, trials were opened in Italy for Italian-origin citizens disappeared in Argentina. The first trial concluded in Rome on December 6, 2000, with life sentences for generals Guillermo Suárez Mason and Omar Riveros. The Rome court also sentenced Juan Carlos Gerardi, José Luis Porchetto, Alejandro Puertas, Héctor Oscar Maldonado, and Roberto Julio Rossin to 24 years for the murder of Martino Mastinu.

In France, a trial was held for the kidnapping and murder of two French nuns. Lieutenant Commander Alfredo Astiz, alias "Angel of Death," was sentenced to life imprisonment. Later, criminal complaints against Argentine dictatorship members were filed in Spain, Germany, Switzerland, and Sweden. In Spain, trials began in 1996, and on April 19, 2005, former frigate captain Adolfo Francisco Scilingo, who had described the death flights in Argentina, was sentenced to life imprisonment.

On July 11, 2001, the Nuremberg Court issued international arrest warrants for General Carlos Guillermo Suárez Mason for his role in the May 1977 murder of German sociologist Elisabeth Käsemann in Buenos Aires. On December 21, 2001, the same court issued warrants for Admiral Emilio Eduardo Massera, Colonel Pedro Alberto Durán Sáenz, and General Juan Bautista Sasiaiñ for their roles in Käsemann’s murder. Extradition requests to Germany were rejected by the Argentine judiciary.

On November 28, 2003, at the request of the Nuremberg prosecutor’s office, the court issued warrants for former Junta member Jorge Rafael Videla, Admiral Emilio Eduardo Massera, and General Guillermo Suárez Mason for their roles in the murders of German citizens Elisabeth Käsemann and Claus Zieschank in Argentina.

European trials played a significant role in pressuring Argentina’s judiciary and government, which, nearly 30 years after the coup, annulled the impunity laws to prosecute those accused of human rights crimes during the dictatorship in Argentina, avoiding extradition demands from Spain, Italy, France, and Germany.

== Cultural Impact ==
One hundred thousand disappeared
lost in the jails of South America
Cuddle up baby
Cuddle up tight
Cuddle up baby
keep it all out of sight
undercover
Keep it all out of sight
Undercover of the night
.............................................
Cien mil desaparecidos,
Perdidos en las cárceles de Sudamérica.
Acurrúcate, cariño,
Acurrúcate fuerte.
Acurrúcate, cariño,
Mantén todo fuera de la vista
Encubierto
Mantén todo fuera de la vista
Encubierto de la noche.

Rolling Stones: "Undercover of the Night"
Album Undercover (1983).

Numerous artistic works have centered on forced disappearance in Argentina (for example, FilmAffinity lists 46 fictional films related to state terrorism and the disappeared). Below is a brief list of some notable works:

- Proteo (1979), novel by Morris West
- Preso sin nombre, celda sin número (1982), book by Jacobo Timerman about his own disappearance in clandestine detention centers during the Argentine civic-military dictatorship (1976–1983).
- "Los dinosaurios", song by Argentine musician Charly García from the album Clics modernos (1983):

The friends from the neighborhood can disappear,
the radio singers can disappear,
those in the newspapers can disappear,
the person you love can disappear.
Those in the air can disappear in the air,
those in the street can disappear in the street.
The friends from the neighborhood can disappear,
but the dinosaurs will disappear.

- The Official Story, 1985 film by Luis Puenzo (winner of the Academy Award for Best International Feature Film), about the case of a disappeared couple’s daughter secretly given up for adoption.
- The Night of the Pencils, 1986 film by Héctor Olivera, based on the book by María Seoane, depicting the 1976 kidnapping and torture of 10 students in La Plata by the military dictatorship.
- Tangos, the Exile of Gardel (1985), film by Pino Solanas, portraying the struggles of exiles due to state terrorism.
- La amiga (1988), film by Jeanine Meerapfel, about the experiences of two friends during the dictatorship, starring Cipe Lincovsky and Swedish actress Liv Ullmann.
- Sur (1988), film by Pino Solanas (winner of the Best Director award at the Cannes Film Festival), about the return of a prisoner victim of state terrorism after the regime’s fall.
- A Wall of Silence (1993), film by Lita Stantic, featuring British actress Vanessa Redgrave, about a British filmmaker arriving in Buenos Aires to document the story of a disappeared person’s wife.
- Garage Olimpo (1999), film by Marco Bechis, depicting a story largely set in an illegal detention center.
- Imagining Argentina (2003), film by Christopher Hampton, about a theater director who discovers a psychic ability to locate disappeared persons during the dictatorship, starring Antonio Banderas and Emma Thompson.
- Chronicle of an Escape (2006), film by Adrián Caetano, about the hardships faced by four detainees in the Mansión Seré clandestine detention center and their subsequent escape.
- The Secret in Their Eyes (2009), film by Juan José Campanella (winner of the Academy Award for Best International Feature Film), set during the period of disappearances, depicting the regime of impunity under the military.
- Clandestine Childhood (2012), film by Benjamín Ávila, about a child forced into hiding due to the threat of state terrorism against his parents.
- "200 años" (2010), by the Córdoba alternative rock band Black Rose, references—among other Argentine historical events in protest—the disappeared during the last dictatorship:

Thousands of disappeared,
for not thinking the same,
were banished,
from their own freedom.

- "Esos Ojos", song by No Te Va Gustar.
- They Shot the Piano Player (2023), animated film and graphic novel by Fernando Trueba and Javier Mariscal, about the 1976 forced disappearance in Buenos Aires of Brazilian pianist Tenório Júnior.

Other artistic works address forced disappearance elsewhere in the world:

- They Dance Alone (1988), song by British musician Sting, focusing on the mothers of Chile’s disappeared.
- Vuelos, song by the rock band Bersuit Vergarabat.
- Besando la tierra, song by the thrash metal band Nepal.
- Indultados, song by the rock band Kapanga.
- Desaparecidos, song by the hard rock band El Reloj.
- Desapariciones (1984), written by Panamanian musician Rubén Blades, not specifically referencing a political/geographical situation but written about disappearances in Panama, performed with great success by Argentine band Los Fabulosos Cadillacs.
- Canción inútil (2000), song by Argentine punk-rock band Attaque 77.
- Cadáveres (1987), epic and neobaroque poem by anarchist sociologist and poet Néstor Perlongher, written in 1981 during a trip to São Paulo in exile.

== See also ==
- Abuelas de Plaza de Mayo
- Dirty War
- HIJOS
- National Commission on the Disappearance of Persons
- Impunity laws
- Madres de Plaza de Mayo
- Operation Condor
- National Reorganization Process

== Bibliography ==
- Agamben, Giorgio (1998). Homo Sacer. El poder soberano y la nuda vida [Homo Sacer: Sovereign Power and Bare Life] (in Spanish). Valencia: Pre-Textos. 84-8191-206-9.
- Lázara, Simón (1987). "Desaparición forzada de personas, Doctrina de la seguridad nacional y la influencia de los factores económico-sociales" [Forced disappearance of persons, National Security Doctrine, and the influence of socio-economic factors]. Crimen contra la Humanidad [Crime against Humanity] (in Spanish). Buenos Aires: Asamblea Permanente por los Derechos Humanos.
- Lopresti, Roberto P. (1998). Constitución Argentina Comentada [Commented Argentine Constitution] (in Spanish). Buenos Aires: Unilat. ISBN 987-96049-3-8.
- Robin, Marie-Monique. "La doctrina francesa y el terror en América Latina" [The French doctrine and terror in Latin America] (in Spanish). Archived from the original on November 17, 2010.
- Balza, Martín Antonio (February 24, 2005). "Memorias de un general retirado" [Memoirs of a retired general]. II Congreso Internacional sobre Víctimas del Terrorismo (in Spanish). Colombia: Universidad Sergio Arboleda. Archived from the original on September 28, 2007.
