= Marcelo Sajen =

Argentine serial rapist (1965–2004)

Marcelo Mario Sajen (1965 – December 30, 2004), known as El Turco, was an Argentine serial rapist. He raped at least 93 women between 1985 and 2004 in Córdoba, Argentina, but was suspected of attacking around double or triple the reported amount. To avoid arrest, he committed suicide by shooting himself in the head on December 30, 2004.

== Biography ==
Sajen committed bigamy and had five sons and three daughters from both spouses. The two families lived blocks apart and reportedly knew each other. His first confirmed violation occurred when he was 19, on September 9, 1985, in Pilar; he attacked a young woman on the road from behind and dragged her to a nearby wasteland where he raped her. He was caught in the act, convicted, and sentenced to six years imprisonment, of which he served only four. He began assaulting again in 1991 until September 8, 1999, when he was jailed for robbing a pizzeria and raping a girl in the La Cañada neighborhood. He was sentenced to five and a half years, but as he benefitted from the 2x1 law, he was released in 2002. Shortly after his release, he began to attack yet again, with his final assault occurring on December 27, 2004, one day before his capture. According to complaints filed by victims, he had raped 93 women in 80 attacks carried out between 1991 and 2004 (in one act, he had managed to abuse three young people at once).

== Modus operandi ==
Sajen's victims were always women of short stature and under 30 years of age. Some reports said his victims were between 17 and 25 years old. He attacked them from behind, held them with his right arm, and kept them at gunpoint with his left. According to some victims, he threatened to harm them if they dared to look at him, and promised that "nothing bad would happen" if they followed his orders. Sajen would also force his victims to walk several blocks away from the original abduction site – regardless if there were passers-by or not – to a vacant lot, where he raped the women. After he finished, he robbed them of all their valuables and fled the area.

== Investigation and suicide ==
Since 2002, young girls began to avoid walking through the Sarmiento Park route to the National University when rumors began to circulate that the rapist was active there. The case was slow to solve due to the few complaints in the first years, handling by different judges, and, cases were considered separate until 2003. The following year, a victim referred to as Ana sent an email that was widely disseminated on social media. In the email, Ana claimed that the police station had told her that she was not the rapist's first victim, and she advised women to "not walk alone, not be careless and not trust the police...we have to be prepared and mentalized that if someone approaches us from behind, puts a hand on our shoulders or grabs us, the only way to get away is by screaming, throwing yourself to the ground, calling for help, running into a nearby building or simply running away..." Authorities were pressured into solving the cases, and the governor ordered the collection of DNA from all male residents of Córdoba. After an identikit was published that supposedly corresponded to the wanted rapist, one of the victims believed that she recognized her attacker as Gustavo Camargo, a greengrocer from the San Vicente de Córdoba neighborhood. He was detained for 41 days based on his resemblance to the sketch and that, like the rapist, he did not wear underpants. Investigators believed that they had caught her suspect until his innocence was proven with a DNA test.

In September 2004, the prosecutor, Ugarte (later appointed judge), took charge of the case and verified similar attacks occurred between 1991 and 1997 in the San Vicent neighborhood and its surroundings, which temporarily ceased before resuming from 1999 to 2000. It was deduced that the offender was likely imprisoned during this period, and investigators devised a list of suspects fitting that condition, Sajen being among them. His wife, Zulma Villalón, allowed a blood sample to be taken from one of their children and brought a comb and toothbrush belonging to her husband. The DNA on the objects was later successfully matched to semen samples retrieved from the victims.

On December 23, 2004, the police raided one of the houses in the Villa Urquiza neighborhood, but Sajen had fled by that time. Five days later, a former jailmate reported his location. Sajen later shot himself in the temple with an 11.25 caliber pistol in the garden of a house in Tío Pujio. He was found and transported to the Municipal Emergency Hospital of Córdoba, where he died two days later due to complications from his injuries. According to some media sources, his wife and 18-year-old son were admitted to the same facility after a suicide attempt and nervous breakdowns.

== Aftermath ==
Upon learning of Sajen's capture, the mayor of Córdoba, Luis Juez, said in a public statement that "it was a great peace of mind that the most wanted criminal is dying in a hospital. It is the best news that the people of Córdoba could receive at the end of the year, because the truth is that this man had gained in mischief and in cunning, infamy, keeping the people of Córdoba in anguish." His wife, Zulma, apologized on his behalf and for their children, notifying that she was unaware of what her husband had done, and asked not to hold a grudge against them.

== In the media ==
In 2021, the film based on Sajen's crimes, La noche más larga, was released. Dante Leguizámon, who had written a book covering the case with co-author Claudio Gleser, criticized the film for the way the victims are portrayed (the actresses dressing in suggestive clothing, while most of the victims were young students or working-class women), the unnecessary repetition of rape scenes, and showing the rapist's genitalia.
