= Fautario =

Fautario is a surname. Notable people with the surname include:

- Hector Fautario (1924–2017), Argentine Air Force general
- Simone Fautario (born 1987), Italian footballer
