= Full stop law =

1986 law in Argentina

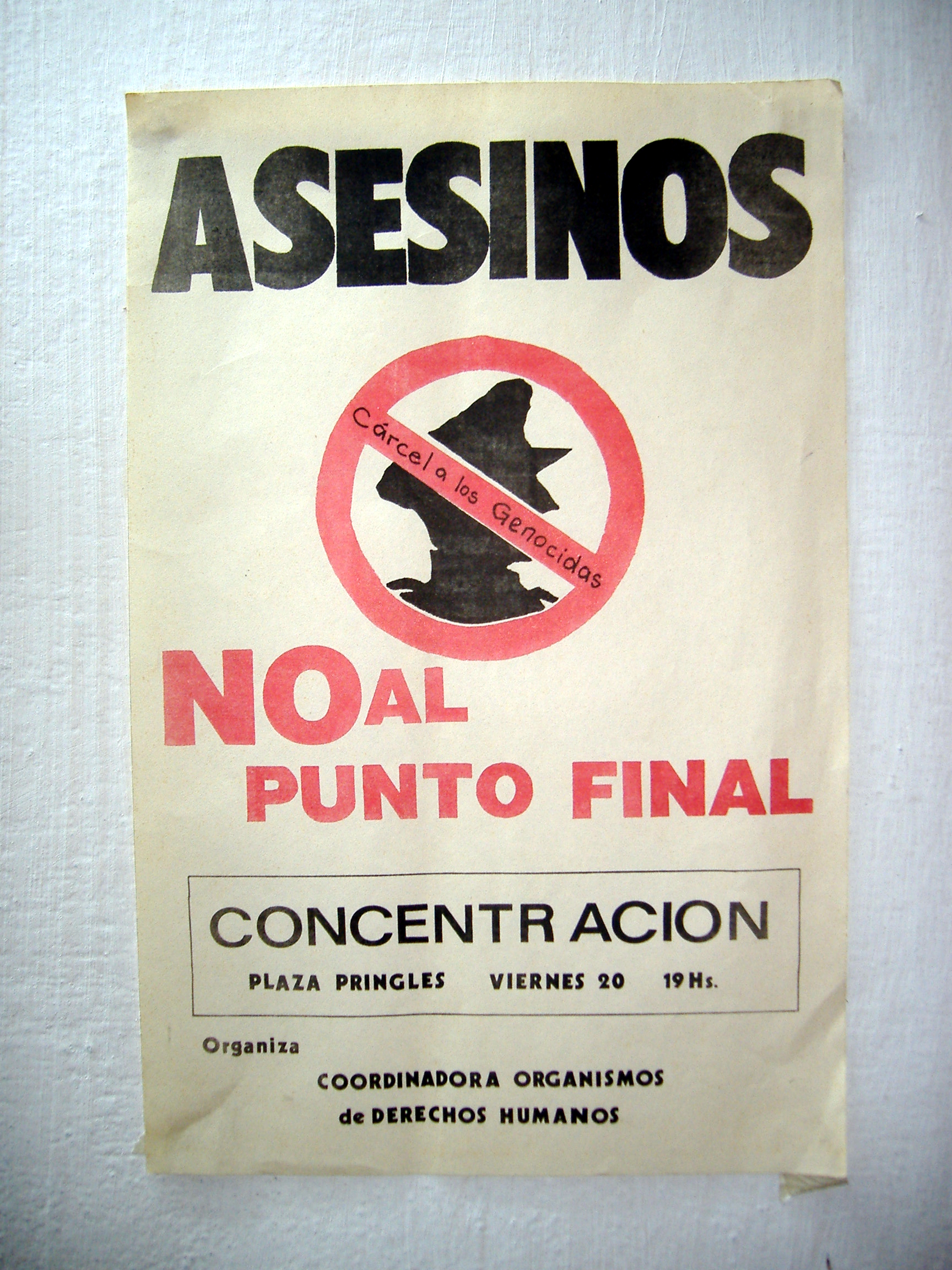
A poster calling for a demonstration against the passing of the law

The Full stop law, Ley de Punto Final, was passed by the National Congress of Argentina in 1986, three years after the end of the military dictatorship of the Proceso de Reorganización Nacional (1976 to 1983) and restoration of democracy. It mandated the end of the investigation and prosecution of those accused of political violence during the dictatorship. Formally, this law is referred to by number (Law No. 23492), like all others in Argentine legislation, but Ley de Punto Final is the designation in common use, even in official speeches.

== History ==
It was passed after the government in 1985 had prosecuted men at the top of the military hierarchies in the Trial of the Juntas for crimes committed during the Dirty War against political dissidents. Several officers were convicted and sentenced; the government's security and military forces had "disappeared" and killed an estimated 15,000-30,000 people.

The law mandated the end of investigation and prosecution of people accused of political violence during the dictatorship and up to the restoration of democratic rule on 10 December 1983. It was passed on 24 December 1986, after only a 3-week debate. Its text is very short; it has seven articles. Article No. 5 excepts from the application of the law the cases of identity forgery and forced disappearance of minors.

The Ley de Punto Final was extremely controversial in its time and afterward. Under pressure from the military, the law was proposed by the Radical administration of President Raúl Alfonsín as a means to stop prosecution of additional suspects among military and security officers after General Jorge Videla, Admiral Emilio Massera, General Roberto Viola, Admiral Armando Lambruschini, and General Orlando Agosti had been prosecuted. Alfonsín was initially opposed to this law, but under threat of a coup d'état, he accepted the legislation. In the Chamber of Deputies, 114 deputies voted for the law, 17 against, and two abstained; in the Senate, 25 senators voted for, and 10 against.

This law had a complement in the Law of Due Obedience, passed in 1987, which exempted subordinates from prosecution when they were carrying out orders. Both laws were repealed by the National Congress in 2003. The Supreme Court of Justice ruled both laws were unconstitutional on 14 June 2005.

The government re-opened prosecution of cases for crimes against humanity. The first of such cases, against the former Buenos Aires Provincial Police second-in-command Miguel Etchecolatz, ended in September 2006 with his conviction on several counts of kidnapping, torture and murder. In sentencing him to life imprisonment, the tribunal said that the dictatorship's state terrorism against political dissidents was a form of genocide. It was the first time in the Argentine trials that genocide had been applied to the assaults against the class of political dissidents.

== See also ==
- Amnesty law
- Trial of the Juntas
- Law of Due Obedience
- Carapintadas
- Impunity laws (Argentina)
