= Emilio F. Mignone =

Emilio Fermín Mignone (July 23, 1922 - December 21, 1998) Argentine lawyer and founder of the Centre for Legal and Social Studies (CELS), was a "central figure of the most transcendental social movement of the last quarter of the twentieth century in Argentina, the human rights movement" that strengthened and developed in the struggle against Argentina's military dictatorship of 1976-1983 and its aftermath. He died of cancer in Buenos Aires at the age of 76.

== Early life ==
Emilio F. Mignone was born in Luján, Buenos Aires. He was educated as a lawyer, as the inaugural President of the National University of Luján.

== Career ==
Mignone worked for the Argentine Ministry of Justice in the 1950s. He spent 6 years from 1963 to 1969 as Argentina's representative to the Organization of American States (OAS), in Washington DC. He returned to Argentina and was the under-secretary of Education in the Peronist government. In 1973 he became a founding rector of the National University of Luján, located in the city of his birth.

In 1976, Mignone was a practising lawyer in Argentina. His daughter Monica was one of many Argentinians who disappeared after being kidnapped and taken to a government facility. Mignone was the founder and President of CELS Argentine human rights organization (1979) along with five other people who had evidence that their children were victims of state terrorism during the last Argentine military dictatorship. The CELS compiled detailed records on thousands of cases of disappearance, kidnapping, torture, and murder committed by the Argentine military. This pivotal information proved crucial to subsequent investigations concerning the era of the "Dirty War" against leftist guerrillas and those believed to support them. These investigations revealed that approximately 13,000 to 15,000 individuals had lost their lives, often enduring torture beforehand, and an additional 10,000 had been subjected to abductions and prolonged imprisonment. Additionally, the center extended legal support to victims and their families and actively pursued legal cases against the government, aiming to uncover evidence of severe human rights violations. In a series of class-action suits famously recognized as the Perez de Smith cases, Mignone successfully persuaded the Argentine Supreme Court to acknowledge the government's obligation to acknowledge the disappearances and account for the well-being of the disappeared individuals mentioned in the lawsuits. Mignone personally oversaw the center's campaigns to raise public awareness and maintain connections with foreign governments and international human rights organizations, including the United Nations Human Rights Commission. In this role, he played a significant part in ensuring that the human rights situation in Argentina remained a global concern.

In February 1981, Mignone and five other center directors faced arrest, and their offices were subjected to searches but international protests led to their release one week later. After the reinstatement of democratic governance in Argentina in December 1983, the CELS persisted in its role of monitoring and releasing reports concerning the status of human rights and civil liberties within the nation. During this period, Mignone resumed his writing efforts focused on civic education, including the development of a high school curriculum covering topics such as democracy, military rule, and the erosion of civic institutions. In 1998, he actively participated in protests against the government's proposal to demolish the Navy Mechanics School, a location where no less than 4,000 individuals had suffered torture and lost their lives. The government intended to replace it with a monument symbolizing national unity. Ultimately, this site was later designated as a "museum of memory."

Mignone served as CELS president from 1979 until his death in 1998.

The Emilio Mignone International Human Rights Prize has been created in his name. in 2007, by the Ministry of Foreign Affairs of Argentina.
