= Héctor Fautario =

Argentine Air Force general

Héctor Luis Fautario
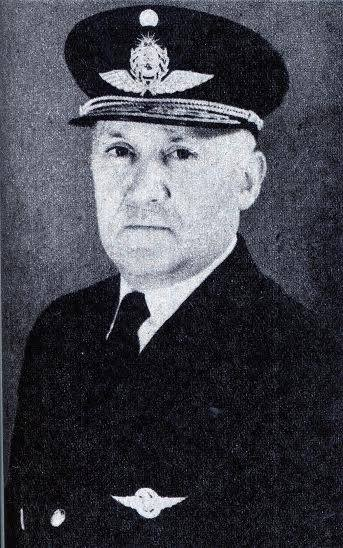
- Brigadier General Fautario in 1972/73
- Born: May 21, 1924
- Died: February 12, 2017 (aged 92)
- Military career
- Allegiance: Argentina
- Branch: Argentine Air Force
- Rank: Brigadier General (equivalent to 3-star or 4-star rank)

Héctor Luis Fautario (May 24, 1924 - February 12, 2017) was an Argentine Air Force general. He was the General Commander of the Argentine Air Force from 1973 to 1975. Shortly prior to the 1976 Argentine coup d'état, he was the government's only remaining loyal senior officer. He had drawn harsh criticism towards himself from the Army and Navy due to his vehement opposition to their repressive plans, and for his refusal to mobilize the Air Force against the guerrillas' strongholds in the north. He was General Jorge Rafael Videla's last obstacle on the way to power.

Military offices
Preceded by Carlos Rey	General Commander of the Argentine Air Force; 1973–1975	Succeeded by Orlando Ramón Agosti
