= Law of Due Obedience =

Former Argentine law

The Law of Due Obedience (Spanish: Ley de obediencia debida) was a law passed by the National Congress of Argentina after the end of the military dictatorship of the Proceso de Reorganización Nacional (which started with a coup d'état in 1976 and ended in 1983). Formally, this law is referred to by number (Law No. 23,521), like all others in Argentine legislation, but Ley de Obediencia Debida is the only designation in common use, even in official speeches.

The law was passed on 4 June 1987. It dictates that it must be assumed, without admitting proof to the contrary, that all officers and their subordinates including common personnel of the Armed Forces, the Police, the Penitentiary Service and other security agencies cannot be legally punished for crimes committed during the dictatorship as they were acting out of due obedience, that is, obeying orders from their superiors (in this case, the heads of the military government, who had already been tried in the Trial of the Juntas).

This law was passed one year after the full stop law in order to contain the discontent of the Armed Forces. It effectively exempted military personnel under the rank of colonel from responsibility for their crimes, which included forced disappearances, illegal detentions, torture and murders. Its text is rather short, with only 7 articles, the second of which contains an exception (the law does not apply to cases of rape, disappearance or identity forgery of minors, or extensive appropriation of real estate).

The Ley de Obediencia Debida and the Ley de Punto Final were repealed by the National Congress in August 2003, which allowed for the re-opening of cases that involved crimes against humanity. The first of such cases, which involved the former Buenos Aires Provincial Police second-in-command Miguel Etchecolatz, ended in September 2006 and laid down jurisprudence by acknowledging that the dictatorship's state terrorism was a form of genocide.

== See also ==
- Amnesty law
- Carapintadas
- Nuremberg Defense
- Impunity laws (Argentina)
