= Guillermo Suárez Mason =

Argentine military officer (1924–2005)

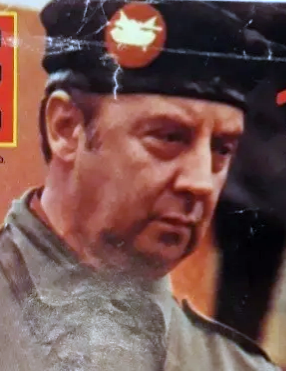
Carlos Guillermo Suárez Mason

Carlos Guillermo Suárez Mason (2 January 1924 – 21 June 2005) was an Argentine military officer convicted for Dirty War crimes during the 1976–1983 military dictatorship. He was in charge of the Batallón de Inteligencia 601.

== Biography ==
Born in Buenos Aires, he enrolled at the National War College in 1944 and took an interest in national politics before his 1948 graduation. A magnetic and charismatic figure, he was involved at that time in several liaisons with prominent women, through whom he invariably furthered his interests; he took little or no interest, however, in the children reported at that time to have been fathered by him.

In September 1951, Suárez Mason took part in a failed military coup against the populist President Juan Perón. He was forced to retreat to Uruguay, and later collaborated with the overthrow of Perón in 1955. He was received back in Buenos Aires with honours following the coup's success on 19 September.

Suárez Mason taught at the School of Higher War Studies, and rose in rank, becoming a military attaché to the Argentine Embassy in Ecuador in 1971, and a director of military intelligence in 1972. He was attached to the Operativo Independencia counterinsurgency mission in 1975, and upon the March 1976 coup against President Isabel Perón, was appointed Commander of the First Army Corps, a unit whose principal duty was to garrison the capital.

During the subsequent dictatorship, Suárez Mason had purview over a number of the most notorious clandestine detention centers in the Greater Buenos Aires, which led to the disappearance of between 8,000 and 30,000 people. Those under his command included Automotores Orletti, Pozo de Banfield, La Cacha, and El Olimpo. He also supervised Policía Bonaerense Chief Ramón Camps, as well as Army Intelligence Battalion 601, which carried out numerous extortions and kidnappings for ransom.

He financed Cabildo, a far-right Catholic publication known at the time for its espousal of antisemitism, and relaunched the previously banned publication. Suárez Mason earned a reputation as a hard-line figure in the regime, particularly after steps toward political liberalization began in 1979, and fell out of favor with the president, General Jorge Videla, after the latter's cancellation of Operation Soberanía (the aborted 1978 invasion of neighboring Chile, at the height of the Beagle Conflict).

Suárez Mason was relieved of his post at the First Army Corps in January 1980 and made Chairman of the Joint Military Chiefs. He oversaw Argentine tactical support for the July 1980 "Cocaine Coup" in Bolivia, and later chaired the Latin American chapter of the World Anti-Communist League.

In December 1981, Suárez Mason was appointed director of the state oil concern YPF by president Leopoldo Galtieri. In 1983, at the end of his tenure, the company recorded a US$6 billion annual loss, the largest in the world at the time. Subsequent investigations revealed that large quantities of fuel had been pirated from YPF by Suárez Mason through Sol Petróleo, a dummy corporation, which made Suárez Mason a wealthy man. The company was also used by him to divert funds to the Contras, as well as to the fascist organization, P2 (to which he belonged).

Following the 1983 return to democracy, an arrest warrant was issued for Suárez Mason. He fled to the United States with a false passport, however, and took up residence in Miami. He was stripped of rank and ordered arrested by President Raúl Alfonsín on charges related to a putative 1985 plot to overthrow the democratic government.

Pursuant to an Interpol order, Suárez Mason was arrested in Foster City, California in January 1987. In May 1988 he was extradited to Buenos Aires to face charges of murdering 43 people and kidnapping a further 23, including newborn babies. Convicted for these crimes, he was pardoned by President Carlos Menem in 1990, and fled to California. He was again extradited in 1995, and was prosecuted by Luis Moreno Ocampo on charges of crimes against humanity for the kidnapping of minors. He was later placed under house arrest, and in 2000, was condemned to life imprisonment in absentia by Italian courts for the murder of eight Italian Argentines.

Although prisoners aged over 70 are usually kept under house arrest in Argentina, Suárez Mason was reimprisoned in 2004 after abusing the terms of his detention. Suárez Mason developed upper gastrointestinal bleed, and died at age 81 at the Military Hospital in Buenos Aires. He had been awaiting the hearing of charges related to 200 kidnappings, 30 murders and the sale of the babies of political prisoners during the military dictatorship of 1976-83 in which he was a central figure.
