= 1976 Argentine coup d'état =

March 1976 military coup d'état in Argentina

- Part of the Cold War in South America and the Dirty War
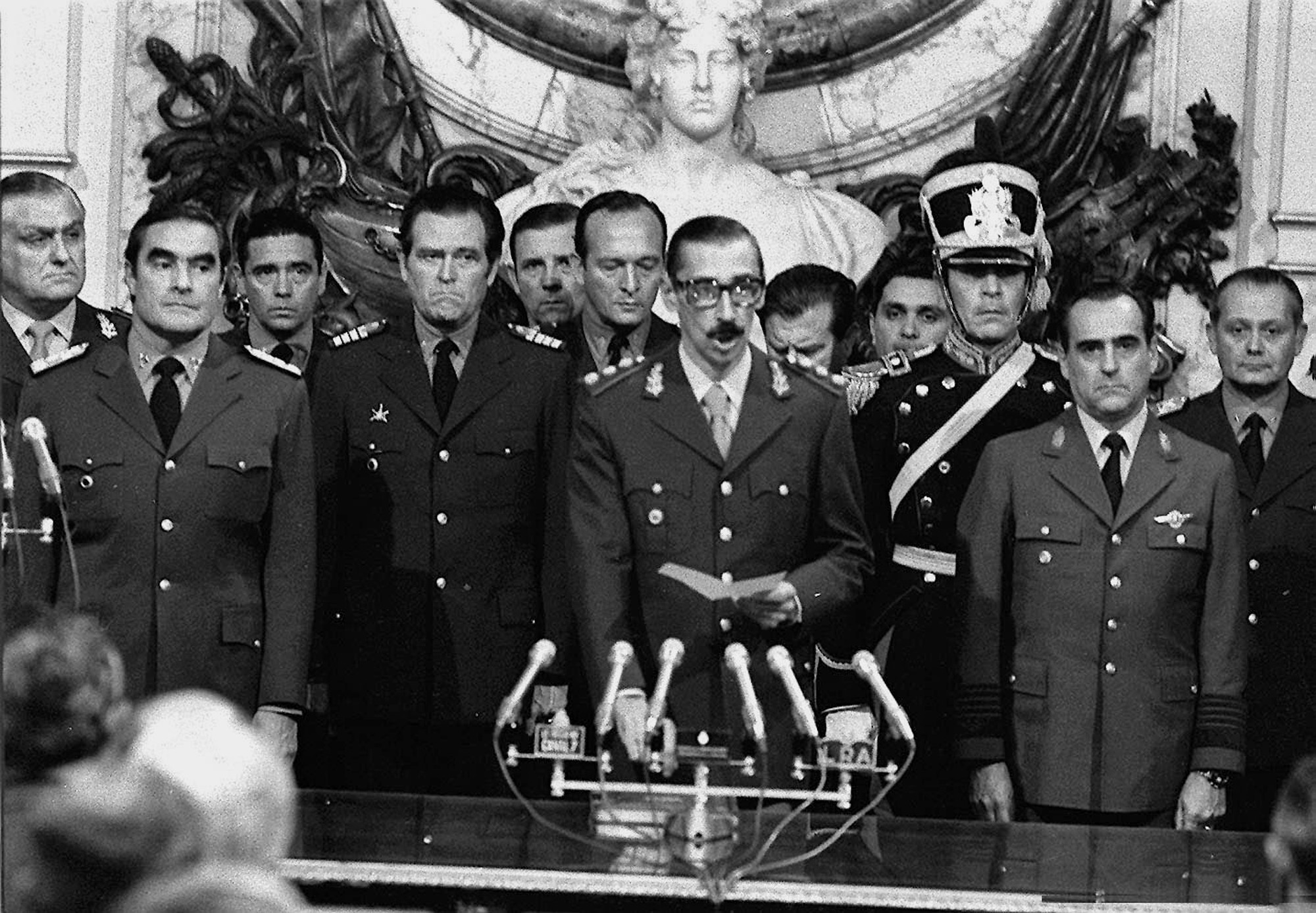
- Jorge Rafael Videla swearing in as president on 29 March 1976
Date	24 March 1976
Location	Casa Rosada, Buenos Aires
Result	Overthrow of Isabel Perón. Jorge Rafael Videla becomes President of Argentina.

Belligerents
(Argentina) Argentine Government; Justicialist Party	(Argentina) Argentine Armed Forces; Army; Navy; Air Force

Commanders and leaders
Isabel Perón (surrendered)	(Argentina) Jorge Rafael Videla

A coup d'état overthrew Isabel Perón as President of Argentina on 24 March 1976. A military junta was installed to replace her; this was headed by Lieutenant General Jorge Rafael Videla, Admiral Emilio Eduardo Massera, and Brigadier-General Orlando Ramón Agosti. The political process initiated on 24 March 1976 took the official name of "National Reorganization Process", and different juntas remained in power until the return to democracy on 10 December 1983.

The military coup had been planned since October 1975; the Perón government learned of the preparations two months before its execution. Henry Kissinger met several times with Argentine Armed Forces leaders after the coup, urging them to destroy their opponents quickly before outcry over human rights abuses grew in the United States.

Given the systematic persecution of a social minority, the period has been claimed by some as a ‘genocidal process’. They point to the sentences of the trials of the perpetrators for crimes against humanity.

== Background ==
When president Juan Perón died of natural causes on 1 July 1974, he was succeeded by his wife (then vice-president) Isabel Perón, also known as "Isabelita" (Little Isabel). Despite her claim as the country's rightful ruler, she rapidly lost political gravitas and power. A group of military officials, tasked by Perón to aide the vice-president, took control in an effort to revitalize Argentina's deteriorating political and social climate. This shift in governance paved the way for the ensuing coup.

On 5 February 1975, Operativo Independencia was launched. This Vietnam-style intervention aimed to eliminate the guerrillas in the Tucumán jungle, who had maintained strongholds in the area as early as May 1974. In October the country was divided into five military zones, with each commander given full autonomy to unleash a carefully planned wave of repression.

On 18 December, a number of warplanes took off from Morón Air Base and strafed the Casa Rosada in an attempt to overthrow Isabel Perón. The rebellion was brought to a halt four days later through arbitration by a chaplain.

However, the military did succeed in removing the only officer remaining loyal to the government, Air Force commander Héctor Fautario. Fautario drew harsh criticism from the Army and Navy owing to his vehement opposition to their repressive plans, and for his refusal to mobilize the Air Force against the guerrillas' strongholds in the north. Fautario was Videla's final obstacle in his pursuit of power.

By January 1976, the guerrilla presence in Tucumán had been reduced to a few platoons. Meanwhile, the military, supported by the local élite, bided its time before ultimately seizing power.

The military regimes in Brazil and Chile were aware of the impending coup in advance, as they were notified by the Argentine Armed Forces before its execution.

According to political scientist Scott Mainwaring, the years prior to the coup were characterized by public perceptions of chaos and power vacuum. There had been extreme radicalization on the left and right, with powerful political actors shifting their support away from democratic political institutions. There was political violence: right-wing and left-wing bombings, kidnappings, assassinations, and factory seizures. At the same time, the governments of Juan Perón and Isabel Perón failed to resolve prominent economic problems.

== Isabel Perón's loss of legitimacy ==
Perón's loss of power, besides the public ridicule, was magnified by the loss of her congressional majority. In addition, her popular support was reduced to a right-wing section of Peronism. By February 1976, three service commanders had requested that she resign from the presidency. Another issue with Perón's presidency was the ongoing guerrilla warfare. Throughout her presidency, Perón struggled against both the Peronist Montoneros and the Marxist People's Revolutionary Army (ERP) left-wing guerrilla organizations as well as the right-wing Argentine Anticommunist Alliance group (AAA). A clear example was the 25 political murders between 20 and 21 March 1975, which had victims on both the left and right wing. Only in late May 1975 did her Social Welfare minister, José López Rega, announce an investigation of the AAA group, though the group had been active for 550 days without a single arrest. As the government finally addressed the AAA, it indicated public dissatisfaction with the current regime's treatment over the AAA. By late March 1976, local press was openly reporting on a coup happening within hours, which led to ramped up political violence between left and right, as those were interested in "settling scores" which led to about 165 people killed from the start of the year until then, which the Perón regime was powerless to stop.

== Coup ==
Shortly before 01:00 am on 24 March, President Perón was detained and taken by helicopter to the El Messidor residence. Major General José Rogelio Villarreal announced her dismissal to Isabel Perón:

"Madam President, the Armed Forces have decided to take political control of the country and you are hereby dismissed and arrested.

At 03:10 all television and radio stations were interrupted. Regular transmissions were cut and replaced by a military march, after which the first communiqué was broadcast:

[...] People are advised that as of today, the country is under the operational control of the General Commanders Junta of the Armed Forces. We recommend to all inhabitants strict compliance with the provisions and directives emanating from the military, security or police authorities, and to be extremely careful to avoid individual or group actions and attitudes that may require drastic intervention from the operating personnel. Signed: General Jorge Rafael Videla, Admiral Emilio Eduardo Massera and Brigadier Orlando Ramón Agosti.

A state of siege and martial law were implemented, as military patrolling spread to every major city. The morning was seemingly uneventful, but as the day progressed, the detentions multiplied. Hundreds of workers, unionists, students, and political activists were abducted from their homes, their workplaces, or in the streets.

== Media coverage ==
At the end of the day on 24 March, the Clarín newspaper had released a second publication detailing the new government takeover, confirming that between 3:10 and 3:15, that the military had taken over the government, replacing Isabel Perón. The paper's front page also declared the military's reason to replace Perón in order to not create a power vacuum. In the coming days, Clarín continued to publish parallel to new developments, but by 28 March the paper was beginning to shift away from coverage of the coup. Additionally, Clarín also released the names of the new cabinet members under Jorge Videla, those being Albano Harguindeguy, Ricardo Franke, Julio Gómez, Osvaldo Cacciatore, José A. Martínez de Hoz, Ricardo Bruera, Horacio Liendo, and Julio J. Bardi. On the release of the 28 March publication, the newspaper also explained that the Junta had been recognized by thirty two countries already as the government of Argentina.

=== Censorship and bias in the media ===
Under Isabel Perón's presidency, media coverage had been severely restricted, applying to both local press as well as foreign press coverage of Argentina. Under Perón, several decrees had been released, one being a news agency registry, and the requirement that all local as well as foreign news outlets follow all the guidelines, the main one being that "domestic and foreign news media are forbidden to carry news about Argentina supplied by foreign news agencies" through decree 1273. Several newspapers, such as La Prensa and La Opinión immediately spoke out against the restrictions, condemning them, and explaining how they are "ambiguous, arbitrary, and absurd". These same newspapers were punished by having their government funding suspended. Under the military government, media coverage was also restricted, with the Junta exercising control over the media. The difference between the two regimes was in the message, however. When the foreign media representatives met with the interim Junta press secretary, Jorge Luis Argiotti, in which he requested "collaboration when reporting matters other than material contained in the communique", which some foreign media outlets took as implicit control over the media. All the same, radio and television in Argentina strictly broadcast Junta communiques, but foreign news reporters still had access to international news as of March 1976.

== Subsequent events ==
The Junta assumed the executive power until 29 March, when Videla was designated president. Congress was disbanded with senators, deputies and staff members being arrested, brutally beaten and thrown out of doors and windows of the Congressional Palace. An entity known as Legislative Assessment Commission (in Spanish: Comisión de Asesoramiento Legislativo - CAL), composed entirely of officers from the military and police, assumed a Legislative role.

Human rights activists state that in the aftermath of the coup and ensuing Dirty War, some 30,000 people, primarily young opponents of the military regime, were "disappeared" or killed. Military men responsible for the killings often spared pregnant women for a time, keeping them in custody until they gave birth, before killing them and giving their infants to childless military families. Kissinger privately assured the military regime that they would have the full support of the United States government in their war and associated actions, a promise that was opposed by the U.S. Ambassador to Argentina at the time, Robert Hill.

The dictatorship counted on the complicity of civil and ecclesiastical sectors, therefore it is usually characterized as a civic-military-ecclesiastical-business dictatorship.

The Junta remained in power until Raúl Alfonsín, democratically elected, took office as President of Argentina, in December 1983.

The 24 March anniversary of the coup is now designated in Argentina as the Day of Remembrance for Truth and Justice.

== United States interest in regime change ==
The American government paid close attention to any changes in regime in Latin America, and had been carefully watching Argentina throughout Perón's presidency. Guerrilla warfare under Perón's presidency had resulted in serious political violence, as well as the murder of John Egan, a U.S. consular to Córdoba, by the Montoneros, which contributed to a feeling of insecurity among Americans in Argentina, as well as the possibility of Americans being the target of guerilla warfare.

The American government also predicted a possible regime change as Perón's regime began to lose political power, noting that in February 1976 the military "dissatisfaction is so pervasive and intense that one [a coup] could occur at any time".

Another worry with a possible regime change was the protection of U.S. interests, those being economic investments in Argentina, from Ford and General Motors to Exxon industrial centers, but those in the U.S. State Department were not worried about major fundamental changes, citing that left-wing groups did not have enough support for a coup and the military was not interested in making sweeping reforms.

== See also ==
- Military coups in Argentina
