= 2x1 law =

Argentine law that reduced sentence time

The 2x1 law (Spanish: Ley del 2x1) was an Argentine law. It was sanctioned in 1994, and established that prisoners detained without a definitive sentence would be benefited from the second year onwards, so that their days as detained would count as the double. The original purpose of the law was to guarantee a swift sentence. Many lawyers exploited the law by using pettifoggery to delay sentences, so that the prisoners would be benefited by it. The law was derogated in 2001.

The law started a controversy in 2017. Luis Muiña was convicted of crimes committed during the 1970s Dirty War, when he was part of a group that kidnapped, tortured, and murdered victims in a torture camp that operated within a hospital. Muiña asked to have his sentence reduced because of this law. The Supreme Court of Argentina approved it: the law made no exception for the dirty war crimes, and although the law was no longer in force, case law required to apply the most benign law. This was controversial because it would set a case law that would benefit many other military convicted by similar crimes. Human rights organizations called for demonstrations against the ruling, which were massive. The Supreme Court reversed its ruling, and requested the Congress to sanction a law that sets a different system of prison release for those crimes than for other ones. The Congress soon followed suit. Muiña returned to prison some days later. Rufino Batalla, another convicted military, had asked for a similar benefit when Muiña was benefited. The Court rejected this case in 2018, in light of the new law sanctioned by the Congress.

== Bibliography ==
- Novaro, Marcos (2017). El Caso Maldonado (in Spanish). Argentina: Edhasa. ISBN 978-987-628-470-7.
