= Armando Lambruschini =

Argentinian admiral (1924–2004)

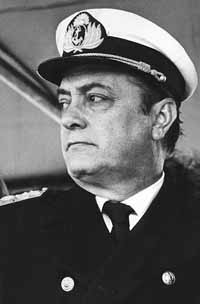
- Born: June 15, 1924; Buenos Aires
- Died: August 15, 2004 (aged 80); Buenos Aires
- Military career
- Allegiance: Argentina
- Branch: Argentine Navy
- Rank: Admiral

Armando Lambruschini (June 15, 1924 – August 15, 2004) was an admiral in the Argentine Navy.

== Life and career ==
Lambruschini enrolled at the Argentine Naval School in 1942, and graduated as a midshipman in 1946. He was later named Captain of the Navy, and served in that capacity aboard the cruiser ARA General Belgrano.

Lambruschini was promoted to Head of the Navy Chiefs of Staff in 1975, a rank second only to Admiral Emilio Massera in that branch. (Both men graduated from the Naval School in the same year.) His prominent role in the National Reorganization Process that took power in the March 1976 coup allowed him to oversee an ambitious modernization plan for the navy.

Ongoing friction between President Jorge Videla and Admiral Massera prompted the latter's September 15, 1978 replacement by Lambruschini, who served in that capacity until September 11, 1981.

Lambruschini's role in the Dirty War during the dictatorship led to numerous criminal charges including murder, illegal arrest, torture, theft and forgery. Indicted during the historic Trial of the Juntas of 1985, Lambruschini was found guilty on December 9 and sentenced to 8 years of imprisonment.

In 1990, he was among those pardoned by President Carlos Menem, and was freed from prison and had his rank of admiral reinstated. He later faced civil lawsuits, and in November 1994 was ordered to pay (with Massera) $1 million to a victim whose family was abducted and murdered in 1976.

In 1997, Italian courts tried him for crimes in absentia; and in 2003 he was accused of further cases of human rights violations. His advanced age, close to 80, afforded him the benefit of house arrest. He died on August 15, 2004.

His 15-year-old daughter Paula was murdered on August 2, 1978, when a large bomb was planted in an adjacent apartment by Lucila Adela Revora, a member of the Montoneros guerrillas. Two neighbors also died in the explosion.

== Sources ==
Military offices
Preceded by Emilio Eduardo Massera	Commander-in-chief of the Argentine Navy; September 15, 1978 — September 11, 1981	Succeeded by Jorge Anaya
