= Basilio Lami Dozo =

Argentine military officer (1929–2017)

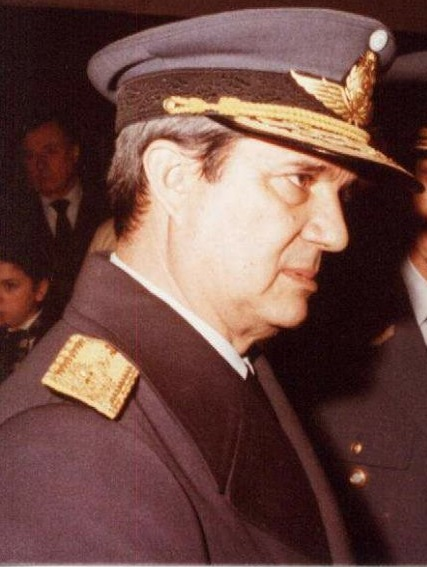
- Lami Dozo in 1982
- Born: Basilio Arturo Ignacio Lami Dozo; 1 February 1929; Santiago del Estero, Argentina
- Died: 1 February 2017 (aged 88); José C. Paz, Argentina
- Military career
- Allegiance: Argentina
- Branch: Argentine Air Force
- Rank: Brigadier General
- Conflicts: Falklands War

Basilio Arturo Ignacio Lami Dozo (1 February 1929 – 1 February 2017) was an Argentine military officer and fighter pilot. He was a notable member and figure of the Argentine military dictatorship known as the National Reorganisation Process (1976–1983) and, along with Leopoldo Fortunato Galtieri and Jorge Isaac Anaya, was a member of the Third Military Junta that ruled Argentina between 1981 and 1982. Alongside Reynaldo Bignone and Omar Graffigna he was one of the last surviving members of the dictatorship.

In 1985, during the Trial of the Juntas, he was charged of acts of torture, extrajudicial killings, making false declarations, and kidnappings.

In 1989, he was sentenced to an eight-year prison term in the criminal proceedings that arose from the 1982 Falklands War, in which he had served as commander-in-chief of the Argentine Air Force. In 1990, he received a presidential pardon from Carlos Menem and was allowed to keep his military rank.

In 2003, the Spanish justice system sought his extradition in order to stand trial in Spain for crimes against humanity committed during the dictatorship. Initially the government of Spanish Prime Minister José María Aznar ruled the extradition inadmissible but, in 2005, the Supreme Court overturned that decision and ordered extradition proceedings to go ahead.

== Personal life ==
Basilio Arturo Ignacio Lami Dozo was born in the province of Santiago del Estero to immigrants from Syria and Lebanon who had come to the Republic of Argentina before the fall of the Ottoman Empire after the World War. He died on 1 February 2017, on his 88th birthday.

Military offices
Preceded by Omar Graffigna	Commander-in-Chief of the Argentine Air Force; 1981–1982	Succeeded by Augusto Hughes
