= Trial of the Juntas =

1985 judicial trial in Argentina

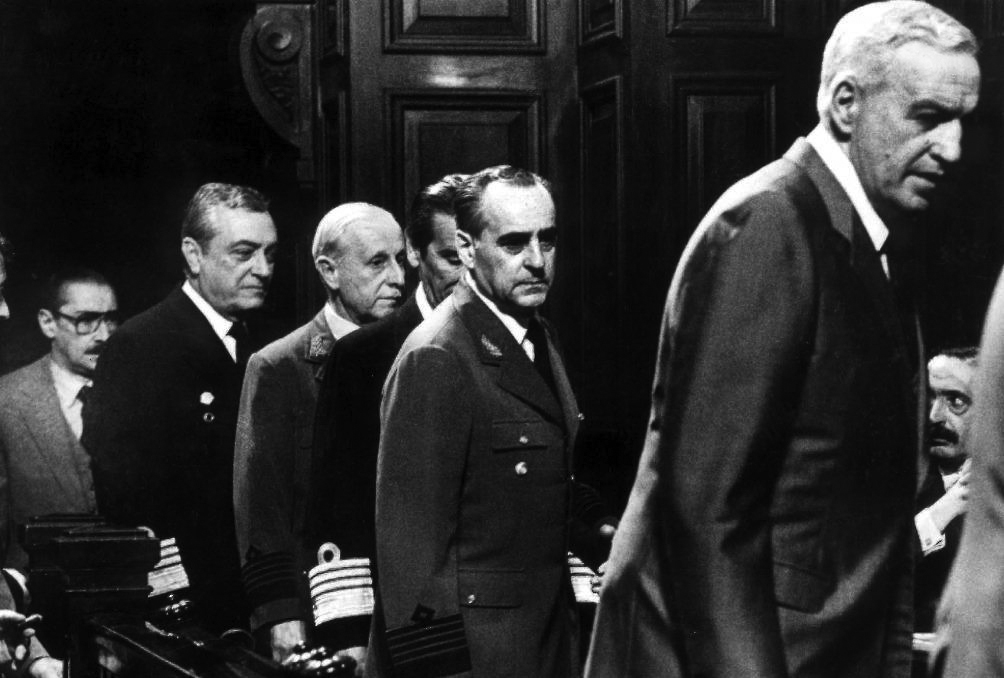
Trial of the military juntas on April 22, 1985; the accused military officers enter the courtroom.

The Trial of the Juntas (Spanish: Juicio a las Juntas) was the judicial trial of the members of the de facto military government that ruled Argentina during the dictatorship of the Proceso de Reorganización Nacional (el Proceso), which lasted from 1976 to 1983. It is so far the only example of such a large scale procedure by a democratic government against a former dictatorial government of the same country in Latin America.

The Trial of the Juntas began on 22 April 1985, during the presidential administration of Raúl Alfonsín, the first elected government after the restoration of democracy in 1983. The main prosecutors were Julio César Strassera and his assistant Luis Moreno Ocampo (who would go on to become the first Chief Prosecutor of the International Criminal Court). The trial was presided over by a tribunal of six judges: León Arslanián, Jorge Torlasco, Ricardo Gil Lavedra, Andrés D'Alessio, Jorge Valerga Aráoz, and Guillermo Ledesma.

Those on trial were: Jorge Rafael Videla, Emilio Eduardo Massera, Roberto Eduardo Viola, Armando Lambruschini, Orlando Ramón Agosti, Omar Graffigna, Leopoldo Galtieri, Jorge Anaya and Basilio Lami Dozo. Videla, Massera, Viola, Lambruschini, and Agosti were convicted. Graffigna, Galtieri, Anaya, and Lami Dozo were acquitted.

== Background ==
The dictatorship was a series of several military governments under four military juntas. The fourth junta, before calling for elections and relinquishing power to the democratic authorities, enacted a Self-Amnesty Law on April 18, 1983, as well as a secret decree that ordered the destruction of records and other evidence of their past crimes.

== Preparation ==
Three days after his inauguration, on 13 December 1983, President Alfonsín signed Decree No. 158, which mandated the initiation of legal proceedings against the nine military officers of the first three juntas, but not the fourth (ruled by General Reynaldo Bignone). The National Commission on the Disappearance of Persons was established two days later to collect testimonies from thousands of witnesses, and presented 8,960 cases of forced disappearances to the president on 20 September 1984. Following the refusal of a military court to try former junta members, Alfonsín established a National Criminal Court of Appeals for the purpose on 14 October.

== Proceedings ==
This trial, which officially began on 22 April 1985, is so far the only example of such a large scale procedure by a democratic government against a former dictatorial government of the same country in Latin America. It was the first major trial held for war crimes since the Nüremberg Trials in Germany and the International Military Tribunal for the Far East in Tokyo following World War II, and the first to be conducted by a civilian court. It succeeded in prosecuting the crimes of the juntas, which included kidnapping, torture, forced disappearance, and murder of an estimated 8,000 to 9,000 people during what was called the Dirty War against political dissidents. Opposition to the trial was largely limited to critical commentary by politicians, lawyers, and media figures sympathetic to the dictatorship. Some protests became violent: during the sentencing phase of the trial, 29 bomb threats were made to several Buenos Aires schools, and a number of bombs were detonated in key government installations, including the Ministry of Defense. On October 25, President Alfonsín declared a 60-day state of emergency.

Prosecutors presented 709 cases, of which 280 were heard. A total of 833 witnesses testified during the cross-examination phase, which lasted until 14 August. Witnesses included former President Alejandro Lanusse, writer Jorge Luis Borges, Estela Barnes de Carlotto, President of Grandmothers of the Plaza de Mayo; "Night of the Pencils" survivor Pablo Díaz; Patricia M. Derian, Assistant Secretary of State for Human Rights in the Carter Administration; Dutch jurist Theo van Boven, and renowned forensic anthropologist Clyde Snow.

Closing arguments were heard on September 18. Chief prosecutor Strassera concluded by declaring that:

I wish to waive any claim to originality in closing this indictment. I wish to use a phrase that is not my own, because it already belongs to all the Argentine people. Your Honors: Never again! (¡Nunca más!)

Chief Prosecutor Julio César Strassera reads closing arguments.

== Sentencing ==
Sentencing was read on 9 December: General Jorge Videla and Admiral Emilio Massera were sentenced to life imprisonment, General Roberto Viola: seventeen years, Admiral Armando Lambruschini: eight years, General Orlando Agosti: four and a half years.

Omar Graffigna, Leopoldo Galtieri, Jorge Anaya and Basilio Lami Dozo were acquitted, though the latter three were concomitantly court martialed for malfeasance in waging the Falklands War of 1982. Charges against 600 others were brought to court, but these lawsuits were hampered by the Full Stop Law of 1986, which limited suits to those indicted within 60 days of the law's enactment, and the Law of Due Obedience of 1987, which effectively halted most remaining trials of Dirty War perpetrators.

== Aftermath ==
Between 1989 and 1990, President Carlos Menem pardoned the men who had been sentenced or court-martialed. President Néstor Kirchner obtained an Argentine Supreme Court ruling permitting extraditions in cases of crimes against humanity in 2003, and that same year the Congress repealed the Full Stop Law. In 2005 the Supreme Court ruled that the 1986 and 1987 laws shielding officers accused of crimes were unconstitutional.

On 6 September 2006, Judge Norberto Oyarbide ruled that the pardons granted by President Menem were unconstitutional. On 25 April 2007, a federal court struck down Videla's presidential pardon and restored his convictions for human rights abuses.

In 2006, the government tried Miguel Etchecolatz, the first to be prosecuted of potentially 600 defendants. Witnesses and the judges were threatened, and immediately after the sentencing, Julio Jorge López disappeared. A victim of state violence and witness for the prosecution, he was feared dead and has never been found.

== Archives ==
The original video tapes of the trial have been in Norway since 1988. All of the Trial's judges traveled to Oslo on April 25 of that year with 147 VHS tapes which were given to the Norwegian Parliament in order to keep them safe and avoid any commercial use. They are kept next to the original text of the Constitution of Norway.

== See also ==
- Ley de Obediencia Debida
- Ley de Punto Final
- Carapintadas
- CONADEP
- Greek junta trials
- Argentina, 1985, a film about the trial
