= Jorge Anaya =

Argentine admiral (1926–2008)

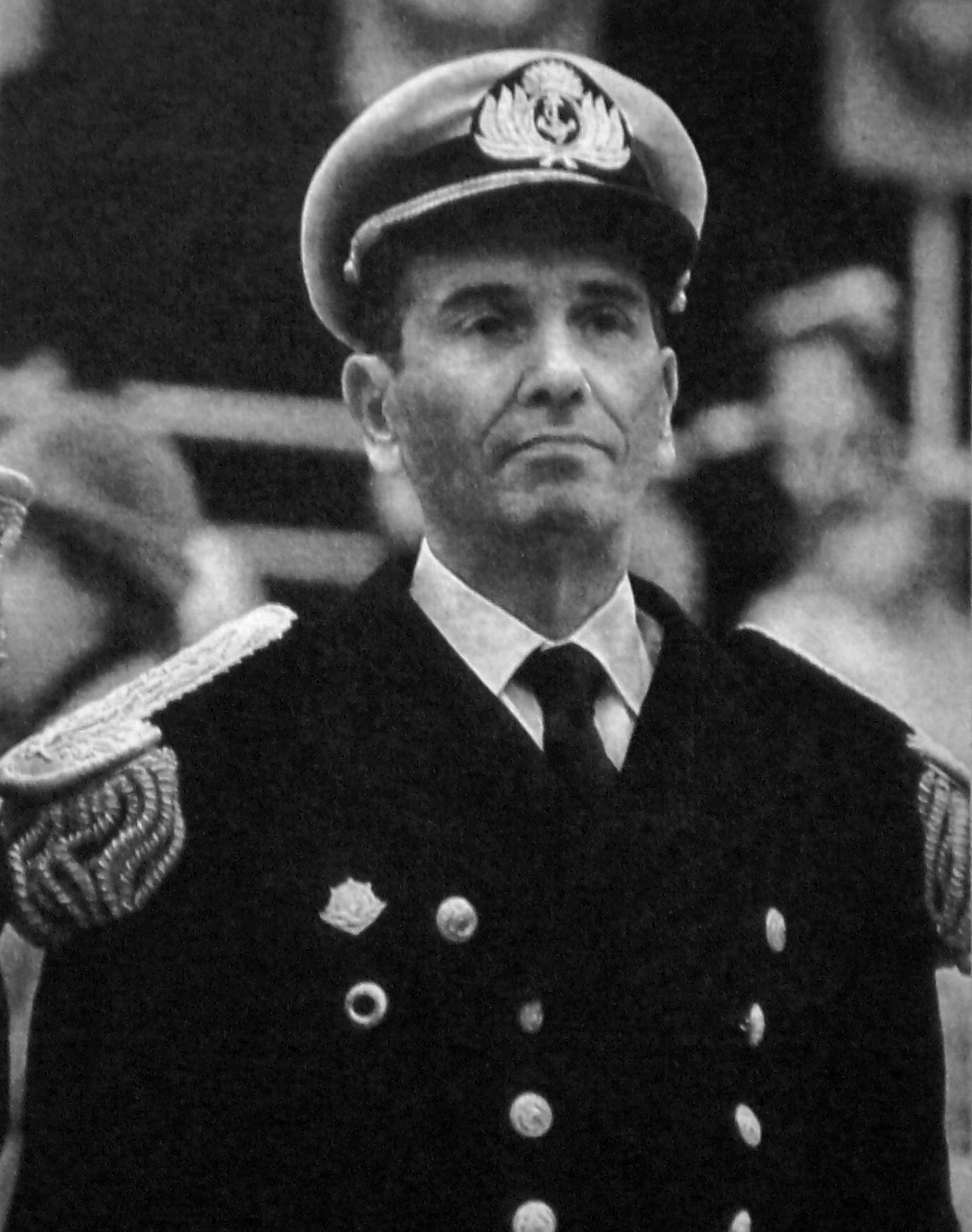
- Anaya in 1976
- Born: 27 September 1926; Bahia Blanca, Argentina
- Died: 9 January 2008 (aged 81); Buenos Aires, Argentina
- Military career
- Allegiance: Argentina
- Branch: Argentine Navy
- Service years: 1947–1982
- Rank: Admiral
- Units: Missile Frigate Division
- Conflicts: Falklands War

Admiral Jorge Isaac Anaya (27 September 1926 – 9 January 2008) was an Argentine admiral and Commander-in-Chief of the Argentine Navy. He was born in Bahía Blanca, in the province of Buenos Aires. He participated in the right-wing military dictatorship known as the National Reorganisation Process (1976–1983) and, along with Leopoldo Fortunato Galtieri and Basilio Lami Dozo, was a member of the Third Military Junta that ruled Argentina between 1981 and 1982. He was the main architect and supporter of a military solution for the long-standing claim over the Falkland Islands that led to the Falklands War (Spanish: Guerra de las Malvinas).

== Career ==
In 1955, Ship-of-the-Line Lieutenant Anaya participated in the coup against president Juan Perón. He was known to torture dissidents and new conscripts, and was recruited by the CIA for a covert anti-Communist programme in 1962.

He later served as Argentina's naval attaché in London, United Kingdom between 1964 and 1967. He commanded an anti-submarine Frigate between 1967 and 1970, a Destroyer Escort squadron between 1970 and 1972, and a guided missile frigate squadron between 1972 and 1974. Between 1974 and 1976, he was the chief of the Naval Police and Naval Intelligence.

In 1976, during the first part of the new military regime, Anaya was Chief of Naval Operations.

In December 1981, there was a change in the dictatorship bringing to office a new junta headed by General Leopoldo Galtieri. Anaya then, as commander-in-chief of the navy, ordered Vice-Admiral Juan Lombardo to create a plan to seize the Falkland Islands which both presented to the new acting president.

During the 1982 war, he devised and commanded Operation Algeciras, in which Argentine commandos were to sabotage a Royal Navy warship harboured in Gibraltar; the plan was thwarted at the last minute when communications were intercepted.

In the 1985 Trial of the Juntas, he was acquitted of charges of kidnapping, torture, enslavement, concealing the truth, usurpation of power, and false declarations.

In 1997, the Spanish judge Baltasar Garzón requested the arrest and extradition of 45 members of the Argentine military, and one civilian, for crimes of genocide, state terrorism, and torture committed during the "Dirty War" period of the de facto regime, including Anaya. The request was denied on several occasions by the democratically elected Argentine government, which argued that it was inadmissible on grounds of inapplicable jurisdiction.

On 27 July 2003, by means of Decree 420/03, President Néstor Kirchner amended the criteria under which the extraditions had been refused, ordering that the legal proceedings requested by the Spanish courts go ahead and thus enabling the extraditions to proceed.

In August 2003, Spanish Prime Minister José María Aznar ordered the cessation of the extradition proceedings for crimes committed in Argentina under the de facto regime. That decision was later overturned by the Supreme Court in 2005, which ordered that Garzón's requested extraditions continue. In November 2006, while waiting to be interrogated by an examining magistrate, Anaya suffered a heart attack and was rushed to the naval hospital; he remained under house arrest after his discharge from hospital, but was never deemed fit enough to stand trial.

He died on 9 January 2008 while under house arrest on charges of human rights violations.

== Sources ==
Translated, in part, from the corresponding article on the Spanish-language Wikipedia.
