= Emilio Eduardo Massera =

Argentine naval officer (1925–2010)

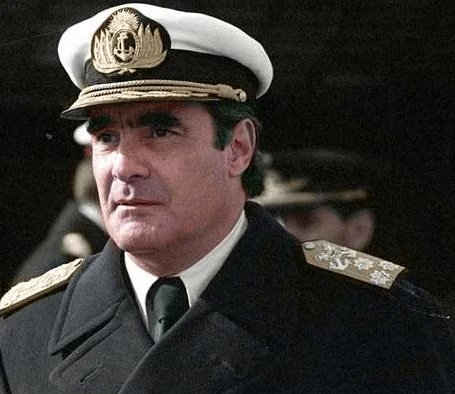
- Born: 19 October 1925; Paraná, Entre Ríos, Argentina
- Died: 8 November 2010 (aged 85); Buenos Aires, Argentina
- Spouse: Delia Vieyra
- Children: 5
- Military career
- Allegiance: Argentina
- Branch: Argentine Navy
- Service years: 1946–1978
- Rank: Admiral (pre-1991 epaulette)
- Known for: Leader of the Military Junta from 24 March 1976 until 29 March 1976 with Jorge Rafael Videla and Orlando Ramón Agosti

Emilio Eduardo Massera (19 October 1925 – 8 November 2010) was an Argentine Naval military officer and a leading participant in the Argentine coup d'état of 1976. In 1981, he was found to be a member of P2 (also known as Propaganda Due), a clandestine Masonic lodge involved in Italy's strategy of tension. Many considered Massera to have masterminded the junta's Dirty War against political opponents, which resulted in over 30,000 deaths and disappearances.

== Early life and military career ==
Emilio Massera was born in Paraná, Entre Ríos, to Paula Padula and Emilio Massera, grandson of immigrants from Switzerland. Massera entered Argentina's Naval Military School in 1942, obtaining his commission as a midshipman in 1946. In June 1955, as a Frigate Captain and one of the aids to the Minister or the Navy, he may have been involved in the bombing of Plaza de Mayo. After the Revolución Libertadora in 1955, Massera entered the Naval Information Service. During his career, he occupied different positions within the Navy, including command of the sail training ship ARA Libertad and command of the Sea Fleet in 1973. On 6 December 1973, Massera was designated General Commander of the Argentine Navy by Decree 552, signed by President Perón and Minister Angel F. Robledo (published on the Boletín Oficial de la República Argentina on 13 December), and, on 23 August 1974, he was promoted to full Admiral by Decree Nr. 612, signed by President María Estela Martínez de Perón and Minister José López Rega.. On 15 June 1974, he, along with the commanders of the Army and the Air Force, accompanied then-Vice President Isabel Perón to Italy and Spain, where she met with Francisco Franco.

== Military junta and resignation ==
Between 1976 and 1978, Admiral Massera was part, together with Jorge Rafael Videla and Orlando Ramón Agosti, of the military junta that deposed President Isabel Perón and ruled Argentina de facto during the National Reorganization Process. In September 1978, Massera stepped down from the office of Commander-in-Chief of the Navy and from his seat in the Military Junta. In 1981 he travelled to Bucharest, Romania.

== Trial and imprisonment ==
After the end of the dictatorship in 1983, he was tried for human rights violations and sentenced to life imprisonment and the loss of his military grade. However, on 29 December 1990, he was pardoned by then-President Carlos Menem. Massera was free until 24 November 1998, when he was imprisoned again pending an investigation of several instances of kidnapping and suppression of the identity of minors during his term, as well as orders of torture, execution, confinement in illegal detention centres, and drowning of prisoners.

He also explained the delivery of diplomatic passports to Licio Gelli, head of Propaganda Due, by stating that Gelli had "supported [us] in the struggle against subversion and the management of the image of Argentina abroad". Massera was an active participant in the lodge, promoting Gelli's appointment as an economic advisor to Argentina.

In 2004, he suffered a cerebrovascular accident caused by a burst aneurysm, and he was admitted to the Military Hospital of Buenos Aires. As a result of the stroke, Eduardo Massera was declared legally irresponsible because of insanity on 17 March 2005, and the cases against him were suspended.

== Death ==
Massera died on 8 November 2010 of a hemorrhagic stroke in the Hospital Naval of Buenos Aires. The funeral was kept in secrecy to avoid escraches, and was attended by only 10 people, without any representation of the government or the armed forces.

Military offices
Preceded by Carlos Álvarez	Commander-in-chief of the Argentine Navy; 6 September 1973 – 15 September 1978	Succeeded by Armando Lambruschini
