= Orlando Ramón Agosti =

Argentine general (1924–1997)

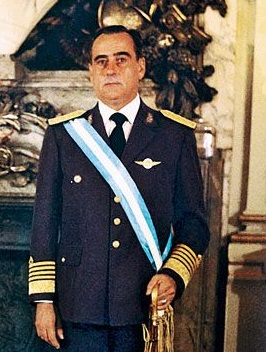
- Orlando Ramón Agosti in 1978
- Born: 22 August 1924; San Andrés de Giles
- Died: 6 October 1997 (aged 73); Buenos Aires, Argentina
- Military career
- Allegiance: Argentina
- Branch: Argentine Air Force
- Rank: Brigadier General (equivalent to 3-star or 4-star rank)

Orlando Ramón Agosti (22 August 1924 – 6 October 1997) was an Argentine general, Commander-in-Chief of the Argentine Air Force from 1976 to 1979. With General Jorge Rafael Videla, he ruled Argentina as part of the military junta between 1976 and 1981.

== Early life and education ==
Orlando Agosti was born in San Andres de Giles, a district of Buenos Aires, on Aug. 22, 1924, to parents of Italian descent. He graduated from the Military Aviation School in 1947. Soon after, he married Elba Esther Boccardo, and they had two children together.

== Career ==
He advanced quickly in the Air Force, and was selected for prominent positions. He was appointed as a military attaché to the United States and Canada. By 1976 he had been promoted to a Brigadier General.

== Military dictatorship ==
Appointed Commander in Chief of the Air Force on January 1, 1976, Agosti became one of the ruling junta under General Jorge Videla in 1976, after the military coup d'état of Isabel Perón's government. It carried out a counter-insurgency campaign of terrorist and political repression against those it loosely defined as leftist dissidents from 1976 to 1983, known as the Dirty War. This crushing of the opposition resulted in an estimated 30,000 "disappeared" and dead, according to human rights groups. Many victims were tortured in hundreds of secret detention centers that were set up around the country, often in military schools or installations. The Air Force was less directly involved than other parts of the armed forces in the political repression and terrorism.

An estimated 500,000 people fled the country into exile, to survive. These included many journalists, artists and writers, and intellectuals.

== Restoration of democracy, imprisonment and death ==
After the restoration of democracy, the former military leaders were tried for crimes committed under the dictatorship in the 1985 Trial of the Juntas. In 1985, he was accused of commanding 88 murders, 581 illegal arrests, 278 cases of torture (of which seven resulted in death), 110 thefts in aggravating circumstances, and 11 abductions of minors. The Air Force had played a smaller role in the state terrorism during the Dirty War than the other armed services. In December 1985, Agosti was found guilty of eight specific counts of torture and was sentenced to four and a half years in prison. The Argentine Supreme Court further reduced the sentence to three years and nine months.

The only one of the top-ranking junta to serve his complete sentence, Agosti was released from prison on May 9, 1989. In 1990, he and other former top officers were pardoned by President Carlos Saul Menem as part of a reconciliation process. His appeal in 1993 to have his military rank restored was not successful in the courts, with the Supreme Court of Argentina ultimately rejecting his military rank restoration effort that year as well. Orlando Ramón Agosti died in 1997.

Military offices
Preceded by Hector Fautario	General Commander of the Argentine Air Force; 1975–1976	Succeeded by Himself; As Commander-in-Chief of the Argentine Air Force
Preceded by Himself; As General Commander of the Argentine Air Force	Commander-in-Chief of the Argentine Air Force; 1976–1979	Succeeded by Omar Graffigna
