= Movimiento Judío por los Derechos Humanos =

Human rights organization in Argentina

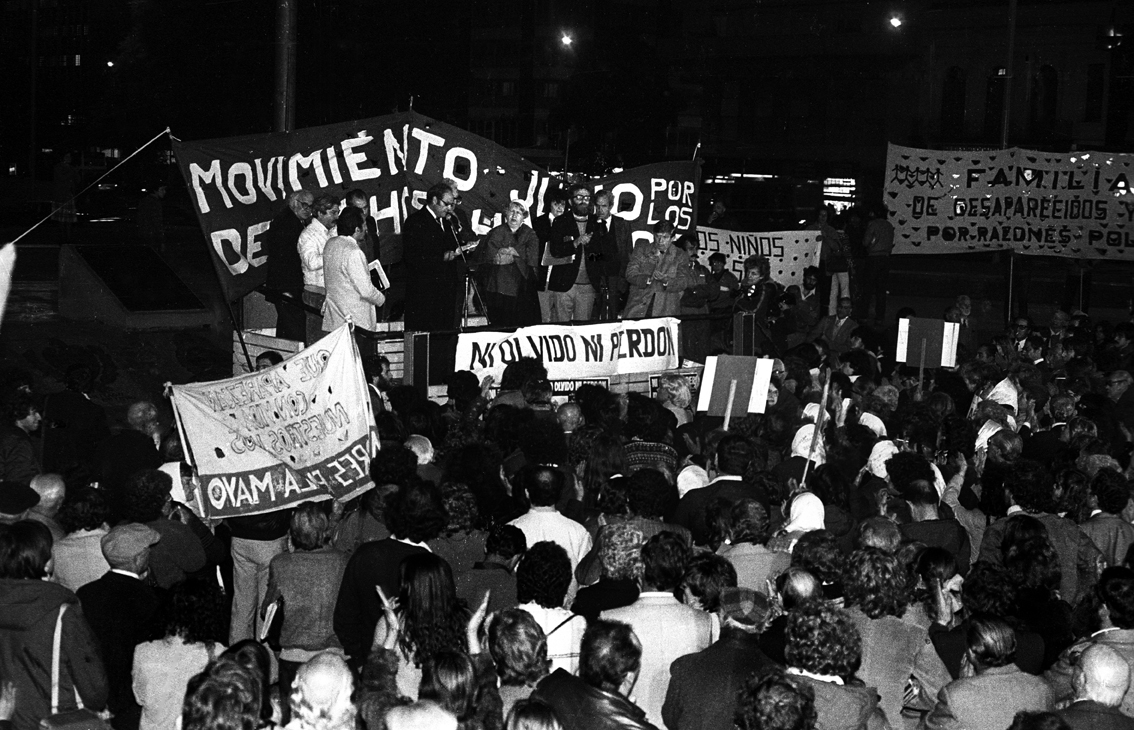
- A crowd of attendees watches speakers including Marshall Meyer and Herman Schiller during an MJDH event at the Obelisco de Buenos Aires, April 25, 1984.
- Abbreviation: MJDH
- Formation: August 19, 1983
- Founder: Marshall Meyer, Herman Schiller
- Type: Human rights organization
- Location: Argentina

The Movimiento Judío por los Derechos Humanos (literally Jewish Movement for Human Rights, abbreviated MJDH) was a human rights organization in Argentina. It was founded by Marshall Meyer and Herman Schiller on August 19, 1983.

The MJDH was one of nine major human rights organizations during the Dirty War. It was one of three such groups that were religious, along with the Movimiento Ecuménico por los Derechos Humanos and Servicio de Paz y Justicia. It played a key role in the fight for human rights in Argentina.

== Background ==
In 1978, rabbi Marshall Meyer of the synagogue Comunidad Bet El began encountering congregants whose relatives had been disappeared by the National Reorganization Process. These people had not found support at Delegación de Asociaciones Israelitas Argentinas (DAIA), and the mainstream Jewish community in Argentina was remaining silent because they feared government repression.

Major Jewish organizations such as DAIA, Asociación Mutual Israelita Argentina (AMIA), and the Organización Sionista Argentina called for community unity to discourage questioning of DAIA leadership, wanting there to be a single voice representing the Jewish community. Marshall Meyer decided to create the Movimiento Judío por los Derechos Humanos as a response to the demands of the unsupported relatives in his congregation.

== Objectives and members ==
Argentine Jews who joined the MJDH put themselves in danger by becoming exposed to government retaliation. Unlike the Mothers of the Plaza de Mayo or the Familiares de Desaparecidos y Detenidos por Razones Políticas, the group was largely not made up of people who had been personally affected by the disappearances.

The MJDH included religious dissidents from the Jewish community. Rabbi Meyer reached out to people from Seminario Rabínico Latinoamericano who disagreed with the military regime, and took advantage of their credibility to repudiate and delegitimize political repression, based on a philosophical and religious commitment to social justice.

The group began participating in marches near the end of 1982, although it was not officially founded until 1983.

== Activity ==
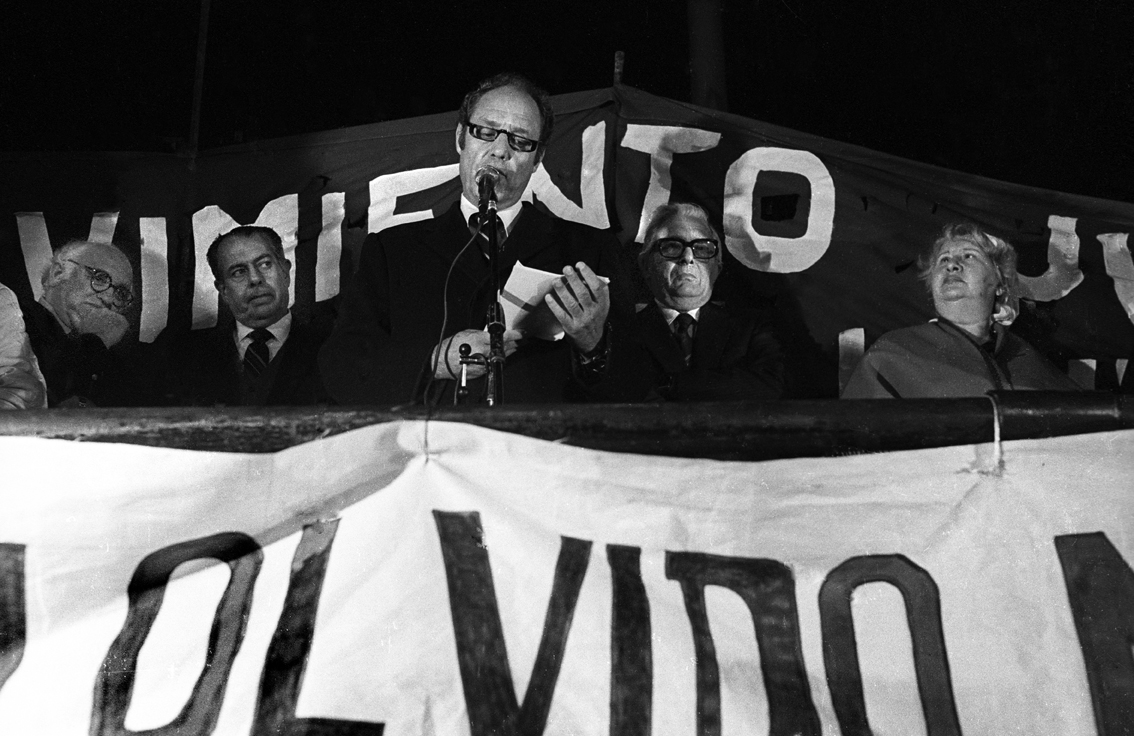
Jacobo Timmerman, Alfredo Bravo, Marshall Meyer and Renée Epelbaum on April 25, 1984 at a commemoration of the 41st anniversary of the Warsaw Ghetto Uprising against the Nazis, convened by the Movimiento Judío por los Derechos Humanos

The first public action of the MJDH was to participate in a march protesting an attempt by the military to pass an amnesty law for themselves in August 1983. This march was a success, and as a result, an independent MJDH rally was planned for October 1983 at the Obelisco de Buenos Aires. DAIA attempted to stop the rally, claiming it was antisemitic and criticizing speakers Hebe de Bonafini and Adolfo Pérez Esquivel, but thousands of people attended. The slogan of the rally was "Contra el Antisemitismo" ("Against Antisemitism").

After the election of Raúl Alfonsín as President of Argentina at the end of October 1983, the MJDH continued to organize events, often working with the Mothers of the Plaza de Mayo and other human rights groups. They supported democracy and called for punishment of the crimes of the National Reorganization Process. These efforts eventually led to the Trial of the Juntas and the imprisonment of key people involved in the dictatorship.

The MJDH also defended immigrants from Paraguay, Bolivia, and Peru who were persecuted by racist groups in Argentina.

== Awards and honors ==
In 2005 the Movimiento Judío por los Derechos Humanos received an award from Delegación de Asociaciones Israelitas Argentinas for work in defense of freedoms during and after the dictatorship, but rejected it. In a rejection speech on behalf of MJDH, Pedro Resels criticized DAIA (as well as AMIA and the Organización Sionista Argentina) for their conduct during the dictatorship, noting that the president of DAIA at the time claimed that dictatorial governments were better for Jews than democratic ones because they could control antisemitism more effectively. He also criticized the government of Israel for having sold weapons to the repressive Argentine government.

== See also ==
- History of the Jews in Argentina
- Marshall Meyer
- Permanent Assembly for Human Rights
