= Herman Schiller =

Argentine journalist

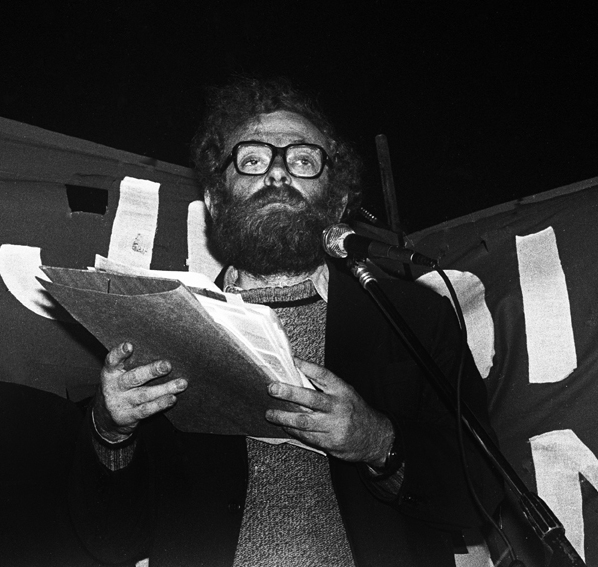
- Schiller speaks at a Movimiento Judío por los Derechos Humanos event at the Obelisco de Buenos Aires on 25 April 1984
- Occupation: Journalist
- Organization(s): Nueva Presencia; Movimiento Judío por los Derechos Humanos; Memoria Activa

Herman Schiller is an Argentine journalist. He was the editor-in-chief of Nueva Presencia, an Argentine Jewish newspaper, from its founding in 1977 until 1987. He also co-founded the Movimiento Judío por los Derechos Humanos with rabbi Marshall Meyer in August 1983, and was later involved in the creation of Memoria Activa. He hosted a radio program called Memoria y realidad ("Memory and reality") on FM Jai until it was cut in 1999.

Schiller has also been politically active in left-wing groups, and ran twice for deputy mayor of Buenos Aires, in 2000 and 2003, both times in the United Left ticket.

== Nueva Presencia ==
With Schiller as editor-in-chief, the Jewish newspaper Nueva Presencia was one of the only publications that advocated for human rights during the Dirty War and the National Reorganization Process. It expressed support for the Mothers of the Plaza de Mayo, setting it apart from the Delegación de Asociaciones Israelitas Argentinas, and put photos of the group on its cover. The publication additionally criticized the administration of Israeli Prime Minister Menachem Begin and supported Palestinians. It was accused of antisemitism by other Jewish publications including the Sephardi magazine La Luz and the Haredi publication La Voz Judía.

In 1981, the presses that produced Nueva Presencia were bombed twice, but Schiller did not tone down his criticism of the National Reorganization Process.

Schiller left the newspaper in 1987, and Nueva Presencia ceased publishing in 1993.

In November 2007, the legislature of Buenos Aires honored the publication "for its commitment to human rights and struggle against the recent military dictatorship". Schiller gave a speech at the unveiling of a plaque at the former editorial offices of Nueva Presencia on 9 December 2008, describing it as having been dedicated "to taking up the revolutionary tradition of Jewish workers".

== Movimiento Judío por los Derechos Humanos ==
Schiller co-founded the Movimiento Judío por los Derechos Humanos with Rabbi Marshall Meyer in August 1983. The organization denounced the National Reorganization Process despite the risk that was involved in doing so.

== Memoria y realidad ==
Schiller's radio program Memoria y realidad was initially broadcast four days per week for two hours each day. In 1999, it was first cut to a single hour per day and then ended entirely by the management of FM Jai, the Jewish broadcaster in Buenos Aires that hosted the program. The termination of the program was presented as a business decision, but may have been influenced by political factors; Schiller did not support Carlos Menem's government and was critical of Israeli government policies. Several hundred supporters of Schiller and Memoria y realidad listeners protested the cut. Members of the Buenos Aires legislature unsuccessfully asked FM Jai to reinstate the program. The legislature allowed Schiller to continue the program with one-hour broadcasts on Saturday nights on Radio Ciudad, an AM radio broadcaster supported by the city's government.
