= Nueva Presencia (publication) =

Argentine Jewish newspaper

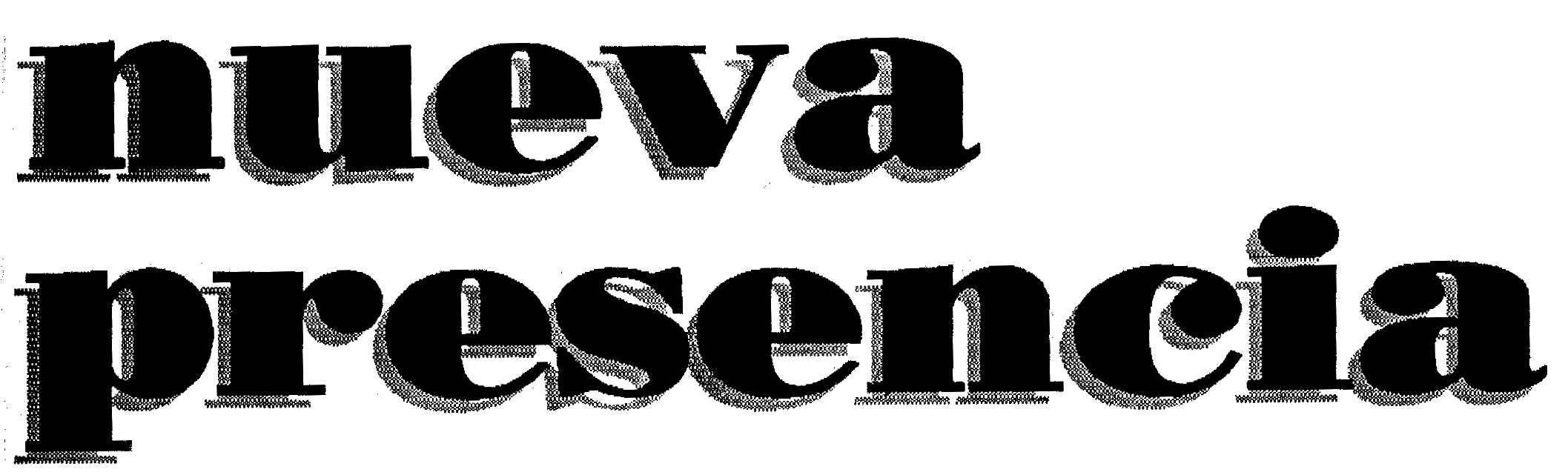
- Type: Weekly
- Editor-in-chief: Herman Schiller
- Founded: 1977
- Ceased publication: 1993
- Language: Spanish
- Headquarters: Buenos Aires, Argentina

Nueva Presencia was an Argentine Jewish newspaper in Buenos Aires. It was published weekly from 1977 until 1987 with Herman Schiller as the founding editor-in-chief, and continued to be published after Schiller left until its last issue in 1993. It was the first publication that advocated for human rights during the Dirty War and National Reorganization Process, and it regularly criticized the government.

== Activity ==
Nueva Presencia was the first and one of the only publications to advocate for human rights during the Dirty War and the National Reorganization Process. It regularly criticized the Argentine military government. It additionally expressed support for the Mothers of the Plaza de Mayo, setting it apart from the Delegación de Asociaciones Israelitas Argentinas, and put photos of the group on its cover.

The publication criticized the administration of Israeli Prime Minister Menachem Begin and supported Palestinians. It was accused of antisemitism by other Jewish publications including the Sephardi magazine La Luz and the Haredi publication La Voz Judía.

In 1981, the presses that produced Nueva Presencia were bombed twice, but Schiller did not tone down his criticism of the National Reorganization Process.

Schiller left the newspaper in 1987, and Nueva Presencia ceased publishing in 1993.

== Award by Buenos Aires legislature ==
In November 2007, the legislature of Buenos Aires honored the publication "for its commitment to human rights and struggle against the recent military dictatorship". Schiller gave a speech at the unveiling of a plaque at the former editorial offices of Nueva Presencia on December 9, 2008, describing it as having been dedicated "to taking up the revolutionary tradition of Jewish workers".
