= Schoklender scandal =

The Schoklender Scandal refers to the claims under which Sergio Schoklender and other people were involved in the alleged embezzlement of funds, provided by the State to be allocated to social housing project of "Mission: Shared Dreams", organized by the Mothers of the Plaza de Mayo and created by Sergio Schoklender.

== People involved ==
- Sergio Schoklender gained notoriety for killing his parents along with his brother Pablo Schoklender in May 1981. As a result of the crime was sentenced to life imprisonment. While in prison he started to work in human right activism where he met with Hebe de Bonafini and since he began in 1995 before being released from prison, to work at the Foundation Mothers of the Plaza de Mayo. He became the leader of the foundation and Bonafini's right hand, he split from the foundation on May 8, 2011.
- Pablo Schoklender, the author of the double murder, joined the Foundation in 2001 working in administration. He replaced his brother when he left the foundation, and soon had to leave the company himself, as he was investigated for an alleged transfer of funds to the firm Antarctica Argentina SA in 2009.
- Meldorek SA, a company that was contracted by the Foundation to build social housing using polystyrene panels manufactured by them. After an initial refusal, Schoklender recognized that he holds 90% of its shares. The company was founded in 2003 and in 2009 it was capitalized. Before its purchase by Schoklender the company wasn't working well but seemed for the purchase of particular goods. Justice now investigates what property was being sold Meldorek.
- Alejandro Gotkin, partner of Sergio Schoklender and president of Meldorek SA Antarctica and Argentina SA, the company from which Sergio Schoklender purchased 12 estate in the town of Jose Carlos Paz in Buenos Aires, and of the other firms investigated for misappropriation of funds.
- Gustavo Serventich, holds 10% of the shares of SA Meldorek and was Schoklender's pilot, who in 2010 connected with the then owner of the firm, a financier who needed a place to hold his assets, including two planes.

== Scandal ==
On May 8, 2011 Sergio Schoklender dissociated himself from the Foundation Mothers of Plaza de Mayo. His version was that he resigned because the work was not compatible with their personal projects while other sources reported that Hebe de Bonafini fired him for reasons relating to fund management. These facts were made public on May 25 and began an investigation to determine the alleged diversion of public funds given to the Foundation Mothers of Plaza de Mayo for the construction of social housing in the context of the Mission Shared Dreams.

With no official information, on the funds that the government gives to the Mothers of plaza de mayo. Only for housing schemes the unofficial calculations estimate that the total amount transferred varies between 150 and 300 million since 2006. Schoklender denied that the mothers have received $300 million. But he gave no details of how much he received. Bonafini Foundation also has a national university, a radio and print.

=== Sergio Schoklender's Heritage ===
The investigation seeks to determine the heritage of Schoklender. According to news reports he has two planes and a yacht under the Meldorek's company name, a home in Pilar and 12 property lots in Jose Carlos Paz neighbourhood. There are buildings on the streets Alvarez Thomas and Guevara of the Capital Federal and a network of companies in which it is not clear yet what's their participation.

In her first public appearance in the traditional round of discussion in the Pyramid of the Plaza de Mayo that every Thursday takes place the Mothers leader, Hebe de Bonafini said the allegations were "bullshit".

== See also ==
- Schoklender case
