= María Adela Gard de Antokoletz =

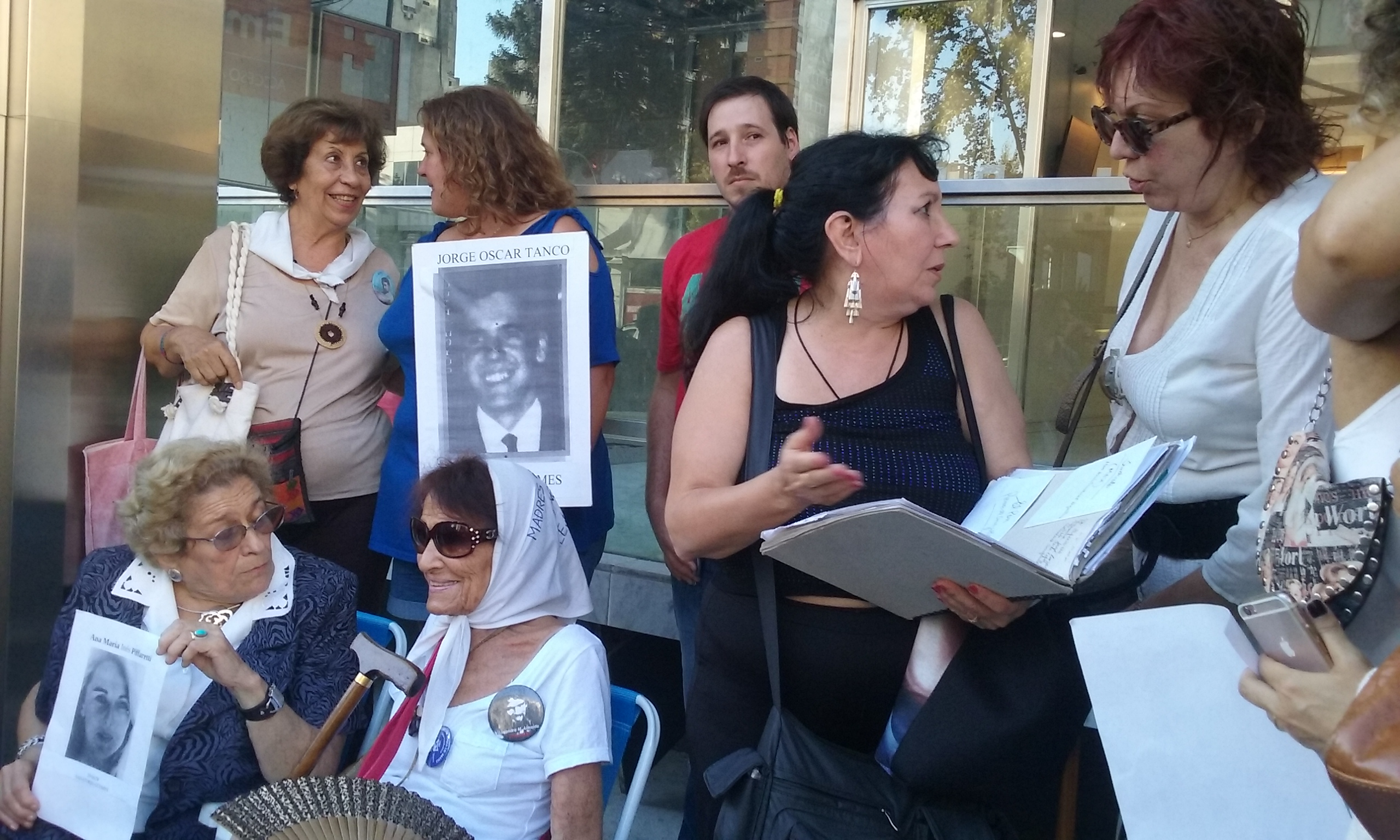
The presence of Tati Almeida and Maria Adela Ancoculate, from the mothers of the Mayo Square

María Adela Gard de Antokoletz (October 11, 1911 – July 23, 2002) was one of fourteen women who founded the Mothers of the Plaza de Mayo movement. Her son Daniel was abducted in November 1976. Later, when she was working for the provincial courts in Buenos Aires, she joined other mothers of missing children to found the Mothers of the Plaza de Mayo. This group was dedicated to finding out what had happened to their missing children. As part of this group, María Adela Gard de Antokoletz led protest marches every Thursday on Buenos Aires's Plaza de Mayo holding a picture of her son. Throughout her life, she received death threats because of her work, but she refused to forget what had happened to her son.

== Disappearance of Daniel ==
Antokoletz was from San Nicolás de los Arroyos. She had a son, Daniel, who was a lawyer and a professor. In his legal career, he defended political prisoners.

He was known internationally and was connected with the Organization of American States and the United Nations. However, due to the many disappearances of those who were considered a threat to the political regime in Argentina, his mother advised him to give up his work or leave the country to avoid confrontation with the government. In 1976, Daniel disappeared during Argentina's Dirty War, which lasted from 1976 until 1983. Antokoletz had no idea what happened to her son, and unfortunately would never find out. During this time period in Argentina, thousands of political opponents either disappeared or were tortured and killed by the military dictatorship. Daniel's disappearance, along with the disappearances of thousands of other sons and daughters, led Antokoletz and a group of mothers to seek information about the location of their missing children and question the role of the government in the disappearance of their loved ones.

== Participation in the Mothers of the Plaza de Mayo ==
In April 1977, María Adela Gard de Antokoletz and thirteen other women met in the Plaza de Mayo in Buenos Aires. They started by holding vigils in the Plaza dedicated to their missing children in order to show the government that they would not give up trying to gain information about their lost sons and daughters. Through their actions they were able to bring attention from all over the world to those who had disappeared under the military dictatorship. As time went on, the women began to participate in protest marches to demand information about the disappearances. Antokoletz led many of these marches on Thursday afternoons, and she always marched holding a picture of her son. This founding group of women, as well as the many women who would later join them in their fight for justice became known as the Mothers of the Plaza de Mayo.

The Mothers of the Plaza de Mayo have been a significant part of the human rights movement in Argentina. Their fight started out as a desire to find out what happened to their missing children, but it turned into a fight for the right of a dignified life for all people. The group represented a push back against the fear and silence that were being imposed on Argentine society during the Dirty War. As a founding member of the Mothers of the Plaza de Mayo, Antokoletz played a significant role in the group and was elected vice president. As the divorced wife of a diplomat, she was able to enjoy a higher standard of living than many of the other mothers. In 1981, she and Hebe de Bonafini travelled to the United States of America as representatives for the Mothers of the Plaza de Mayo. While in the United States, the women received a peace prize on behalf of the Mothers from the Rothko Ecumenical Movement.

In addition to traveling to the United States, these two women also traveled to Europe, where they were received very well. While in Europe, they were able to meet with Prime Minister Felipe González of Spain and President François Mitterrand of France. They also visited Pope John Paul II in Rome due to the fact that the Mothers felt betrayed by the Catholic Church in Argentina and they felt the need to appeal to the Pope for help.

The Mothers of the Plaza de Mayo eventually split into two separate groups based on differences in opinion. Antokoletz was part of the Línea Fundadora, which means “Founding Line.” This group differed from the other faction of the Mothers of the Plaza de Mayo in that it did not want to be a radical opposition group, but instead wanted to be an interest group. As an interest group, they wanted to show support for the government, even though they did not agree with all of the government's decisions, and they wanted to work with the government to gain information rather than protesting against it. Despite these differences, the women continued to protest, even when democracy was put into place in Argentina. Antokoletz and the other mothers wanted the perpetrators to take responsibility for what had happened and to give them information about what had happened to their missing children. Unfortunately, those who had been convicted of war crimes were pardoned in 1994. The Mothers faced a lot of difficulty throughout their protests, and they were subjected to death threats and harassment, as well as attempts to silence them through arrests and murder. However, these women kept fighting for their children, and some, such as Antokoletz, continued to protest until they died.

== Views on disappearances ==
María Adela Gard de Antokoletz had her own views on the disappearances that took place in Argentina and what should be done to ensure that the disappearances permanently come to an end. She believed that the people who disappeared were taken by those in power because they had ideas and were trying to teach them to others, which could potentially make them a threat to the system. In response, a person spreading ideas went missing, and it seemed almost as if the person had never existed in the first place. Antokoletz believed that the point of this system of disappearances was a way for those in power to ensure that nothing changed among the people, which would allow them to remain in power.

Antokoletz also believed that the people who committed these awful crimes must be brought to justice in order for there to be peace in society. She felt that as long as the criminals went unpunished, it would send a signal to the guilty that they did not have to take responsibility for their actions and therefore could continue to do whatever they wanted. If this continued, she predicted that the people would continue to live in fear of the oppressive regime. Antokoletz had strong feelings about the Catholic Church. She felt that the people had been betrayed by the Church and that the “upper hierarchy” did not help the disappeared or their families and communities in times of need. She sincerely believed that if the Church had stepped in and taken action against the violence, many lives could have been saved.

María Adela Gard de Antokoletz promoted the idea that people should fight for their freedom. She said, “A society that does not fight for its rights becomes a sick society, a society that lives in fear and horror that it can happen again.” She was certain that the only way for people to escape from a repressive regime is to push back by demanding rights and justice. If this is not done, the society will constantly live with the fear that the atrocities of the past can be repeated in the future. Antokoletz kept working even in her old age to ensure that these horrible disappearances never happened again, because she felt that she owed it to the disappeared.

== Later life ==
Antokoletz remained active with the Mothers until her death in 2002. At the time of her death, she was ninety years old, making her the oldest member of the group. Sadly, she never learned the truth about what happened to Daniel, but it was assumed that he was thrown into the Rio de la Plata in Buenos Aires. After her death, her family prepared a death notice that listed Daniel as one of the mourners, but it also listed him as “missing.” However, the notice of her death was never printed because of the mention of her son. Antokoletz's last wish was that her ashes were to be scattered in the Rio de la Plata, and her wish was granted. Flowers were also thrown into the river to commemorate Antokoletz and all of the disappeared.
