= Shvedov =

Shvedov (Russian: Шведов) is a Russian masculine surname, its feminine counterpart is Shvedova. The surname is derived from the word швед (shved, meaning "a Swedish person") and literally means Swede's. It may refer to:

- Alexandr Shvedov (born 1973), Kazakhstani water polo goalkeeper
- Anastasiya Shvedova (born 1979), Belarusian, formerly Russian, pole vaulter
- Grigory Shvedov (born 1976), Russian human rights activist and journalist
- Natalia Shvedova (1916–2009), Russian lexicographer
- Yaroslava Shvedova (born 1987), Kazakhstani tennis player of Russian origin
