= Caucasian Knot =

Russian news website

- Founder: Grigory Shvedov
- Founded: 2001
- Language: English Russian
- Headquarters: Moscow
- Website: eng.kavkaz-uzel.eu

Caucasian Knot (Russian: Кавказский узел, romanized: Kavkazkii Uzel) is an online news site that covers the Caucasus region in English and Russian. It was established in 2001 and Grigory Shvedov is the editor-in-chief. It has a particular focus on politics and on human rights issues, including freedom of the press.

== History ==
In 2001 the site started out as a project related to the human rights organisation Memorial, but developed into a site for independent journalism.

In 2003 the Caucasian Knot launched its English-language site.

It is funded by a number of charitable organisations in the U.S. and Western Europe.

The site had a monthly readership of approximately 1.8 million in 2011.

== Projects ==
- "North Caucasus through the eyes of bloggers" (in partnership with the BBC Russian Service)
- "Maps of the peaceful Caucasus" (in cooperation with Yandex)
- "Weather in 49 cities of the Caucasus" (together with the laboratory for modeling the general circulation of atmosphere and climate at the Russian Hydrometeorological Center)
- Interviews with the Presidents of the North and South Caucasus republics (in partnership with the online publication "Gazeta.ru"):
  - interview with the President of Ingushetia Yunus-Bek Yevkurov
  - interview with the head of Dagestan Mukhu Aliyev
  - interview with President of South Ossetia Eduard Kokoity
  - interview with President of Abkhazia Sergei Bagapsh
  - interview with the head of North Ossetia Taimuraz Mamsurov

== Team ==
Caucasian Knot does not have any editorial offices, citing security risks. Grigory Shvedov operated from Moscow while many of the other reporters (approximately fifty) are spread around in the Caucasus area, including in Chechnya, Dagestan, and Azerbaijan. The reporters stay in contact via Google programs in a virtual office. Due to safety concerns, a number of the correspondents do not use their names.

== Murders and harassment of journalists ==
Russian human rights activist and journalist Natalya Estemirova contributed to Caucasian Knot before she was kidnapped and killed in Chechnya in 2009.

In 2009, Caucasian Knot launched a project together with the BBC named "North Caucasus through the eyes of bloggers".

The Caucasian Knot journalist Bella Ksalova was shot in the city of Cherkessk on July 25, 2010 by Arsen Abaikhanov.

Akhmednabi Akhmednabiev, who was deputy editor of the weekly paper Novoe Delo and also wrote for Caucasian Knot, was shot and killed in Makhachkala in 2013.

On April 16, 2016 Caucasian Knot correspondent Zhalaudi Geriyev was kidnapped by unknown security forces. He was accused of working against the authorities in Chechnya and was sentenced to three years prison for illegal transport and possession of large quantities of drugs.

To support the journalist, international human rights organizations made statements to recognize him as a political prisoner.

== Awards ==
In 2007, Caucasian Knot was awarded the Free Press of Eastern Europe award, which is given out jointly by the German charity ZEIT-Stiftung and the Norwegian free speech organisation Fritt Ord.

In 2009, Caucasian Knot was awarded with the Prize of the Russian Union of Journalists for defending the interests of the professional community.

The editor received the Dutch Geuzenpenning award in 2012 for his work with Memorial and Caucasian Knot.
