= Renée Slotopolsky de Epelbaum =

Argentine activist

Renée “Yoyi” Slotopolsky de Epelbaum
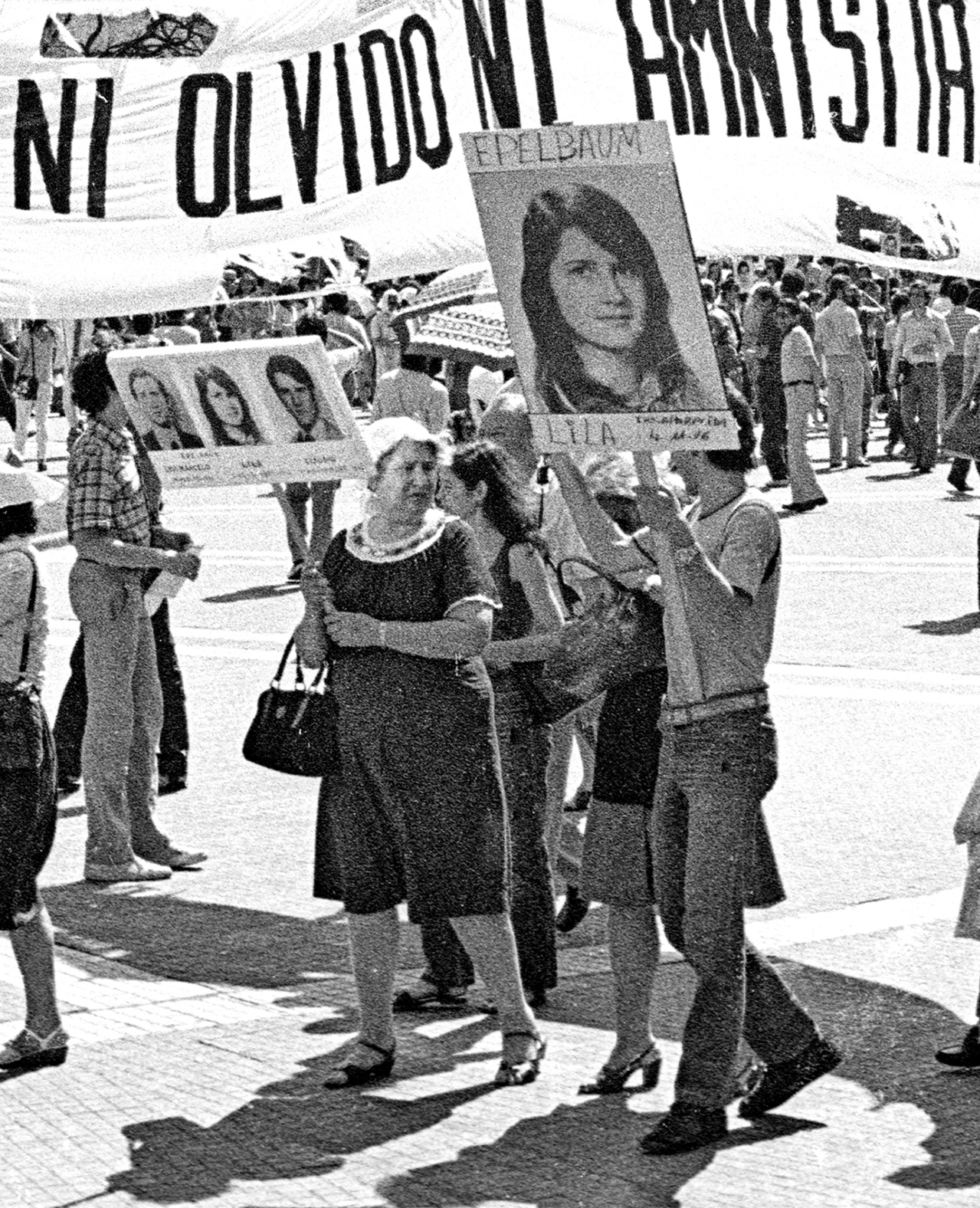
- Mother of Plaza de Mayo
- Born: June 15, 1920; Entre Ríos, Argentina
- Died: February 7, 1998 (aged 77); Buenos Aires, Argentina
- Known for: being one of the founders of the Mothers of the Plaza de Mayo association.
- Spouse: Raúl Epelbaum

Renée Slotopolsky de Epelbaum (June 15, 1920 – February 7, 1998), also known as Yoyi Epelbaum, was an Argentine human rights activist. She is known for being one of the founders of the Mothers of the Plaza de Mayo, an association of mothers of those disappeared during the military dictatorship known as National Reorganization Process that ruled Argentina between 1976 and 1983. She was also an early member of the Movimiento Judío por los Derechos Humanos.

== Disappearance of her children ==
One of her sons, Luis Marcelo (25), a medical student, was kidnapped on August 10, 1976, in Buenos Aires as he left the university. Claudio (23), a law student and Lila (20), a dancer, were sent on holiday to the city of Punta del Este in Uruguay, where they thought they would be safe. However, Argentine squads in cooperation with the Uruguayan regime followed them, and they were kidnapped on November 4, 1976.
