= Mirta Acuña de Baravalle =

Argentine activist (1925–2024)

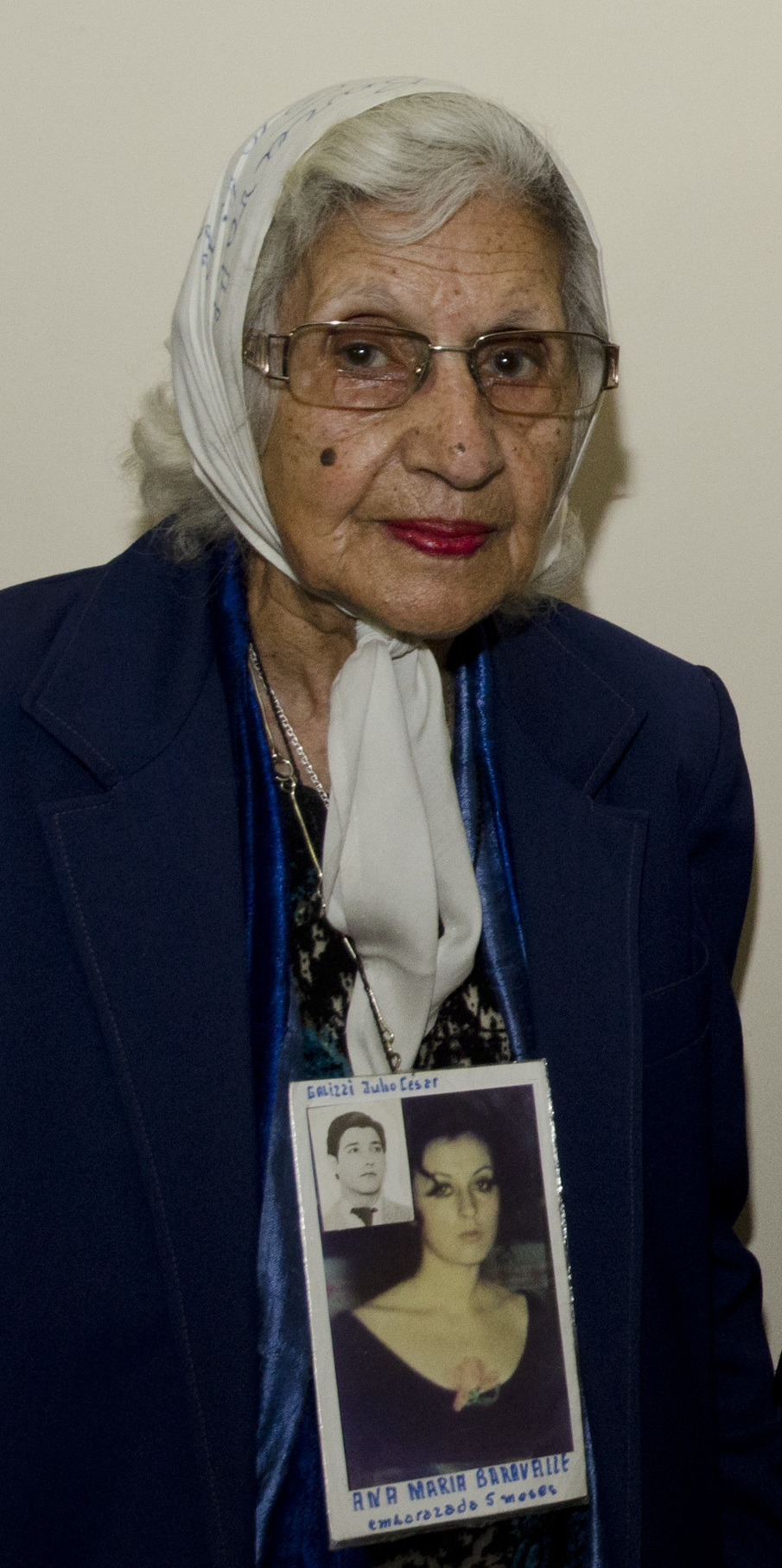
- Acuña de Baravalle in 2014
- Born: Mirta Acuña; 15 July 1925; Uribelarrea, Buenos Aires, Argentina
- Died: c. 1 November 2024 (aged 99)
- Resting place: La Chacarita Cemetery
- Occupation: Activist
- Years active: 1977–2024
- Spouse: Romildo Baravalle (died 1978)
- Children: 4

Mirta Acuña de Baravalle (born Mirta Acuña; 15 July 1925 – c. 1 November 2024) (Note: Acuña de Baravalle's death was announced at the start of 2 November 2024.) was an Argentine human rights activist who was one of the twelve founders of the Mothers of Plaza de Mayo and the Grandmothers of Plaza de Mayo associations.

== Biography ==
The Argentine coup d'état of 24 March 1976 established a terrorist regime that sought to "disappear" their political opponents. Neither another country, the Catholic Church, nor an international humanitarian organization, was willing to condemn the military regime's atrocities. The judicial system systematically rejected legal remedies.

Acuña de Baravalle's daughter, Ana María, who was five months pregnant at the time, and her son-in-law, Julio César, were among those arrested and "disappeared". The last news Acuña de Baravalle heard about her daughter was that she had given birth to a girl while in prison.

At the beginning of 1977, Acuña de Baravalle joined a group of mothers, fathers, and relatives of the disappeared who began to meet in the Plaza de Mayo as a form of nonviolent resistance. The proposal came from Azucena Villaflor, who was later murdered by the dictatorship. This group later became known as the Mothers of the Plaza de Mayo and she was one of its founders.

In October 1977, she received an invitation from Alicia Zubasnabar, another of the Mothers, to form a group of grandmothers who were looking for their missing grandchildren. She was one of the twelve founding women of Grandmothers of the Plaza de Mayo. Her daughter, son-in-law, and granddaughter are still missing.

In 1986, due to internal discrepancies, Mothers of Plaza de Mayo fractured. Acuña de Baravalle joined the sector called Mothers of the Plaza de Mayo Fundraiser Line.

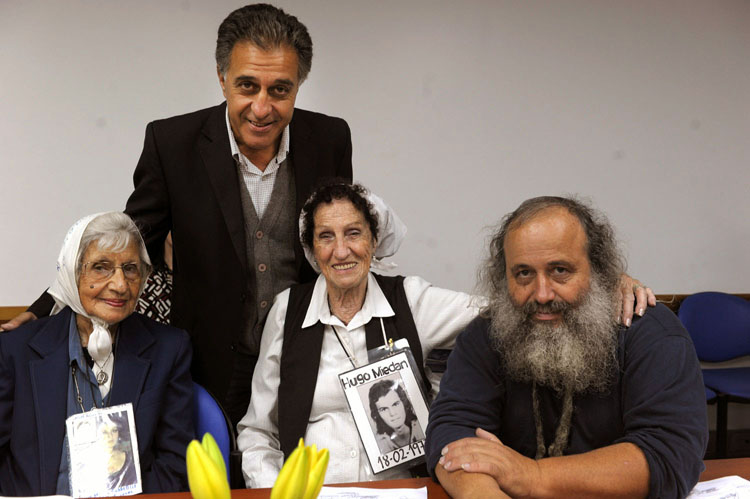
Acuña de Baravalle with the Mother of Plaza de Mayo Elia Espen and Enrique Fukman; stand-in Néstor Pitrola (PO-FIT) during a hearing for the dismissal of César Milani

Acuña de Baravalle's death was announced on 2 November 2024; she was 99.
