= Mercedes Colás de Meroño =

Spanish human rights activist (1925–2021)

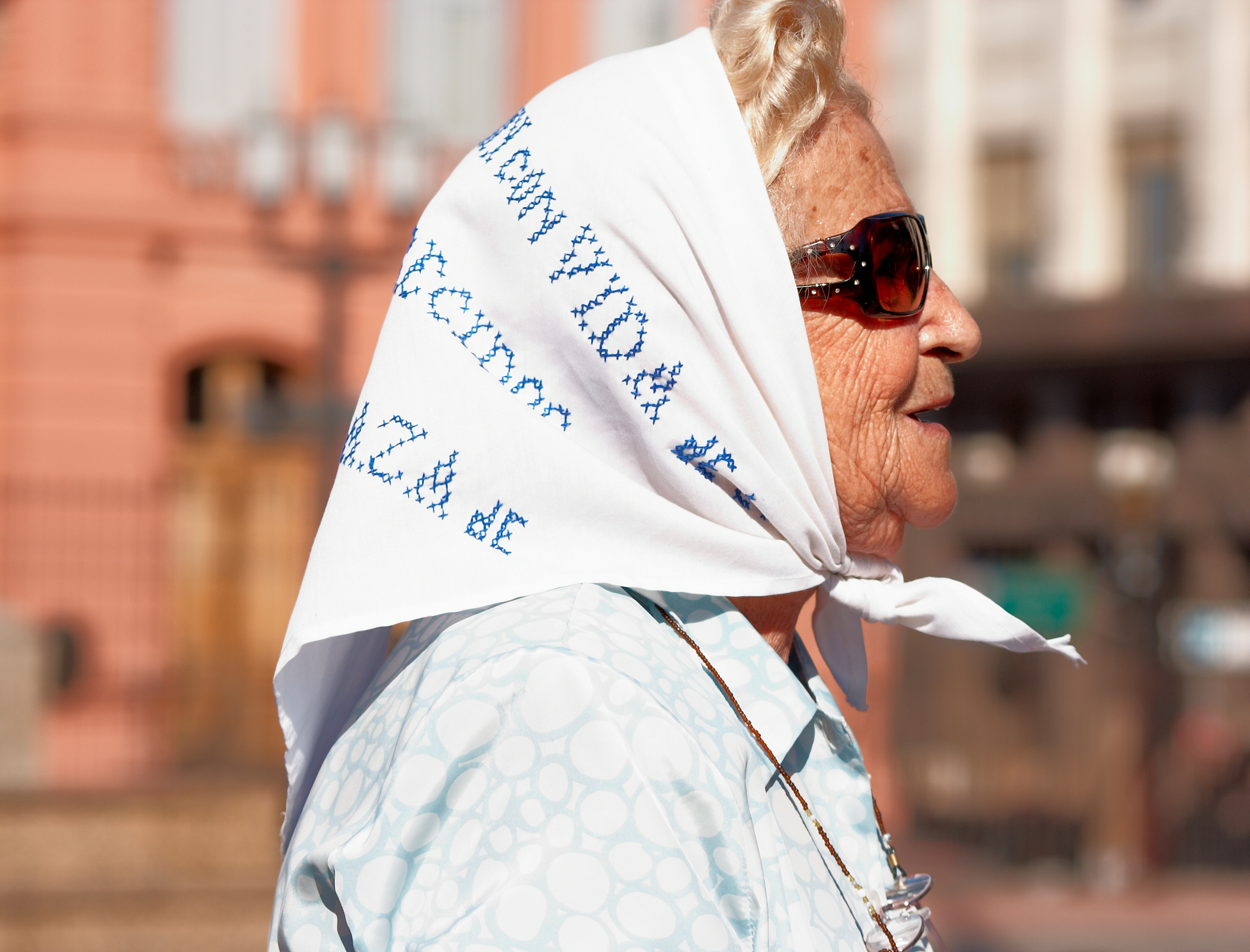
- Born: Mercedes Colás de Meroño; 11 July 1925; Buenos Aires, Argentina
- Died: 21 April 2021 (aged 95); Buenos Aires, Argentina
- Occupation: human rights activist

Mercedes Colás de Meroño (11 July 1925 – 21 April 2021), known as Porota, was an Argentine human rights activist. She was vice president of Mothers of the Plaza de Mayo.

Her father, José María Colás, was executed by firing squad during the Spanish Civil War.

Her daughter, Alicia Meroño, was among the desparecidos of Argentina, disappearing on January 5, 1978. Alicia's fate was still undetermined at the time of her mother's death.

Colás de Meroño died in Buenos Aires on 21 April 2021, aged 95.
