= Geuzenpenning =

Human rights award

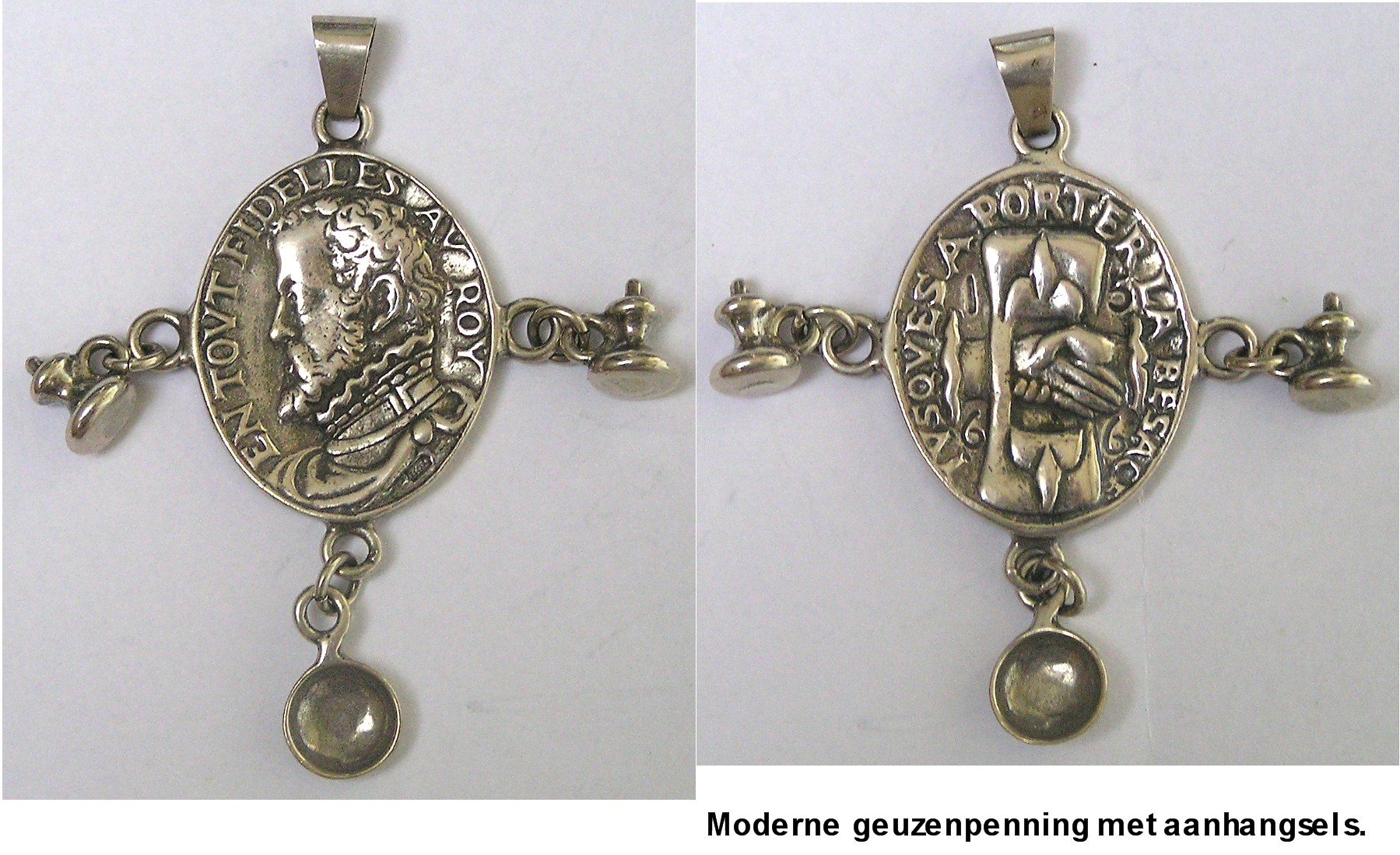
An image of the award

The Geuzenpenning ('Beggar Medal') is a Dutch award given to persons or organizations who have fought for democracy and against dictatorship, racism and discrimination. It has been awarded annually since 1987 in the city of Vlaardingen.

The Geuzenpenning is an initiative of the Geuzen Resistance 1940–1945 Foundation. The organization takes its name from the a resistance group called 'Geuzen' which was active during World War II around Vlaardingen, Maassluis and Rotterdam. The resistance group, in turn, took its name from the Geuzen (from French gueux 'beggars'), a collection of armed groups that fought the Spanish occupation of the Low Countries in the 16th century, during the Dutch Revolt. Fifteen of the WWII Geuzen were executed by German forces at the Waaldorp plain on 13 March 1941, along with three leaders of the Amsterdam February Strike. After the war, surviving members of the group started the foundation to honor the memory of their fallen comrades and the Geuzen ideals, to promote and maintain democracy in the Netherlands and to heighten global awareness of all forms of dictatorship, discrimination and racism.

== Recipients ==
The Geuzenpenning has been awarded to:

- 1987 – Amnesty International, Netherlands chapter
- 1988 – Queen Wilhelmina of the Netherlands (posthumously)
- 1989 – Stichting Februari 1941 (February 1941 Foundation)
- 1990 – Richard von Weizsäcker, president of West Germany
- 1991 – Bernard IJzerdraat, resistance fighter (posthumously) and László Tőkés, Romanian minister and revolutionary
- 1992 – Anne Frank Foundation
- 1993 – Max van der Stoel, UN inspector in Iraq and High Commissioner on National Minorities in Europe
- 1994 – Doctors without Borders, Netherlands chapter
- 1995 – Václav Havel, president of the Czech Republic
- 1996 – Harry Wu, Chinese dissident
- 1997 – Mothers of the Plaza de Mayo
- 1998 – Vera Chirwa (Malawi, Africa), Noel Pearson (Australia), Muchtar Pakpahan (Indonesia, Asia), Rosalina Tuyuc (Guatemala, Americas) and Sergei Kovalyov (Russia, Europe)
- 1999 – Human Rights Association (Turkey), Turkish human rights organization
- 2000 – Nataša Kandić (Serbia) and Veton Surroi (Albania/Kosovo), human rights activists
- 2001 – European Roma Rights Centre and the Dutch National Sinti Organisation
- 2002 – Asma Jahangir, Pakistani lawyer and women's rights advocate
- 2003 – Defence for Children International
- 2004 – Íngrid Betancourt, Colombian politician
- 2005 – Richard Gere on behalf of International Campaign for Tibet, an organization for human rights and democracy in Tibet
- 2006 – Haitham Maleh, Syrian human rights activist
- 2007 – Human Rights Watch
- 2008 – Martti Ahtisaari, former president of Finland and mediator of international conflicts and civil wars
- 2009 – Al Haq and B'Tselem, a Palestinian and an Israeli human rights organization respectively
- 2010 – Betty Bigombe, president of the Arcadia Foundation
- 2011 – Sima Samar, Afghan human rights activist, and the Armed forces of the Netherlands
- 2012 – Grigory Shvedov, Russian human rights activist and journalist
- 2013 – Radhia Nasraoui, Tunesian lawyer and human rights activist
- 2014 – Thomas Hammarberg, Swedish human rights activist
- 2015 – Free Press Unlimited
- 2016 – Migrant Offshore Aid Station
- 2017 – Alice Nkom and Michel Togué, lawyers and LGBT advocates from Cameroon
- 2018 – Girls Not Brides: The Global Partnership to End Child Marriage
- 2019 – Padre Alejandro Solalinde Guerra, Mexican human rights activist and priest
- 2020 – ACPRA, Saudi human rights organisation
- 2021 – Małgorzata Gersdorf, a Polish lawyer and former supreme court judge
- 2022 – Lawyers for Lawyers
- 2023 – Assistance Association for Political Prisoners of Burma
- 2024 – Laila Haidari, Afghan activist and restaurateur.
- 2025 – Ukraine 5 AM Coalition
- 2026 – Gergely Karácsony, Mayor of Budapest
