= CONAVIGUA =

Guatemalan human rights organization

The National Coordinator of Widows of Guatemala (Spanish: Coordinadora Nacional de Viudas de Guatemala), also known as CONAVIGUA, is a women-led organization that denounced and demanded justice for human rights violations against women in Guatemala. This movement was the first where indigenous women had formed their own organization in Guatemala. The CONAVIGUA organization was founded by Rosalina Tuyuc in 1988 amidst the Guatemalan Civil War by indigenous rural women who had experienced loss by the hands of this war. This includes women whose husbands, daughters, and sons had either "disappeared" or were killed by alleged authorities of Guatemala. Aside from looking for the "disappeared" and fighting for their rights, the main work of the CONAVIGUA women included supplying rural villages with economic aid and assistance where Mayan women operated the formation of food and craft cooperatives. This group of indigenous women worked on a national level as well as a local level to advocate for their loved ones who were taken from them as well as for their own rights. As one of the more prominent movements for women in Latin America, CONAVIGUA's legacy continues to remain persistent in Guatemala.

== History ==
The origins of the conflict that led to the formation of this movement first began hundreds of years prior, when Mayan civilization was colonized by the Spaniards transitioning to a new society. In 1821 Guatemala achieved independence, however, with this independence came a dictatorship with an economy fueled by agriculture, which benefitted off of the forced labor of indigenous and poor people. This changed in 1944 with the democratic election of President Jacobo Arbenz who passed laws and reforms which conflicted with the desires of international corporations. This led to the C.I.A. assisting in a coup in 1954 resulting in the replacement of president Jacob Arbenz with Castillo Armas.

In Castillo's rule he passed laws that inhibited illiterate Guatemalans from being able to vote and regressed previous reforms made by Jacobo Arbenz that benefited the indigenous and poor farmers of the region. This action caused a civil conflict between left-winged guerrilla groups and the military which lasted until 1996. During this conflict, indigenous men were often tortured or killed while indigenous women faced slavery and sexual assault by the military. This happened at the military outpost in Sepur Zarco where the women who survived these actions have gotten justice for the crimes committed by military men through the court systems in 2016. This civil war was one of the deadliest conflicts in its region and the lasting impact wars such as this can have on women remain. It was not until 1994 that the UN stepped into peace talks incorporating a coalition of women groups into said talks which eventually led to peace accords being signed by president Álvaro Arzú in 1996. This conflict that started in 1960 resulted in "more than 200,000 lives" being lost where "83 percent" of who were of indigenous Mayan descent, leaving 50,000 women as widows and over 500,000 children as orphans.

The widowing of indigenous women during this conflict and the atrocities committed by military men against indigenous women that led to the CONAVIGUA being formed in 1988.

== Founder ==
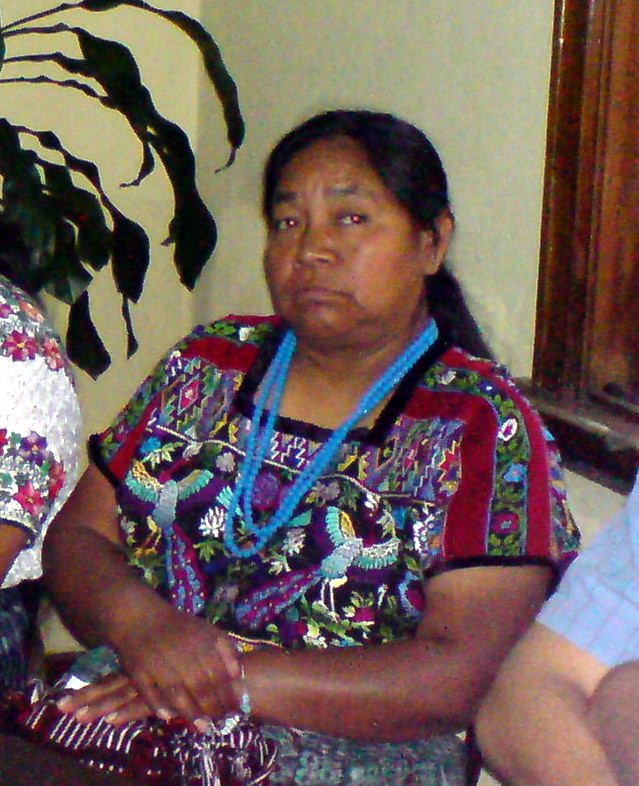
Rosalina Tuyuc

Rosalina Tuyuc was born in Chimaltenango, Guatemala, in 1956. At a young age, Tuyuc began her work with the Indigenous community as she aided underprivileged women who were not provided with the ability to further themselves. This resonated with Tuyuc as she did not receive an education past the sixth grade due to her duties as the eldest daughter. In her adult life, she served as an auxiliary nurse which persuaded her into becoming an activist for Indigenous women. To assist these women, Tuyuc organized and established the CONAVIGUA, making it one of Guatemala's fastest growing activist organization led by women. She served as the general coordinator for CONAVIGUA since its founding in 1988.

Throughout her time in the organization, she represented Indigenous rights for women as well as spoke out against the authorities threats to the Mayan identity. As the founder and general coordinator of CONAVIGUA, Tuyuc was constantly advocating for the rights of Indigenous women and delegating the organizations tasks as it grew not only locally, but nationally as well. Aside from founding one of Guatemala's leading human rights organizations, Tuyuc also held a governmental position. From 1996 to 2000, she was elected and served in Congress. As a political leader as well as a social leader, Tuyuc continued to elevate Indigenous women and Mayan culture. In 2012, she went on to win the Niwano Peace Prize, an acclaimed title that is rewarded to an individual who has embodied and spread peace throughout the world.

== Mission ==
CONAVIGUA's mission has been to support the families and victims of gender and racial oppression in Guatemala, promote equity for women and use active, peaceful resistance. The agency promotes advocacy for justice and provides for immediate needs like nutrition, shelter, and healthcare. The organization also plays a notable role in holding the government to account for figures responsible for militia leaders, corruption, and to enact laws to protect vulnerable populations. Beyond legal advocacy, CONAVIGUA has openly addressed and protested the human rights abuses that occurred during the war, including physical, psychological, sexual, and structural, that plagued Guatemalan society.

In the post-war era, CONAVIGUA exists in seven departments across Guatemala, empowering oppressed groups. The organization has influenced Guatemalan society and contributed significantly to the regional discourse on human rights. Its continued efforts in advocating for meaningful laws, providing essential aid, and promoting peace make CONAVIGUA a notable movement in Latin America's struggle for human rights.

== Hardships ==
As CONAVIGUA evolved and grew as an organization, more people joined in demanding justice for those who "disappeared." They also demanded the eradication of human rights violations of the women in Guatemala. Many of their members began to face threats, torture, and, at times, death for their affiliation. For example María Mejia was shot and killed in 1990 in Parraxtut, El Quiche, by two military commissioners due to her association with CONAVIGUA. Pablo was participating in a peaceful protest regarding forced patrolling when he was shot and killed by civil patrollers in Colotenango, Huehuetenango in 1994.

Searching for the "disappeared" as a member of CONAVIGUA resulted in being noticed by civil patrollers, which was the case with Juana Calachij. Calachij faced attempted kidnapping and was placed on constant surveillance for her exhumation of a mass grave which held the bodies of five deceased, including her husband, in Pacoc, El Quiche. Catarina Terraza Chávez in La Laguna, Nebaj, faced harassment by a supposed military intelligence member in March 1995, and Manuela Tiño experienced death threats from a military commissioner chief and the civil defense patrol chief of San Rafael Chico, Joyabaj. The threats CONAVIGUA members faced not only impacted them but their families as well. Tomás Sug Cañil and Jerónimo Morales Tiriquiz were both active members of CONAVIGUA and because of their association with their organization, they received death threats from the civil patrollers, leading them to uproot their family and flee in 1993.

As those who participated in the organization faced disruption, CONAVIGUA offices were also raided and searched. On July 28, 1991, police and civil patrollers raided CONAVIGUA offices, doubling as quarters and homes for many members. The women in those homes, such as María Morales, were charged with disturbing the peace, and María was warned and instructed to cease her involvement in the organization. Due to the implementation of the Immediate Tranquility for Citizenry national security program, public security officers were given the authority to enter a property without a warrant, which allowed the civil patrollers to enter CONAVIGUA offices with no consequences. Due to this program, those associated with CONAVIGUA lost their privacy and security in their homes and organization offices.

== Outcomes and impacts ==
CONAVIGUA was established in the aftermath of Guatemala's civil war. The organization has had a lasting impact on various fronts, including the way widows and families addressed the challenges of state repression and long standing abuse, its advocacy for widows, social and economic empowerment, memory and truth preservation, and human rights advocacy. The group's advocacy, along with the efforts of other human rights organizations, has contributed to legal actions against individuals responsible for human rights abuses during the civil war. This pursuit of justice has resulted in some cases being brought to trial, bringing accountability a step closer. For instance Maya Achi women filed a court case against six men for raping them in a military base in the early 1980s, and on February 13, 2019, CONAVIGUA coordinator Rosalinda Tuyuc and other group members protested outside Congress against an amnesty bill that would set war criminals, like those six individuals on trial, free.

The organization has worked towards empowering widows by providing support networks and addressing the socio-economic challenges they have faced. This has contributed to breaking the cycle of vulnerability and marginalization. The CONAVIGUA movement has also garnered international attention and support. Through collaboration with global human rights entities, it has drawn attention to Guatemala's post-conflict challenges on the international stage.

== Legacy ==
The CONAVIGUA has set a precedent for indigenous organizations in Guatemala. On a local level CONAVIGUA works with rural indigenous women in Guatemala through developmental projects with the purpose of creating a social consciousness about issues impacting indigenous rights. Another important aspect of the organization's work is the exhumation of mass graves of those lost to armed conflict during the Guatemalan Civil War to provide a proper burial, as well as giving closure to the widows. CONAVIGUA also provides mental health services for widows and women who had suffered sexual violence during the war.

On a national level CONAVIGUA's founder, Rosalina Tuyuc, has been involved in legislative government and the international stage. Tuyuc held office as a congressional deputy in 1995 and, later on in 2004, when she was elected as the national reparations to investigate crimes committed during the civil war. Tuyuc spoke at both the UN Women's general assembly on September 23, 2014 to advocate for the rights of indigenous women and girls, and again in 2020 for the 20th anniversary of the adoption of United Nations Security Council Resolution 1325 on Women, Peace, and Security. CONAVIGUA continues to demand accountability from the Guatemalan government and condemnation for the impunity of the perpetrators of violence against women during the civil war. They also continue to advocate for additional resources in relation to education for children, economic support, and international aid.
