= Josefina García de Noia =

Argentine human rights activist (1921–2015)

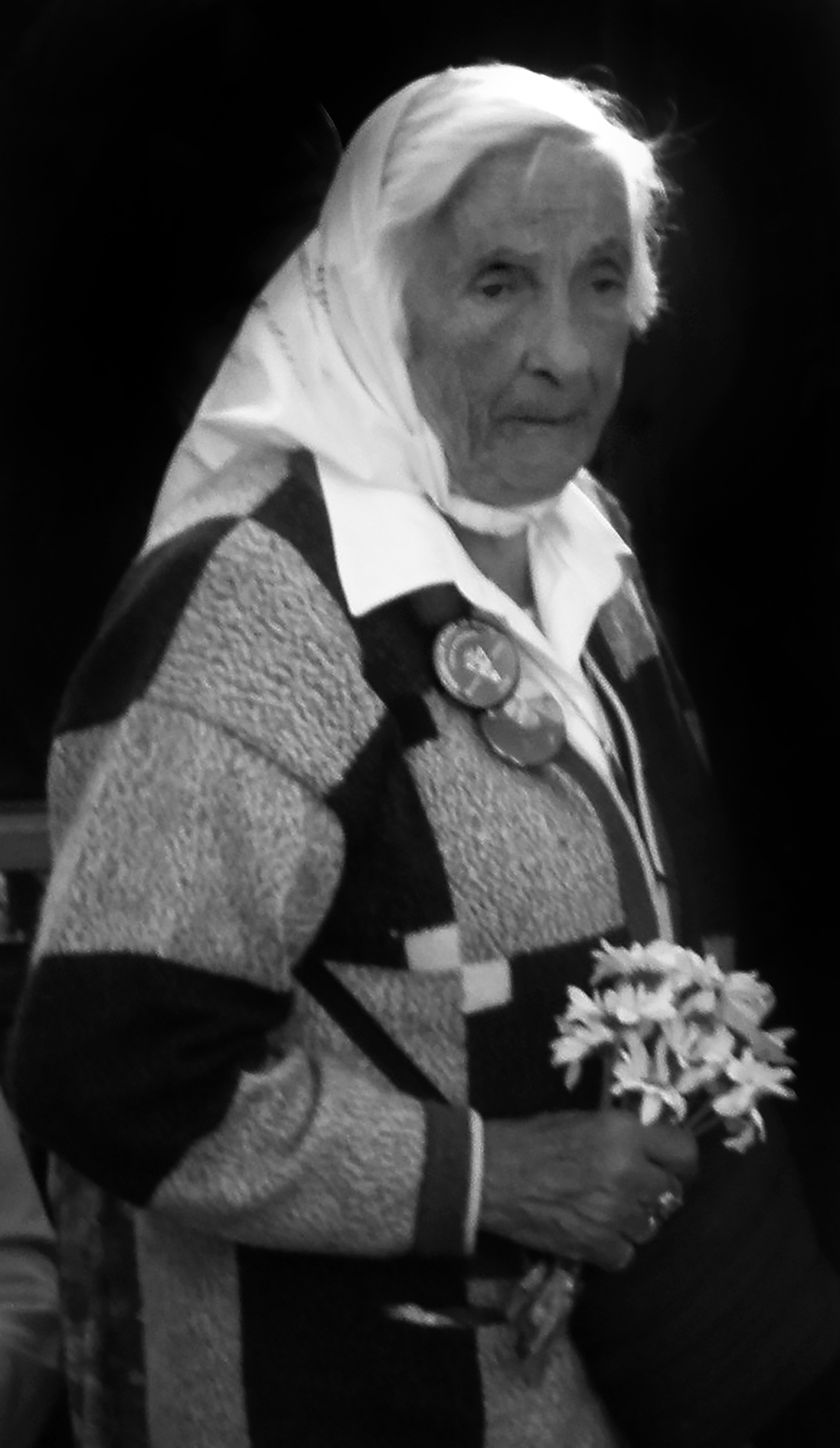
- García de Noia in 2010
- Born: 6 July 1921; Buenos Aires, Argentina
- Died: 31 August 2015 (aged 94); Buenos Aires, Argentina
- Other name: Pepa Noia
- Occupations: Human rights activist; textile worker
- Known for: Founding member of the Mothers of the Plaza de Mayo (Línea Fundadora)
- Spouse: Juan Carlos Noia
- Children: 4
- Awards: Illustrious Citizen of the City of Buenos Aires (2010)

Josefina García de Noia (6 July 1921 – 31 August 2015), commonly known as Pepa Noia, was an Argentine human rights activist and a founding member of the Mothers of the Plaza de Mayo (Madres de Plaza de Mayo), part of the Línea Fundadora (Founding Line). She became a public figure after the forced disappearance of her daughter, María de Lourdes Noia de Mezzadra, during Argentina's last military dictatorship (1976–1983).

== Early life and family ==
García de Noia was born in Buenos Aires. Argentine and Galician press have described her as the daughter of immigrants from Leiro (province of Ourense, Galicia, Spain).

According to the Mothers of the Plaza de Mayo Línea Fundadora, she married Juan Carlos Noia and had four children. Multiple sources describe her work as a textile worker, and note that she lived for many years in Castelar (in Morón Partido).

== Disappearance of her daughter ==
On 13 October 1976, García de Noia's daughter, María de Lourdes Noia de Mezzadra (often cited simply as “Lourdes Noia”), was abducted from her home along with her husband, Enrique Mario Mezzadra. The Biblioteca Nacional Mariano Moreno describes both as having been taken to the ESMA clandestine detention centre; it reports that Enrique Mezzadra was released on 21 October 1976, while María de Lourdes remains disappeared. Press coverage has also reported that the couple's 18-month-old son, Pablo, was left with a neighbour during the abduction.

== Mothers of the Plaza de Mayo ==
After her daughter's disappearance, García de Noia began searching through police stations, ministries, and hospitals, and gradually connected with other women looking for their missing children. She was among the first fourteen women who walked around the Pyramid of May in the Plaza de Mayo on 30 April 1977—an action widely treated as the starting point of the Mothers’ public weekly demonstrations.

For decades, she continued attending the Mothers’ Thursday marches in Plaza de Mayo and was active within the Línea Fundadora grouping.

== Recognition ==
On 5 July 2010, the Buenos Aires City Legislature named García de Noia an Illustrious Citizen of the City of Buenos Aires (Ciudadana Ilustre de la Ciudad de Buenos Aires). The Mothers of the Plaza de Mayo Línea Fundadora also describe her as having been recognised by local institutions in Morón.

== Death ==
García de Noia died on 31 August 2015, aged 94.

== Legacy ==
In 2011, historian Enrique Arrosagaray published a book-length profile of her life and activism, Josefina Pepa de Noia. Una Madre de la primera hora.

== See also ==
- Mothers of the Plaza de Mayo
- Dirty War
- Forced disappearance
- ESMA
- Armed Forces of the Argentine Republic
- Films depicting Latin American military dictatorships
- Héctor Germán Oesterheld, a comic book artist who disappeared during the Dirty War and was presumed dead in 1977
