= Marshall Meyer =

American Conservative rabbi

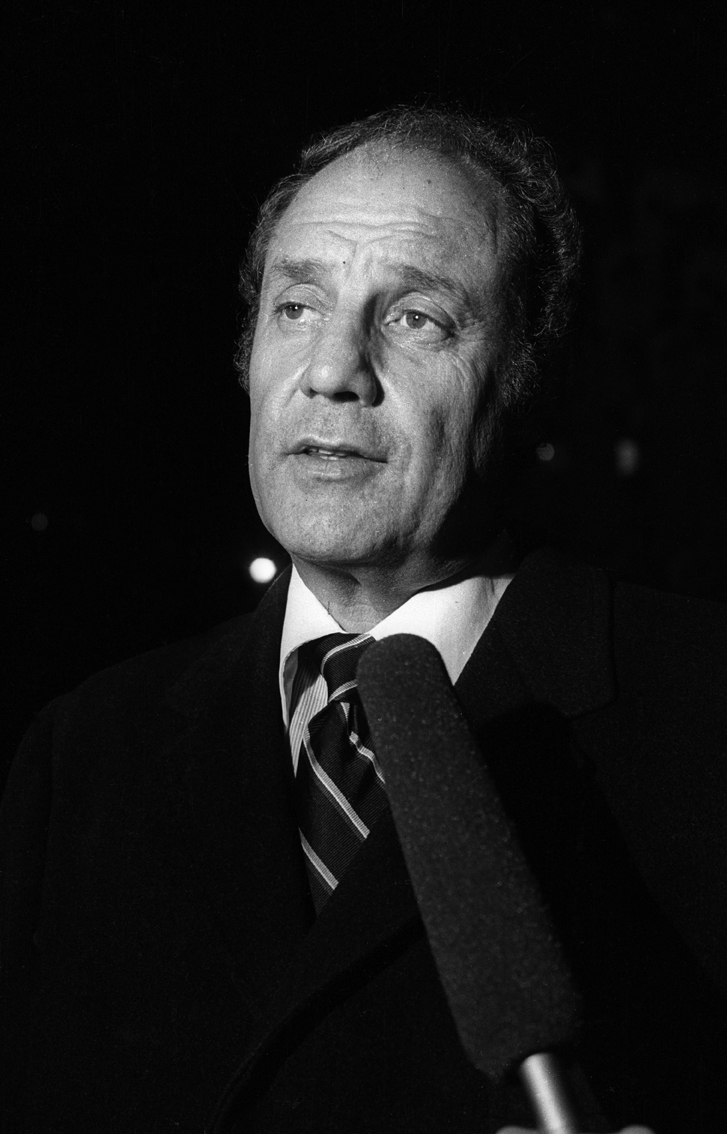
- Born: March 25, 1930; Brooklyn, New York United States
- Died: December 29, 1993 (aged 63); New York City, United States
- Education: Dartmouth College, Jewish Theological Seminary
- Occupation: Rabbi
- Spouse: Naomi Meyer
- Children: Anita, Dodi and Gabriel

Rabbi Marshall T. Meyer (March 25, 1930 – December 29, 1993) was an American Conservative rabbi who became a recognized international human rights activist while living and working in Argentina from 1958 to 1984, during the period of the "Dirty War" in the 1970s. He was elected by president Raúl Alfonsín to be one of the members of the National Commission on the Disappearance of Persons. After the restoration of democracy in 1983, Meyer was awarded the nation's highest honor, the Order of the Liberator General San Martín, by the new president.

In Argentina Meyer also led the congregation Comunidad Bet El and founded Seminario Rabínico Latinoamericano, a Conservative Jewish rabbinical school in Buenos Aires that has trained generations of Spanish-speaking rabbis.

Rabbi Meyer returned to the United States in 1984 and that year became rabbi of Congregation Bnai Jeshurun in New York City. He was called to revive the congregation of the oldest Ashkenazi synagogue in the city.

He was one of those honored by president Cristina Fernández de Kirchner to those who fought for the restoration of democracy in Argentina.

== Early life and education ==
Marshall Theodore Meyer was born in Brooklyn New York in a Jewish family and raised in Norwich, Connecticut. He attended Dartmouth College, graduating in 1952. After meeting Rabbi Abraham Joshua Heschel, he enrolled in the Jewish Theological Seminary. Heschel became his mentor and spiritual guide, whose influence and example profoundly affected Meyer's career as a religious leader. After receiving ordination in 1958, Meyer was called as a rabbi to the Congregación Israelita de la República Argentina (Templo Libertad), where he worked for two years. He then left and started the Comunidad Bet El in Buenos Aires, Argentina.

== Career in Argentina ==
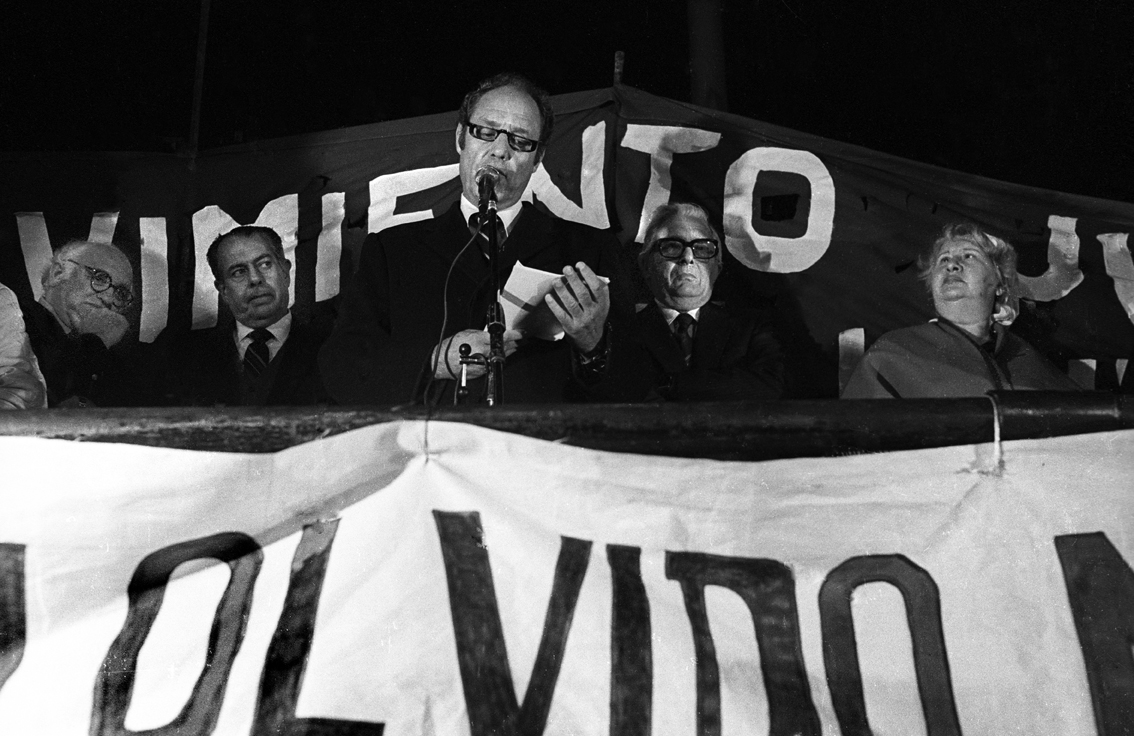
Meyer speaking at an event convened by the Movimiento Judío por los Derechos Humanos

Rabbi Marshall T. Meyer used his energy and charisma to contribute to the Argentine Jewish community. He founded the Seminario Rabínico Latinoamericano, a rabbinical school in Buenos Aires that soon became the center of Conservative Judaism in Latin America. In it were ordained dozens of Spanish-speaking rabbis who served communities in Argentina, Latin America, and the rest of the world.

Rabbi Meyer led Comunidad Bet El, a congregation that became a model of many other Conservative synagogues, both in Argentina and Latin America. The congregation established its own day-school.

During the years of the military regime of 1976–1983, Rabbi Meyer became a strong critic of the military government and its violations of human rights. He worked to save the lives of hundreds of people who were being persecuted by the regime. He visited political prisoners in jails. He worked with the Israeli government to free the renowned journalist, Jacobo Timerman, who had been persecuted, imprisoned and subjected to extended house arrest. Timerman dedicated his memoir of that time, Prisoner Without A Name, Cell Without A Number (1981), to the rabbi. Timerman wrote that Meyer had "brought solace to Jewish, Christian and atheist prisoners". Meyer additionally founded the Movimiento Judío por los Derechos Humanos, an organization that played a key role in the fight for human rights in Argentina.

In 1983, when democracy was restored in Argentina, the newly elected president, Raúl Alfonsín, recognized the work of Rabbi Meyer by awarding him the highest Argentine decoration, Order of the Liberator General San Martín. Rabbi Meyer returned the United States in 1984.

In 2019, the City of Buenos Aires honored Meyer for his work visiting prisoners during the military regime by placing a graffiti wall in his memory, in the capital's main square.

== Later period ==
After a short stay at the University of Judaism (now the American Jewish University) in Los Angeles, in 1984 Rabbi Meyer accepted the position of rabbi at Congregation Bnai Jeshurun in New York City. It is the oldest Ashkenazic synagogue in the city, and he had the mission of reviving the congregation.

Between 1984 and 1993, B'nai Jeshurun became a thriving liberal community that attracted thousands of Jewish people. The challenging theology espoused by Rabbi Meyer, the spiritually uplifting religious services, an agenda that emphasized social action as a central part of the synagogue's principles, ecumenical work with Christian and Muslim clergy, and a leading role in the peace movement in regard to the Arab–Israeli conflict, led to the rapid growth of the congregation. It became a model for many other synagogues in the United States.

== Personal life ==
Meyer married Naomi Meyer, and they had three children: Anita, Dodi and Gabriel.

He died of cancer in 1993 and was buried in the cemetery of the synagogue of his home town in Norwich, Connecticut.
