= Rosalina Tuyuc =

Guatemalan human rights activist

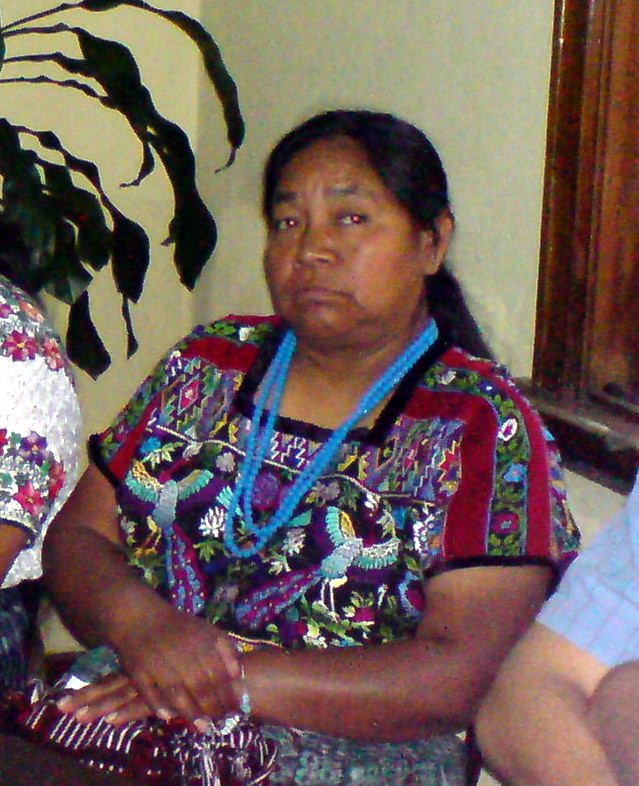
Rosalina Tuyuc in 2007

Rosalina Tuyuc Velásquez (born San Juan Comalapa, department of Chimaltenango, 1956) is a Guatemalan human rights activist. She was elected as a Congressional deputy in 1995, elected from the national list of the New Guatemala Democratic Front, and served as Vice President of Congress during that period. Tuyuc is Kaqchikel Maya.

== Biography ==
In June 1982, the Guatemalan Army kidnapped and murdered her father, Francisco Tuyuc. Three years later, on 24 May 1985, her husband suffered the same fate. In 1988, she founded the National Association of Guatemalan Widows (CONAVIGUA), which has become a leading Guatemalan human rights organization.

In 1994, Tuyuc was decorated by the French Ordre national de la Légion d'honneur for her humanitarian activities. On 6 July 2004 President Óscar Berger appointed her to chair the National Reparations Commission (Comisión Nacional de Resarcimiento). In 2011, she publicly criticized the Commission for its failure to adequately address the damage caused by the war.

She was elected as a member of Congress for National List for Democratic Front New Guatemala party in 1995 general election. She took office on 14 January 1996, along with Aura Marina Otzoy and Manuela Alvarado became one of the first Maya women to win a seat.

The Niwano Peace Foundation of Japan awarded their 2012 Niwano Peace Prize to Tuyuc "in recognition of her extraordinary and dogged work for peace as a courageous human rights activist and leader."

== See also ==
- Guatemalan Civil War
