= Hebe de Bonafini =

Argentine activist (1928–2022)

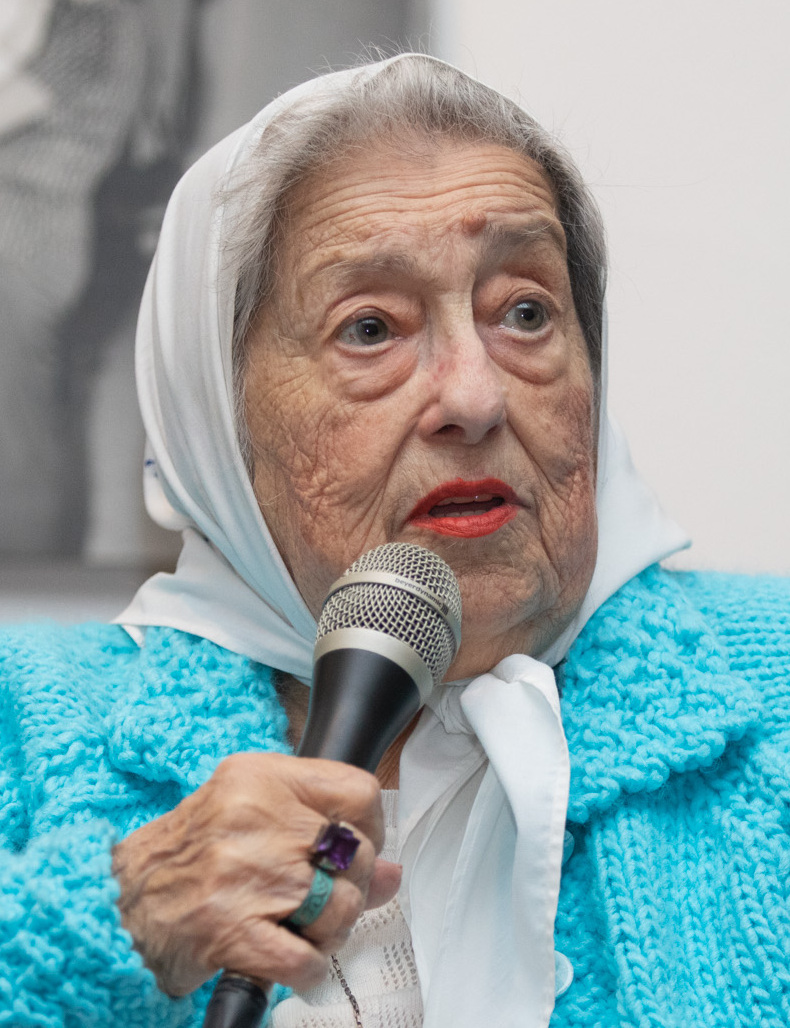
- Bonafini in October 2022
- Born: Hebe María Pastor; 4 December 1928; Ensenada, Buenos Aires Province, Argentina
- Died: 20 November 2022 (aged 93); La Plata, Buenos Aires Province, Argentina
- Title: President of the Mothers of the Plaza de Mayo
- Term: 1979–2022
- Spouse: Humberto Alfredo Bonafini (m. 1942; died 1982)
- Children: 3

Hebe María Pastor de Bonafini (4 December 1928 – 20 November 2022) was an Argentine activist who was one of the founders of the Association of the Mothers of the Plaza de Mayo, an organization of Argentine mothers whose children disappeared during the National Reorganization Process military dictatorship.

== Career ==
=== Mothers of the Plaza de Mayo (1979–1986) ===
As president of the Mothers of the Plaza de Mayo Association beginning in 1979, Bonafini spoke out in defense of human rights, both in Argentina and abroad, gaining international recognition; she received the UNESCO Prize for Peace Education in 1999. Adopting the rallying cry of Aparición con vida (Make them appear alive) in 1980, Bonafini demanded an immediate accounting of all of the forced disappearances, including her sons, who were members of the marxist guerrilla group called Montoneros, which along with the other communist organization, Ejército Revolucionario del Pueblo, were responsible of more than 10.000 terrorist attacks that left more than 1.000 people dead. Amid a gradual loosening of restrictions, she organized a March of Resistance along the Avenida de Mayo on 10 December 1982. This event marked the first time the group marched outside the namesake Plaza de Mayo, and the first time it was joined by large crowds of sympathizers.

Following the return to civilian rule in 1983, divisions began to develop in the organization relating to President Raúl Alfonsín's overly cautious progress in prosecuting the perpetrators of the Dirty War. Alfonsín established the 1985 Trial of the Juntas; but the decision to limit the proceedings to nine leading military junta members, as well as the acquittals handed to five of these, further antagonized Bonafini, who believed the president would forego further prosecutions for political considerations. The Mothers Association split in 1986, establishing two groups of around 2,000 members each: Bonafini's Mothers of the Plaza de Mayo Association, and the Mothers of the Plaza de Mayo—Founding Line. Bonafini was generally identified with the more radical faction, choosing to justify the methods undertaken by guerrillas during the dictatorship.

=== Post-military dictatorship ===
In the wake of the 11 September 2001 attacks, Bonafini generated international controversy when she defended the actions of the terrorist airline hijackers, saying, "I felt that there were many people in that moment who were happy and felt that the blood of so many in that moment were avenged ... because the NATO bombings, the blockades and the millions of children who die of hunger in this world, that was due to this power that those men attacked, with their own bodies. And everyone knew it." Bonafini stood behind her support to organizations accused of terrorism such as FARC. Walter Wendelin, leader of the etarran Askapena organization, was invited as guest teacher in the University of Mothers of Plaza de Mayo.

Journalist Horacio Verbitsky criticized her support of the terrorist attacks, and Bonafini replied, "Verbitsky is a servant of the United States. He receives wages from the Ford Foundation and, besides being Jewish, he is completely Americophile." She was accused of antisemitism, but denied it by saying that she merely intended to describe Verbitsky as an American agent. Verbitsky requested the tapes of the interview to the magazine that published them, and confirmed that Bonafini indeed said what the magazine had reported she said. She generated more controversy in 2005 by stating that, as Pope John Paul II "committed many sins, he [would] go to hell." She added that she "didn't say more than what the Roman Catholic Church taught me."

The relationship of the Néstor and Cristina Fernández de Kirchner administrations with Bonafini was very close. President Néstor Kirchner received Bonafini at the Casa Rosada within days of his 25 May 2003, inauguration, and regularly consulted her during his tenure.

Bonafini announced in January 2006 that her organization would discontinue its annual March of Resistance out of recognition of President Néstor Kirchner's success in having the Full Stop Law and Law of Due Obedience (two Alfonsín-era measures which had effectively ended most Dirty War prosecutions) declared unconstitutional. The Association of the Mothers of the Plaza de Mayo, led by Bonafini, benefited from increased government funding during the Kirchner administrations, and extended its influence through a newspaper (La Voz de las Madres), a radio station, and a university (People's University of the Mothers of Plaza de Mayo).

The association also manages a federally funded housing program, Sueños Compartidos ("Shared Dreams"), which by 2008 oversaw construction of over 2,600 housing units earmarked for slum residents. Sueños Compartidos had completed 5,600 housing units and numerous other facilities in six provinces and the City of Buenos Aires by 2011. Its growing budgets, which totaled around US$300 million allocated between 2008 and 2011 (of which $190 million had been spent), came under scrutiny and generated nationwide controversy when a suspected case of embezzlement by the chief financial officer of Sueños Compartidos, Sergio Schoklender, and his brother Pablo (the firm's attorney) arose. The Schoklender brothers, who were convicted in 1981 of the murder of their parents and spent fifteen years in prison, had gained Bonafini's confidence and managed the project's finances with little oversight from either the Mothers of Plaza de Mayo or the program's licensor, the Secretary of Public Works. Their friendship ended in June 2011, however, after Bonafini became aware of irregularities in their handling of the group's finances. Following an investigation ordered by Federal Judge Norberto Mario Oyarbide, the Secretary of Public Works canceled the Sueños Compartidos contract in August and transferred the outstanding projects to the Undersecretary of Housing and Urban Development.

Bonafini expressed support for figures such as Che Guevara, Fidel Castro, Augusto Sandino, Yasser Arafat, Hugo Chávez, Evo Morales, and the mothers of ETA prisoners. She declared herself against social democracy, capitalism, neo-liberalism, globalization, and the International Monetary Fund. She also attacked Bolivian protesters for occupying Plaza de Mayo, calling them "shitty"; and suggested seizing the Supreme Court by force for the delays of the application of the Audiovisual Media Law.

== Personal life ==
Pastor was born in Ensenada on 4 December 1928. She died in La Plata on 20 November 2022 at age 93.

== Awards ==
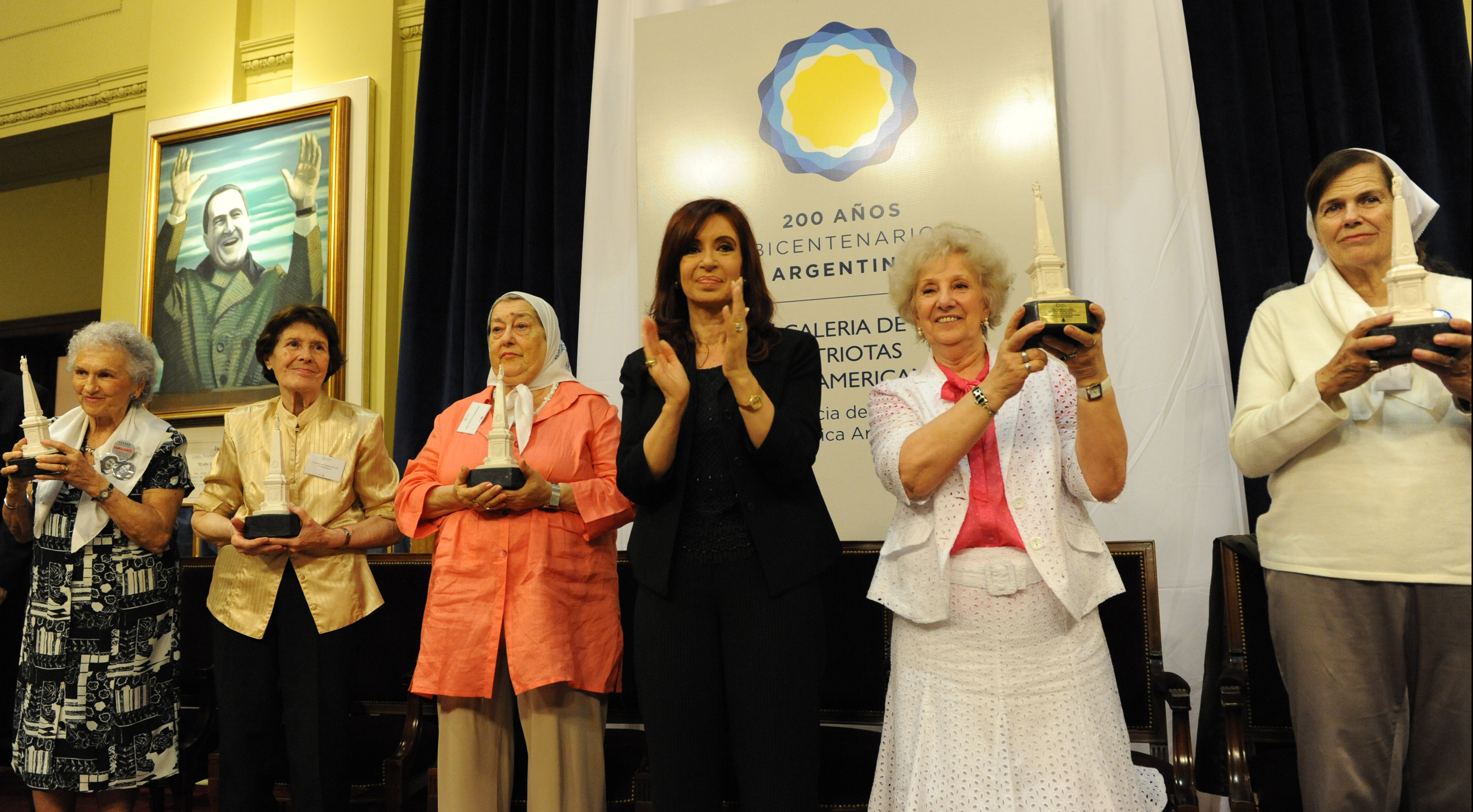
Hebe de Bonafini (third from left) and other laureates of the May Revolution Human Rights Extraordinary Prize, with President Cristina Fernández de Kirchner (in black)

- Honorary degree of University of California (1996), University of Bologna (2007) and Experimental National University of the Yaracuy (2010)
- Honorary Medal of 70 Anniversary of the University Reform, 1988, National University of Córdoba
- National Order of Merit of Ecuador (2006)
- Appreciation Liberarte/2006, Liberarte Foundation
- Prize Don Hilario Cuadros and title Social and Cultural Ambassador of the Youth, Youth Direction of Province of Mendoza, 2008
- Special Prize of Veintitrés, 2009
- Bicentennial of the May Revolution Human Rights Extraordinary Prize, 2010, Argentine Republic
- Rodolfo Walsh Prize of Communication and Human Rights, National University of La Plata, 2011
- Honor Prize of Radio Nacional, 2013
- Grifo d'Argento, highest prize of Genoa, 2013
