= Comunidad Bet El =

Jewish congregation in Buenos Aires

Congregation Bet El
- Spanish: Comunidad Bet El

Religion
- Affiliation: Conservative Judaism
- Ecclesiastical or organizational status: Synagogue
- Status: Active

Location
- Location: Buenos Aires
- Country: Argentina

Architecture
- Type: Synagogue architecture
- Founder: Rabbi Marshall Meyer
- Established: 1962 (as a congregation)
- Groundbreaking: 1972
- Completed: 1973

Website
- betel.org.ar

The Comunidad Bet El is a Conservative Jewish congregation and synagogue, located in Buenos Aires, Argentina.

== History ==
The congregation was founded in 1962 as a result of tensions within the Israelite Argentine Congregation caused by the arrival of rabbi Marshall Meyer. Meyer instituted changes to ritual practices that were broadly popular with youth but not with more conservative members of the congregation. Meyer was the founding rabbi of Bet El; having previously resigned as rabbi of the Congregación Israelita de la República Argentina, he was convinced to take the post by a group that also left that congregation to found a new one.

The Seminario Rabinico Latinoamericano, which was also founded in 1962, was built near Bet El. Many youth studied at the Seminario after their b'nai mitzvah. Bet El and the Seminario were involved in the Instituto de Diálogo Interreligioso along with Protestant and Catholic groups.

In 1972, Comunidad Bet El had a 600-family membership and broke ground for the construction of a new synagogue and school complex. In June 1973, it opened its new sanctuary, dedicating it to Abraham Joshua Heschel. In 1974, it opened the first Jewish day school in South America and ran a Camp Ramah summer camp program.

== See also ==
- History of the Jews in Argentina
- List of synagogues in Argentina
