= Schoklender case =

Parricide in Buenos Aires, Argentina

The Schoklender case was a parricide that occurred at dawn on May 30, 1981, when Sergio Schoklender and Pablo Schoklender murdered their parents in their apartment in Belgrano in Buenos Aires.

== Background ==
The newly graduated industrial engineer Mauricio Schoklender and Cristina Romano Silva met on January 11, 1955 in a downtown café. He belonged to a middle-class Jewish family while she was Catholic, which did not please the boy's mother. Despite this animosity, they married that year on July 7 and immediately moved to the city of Tandil in southern Buenos Aires province, where Mauricio had found a job in the Tandil Metallurgical Company SA.

Their three children were born in this city: Sergio, Pablo and Ana Valeria Schoklender. The couple lived humbly at first, but gradually became successful. Cristina organized literary meetings in their home. When the crime came to light, some neighbors recalled that the Schoklender house was dirty and messy, and that Cristina drank excessively and used to leave her children home alone. By 1968, Mauricio started working at Pittsburgh & Cardiff Coal Co. SA, so the family moved to Buenos Aires to the fourth floor of the building located in Tres de Febrero 1480, in Belgrano, which subsequently hosted the drama.

== Crime ==
On the night of May 29, 1981, 20-year-old Pablo returned to the apartment and heard that his parents had returned. He hid in the closet of his brother's bedroom. At approximately 3 am on Saturday 30th, Pablo woke his brother and they went to the living room. When his mother got up and walked towards them, Pablo smashed her head with a 30 centimetres (12 in) long and 3 centimetres (1.2 in) wide steel bar, used for weight lifting. The first blow struck the right side of her head, causing her to fall on her face. Sergio hit her twice in the back of the neck. He used a blue shirt to strangle her. Pablo wrapped her in a blanket and put a plastic bag on her head. They used rags to clean the blood on the parquet floor.

Over the next two hours the brothers deliberated what to do with their father and decided to kill him. They went to his room where he was sleeping. With multiple heavy blows they destroyed almost all the bones of his skull. Sergio passed the rope around their father's neck to make a tourniquet with the bar. They wrapped him in a bottom sheet and put a plastic bag on his head.

== See also ==
- Schoklender scandal
