= Manuela Alvarado =

Guatemalan politician

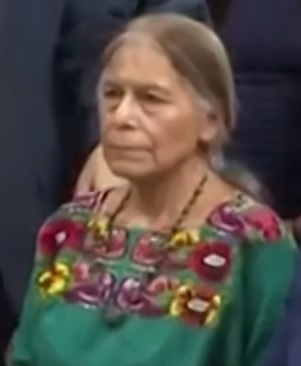

Member of Central American Parliament for Guatemala
- Incumbent
- Assumed office 14 January 2024

Member of the Congress of Guatemala
- In office 14 January 1996 – 14 January 2000
- Constituency: Quetzaltenango

Personal details
- Born: Cantel, Quetzaltenango
- Party: Roots
- Other political affiliations: Semilla; Democratic Front New Guatemala

Manuela Alvarado López is a Guatemalan indigenous activist and politician. A founding member of Semilla party, she is member of the Central American Parliament for Guatemala since 2024, having been elected in 2023 general election.

== Biography ==
Alvarado is a Kʼicheʼ Mayan, she worked as a nurse and primary school teacher in her native Cantel, Quetzaltenango. Subsequently, Alvarado was a community leader. She was elected as the representative of Mayan women in the National Council for Peace Agreements.

She was elected as a member of Congress for Quetzaltenango Department for Democratic Front New Guatemala party in 1995 general election. She took office on 14 January 1996 and became one of the first Mayan women to win a seat.

As a member of Congress, she chaired the Legislative Women's Commission in 1997. During her term, a first bill was presented to criminalize sexual harassment and discrimination. After, she served on the Legislative Finance Commission. She did not run for re-election and left Congress in 2000.

Alvarado returned to politics as founder of Semilla party. She occupied second place on the party list for the Central American Parliament in 2023 general election and was elected.
