= Gregory Shvedov =

Russian activist (born 1976)

Grigory Sergeyevich Shvedov (Григорий Сергеевич Шведов, born 14 October 1976) is a Russian human rights activist and journalist, known for his efforts in promoting human rights in Russia, most notably in the Caucasus region. He is currently the editor-in-chief of the Caucasian Knot (Кавказский узел), an online news medium established to provide unbiased information regarding political oppression, human rights violations, and the ongoing violent conflict throughout the region. In 2012, he received the Geuzenpenning for his efforts.

== Career ==
=== Memorial International ===
Initially, before the creation of the Caucasian Knot, Shvedov worked with the international society Memorial, a group that focuses on researching and educating people on past political oppression, the consequences, and how it relates to their world today. The group initially started in 1989 in Moscow by initiating protests against human rights violations. Ten years later Shvedov began his work with Memorial. From 2001-2004 he conducted regional and inter-regional projects that focused on educating and informing the people on regional issues. From 2002-2006 he was a supervisor of 70 regional branches across Russia and other FSU countries. He still serves as a board member, and is the Director of the MEMO.RU Information Agency.

=== Caucasian Knot ===
Currently Shvedov is the Editor-in-Chief of the Caucasian Knot, an independent online news and information medium that was initially under the auspices of Memorial International. The site was initially founded in 2001 by Memorial, the English version became operational in August 2003, and in 2007 it became an independent site. Initially, Memorial founded the site as an information resource dedicated to the Caucasus states, since then they have transformed themselves into a professional news source. Shvedov has a simple goal for the site:

"offering independent information is our goal. We do not have other "missions" or "agendas". We are an independent news source publishing hard news, features, analyses, reference data and blogs on the 19 regions that we cover, including the unrecognised territories in the Southern Caucasus and all Russian regions close to the Caucasus range."

Caucasian Knot is more than a news broadcasting company. In Russia and the surrounding regions, reporting on crime and corruption can be dangerous to those involved. However, through the use of free Google applications that allow the 50 or so journalists to stay connected and report remotely from anywhere, the government cannot come knocking on the door, "We don't have a door, he explained. We don't have a newsroom at all."

This freedom not only allows the site to illuminate issues that officials may wish to keep in the dark, it also serves as a platform for discussion to those on the ground level, readers are encouraged to share and report on events going on in their location as well as interact with others on the site. Shvedov states that:

"User-generated content can be more powerful than traditional coverage in spreading awareness of an issue... A reader who knows nothing about conflict in the Caucasus may watch a one-minute video and post a comment. That builds dialogue and more dialogue increases the chance of mainstream media coverage.
