= Mothers of Plaza de Mayo =

Argentine human rights group for "disappeared" children

- Madres de Plaza de Mayo
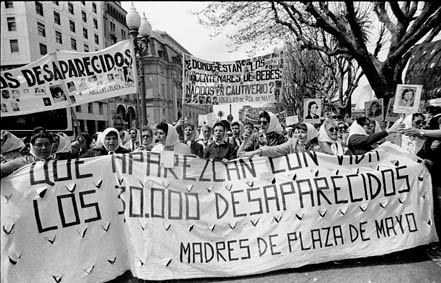
- Second "March of Resistance" held on 9 and 10 December 1982. The flag reads "Let the 30,000 who disappeared show up alive" (desaparecidos in Spanish)
- Formation: 1977
- Founders: Azucena Villaflor, Esther Ballestrino, María Ponce de Bianco, Josefina García de Noia, Hebe de Bonafini, Mirta Acuña de Baravalle, and others
- Founded at: Buenos Aires, Argentina
- Methods: Nonviolent resistance
- Key people: Alice Domon, Léonie Duquet, Haydeé Gastelú, María Adela Gard de Antokoletz, Mirta Acuña de Baravalle, Berta Braverman
- Website: madres.org

The Mothers of Plaza de Mayo (Spanish: Madres de Plaza de Mayo) is an Argentine human rights association formed in response to abuses by the National Reorganization Process, the military dictatorship by Jorge Rafael Videla. Initially the association worked to find the desaparecidos, people who had disappeared without arrests, trials or judicial process; most were believed dead. Their mothers and supporters investigated to determine the culprits of what were considered crimes against humanity in order to bring them to trial and sentencing.

The Mothers began demonstrating in the Plaza de Mayo, the public square located in front of the Casa Rosada presidential palace, in the city of Buenos Aires, on 30 April 1977. They petitioned to have their disappeared children, mostly young adults, returned alive. The women demonstrated in the square on a daily basis and held signs with their pleas, followed by carrying photos of their missing children, and wearing white scarves with their names. By declaring a state of emergency, police expelled them from the public square.

In September 1977, in order to make a larger opportunity to share their stories with other Argentinians, the mothers decided to join the annual pilgrimage to Our Lady of Luján, located 30 miles (48 km) outside Buenos Aires. To stand out among the crowds, the mothers wore children's nappies (diapers) as headscarves. Following the pilgrimage, the mothers decided to continue wearing these headscarves during their meetings and weekly demonstrations at the Plaza. On them, they embroidered the names of their children and wrote their main demand: "Aparición con Vida" (Proof of life).

During the years of the Dirty War (the name used by the military junta in Argentina from 1976 to 1983 as a part of Operation Condor), military and security forces suppressed known and suspected political dissidents. They cast a new against anyone suspected to be associated with socialism, left-wing Peronism, or the Montoneros guerrillero movement.

As the Mothers publicized the disappearances of thousands of victims, they opposed the de facto government and suffered persecution, including kidnappings and forced disappearances of their own members. Most notably founders Azucena Villaflor, Esther Ballestrino, and María Ponce de Bianco, and French nun supporters Alice Domon and Léonie Duquet, disappeared. They were later found to have been murdered, perpetrated by a group led by Alfredo Astiz, a former commander, intelligence officer, and naval commando who served in the Argentine Navy during the military dictatorship.

The Argentine Forensic Anthropology Team, known for having found and identified the remains of Che Guevara, later found the bodies of these women and determined that they had been killed via death flights, when they were thrown out of planes to die in the sea.

On the first days of December 1980, the first "March of Resistance" was held, consisting of mostly women marching around the public square for 24 hours.

Despite democracy being re-established in the 1983 general election, the Mothers movement continued to hold marches and demonstrations, demanding trials and sentences for the military personnel who had participated in the government that overthrew Isabel Perón in the 1976 coup d'état. This would eventually culminate in the Trial of the Juntas of 1985.

The Mothers of Plaza de Mayo have received widespread support and recognition from many international organizations. They were the first association to receive the Sakharov Prize for Freedom of Thought. They also helped other human rights groups throughout their history. The 1980 Nobel Peace Prize recipient Adolfo Pérez Esquivel was an active supporter of the association, for which he was harassed by the dictatorship.

Since 1986 the Mothers of Plaza de Mayo have been divided into two factions, the majority group "Mothers of Plaza de Mayo Association" (presided by Hebe de Bonafini) and "Mothers of the Plaza de Mayo-Founding Line". Ceremonially, every Thursday at 3:30 p.m, the Mothers of Plaza de Mayo march around the May Pyramid at the central hub of Plaza de Mayo. At 4:00 p.m they give speeches from the Equestrian monument to General Manuel Belgrano, where they opine over the current national and global situation.

== Purpose ==
Women had organized to gather, holding a vigil, while also trying to learn what had happened to their adult children during the 1970s and 1980s. They began to gather for this in 1977 every Thursday at Plaza de Mayo in Buenos Aires, in front of the Casa Rosada presidential palace, in public defiance of the government's law against mass assemblies. Wearing white headscarves to symbolize the diapers (nappies) of their lost children, now young adults. These were embroidered with the children's names and dates of birth. For months the government had refused to answer questions about the missing people; the mothers marched in twos in solidarity to protest the denials of their children's existence or their mistreatment by the military regime. Despite personal risks, they wanted to hold the government accountable for its murders and other abuses committed in the Dirty War.

== Activism and reaction ==
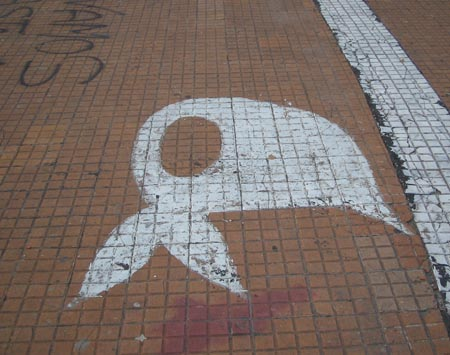
The white shawl of the Mothers of Plaza de Mayo, painted on the floor in Buenos Aires, Argentina

The Mothers of Plaza de Mayo were the first major group to organize against the Argentina regime's human rights violations. Together, the women created a dynamic and unexpected force, which overturned traditional constraints on women in Latin America. These mothers came together to push for information on their children. Their actions highlighted the human rights violations and the scale of the protest drew press attention, raising awareness on a local and global scale. Their persistence to publicly remember and try to find their children, the sustained group organisation, the use of symbols and slogans, and the silent weekly protests attracted reactive measures from those in power.

The military government considered these women to be politically subversive. After the founder, Azucena Villaflor De Vincenti, listed names of 'the missing' in a newspaper in December 1977 (on International Human Rights Day), she was kidnapped, tortured and murdered. (She was later found to have been killed on a 'death flight', when she was thrown into the sea to die.) French nuns Alice Domon and Léonie Duquet, who also supported the movement, were also killed in this manner. Their deaths were ordered by Alfredo Astiz and Jorge Rafael Videla (who was a senior commander in the Argentine Army and dictator of Argentina from 1976 to 1981), both of whom were later convicted and sentenced to life in prison for their roles in the repression of dissidents during the Dirty War.

Esther Ballestrino and María Ponce de Bianco, two other founders of the Mothers of Plaza de Mayo, also were "disappeared".

In 1983, former military officers began to reveal information about some of the regime's human rights violations. Eventually, the military has admitted that more than 9,000 of those abducted are still unaccounted for. The Mothers of Plaza de Mayo say that the number of missing is closer to 30,000. Most are presumed dead. Many of these prisoners were high school students, and young adult professionals and union workers who were suspected of having opposed the government. Those 'taken' were generally below the age of 35, as were the members of the regime who tortured and murdered them.

Jewish activists comprised a disproportionate number of the "disappeared" as the military was anti-Semitic. This was documented in the article Prisoner Without a Name, Cell Without a Number, which provided testimony of Jacobo Timerman and his experience of torture and abuse during this time.

It was not until 2005 and the advanced use of DNA analysis that many human remains could be identified after mass graves were found and excavated. Families chose whether to have the remains cremated or buried; Azucena's ashes were interred in the Plaza de Mayo.

Today, the Mothers are engaged in the struggle for human, political, and civil rights in Latin America and elsewhere.

== Origins of the movement ==
On 30 April 1977, Azucena Villaflor de De Vincenti and a dozen other mothers walked to the Plaza de Mayo in Argentina's capital city.

The original founders of the group were Azucena Villaflor de De Vincenti, Berta Braverman, Haydée García Buelas; María Adela Gard de Antokoletz, Julia, María Mercedes and Cándida Gard (four sisters); Delicia González, Pepa Noia, Mirta Acuña de Baravalle, Kety Neuhaus, Raquel Arcushin, and Senora De Caimi.

When the disappearances began, each mother thought that their child's disappearance was a single unique case. Initially, the lack of media coverage of the disappearances led the mothers to believe that they were alone in their plight. As each mother visited prisons, hospitals, and police stations searching for their missing children, they began to notice other mothers who were also searching for their children. The women began to realize that these disappearances were systematic, organized, and planned.

While many of their adult children had become educated and politically active, most of the mothers came from traditional working-class backgrounds and had limited knowledge of political processes. But they banded together to confront the regime as a unified front of mothers seeking answers about their missing children.

Each of the women had at least one child who had 'disappeared', sometimes known to have been arrested or detained, 'taken' the military government. The mothers declared that between 1970 and 1980, more than 8,500 individuals became "Desaparecidos" or "the disappeared". These people were erased from public records; no level of government had notes of arrests or evidence of charges against them.

The women decided to risk a public protest, although gatherings of more than three people had been banned. They linked arms and walked in pairs, as if on a stroll just across the street from the presidential office building, the Casa Rosada (the Pink House). The mothers chose this site for its high visibility. They hoped to gain information on their children's whereabouts to recover them from prison or to properly bury them if their deaths were acknowledged.

The "disappeared" were believed to have been abducted by agents of the Argentine government during the years known as the Dirty War (1976–1983). Those who were found had often been disposed in rural areas or unmarked graves; their remains showed evidence of torture and executions.

== Becoming a movement ==
As growing numbers joined weekly marches on Thursdays, the day the first few met, the Mothers also began an international campaign to defy the propaganda put out by the military regime. This publicity campaign brought the attention of the world to Argentina.

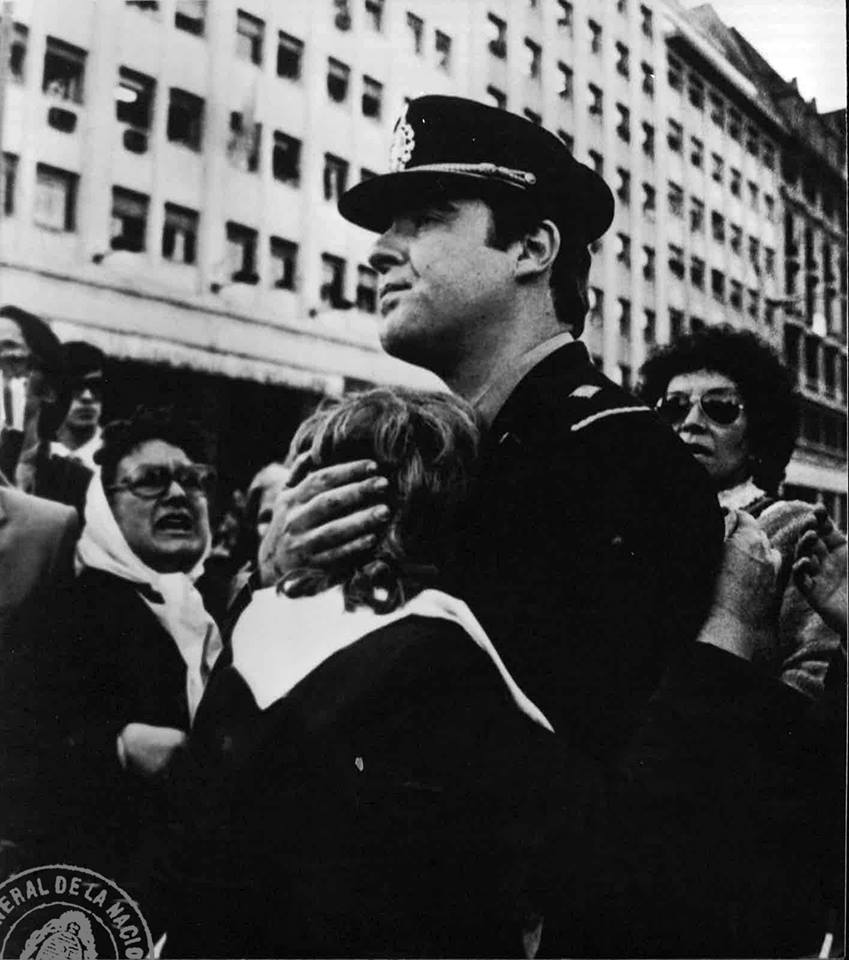
A policeman (Carlos Gallone) and a Mother during an act of protest at Plaza de Mayo, October 1982

One year after the Mothers of Plaza de Mayo was founded, hundreds of women were participating, gathering in Plaza for weekly demonstrations. They found strength with each other by marching in public, and attracting some press. They made signs with photos of their children and publicized their children's names. They wore white headscarves embroidered with the names and dates of births of their lost children.

The government tried to trivialize their action calling them "las locas" (the madwomen).

As the number of disappeared grew, the movement grew, and the Mothers were getting international attention. They began to try to build pressure from outside governments against the Argentine dictatorship, by sharing the many stories of the "disappeared".

On 10 December 1977, International Human Rights Day, the Mothers published a newspaper advertisement with the names of their missing children. That same night, Azucena Villaflor (one of the original founders) was kidnapped from her home in Avellaneda by a group of armed men. She is reported to have been taken to the infamous ESMA torture centre, and from there on a "death flight" over the ocean. In-flight, the abducted were drugged, stripped, and flung into the sea to die, or killed and thrown overboard.

An estimated 500 of the missing are the children who were born to pregnant 'disappeared' women being held in concentration camps or prisons. Many of these babies were given in illegal adoptions to military families and others associated with the regime. Their birth mothers are generally believed to have been killed. The numbers of such children are hard to determine due to the secrecy surrounding the abductions.

== Global impact ==
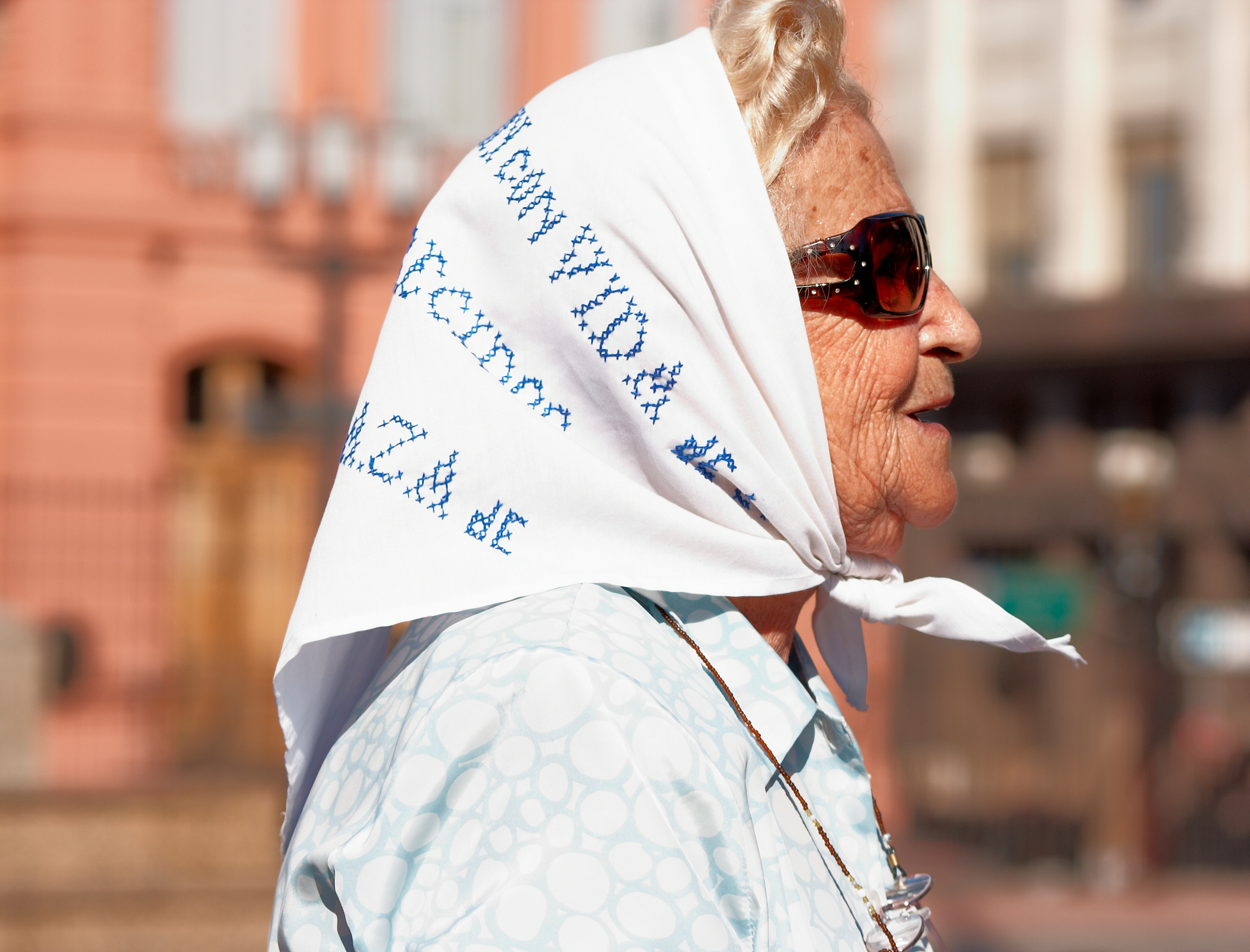
Mercedes Colás de Meroño

Individual members worked to bring visibility to their cause in addition their movement inspired other movements this section inspired both.

In 1978, when Argentina hosted the World Cup, the Mothers' demonstrations at the Plaza were covered by the international press in town for the sporting event.

Later when Adolfo Scilingo spoke at the National Commission on Disappeared People, he described how many prisoners were drugged and thrown out of planes to their deaths in the Atlantic Ocean. From early 1978 onwards, residents who lived along the Río de la Plata have found human remains of those abducted, murdered and dumped at sea. Bodies continued to wash up in the years after the fall of the regime.

Some of the movement's most prominent supporters' bodies were never found, such as that of French national Alice Domon. Domon and Léonie Duquet, both French nuns, were taken during the Dirty War. Their disappearance attracted international attention and outrage, with demands for a United Nations investigation of human rights abuses in the country. France demanded information on the women, but the Argentine government denied all responsibility for them.

In 2005, forensic anthropologists dug up some remains of bodies that had been buried in an unmarked grave after washing ashore (in late December 1977) near the beach resort of Santa Teresita, south of Buenos Aires. DNA testing identified among them Azucena Villaflor, Esther Careaga and María Eugenia Bianco, three pioneer Mothers of Plaza who had been "disappeared", as well as Léonie Duquet. In December 2005, Azucena Villaflor's ashes were buried in the Plaza de Mayo.

The Mothers of the Plaza de Mayo inspired similar movements across Central America. Their activism which emerged in response to the disappearance of young women during military dictatorship extended far beyond Argentina. Their weekly marches and even symbolic wardrobes, inspired other women-led movements in countries such as El Salvador, Guatemala, and Honduras as they used their personal grief and persistent non-violent presence to confront state violence, and impunity.

In El Salvador the Mothers of the Disappeared (CoMadres) was formed in the 1980s during the Salvadorian civil war. They drew direct inspiration from the Mothers of the Plaza de Mayo. Similar to their movement the CoMadres used their grief over the disappearance of their children to form a powerful political movement using motherhood to unite. The unison between motherhood and activism created a form of resistance that is both unique and inspirational which is what allowed Salvadoran women to confront the state’s violence and the exclusion of women in political life.

In Guatemala the CONAVIGUA also known as the National Coordination of Widows of Guatemala, formed during the Guatemalan civil war. The organization was made up of majority widows whose husbands were killed or missing. These women also used their grief and personal experiences and turned it into a demand for justice. They focused on the state's violence which was the true issue while also focusing on human rights. Similar to the Argentine mothers, the widows of CONAVIGUA used their identities of women who were grieving while trying to survive and thrive to challenge the state's impunity and demand accountability during the civil war.

Public marches, symbolic clothing, and protests all led by grieving women demanding justice for those disappeared and or murdered. The Mothers of the Plaza de Mayo served as a reference point which shaped Women's resistance and demand for truth outside actress Central America.

Outside the Americas, The Mothers of the Plaza de Mayo also inspired similar movement in Indonesia, Aksi Kamisan (Thursday Action).

== Divisions and radicalization ==
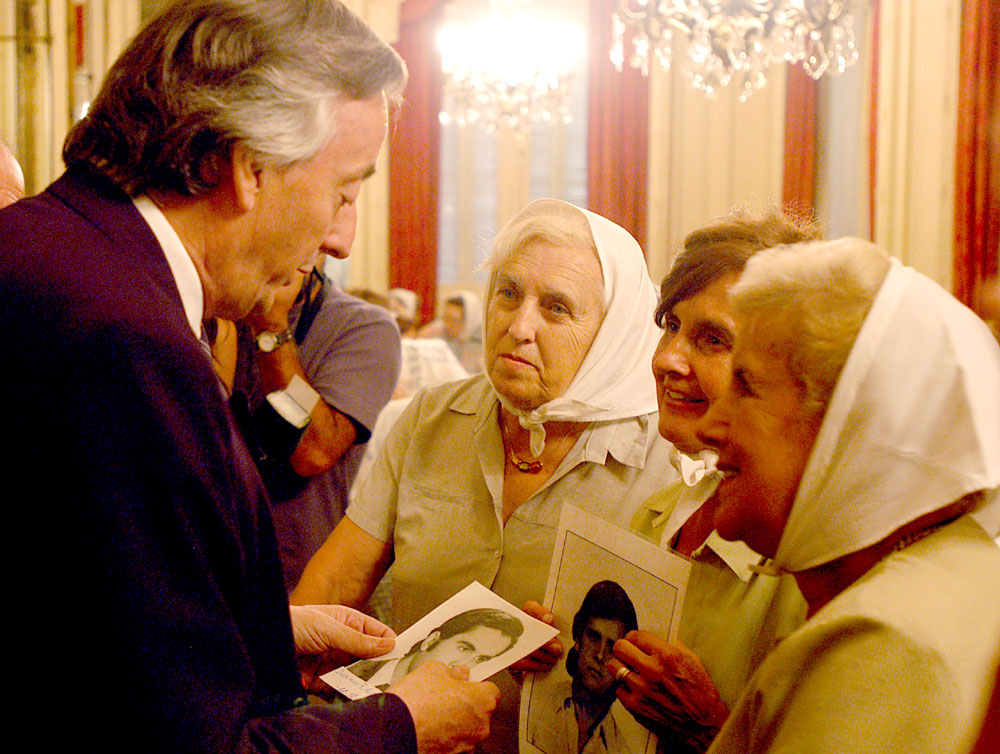
The mothers with President Néstor Kirchner

Never giving up their pressure on the regime, after the military gave up its authority to a civilian government in 1983, the Mothers of Plaza de Mayo rekindled hopes that they might learn the fates of their children, and pushed again for the information.

Beginning in 1984, teams assisted by the American geneticist Mary-Claire King began to use DNA testing to identify remains, when bodies of the "disappeared" were found.

The government conducted a national commission to collect testimony about the "disappeared", during which they heard from hundreds of witnesses. In 1985, it began the prosecution of men indicted for crimes, beginning with the Trial of the Juntas. Several high-ranking military officers were convicted and sentenced as a result.

The military threatened a coup to prevent a widening of prosecutions. In 1986, Congress passed Ley de Punto Final, which stopped the prosecutions for some years.

But in 2003, Congress repealed the Pardon Laws, and in 2005 the Argentine Supreme Court ruled them unconstitutional. During the Kirchner administration, the prosecution of war crimes was re-opened. Former high-ranking military and security officers have been convicted and sentenced in new cases. Among the charges is the stealing of babies of the disappeared. The first major figure, Miguel Etchecolatz, was convicted and sentenced in 2006. Most of the members of the Junta were imprisoned for crimes against humanity.

With the Grandmothers of Plaza de Mayo, a group set up in 1977, the Mothers have identified 256 missing children who were adopted soon after being born to mothers in prison or camps who later "disappeared". Seven of the identified children have died. At the beginning of 2018, 137 of those children, now grown adults, were found and were offered the chance to meet their biological families.

Some Mothers and Grandmothers suffered disappointments when the grandchildren, now adults, did not want to know their hidden history, or refused to have their DNA tested. Parents who were judged in court to be guilty of adopting – or "appropriating" – the children of the disappeared, while knowing the truth about their origins, were susceptible to imprisonment.

In 1986, the Mothers split into two factions. One group, called the "Mothers of the Plaza de Mayo-Founding Line", focused on legislation, the recovery of the remains of their children, and bringing ex-officials to justice.

Hebe de Bonafini continued to lead a more radical faction under the name Mothers of Plaza de Mayo Association. These mothers felt responsible for carrying on their children's political work and assumed the agenda that originally led to the disappearance of the dissidents. Unlike the Founding Line, the association refused government help or compensation. They pledged not to recognize the deaths of their children until the government would admit its fault.

A scholar of the movement, Marguerite Guzman Bouvard, wrote that the association faction wanted "a complete transformation of Argentine political culture" and "envisions a socialist system free of the domination of special interests". The Mothers Association is now backed by younger militants who support socialism.

In the wake of the attacks on United States on 11 September 2001, Bonafini said "I was happy when I first heard the news, that for once they were the ones attacked, I'm not going to lie." She said that "the U.S.A [was] the most terrorist of all countries, throwing bombs everywhere around the world" but "felt bad for the innocent workers dead (because of the terrorist attack)." Her remarks were criticised in mainstream media.

Speaking for the Mothers, Bonafini rejected the government's investigations of alleged Iranian involvement in the 1994 AMIA Bombing (the terrorist attack on the AMIA Jewish community center), saying the CIA and Mossad were misleading the investigation. She said that they repudiate "the tragic attack, but respect for the victims and their families requires to investigate and do justice," without being "politically manipulated in the service of US interests."

== 'Final' March of Resistance ==
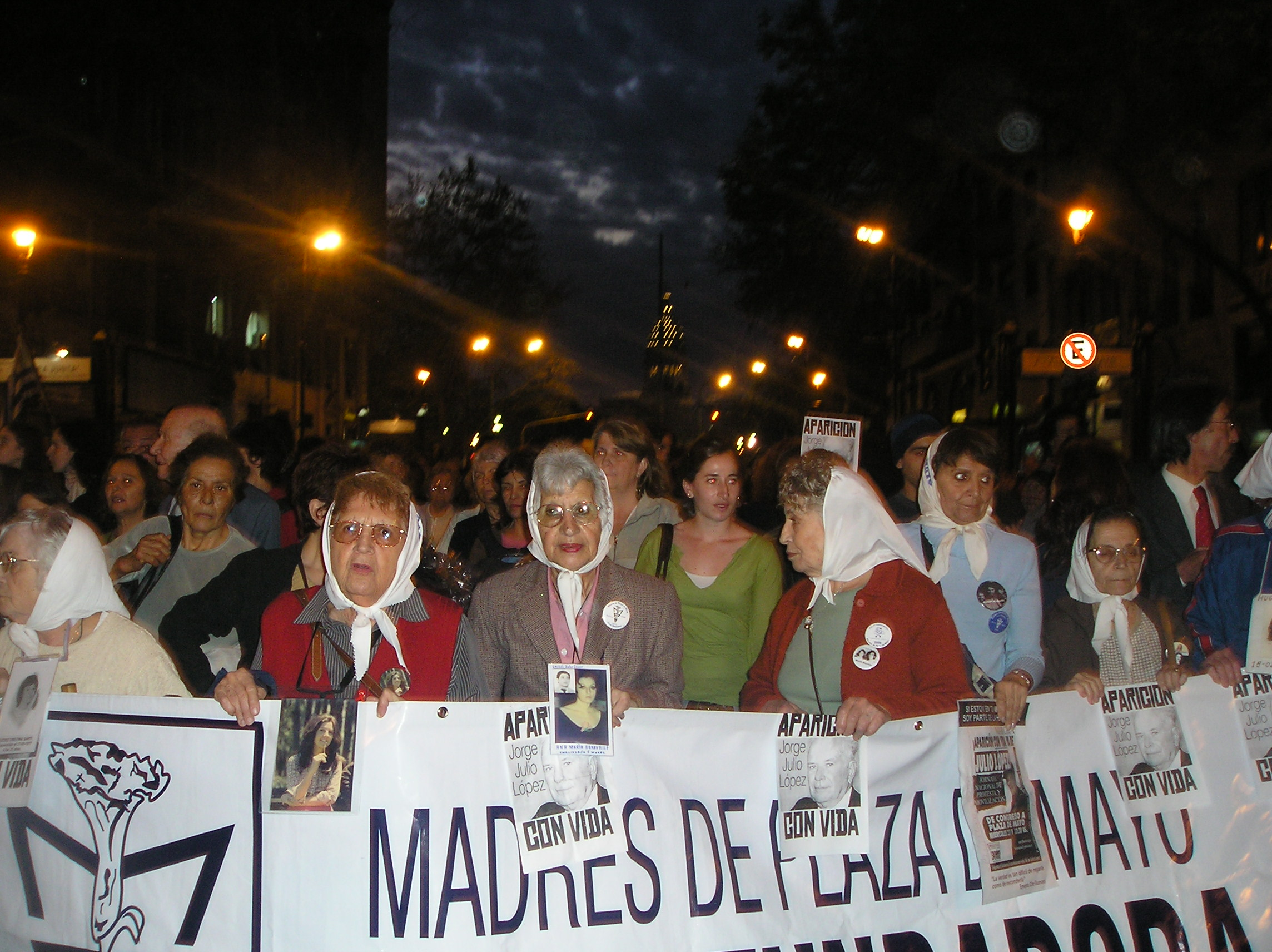
The Madres de la Plaza de Mayo march in October 2006

On 26 January 2006, members of the Madres de la Plaza de Mayo Association faction announced what they said was their final annual March of Resistance at Plaza de Mayo, saying "the enemy isn't in the Government House anymore." They acknowledged the significance of President Néstor Kirchner's success in having the Full Stop Law (Ley de Punto Final) and the Law of Due Obedience repealed and declared unconstitutional. They said they would continue weekly Thursday marches in pursuit of action on other social causes.

The Founding Line faction announced that it would continue both the Thursday marches and the annual marches to commemorate the long struggle of resistance to the dictatorship.

In 2003 there were changes to the law that had ended prosecutions of persons for actions during the Dirty War. In 2006, following new trials, suspects were convicted and sentenced. Investigations and prosecutions have continued into the 2020s.

== Social involvement and political controversies ==
The association faction remained close to Kirchnerism. They established a newspaper (La Voz de las Madres), a radio station, and a university (Popular University of the Mothers of Plaza de Mayo).

The association at one time managed a federally funded housing program, Sueños Compartidos ("Shared Dreams"), which it founded in 2008. By 2011, Sueños Compartidos had completed 5,600 housing units earmarked for slum residents, and numerous other facilities in six provinces and the city of Buenos Aires.

Its growing budgets, which totaled around US$300 million allocated between 2008 and 2011 (of which $190 million had been spent), came under scrutiny. There was controversy when the chief financial officer of Sueños Compartidos, Sergio Schoklender, and his brother Pablo (the firm's attorney) were alleged to have embezzled funds.

(The Schoklender brothers had been convicted in 1981 for the murder of their parents and served 15 years in prison.) After gaining Bonafini's confidence, they were managing the project's finances with little oversight from the Mothers of Plaza de Mayo or the program's licensor, the Secretary of Public Works. Their friendship with the association ended in June 2011 after Bonafini learned of irregularities in their handling of the group's finances. Following an investigation ordered by Federal Judge Norberto Oyarbide, the Secretary of Public Works canceled the Sueños Compartidos contract in August 2011. The outstanding projects were transferred to the Undersecretary of Housing and Urban Development.

== Gender and motherhood ==
Issues of gender and motherhood were embedded in this movement. From its inception, the Mothers has been a strictly women-only organization, as the mothers of the disappeared were asserting their existence in the embroidered scarves, posters and demands for restoration of their children. In the later political movement, the women felt it had to continue as women-only partly to ensure their voices and actions would not be lost in a male-dominated movement, and partly out of a belief that men would insist on a lengthy bureaucratic process rather than immediate action. They also believed that women were more tireless and had more emotional strength than men.

Gender separatism reaffirmed that the status of the two Mothers groups as a women's movement. Some scholars questioned whether the movement truly challenged the notion of female passivity, and whether the message would have been more powerful if male family members had also been involved.

The Mothers movement raised questions of women in political space and the boundaries surrounding that space. The socially constructed gender roles prevalent in Argentine society restricted the arena of politics, political mobilisation, and confrontation to men. When the Mothers entered Plaza de Mayo, a public space with historical significance, they politicised their role as mothers in society and redefined the values associated with both politics and motherhood itself. Although they did not challenge the patriarchal structure of Argentine society, by crossing boundaries into the masculinised political sphere, they expanded spaces of representation for Argentine women and opened the way for new forms of civic participation.

The Mothers were committed to child-centred politics, symbolised by the white scarves they wore on their heads. The scarves were originally nappies, or were meant to represent diapers; they were embroidered with the names of their disappeared children or relatives. These headscarves identified the Mothers and symbolised children, and thus life, as well as hope and maternal care. The colour white also symbolised the women's refusal to wear a black mantilla and go into mourning until they knew the fate of their children. The disappeared children were at the heart of the movement, as the Mothers fought for a system that would respect human life and honour its preservation.

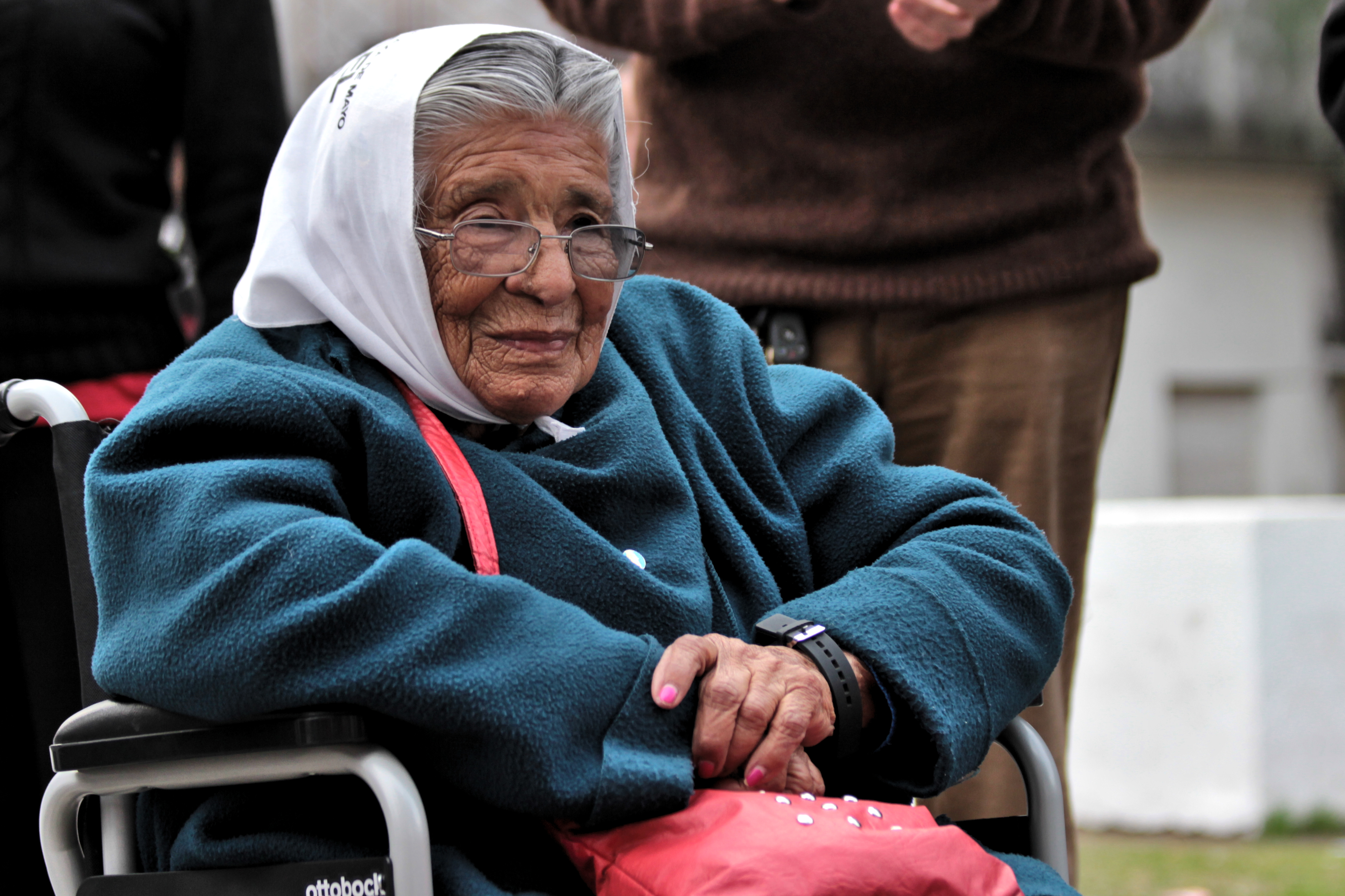
Santa Fe commemoration of 2000 rounds of the Madres de Plaza de Mayo, 2016

The Mothers of Plaza de Mayo politicised and gave new value to the traditional role of mothers. They used motherhood to frame their protest, demanding the rights inherent to their role: to conserve life. They protested not only what had been done to their children, but also to themselves as mothers by taking them away. The heart of the movement was always "women's feelings, mother's feelings", according to Hebe de Bonafini. She further stated that "it was the strength of women, of mothers, that kept us going." The women's identity as mothers did not restrict them from participating or making an impact in a masculinised political space.

Their public protests contradicted the traditional, "private" domain of motherhood. By mobilising, they politicised their consciousness as women. They performed a conservative representation of motherhood, which avoided some controversy and helped attract the support of international media. They refuted the concept that to be taken seriously or to be successful, a movement either has to be gender-neutral, or masculine: femininity and motherhood was integral to the Mothers' protest.

Mothers of Plaza de Mayo actively transformed traditional ideas of motherhood and gender into political identity and strategy, rather than acting solely on their shared experiences as grieving parents. The mothers converted their overlooked personal pain due to the disappearance of their children into a collective political claim about truth justice, and the public expression of this grief gave their protests strong moral authority in Argentine society. Their shared emotional bonds and their symbolic use if the public sphere played a significant role in their protests. The repeated marches in the Plaza de Mayo formed socially charged public spaces where memory, grief, and resistance were shared collectively, directly confronting state violence. Throughout the Neoliberal era, Madres prolonged the use of memory, public rituals and maternal symbolism to spread awareness and connect past state violence with the ongoing struggles that were faced for social justice in Argentina. Subsequently, expanding their activism beyond the dictatorship. Interviews were documented in the 1985 film, further illustrating how their public advocacy and collective awareness reshaped the understanding of maternal activism during the oppression.

== Grandmothers ==
The Grandmothers of Plaza de Mayo (Spanish: Asociación Civil Abuelas de Plaza de Mayo) is an organization which has the aim of finding the "stolen" babies, whose mothers were killed during the Junta's dictatorship in 1977. Its president is Estela Barnes de Carlotto. As of June 2019, their efforts have resulted in finding 130 grandchildren most now young adults.

== Awards and prizes ==
- In 1992, all members of the Mothers' association were awarded the Sakharov Prize for Freedom of Thought.
- In 1997, María Adela Gard de Antokoletz was awarded the Gleitsman International Activist Award by the Gleitsman Foundation.
- In 1997, the organization was awarded the Geuzenpenning in Vlaardingen, Netherlands
- In 1999, the organization was awarded the United Nations Prize for Peace Education.
- On 10 December 2003, the Grandmothers' president, Estela Barnes de Carlotto, was awarded the United Nations Prize in the Field of Human Rights.

== Representation in other media ==
- Argentina, 1985 (2022), an Argentine drama film about the first trial of members of the military junta for crimes against humanity.
- The Official Story (1985) is a film related to the "stolen babies" cases.
- Cautiva is another film related to the "stolen babies" cases.
- An opera entitled Las Madres de la Plaza (2008) premiered in Leffler Chapel at Elizabethtown College in Pennsylvania. It was written in a collaboration of students, staff, and faculty of the school, headed by James Haines and John Rohrkemper.
- In an episode of Destinos set in Argentina, protagonist Raquel is told about the Mothers of the Plaza and sees a portion of a march.
- On "Little Steven" Van Zandt's 1984 release, Voice of America, he pays tribute to Las Madres de Plaza de Mayo with his song, "Los Desaparecidos".
- Rock band U2 wrote a song, "Mothers of the Disappeared", inspired by, and in tribute to, their cause. The song appeared on their 1987 album The Joshua Tree.
- The Mothers of Plaza de Mayo (Spanish: Las Madres de la Plaza de Mayo, 1985) is an Argentine documentary film directed by Susana Blaustein Muñoz and Lourdes Portillo about the Mothers of Plaza de Mayo. It was nominated for an Academy Award for Best Documentary Feature.
- The documentary Los Desaparecidos (The Disappeared, 2008) follows the horrors of Argentina's Dirty War. The film follows a child of the disappeared and his involvement in Los Madres is touched on throughout the documentary.

== See also ==
- Black Sash
- Films depicting Latin American military dictatorships
- Ladies in White
- Mourning Mothers
- Saturday Mothers
- Tiananmen Mothers
- Women in Black
- Madres buscadoras
- Alfredo Astiz
- Laura Carlotto
- Estela de Carlotto
- Alice Domon
- Léonie Duquet
- Maria Eugenia Sampallo
- Jorge Rafael Videla
