= Presidency of Néstor Kirchner =

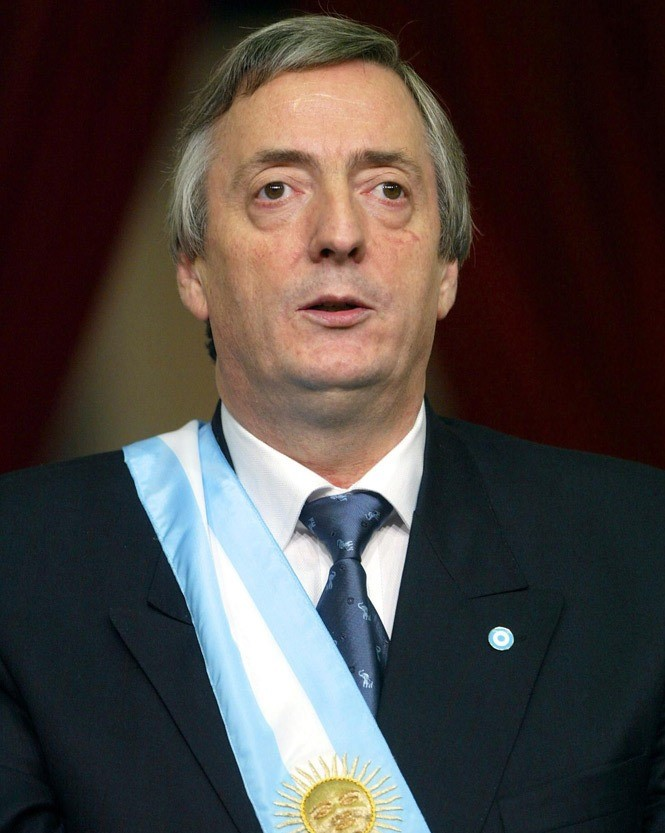
- Presidency of Néstor Kirchner; 25 May 2003 – 10 December 2007
- President: Néstor Kirchner
- Party: Justicialist Party (PJ), Front for Victory (FPV)
- Seat: Casa Rosada, Olivos, Greater Buenos Aires
- Standard of the President

Néstor Kirchner became President of Argentina on 25 May 2003. He was the governor of Santa Cruz Province during the 2003 general election, he was elected second to Carlos Menem but became president when Menem refused to go for a required runoff election. It was a government characterized as centre-left. He declined for a second term and was later succeeded by his wife, Cristina Fernández de Kirchner as president, on 10 December 2007.

== 2003 presidential election ==
Even though Kirchner ran for presidency with the support of Eduardo Duhalde, he was not the initial candidate chosen by the president. Trying to prevent a third term of Carlos Menem, he sought to promote a candidate that may defeat him, but Carlos Reutemann (governor of Santa Fe) did not accept and José Manuel de la Sota (governor of Córdoba) did not grow in the polls. He also tried with Mauricio Macri, Adolfo Rodríguez Saá, Felipe Solá and Roberto Lavagna, to no avail. He initially resisted helping Kirchner, fearing that he may ignore Duhalde once in the presidency.

After the first round of the election, Kirchner visited the president of Brazil, Luiz Inácio Lula da Silva, who received him enthusiastically. He also declared he was proud of his radical left-wing political past.

Although Menem, who was president from 1989 to 1999, won the first round of the election on April 27, 2003, he only got 24% of the valid votes — just 2% ahead of Kirchner. This was an empty victory, as Menem was viewed very negatively by much of the Argentine population and had virtually no chance of winning the runoff election. After days of speculation, during which polls forecast a massive victory for Kirchner with about a 30%–40% difference, Menem finally decided to stand down. This automatically made Kirchner president of Argentina, despite having secured only 22% of the votes in the election, the lowest percentage gained by the eventual winner of an Argentine presidential election. He was sworn in on 25 May 2003 to a four-year term of office.

Amid an intensification of social and political protest following the resignation of Fernando de la Rúa and the Avellaneda massacre of 26 June 2002, in which Maximiliano Kosteki and Darío Santillán were killed, president Eduardo Duhalde brought forward the elections to March and April 2003 and later issued Decree 1399/2002, resigning early and irrevocably from the presidency effective 25 May 2003.

To resolve the institutional gap, the Congress approved a modification to the Presidential Succession Law (Ley de Acefalía), establishing that "if a President and Vice President of the Nation have been elected, they shall assume the vacant offices", without that time being considered part of their constitutional mandate.

== Policies ==
=== Economy ===
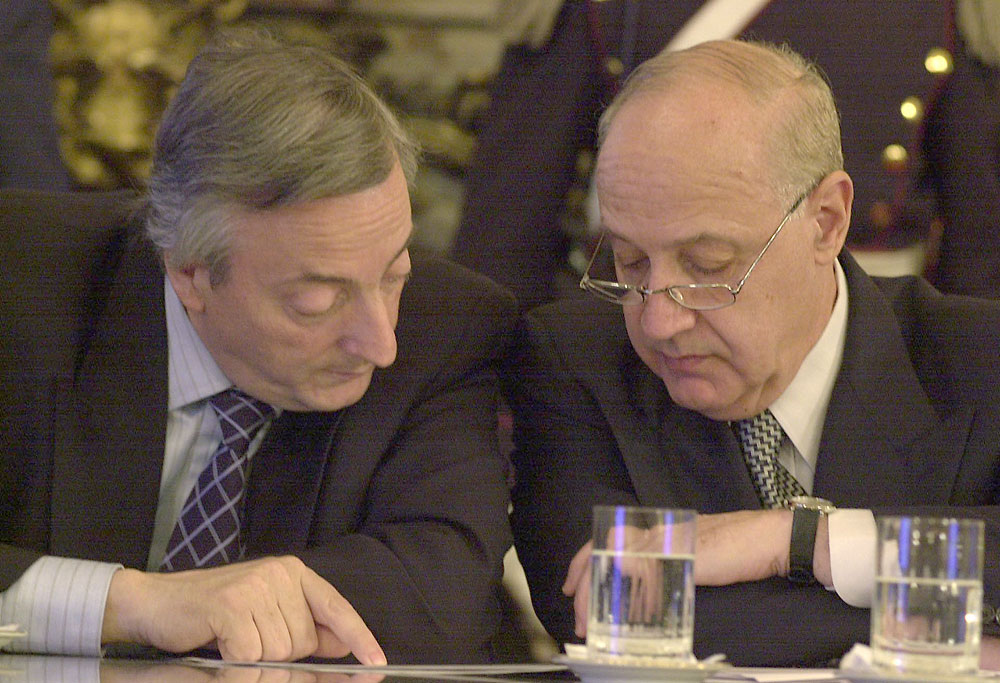
Néstor Kirchner and the Minister of Economy during most of his term, Roberto Lavagna.

The economic policy of the Kirchner government continued the guidelines established by Lavagna under the presidency of Duhalde, maintaining the devaluation of the currency through strong participation by the Central Bank in purchasing foreign currency and promoting economic growth through exports with GDP rates close to 10%. In 2004, only a couple of months after Néstor Kirchner took office, the Central Bank decided to incorporate about 55 tonnes of gold into the nearly nonexistent official reserves, in what was the largest addition of bullion since 1960. After the exit from the 2001 crisis, which marked the end of the regime of Fernando de la Rúa, with a deep recession and historic peaks of poverty and unemployment, an important economic and social recovery was achieved. During the government of Kirchner (2003–2007), poverty fell from 62% to 35%; unemployment from 19.7% to 8.5%; and the Gross Domestic Product (GDP) grew at rates between 8% and 9% per year. Public debt during the administration of Néstor Kirchner had reached its peak between the end of 2001 and the beginning of 2002, with a debt-to-GDP ratio of 166%, but it declined sharply to less than 40 percent.

Year	GDP growth
2003	▲8.8%
2004	▲9.0%
2005	▲9.2%
2006	▲8.4%
2007	▲8.0%

From the beginning of the government of Néstor Kirchner, the role of the state in the economy expanded compared with its role during the government of Carlos Menem. This was reflected in the nationalization of Aerolíneas Argentinas, Correo Argentino, Río Santiago Shipyard and the creation of ENARSA and Agua y Saneamientos Argentinos.

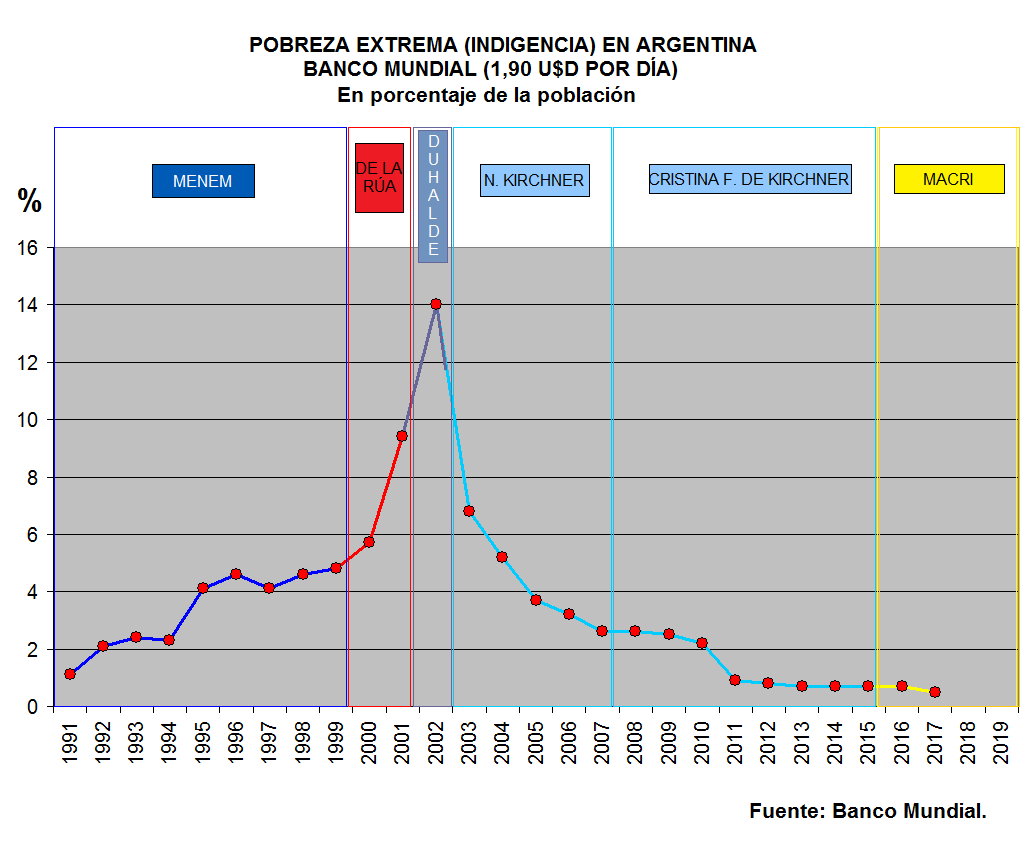
Evolution of poverty (US$1.90 per day) between 1991 and 2017. Source: World Bank.

From 2003 to 2007 the country recorded a phase of economic growth with rates around 9% (8.8% in 2003, 9% in 2004, 9.2% in 2005, 8.5% in 2006, 8.7% in 2007, 6.8% in 2008).

Argentina had faced a serious economic crisis in previous years, which led to the 2001 riots and the fall of Fernando de la Rúa. Eduardo Duhalde was appointed president, and with his minister Roberto Lavagna he improved national economy. Although Duhalde had to resign as well, for political reasons, and the economic improvement was not enough to turn him into a popular candidate, by the time he handed government to Kirchner the most critical periods were already endured and the economy was already in a growing tendency. The growth of Argentina during 2003, an effect of the economic recovery, was the highest in all Latin America.

Kirchner kept the Duhalde administration's Minister of the Economy, Roberto Lavagna. Lavagna also declared that his first priority now was social problems. Argentina's default was the largest in financial history, and it gave Kirchner and Lavagna significant bargaining power with the IMF, which loathes having bad debts on its books. During his first year of office, Kirchner achieved a difficult agreement to reschedule $84 billion in debts with international organizations, for three years.

In the period 2003–2007, Argentine industry grew at an average annual rate of 10.3% in terms of the Physical Volume Index (IVF). Banks once again gained deposits: these increased from 114,462 million dollars in December 2004 to 169,729 million in December 2006, implying growth of more than 48%.

In 2004 the national tourism promotion project was approved, a regulation through which the Executive Branch sought to generate a general framework for the development and promotion of activities in the sector, creating incentives and attractions for visitors and residents. Inbound tourism represented 1.6% of GDP in 2004 (exceeding 1.4% in 2002 and the 1% average of the previous decade). In 2004, 3.4 million tourists entered Argentina. By 2006 a total of 4.1 million international tourists had arrived, of whom 60% came from neighboring countries. By 2007 more than 5.3 million tourists had arrived, setting a historical record for international arrivals.

As of 2004, the initial indulgence ended, and the economic recovery induced the foreign powers to request a normalization in debt payment. Although the IMF was highly unpopular in Argentina, Kirchner's good image (nearing 71% by that point) did not lower more than three or five points; with the exception of the far-left, most of the society was concerned with the possible consequences of a complete default.

At the same time a 75% reduction of the debt was proposed, which implied a decrease of 61.35 billion dollars of the principal, reducing it to 20.45 billion dollars. In June 2004 an agreement was reached with international organizations and the governments of bondholders abroad and overdue interest was recognized. On 3 January 2006 Argentina fully paid its debt to the International Monetary Fund (IMF), making an early payment of 9.53 billion dollars, a liability incurred between January and September 2001, with maturities scheduled until 2009.

In the first half of 2005, the government launched a bond exchange to restructure approximately $81 billion of national public debt (an additional $20 billion in past defaulted interest was not recognized). Over 76% of the debt was tendered and restructured for a recovery value of approximately one third of its nominal value.

On 15 December 2005, following Brazil's initiative, Kirchner announced the cancellation of Argentina's debt to the IMF in full and offered a single payment, in a historic decision that generated controversy at the time (see Argentine debt restructuring). Some commentators, such as Mark Weisbrot of the Center for Economic and Policy Research, suggest that the Argentine experiment has thus far proven successful. Others, such as Michael Mussa, formerly on the staff of the International Monetary Fund and now with the Peterson Institute, question the longer-term sustainability of Pres. Kirchner's approach.

In a meeting with executives of multinational corporations on Wall Street—after which he was the first Argentine president to ring the opening bell at the New York Stock Exchange—Kirchner defended his "heterodox economic policy, within the canon of classic economics" and criticized the IMF for its lack of collaboration with the Argentine recovery.

==== External debt ====
During the government of Kirchner, Argentina and the International Monetary Fund (IMF) maintained a tense relationship. As in Brazil, one of the main measures of his administration was to cancel in advance the entirety of the debt with this international organization for an amount of 9.81 billion dollars. The declared objective of both governments was to end the subjection of their respective national economic policies to the indications of the IMF.

During 2005 the debt swap was carried out, beginning the renegotiations of the bonds that had been in default since 2001. With the crisis of December 2001, Argentina had entered into suspension of payments (default) on its external debt. This default has been the longest in modern financial history and essentially involved the cessation of payments of capital and interest on public debt securities issued by the state (sovereign debt). By the end of 2004 the total external debt reached 178 billion dollars. During 2003 the government of Néstor Kirchner succeeded in negotiating a rescheduling of obligations with multilateral financial institutions (International Monetary Fund, World Bank, Inter-American Development Bank and others) in what was called the Argentine debt swap, obtaining a 75% reduction of debt, the largest percentage reduction in international economic history. Debts equivalent to a nominal value of 62.5 billion dollars were restructured, exchanged for new securities with a nominal value equivalent to 35.3 billion dollars. As a consequence of the restructuring, the peso component of the debt increased from 3 to 37%.

===== Debt swap of 2005 =====
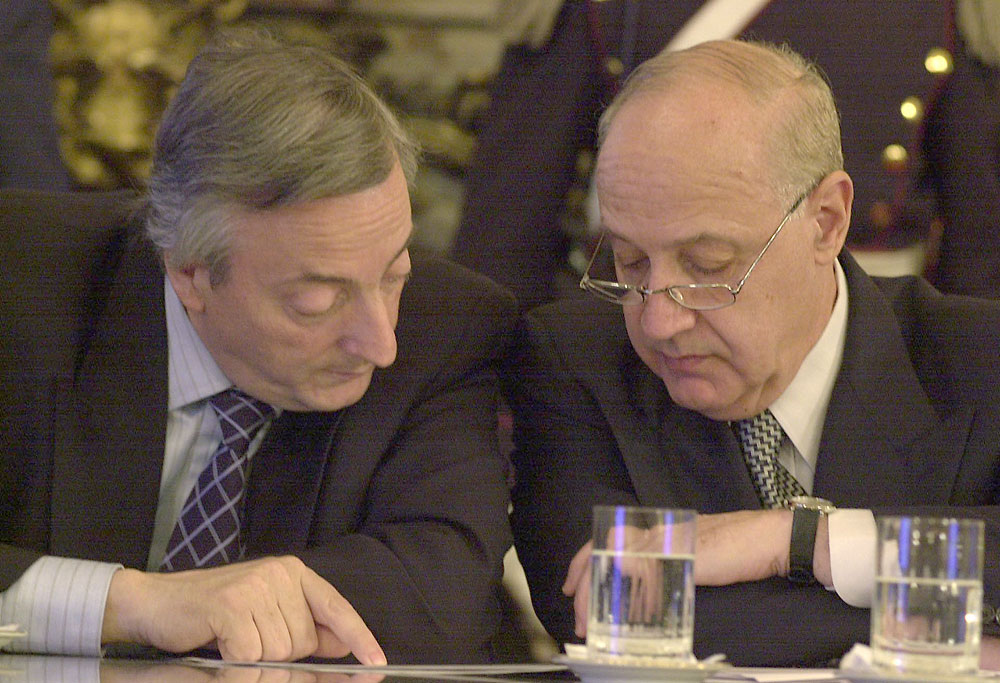
Néstor Kirchner (president of the republic) and Roberto Lavagna (minister of economy).

On 22 September 2003, president Néstor Kirchner proposed an average haircut of 75% of the value of the debt held by Argentine bondholders, which amounted to 94,302 million dollars.

The new securities could be denominated in dollars, euros, yen, or inflation-indexed pesos. The restructuring plan did not include the debt issued after the default, among them the different types of BODEN bonds. These bonds had been delivered to pensioners, public employees and savers who had accepted them in exchange for deposits that had been frozen during the banking "corralito".

However, this initial proposal was rejected by local bondholders.

On 1 June 2004 the government announced the "Buenos Aires Proposal" to restructure the debt payments. On 14 January 2005 the debt swap operation for bonds in default was officially launched.

On 9 February 2005 the Congress passed Law 26.017, known as the "Lock Law" (Ley Cerrojo), prohibiting the Executive Branch from reopening the debt-swap process. This meant that the offer could not be modified or improved, nor could any judicial, extrajudicial or private transaction be carried out regarding the bonds subject to the swap.

===== Cancellation of debt with the IMF and the government of Spain (2006) =====
On 3 January 2006 Argentina eliminated its debt with the International Monetary Fund (IMF) by making an early payment of 9.53 billion dollars, a liability contracted between January and September 2001, with maturities scheduled until 2009. After the traumatic year of 2002, all indicators were favorable for the government: exchange-rate stability ($ 3 to 1 USD), continuous growth in international reserves, decreases in unemployment and poverty indicators, etc. BCRA reserves ended that year with an increase of 4 billion dollars. That is, from 28.078 billion dollars, the Central Bank reserves fell to 18.58 billion and ended the year at 32.037 billion.

On 31 January 2007 the governments of Argentina and Spain signed a debt-restructuring agreement associated with the loan that Spain had granted in March 2001 during the XVI Ibero-American Summit. The debt amounted to 982.5 million dollars and would be repaid over a period of 6 years with an interest rate of LIBOR +140 basis points.

==== Industrial policy ====
During the period 2003–2007, Argentine industry grew at an average annual rate of 10.3% in terms of the Physical Volume Index (IVF), accompanying the dynamics of the economy as a whole. The persistence of growth in the manufacturing sector constitutes a characteristic that stands out compared with other periods of industrial growth.

In July 2004 a memorandum of understanding was signed with the government of Venezuela to revive the shipyard, and in 2005 the contract was signed establishing the construction of two ships of 47,000 tonnes each. The initial contract amounted to 112 million dollars and the first block was assembled on Slipway 1 of ARS on 18 January 2008. Thanks to contracts signed with Venezuela for the construction of oil tankers, the shipyard was able to be reactivated, which implied the immediate incorporation of 250 new workers (including welders and boilermakers).

On slipway two, two additional ships for Germany were constructed. On the third slipway a series of five Multipurpose Ocean Patrol Vessels (POM) was planned. In addition, twelve barges were planned for transporting bulk cargo. On 18 January 2008 construction work began on the first block of the Eva Perón, one of the two tankers contracted by PDVSA.

According to a study by the chamber that groups mining-sector companies, investment of approximately 1.2 billion dollars in 2006 increased to more than 2.5 billion in 2007.

Between 2002 and 2006 Argentine exports grew by nearly 80%.

2007. Exports to		2007. Imports from	
Country	Percentage	Country	Percentage
Brazil	18.78%	Brazil	31.12%
China	9.26%	United States	13.69%
Chile	7.11%	China	10.26%
United States	6.38%	Germany	4.69%

==== Employment ====
Productive performance was driven by the persistent improvement in private domestic spending (consumption and investment) and exports. Argentine exports multiplied more than fourfold; between 2003 and 2006 alone they grew by nearly 80%.

The unemployment rate declined continuously with significant reductions, reaching single-digit levels. Maintaining a competitive and stable real exchange rate played a fundamental role in the decline of the unemployment rate, due to greater incorporation of labor into production. According to a report by CEPAL (Economic Commission for Latin America and the Caribbean), between 2003 and 2008 Argentina reduced the open urban unemployment rate by 53.8%, ranking third among Latin American countries in effectiveness in reducing unemployment during that period.

=== Domestic policy ===
==== Overview ====
When he was elected, Kirchner represented Duhalde in the long conflict between Menem and Duhalde. This allowed him to secure the loyalty of most of the Justicialist Party, but also limited his chances of being seen as a political renovator. The low support in the elections became a problem for him, due to the high presidentialism in the politics of Argentina. The new governors, legislators and mayors took office nearly 6 months after Kirchner. As a result, he sought support from other social forces, such as Hugo Moyano from the General Confederation of Labour (CGT) or the piquetero Luis D'Elía. Although these forces shared a common leader, they had disputes among each other. A political parade on 11 March 2004, in remembrance of the electoral victory of Héctor José Cámpora in 1973, ended in a violent dispute between Moyano and D'Elía. This extrapartidary support, known as transversalism, was combined with the supremacy of the Justicialist Party. The Justicialist congress was summoned on 26 March 2004, and gave the presidency of the party (headed by former president Carlos Menem by that point) to the governor of Jujuy, the kirchnerist Eduardo Fellner. Kirchner refused to run for the presidency of the party himself, in order to give priority and credibility to the transversalist project. Other supports from outside the party were the mayors Aníbal Ibarra (Buenos Aires), Miguel Lifschitz (Rosario) and Luis Juez (Córdoba), from centre-left local parties, and the last two in ongoing conflicts with the local branches of the PJ. As a response, Duhalde, the vicepresident Daniel Scioli and governors as José Manuel de la Sota and Jorge Obeid gathered in a congress and reaffirmed their peronist loyalty, rejecting the transversalism.

Shortly after coming into office, Kirchner made changes to the Argentine Supreme Court. He accused certain justices of extortion and pressured them to resign, while also fostering the impeachment of two others. In place of a majority of politically right-wing and religiously conservative justices, he appointed new ones who were ideologically closer to him, including two women (one of them an avowed atheist). Kirchner also retired dozens of generals, admirals, and brigadiers from the armed forces, a few of them with reputations tainted by the atrocities of the Dirty War.

In the aftermath of a mass shooting on Cabildo Avenue, in Belgrano, Buenos Aires, on 6 July 2006, where 18-year-old Alfredo Marcenac was killed by serial shooter Martín Ríos, and adding to concerns from the 2004 Carmen de Patagones school shooting, Kirchner sent a bill to Congress to approve a disarmament campaign and tighten gun regulations.

==== Social policy ====
At the time he assumed the presidency, the Heads of Household Program for the Unemployed implemented by his predecessor Eduardo Duhalde the previous year was still in force. These plans were converted into the Employment and Training Insurance program of the Ministry of Labour and the Families for Social Inclusion program of the Ministry of Social Development. By 2007, 0.7 million beneficiaries of the Heads of Household Program had obtained registered employment.

During the most acute point of the 2001 crisis, Argentina experienced a dramatic worsening of all social indicators. Unemployment reached its historic record (18.3% in October 2001 and 21.5% in May 2002), and the levels of poverty and extreme poverty increased notably. By the time Néstor Kirchner took office in May 2003, poverty affected 54% of the population and extreme poverty 27%. From this context, he proposed a broad social development program with the aim of reducing social unrest and improving social indicators.

Various analysts described his administration as progressive, social democratic, and center-left in orientation and as part of a new generation of progressive Latin American presidents who were part of the Pink Tide, characterized by strong economic growth, Latin Americanist projects, a multipolar view of international relations, opposed to the unilateralism of the 1990s, a preponderance of social justice and income distribution over the neoliberalism of the previous decade, and the new role of the state in contrast to the Washington Consensus imposed by the IMF.

===== Relationship with social organizations =====
From the beginning of his term, President Kirchner had a closer relationship with Luis D'Elía (of the Federación de Tierra, Vivienda y Hábitat), Emilio Pérsico (of the Movimiento Evita), Juan Carlos Alderete (of the Corriente Clasista y Combativa), and Humberto Tumini (of Libres del Sur). These movements would be a counterweight to the sector of the Justicialist Party. Social movements acquired relevance as never before.

These organizations had presented a series of common demands: to keep existing social plans in force, build housing in poor neighborhoods, drop charges against prosecuted activists, bring to trial those responsible for the deaths of a dozen social leaders during the 2001 crisis, and restore 25,000 cut social assistance plans. Néstor had committed himself to keeping the more than 2.2 million plans in force, but with the commitment to replace them with other social policy instruments.

They also agreed to modify the rules of the National Institute of Associativism and Social Economy (Inaes) so that these organizations could be contracted by the state for public works and the construction of social housing. There was also unanimity regarding the renewal of the Supreme Court, but not regarding payment of the foreign debt, which the CCC rejected.

They also agreed that street demonstrations would not be repressed, but that they also had to change their methods and objectives: from being openly in protest, they had to become supportive of the transformative policies that were beginning to be implemented. He told them: "... It is time for social organizations to become political actors". With that idea, he promised funds to train political cadres; encouraged them to create worker cooperatives; and committed himself to incorporating activists into the government.

The negotiating table was expanded with figures such as Carlos López and Alberto Vulcano (from the FTV), Edgardo Depetri and Hugo Gómez (for the Frente Transversal), Santiago Martorelli (for the Movimiento Evita), Jorge Ceballos (for Barrios de Pie), Néstor Moccia (for Libres del Sur), among others.

==== Labor policy ====
In relation to the economic program, Néstor Kirchner faced the need to stimulate domestic consumption in order not to interrupt the recovery of production that had begun in the final phase of the Duhalde government. This required increasing the purchasing power of wage earners without jeopardizing the competitiveness achieved through the devaluation, which had produced a reduction in labor costs. To this end, the government developed active policies, including wage increases and the raising of the minimum, vital, and mobile wage, as well as the promotion of collective bargaining, which brought together trade unions and business chambers in the Wage Council.

The objective of this set of measures was not only to repair the poor living conditions of the least favored sectors but also to guarantee a growing domestic market that would support the country's attempt at reindustrialization.

On 2 March 2004, Law 25,877 was enacted, repealing the labor flexibilization law known as the "Banelco Law". In the first ordinary session of the year, Congress attempted to remedy the scandal surrounding the passage of the labor flexibilization law four years earlier. By a large majority, Parliament repealed the regulation promoted by the government of then-radical president Fernando de la Rúa, which had been linked to the payment of bribes in the Senate. The bribery scandal triggered the resignation of his vice president, Carlos "Chacho" Álvarez, and marked the prelude to what would become the 2001 crisis and the collapse of the Alliance for Work, Justice and Education.

===== Regularization of work =====
To fight informality, the National Labor Regularization Plan (PNRT) was implemented, aimed at combating unregistered work, verifying compliance with working conditions that guaranteed labor rights and social protection, achieving greater effectiveness in labor and Social Security regulations, and incorporating excluded workers into the Social Security system. For this purpose, a Comprehensive Labor and Social Security Inspection System was created to monitor and oversee compliance with labor regulations throughout the national territory. By 2007 it was observed that out of every 100 new jobs, 83 were formal, unlike in the 1990s when only 6 out of every 100 workers were registered.

In the period 2003/2014, the PNRT inspected nearly 1.4 million establishments, including more than 4 million workers. During the period 2002-2014, coverage of insured employers increased by 100% and covered workers increased by 88%. The historic record of nearly 9 million workers covered by the system was reached. In terms of collective bargaining, the number went from 200 approved agreements, basically company agreements, to nearly 2,000 sectoral and company agreements registered in 2014.

According to records of the Argentine Integrated Pension System (SIPA), between 2002 and 2014 nearly 5.8 million jobs declared in the Social Security system were created nationwide. This implies that total registered employment grew by 91%. In 2003 the rate of unregistered employment affected nearly 50% of wage earners; in 2014 it stood at 31.9%. Unemployment, meanwhile, fell from more than twenty percent to an unemployment level of 6.6% during the second quarter of 2015.

==== Pension policy ====
In 2004, Law 25,994 was passed, which allowed access to a retirement benefit for those who had contributions but were five years short of the legally established retirement age, bringing a notable jump in pension coverage starting in 2006. The year 2007 showed the highest peak in new pensions through the moratorium, reaching 1,050,000. By 2009, the total number of retirees benefiting from the new regime had reached 2,312,000. Official policy had already allowed in 2007 a pension coverage level of more than 95%, the highest in all of Latin America. Although the goal applied to men and women in general, of the 2,700,000 people who gained access to retirement, 86 percent were women. For this reason, the moratorium ended up being known as "the retirement for housewives".

The bill sent to Congress allowed contributions to be completed up to 31 December 2003, with reduction of the debt owed to Anses and a 60-installment payment plan. With those benefits, 99 percent of Argentines were eligible to access a retirement pension. The objective was to incorporate approximately 474 thousand individuals who met the age required by law to receive a benefit but remained excluded because they did not have the 30 years of contributions required. The beneficiaries of the measure were, for the most part, older adults - especially women - who were among the 30 percent of the most vulnerable households.

==== Energy policy ====
In 2006, Kirchner and the governor of Chubut, Mario Das Neves, agreed on the construction of an energy hub in the province, with investments of $1.2 billion to build a gas-fired combined-cycle power plant and a wind farm in the Chubut locality of Dolavon. The thermal power plant was expected to have a capacity of between 330 and 465 MW and, in a first stage, would begin operation in January 2008.

===== Creation of ENARSA =====
In mid-2004, the project for the creation of ENARSA was sent to the National Congress. The initiative was approved with modifications, and was promulgated as Law 25,943. This law established that ENARSA had among its assets the legal monopoly over the exploration and exploitation of the submarine platform of the Argentine Sea, corresponding to the National State under the so-called "Short Law".

Ownership of the company is distributed as follows:

- 97.94% belonging to the National State;
- Chubut, Formosa and Río Negro 0.20% each;
- Buenos Aires, Córdoba, Corrientes, Chaco, Jujuy, La Pampa, Mendoza, Neuquén, San Juan, Santa Cruz, Santiago del Estero and Tierra del Fuego 0.12% each;
- Nucleoeléctrica Argentina S.A. 0.01%.

The company was renamed Integración Energética Argentina Sociedad Anónima (IEASA) in November 2017.

===== Reactivation of the Nuclear plan (2006) =====
In 2006, under the presidency of Néstor Kirchner, a plan to reactivate the nuclear sector was launched, aimed at renewing and reactivating the development of nuclear power in Argentina. The main points of the plan were announced by the Minister of Planning Julio de Vido during a press conference on 23 August 2006:

- Complete the Atucha II nuclear plant, which had been started in 1980.
- Investigate the feasibility of constructing a new nuclear power plant, which would be the fourth for Argentina.
- Extend the operational life of the Embalse nuclear plant, which was originally scheduled to end in 2011.
- Build a prototype CAREM reactor, a low-power fourth-generation nuclear plant.
- Put into operation the heavy water production plant located in Neuquén Province.
- Resume enrichment activities at the Pilcaniyeu Technological Complex.
- Sign an agreement between CNEA and the companies Bacon and Tecnonuclear by which radioisotopes would be delivered free of charge to several public hospitals for use by patients with limited resources.

In 2005, CAREM was selected among a dozen projects of greatest worldwide interest in reactors of that power range by a commission of experts convened by the United States Department of Energy.

==== Education policy ====
===== Primary and secondary education =====
In 2003, the Teacher Salary Guarantee Law and the law establishing a minimum of 180 school days (Law 25,864) were approved. Other important laws were the National Teacher Incentive Fund Law (25,919 of 2004) and the Professional Technical Education Law (26,058 of 2005).

Work was carried out on the reform of the Federal Education Law of 1993 through the Provincial Consultation Plan, which involved more than three and a half million people, including students, parents, teachers, trade unions, representatives of different faiths, and sectors of labor and production, among others. On 27 December 2006, the National Education Law, which had been approved by Congress on 14 December 2006, was promulgated. This law set compulsory schooling at 13 years (from age five through secondary school) for all children in the country and restored the traditional division between primary and secondary school.

In 2006, the Educational Financing Law was promulgated, which granted a gradual increase in the budget for education, science, and technology during 2006 and the following four years, in which investment in the area increased from 4% of GDP to 6% in 2010. In 2006, the Comprehensive Sexual Education Law was approved, which marked a substantial change in the health and care of children and young people.

===== National Education Law =====
On 14 December 2006, the National Education Law was enacted. It was promulgated 13 days later.

===== Comprehensive sex education law =====
The Comprehensive Sexual Education Law (ESI), enacted in 2006 in Argentina, is numbered 26,150 and establishes the right of all students to receive comprehensive sex education content in all schools in the country, from the Initial Level through non-university technical education. This law created the National Comprehensive Sexual Education Program.

Principal and direct antecedents of Law 26,150 are:

- National Law 25,273. Creation of a system of justified absences for reasons of pregnancy. (2000)
- National Law 25,584. Institutional actions that prevent pregnant students from beginning or continuing the school year in public educational establishments are prohibited (2002).
- National Law 25,673. Creation of the National Program for Sexual Health and Responsible Procreation. (2002)
- Universal Declaration of Human Rights. Resolution 217A (III). (1984)
- Convention on the Elimination of All Forms of Discrimination against Women, 18 December 1979. Resolution 34/180 (entered into force 3 September 1981).
- Convention on the Rights of the Child (1989)
- Federal Council of Education. Curriculum Guidelines for Comprehensive Sexual Education. Resolution 45/2008.
- Law 26,061. Comprehensive Protection of the Rights of Children and Adolescents (2005). Regulated by National Decree 415/2006.
- Law 23,798. Declares the fight against acquired immunodeficiency syndrome to be of national interest. 1990.
- Law 23,592. Discriminatory Acts (1988).
- Law 24,632. Inter-American Convention on the Prevention, Punishment, and Eradication of Violence against Women "Convention of Belem do Pará" (1996)
- Instituto Nacional de Juventud (INJUVE) program directed at adolescents and young people.
- How to adapt health services to adolescents. Global standards of the WHO and UNAIDS.

In 2006, National Law No. 26,150 was enacted and a commission of specialists was created to prepare the document Lineamientos curriculares para la Educación Sexual Integral, which detailed the basic and mandatory minimum content to be implemented. This document was approved in 2008.

Following the enactment of the law, the Comprehensive Sexual Education Program was created with the aim of enforcing the right of children and adolescents to receive Comprehensive Sexual Education (ESI) in all public educational institutions, both state-managed and private, from initial education levels through teacher training.

Due to the debate that occurred regarding the legalization of abortion in Argentina, a discussion arose concerning the implementation of the Comprehensive Sexual Education law. During 2018, modifications to the law were proposed, which have not yet been regulated. Among the main proposals was that the law be declared a matter of public order, so that all provinces would implement it compulsorily in both state-managed and private public schools without exception. At the same time, it was proposed to eliminate Article 5, which allows each institution to provide sex education according to its own principles. It also included rights-expansion laws enacted and concepts incorporated during the previous decade.

Conservative sectors in Latin America often align themselves against state policies that guarantee sexual rights and the free exercise of gender identity. This group promotes information contrary to the guidelines contained in the law. Organizations associated with this movement have carried out protest actions aimed at modifying the content of the legislation. Ultimately, the comprehensive sexual education law did not undergo any modifications.

===== Higher education =====
In 2005, the University Infrastructure Development Support Program was created, under which 270 building interventions were carried out. The university budget went from 2,168 million in 2004 to 11,700 in 2007. In terms of GDP, the increase was from 0.48% to 1%.

At the end of his government, the National University of Chaco Austral (UNCAus) was created, with its central seat in the city of Sáenz Peña (Chaco Province). It was created on 4 December 2007 by means of Law 26,335.

==== Science and technology policy ====
On 18 August 2004, in support of national industry, the Software Industry Promotion Law was enacted. Between 2003 and 2012, sales increased 313%, exports 414%, and employment 266%.

The budget of the National Scientific and Technical Research Council (Conicet) increased by 709%. In 2003, the RAICES Program was created with the goal of achieving the repatriation of scientists who had emigrated in previous times. The program was later institutionalized in 2008 through a law during the presidency of Cristina Fernández de Kirchner. By 2013, the repatriation of 1,000 scientists had been achieved, helping to reverse - together with other measures and programs - the historic trend of brain drain that existed in Argentina.

During this time, the country developed the capacity to build its own research satellites, create its own model of fourth-generation nuclear power plant, export small nuclear reactors, and have structured programs in computer science, nanotechnology, and biotechnology.

==== Health policy ====
There was a strengthening of the Primary Health Care strategy through the distribution of kits containing essential medicines and other supplies from the MSAL to more than 6,600 Primary Health Care Centers.

The National Program to Combat AIDS ensured free coverage of 100 percent of medications and supplies for people needing treatment, estimated at more than 25,000 throughout the country. During the presidency of Néstor Kirchner, the hepatitis A vaccine was introduced and coverage of medications necessary for the most common chronic diseases expanded from 40% to 70%.

By 2005, the infant mortality rate had fallen to 13.3 per thousand, standing out as the lowest index of the previous three decades. With this decline, the deaths of 1,069 children were avoided compared with the previous year. In the first six months of 2006, 11 percent fewer children died compared with the same period of the previous year. This decline, recorded since 2002, meant that in 2003 the deaths of 219 children were avoided; in 2004, 908; and in 2005, 1,069, a decrease of 10.1 in infant deaths.

Regarding sexuality and natality, the Health ministry developed a plan based on sex education and the free distribution of condoms and contraceptives. In 2007, the ministry distributed a guide for the care of these non-punishable abortions in order to avoid the judicialization of such cases.

Regarding the budget, the total allocated to health increased from $3,729,495,861 in 2003 to $4,306,527,873 in 2007.

===== Plan Nacer =====
On 15 October 2004, the Plan Nacer was created, which began to be implemented in the northern provinces of Argentina, as they had the most unfavorable socio-health indicators in the country. The plan aimed to reduce the infant mortality rate by half and allocated 1.3 billion pesos to provide health coverage for pregnant women and children in the north of the country.

It included care for the newborn, a clinical check-up at birth, a check-up one week after birth, monthly check-ups (from 1 to 6 months), bimonthly check-ups (from 6 to 12 months), quarterly check-ups (from 12 to 18 months), and nine additional check-ups up to six years of age. The plan included guidelines on feeding and child-rearing, advice on the prevention of accidents, poisoning, and sudden death, dental counseling, ophthalmology, dentistry, and vaccinations. For pregnant women it included dentistry, blood and urine tests, blood group testing, screening for Chagas, syphilis, HIV, among others.

==== Cultural policy ====
Following the arrival to power of President Néstor Kirchner, Torcuato Di Tella was appointed to the position of Secretary of Culture and took office on 25 May 2003. Cultural policy developed through projects aimed at the federalization of culture, with the objective of decentralizing it and making it accessible to the more peripheral areas of the country. In the context of the democratization of these cultural expressions, artistic events, workshops, and talks began to be organized throughout the national territory. This involved, for example, opening the Museum of Oriental Art in Rosario, bringing works of art that had not been exhibited in Buenos Aires to the province of Neuquén, launching the Pre-Columbian Museum, and creating a museum of production and labor in the interior of the country. "I do not want anything new in Buenos Aires", he stated, but rather to "emphasize popular culture, value indigenous culture and circulate it throughout the country, also through popular libraries".

In 2005, he created the series Cafés Cultura Nación, dedicated to promoting discussion talks throughout the country, including in prisons and military barracks. He created SINCA (Cultural Information System of Argentina), with the most complete electronic information on the country's culture. During his administration, the Secretariat promoted the Campaign against the Illicit Trafficking of Cultural Property and organized the first Argentine Congress of Culture in 2006. He also promoted the project of the "Federal Culture Law" and secured funding from the Spanish government to create the Casa del Bicentenario, in the center of the city of Buenos Aires.

==== Media and communications policy ====
In 2005, Kirchner signed a decree suspending the deadlines of radio and television licenses, extending them for another 10 years, and authorized the merger between Multicanal and Cablevisión, endorsed by the National Commission for the Defense of Competition, which approved the union of the companies despite warnings from specialists and consumer associations.

He carried out a plan to modernize and expand the public media. The direction of the channel, taking the BBC as a model, was divided into the areas of fiction and non-fiction. During this period the channel resumed its own production, and after almost a decade it once again produced national fiction.

At the same time, in 2005 he ordered that companies had to provide service through a social tariff in emergency zones of the Greater Buenos Aires area with a reduced subscription. A plan for free connections in public schools in all localities where the companies operate was also required, and depending on the size of the locality and the geographic density, hospitals, police stations, and fire stations were to be connected.

==== Creation of Arsat ====
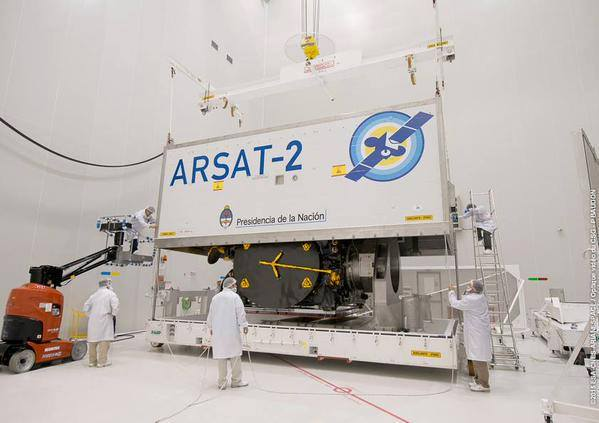
The ARSAT-2 at the headquarters of INVAP.

In August 2004, the government decided to revoke Nahuelsat's license to operate the orbital position of 81 degrees west. It also presented the project for the creation of the Empresa Argentina de Soluciones Satelitales (AR-SAT).

Through the National Commission on Space Activities (CONAE) the government created the "National Space Plan 2004-2015". It was formulated to lead the country toward full mastery of this technology, so that information generated from space could meet the needs of certain areas of the national productive apparatus, as well as prevent and minimize the negative impacts of disasters and emergencies (natural or caused by human action). In addition, it stated that "application activities will rest primarily on a remote sensing program, and on aspects of telecommunications that complement the national and international supply of data, voice and television communications", pointing to the "possibility of conceiving, designing and building, per se or in association with third parties, communications satellites, both geostationary and in low Earth orbit LEO, whether for local provision or for third parties".

Two days before the deadline expired, on 17 October 2005, the date on which Peronism celebrates Loyalty Day, the Secretariat of Communications of Argentina headed by Guillermo Moreno simulated placing another satellite into orbit. In reality it was a Canadian satellite already in orbit that Moreno had rented for 2.1 million dollars from the company Telesat. According to Moreno's version, Telesat had requested a payment of 25 million dollars, but through the intervention of the Venezuelan president Hugo Chávez the operation was allegedly closed for 2.1 million dollars. This information is mentioned by Moreno himself in his book En defensa del modelo, but he offers no proof of the alleged demand by Telesat. The device, called Anik E2, had been launched in 1991 and was already out of service after being struck by a solar storm; in fact it no longer transmitted a signal and was still rotating in an orbit assigned to the Venezuelan state, which had been the satellite's last user. The then president of Venezuela, Hugo Chávez, was complicit in this simulation, intervening to release it from its spectrum and leave it free so that Argentina could rent it. Moreno renamed it "Pueblo Peronista 1" (the name of the basic Peronist unit he himself founded) and chose the Loyalty Day celebration to announce the false news of its launch into orbit. Two days later, on the day the extension expired, the satellite made its first transmission and secured the allocation of the orbit to Argentina. Just 31 days later, PP1 ceased functioning permanently and never emitted a signal again.

In 2006, two years after the project had been presented to the National Congress, Law 26.092 was enacted, creating the Empresa Argentina de Soluciones Satelitales Sociedad Anónima (ARSAT). The law established that 98% of the company's shares would correspond to the Ministry of Federal Planning, Public Investment and Services, and the remaining 2% to the Ministry of Economy and Production.

In the law creating the company, it was specified that ARSAT would have authorization to use the orbital position 81° West longitude and its associated frequency bands granted by the International Telecommunication Union.

The statute establishing the company set as its objective "to carry out the design and construction in the country of geostationary satellites, as well as the launch and commissioning of telecommunications in orbital positions resulting from international coordination procedures".

In October 2006, due to debts incurred and breaches by the company Nahuelsat S.A., the company's shareholders signed two letters of intent with ARSAT transferring NahuelSat's assets and selling the company's shares for the symbolic value of 1 peso.

The position of 72° West remained occupied until early 2010 by the Canadian satellite, until it reached the end of its operational life.

In 2007 the company began operating and providing services using leased satellites. Its main mandate was to contract the engineering and development of satellites with national manufacturing, which would be built within the framework of a project called the "Argentine Geostationary Telecommunications Satellite System" (SSGAT).

In March 2004, by decision of then-president Néstor Kirchner, the National Aerospace Surveillance and Control System (Sinvica) was created, a national radarization strategy to cover all of Argentina and strengthen border security. Until then there were only five radars in the country, all of them located at airports: in Paraná, Ezeiza, Mar del Plata, Córdoba, and Mendoza.

==== Relationship with the media ====
===== Relationship with the Clarín Group =====
While he was president, Néstor Kirchner stated that independent journalism does not exist, since journalists cannot isolate themselves from the company that employs them. According to his view, these companies possess enormous power and are actors in this power struggle, with their own interests and ideology. These media outlets act decisively in the relationship between citizens and politicians. According to Graciela Mochkofsky, (Note: Graciela Mochkofsky, Neuquén, 1969, co-author of Los Farsantes. Caso Cóppola, una crónica del fin del menemismo (1997); author of Timerman. El periodista que quiso ser parte del poder (2003); Tío Boris. Un héroe olvidado de la Guerra Civil Española (2006); La revelación. Una historia real (2007); Pecado original (2011); among other works.) Kirchner interpreted each article, headline and photograph, each word on the radio, as an attack on or support for his administration by the owner of the outlet, with the aim of obtaining economic or political advantages.

On 27 August 2004, the Coalition for Democratic Broadcasting presented its "citizens' initiative for a broadcasting law for democracy", consisting of 21 points and their justifications, which is why it is also known as "the 21 points". On 20 May 2005, Néstor Kirchner renewed the licenses of the main broadcasting media outlets, with the aim of "giving them predictability, seriousness and calm", according to Kirchner's own speech.

===== Relationship with the newspaper La Nación =====
Kirchner made it an objective to integrate the Armed Forces into the democratic process and restore their prestige before society, during his period the dissociation from the National Security Doctrine that had been imposed by the United States on Latin American countries in the framework of the Cold War, through the training of officers from different Latin American countries at the School of the Americas, took place, and which had been in force in Argentina during the dictatorship.

==== Agriculture and livestock policy ====
The Secretariat of Agriculture was headed by Miguel Campos during almost all of Néstor Kirchner's administration. Among the main points of his administration are: the autarky of the ONCCA, the Livestock Plan, the normalization of INASE, and the approval of new transgenic crops.

The government continued the export taxes that interim president Eduardo Duhalde had implemented in 2002. The international price of soybeans fell in 2005 but rose again in subsequent years, until reaching record values in early 2008. Forest and timber production, mainly pines and eucalyptus trees, had been expanding, centered in the Mesopotamian provinces, and productivity also increased considerably. In 8 years, the timber industry increased its production by 132% and the furniture industry by 115%.

Whereas at the end of 2002, grain sowing (oilseeds and cereals) covered 23 million ha, in the 2007/2008 season the area sown with grains reached 30.7 million ha, of which 16.9 million were devoted to soybeans. One of the most notable phenomena that occurred from 2003 onward was the sustained increase in land prices, hand in hand with the increase in profitability, which revalued the price of Argentine farmland.

==== Environmental policy ====
===== Native Forest Law =====
The Law 26,331 on Minimum Budgets for Environmental Protection of Native Forests, or Native Forest Law, is a national law of Argentina that regulates the use of native forests. The law aims to reduce deforestation in Argentina, conserve native forests, regulate and responsibly manage forest use, and promote sustainable forest management. To this end, the law establishes conservation categories for forests, creates a trust fund intended for conservation and the promotion of responsible forest management under a payment for ecosystem services model, and establishes implementing authorities whose mandate is to produce data to monitor the conservation status of native forests, in coordination with the provinces.

After an intense debate, the law was enacted on 21 September 2007 by the National Congress and regulated through Decree 91/2009 in February 2009 by the Executive Branch after demands made by more than 70 environmental organizations.

==== Judicial and human rights policy ====
In judicial matters, President Néstor Kirchner adopted the measure of self-limiting his authority in the appointment of judges, prosecutors, and public defenders through Decrees 222 and 558 of 2003, by requiring the publication of judicial candidates so that all interested individuals and institutions could submit their observations. This further limited the role that the Executive Branch has in the selection of these magistrates after the 1994 reform.

In 2006, at the president's initiative, Congress enacted a law establishing 24 April as the "Day of Action for Tolerance and Respect among Peoples" in official recognition of the Armenian genocide, making the country one of the few to recognize it officially.

After 12 years of delay in complying with the constitutional mandate of 1994, Congress enacted the law regulating executive decrees of necessity and urgency. After an arduous debate, Congress determined that such decrees must be accepted or rejected by an absolute majority of those present in both chambers, but they remain in force while they do not receive parliamentary consideration. The regulation of parliamentary oversight in 2006 marked a difference from the previous period. Their incorporation into the constitutional framework gave them greater legitimacy but also imposed several restrictions: their use was explicitly limited to situations of necessity and urgency; the issuance of DNU was prohibited in four areas of public policy—tax, criminal, electoral, and political party legislation; and a mechanism for parliamentary oversight of DNU was established, although its regulation was deferred to a law of Congress.

His government was characterized by an active state policy regarding human rights, which included the annulment of the Pardons granted by Carlos Menem and the Full Stop and Due Obedience laws, which allowed the trials against the repressors of the last military dictatorship to resume.

===== Human rights =====
Néstor Kirchner made a priority of his presidency to reopen the cases related with the 1970s Dirty War. His main perspective was that the conflict was still ongoing. He started by removing the top military personnel, annulling a decree by Fernando de la Rúa that prevented extraditions, and promoted the annulment of the laws of Full Stop and Due Obedience that benefited the military of the National Reorganization Process in the 1980s.

His government incorporated well-known members of human rights organizations. It also promoted the prosecution of those responsible for crimes against humanity committed during the 1970s by the Triple A and by the National Reorganization Process. To achieve this, his supporters in the National Congress backed the annulment of the Due Obedience and Full Stop laws, which had kept those trials halted since the government of Raúl Alfonsín. This measure was later ratified by the judiciary. He also promoted compensation for the families of the victims of the AMIA bombing.

On 24 March 2004, on the anniversary of the 1976 coup d'état during his presidency, Kirchner ordered the removal of the portraits of the dictators Jorge Rafael Videla and Reynaldo Bignone that were still displayed on the walls of the Military College. On the same day, in an event he later presided over at the former ESMA, Kirchner apologized on behalf of the national state "for the shame of having remained silent during 20 years of democracy about so many atrocities", and signed the transfer of the ESMA to human rights organizations.

That year, after the annulment of the so-called impunity laws, the various prosecutors involved began investigating the events, but the cases involving presidential pardons were stalled until 2006.

In 2005 requests were made to bring the different cases to trial. The various trials, which have been held since 2007, took place throughout the country. The best known cases include: the Simón case, Battalion 601, Christian Von Wernich, Miguel Etchecolatz, ESMA clandestine detention center, First Corps, Operation Condor, Margarita Belén massacre, Trelew massacre, Third Corps, and Barreto, Gonçalves y D’Amico (a branch of the Riveros case).

On 24 March 2004, Néstor Kirchner announced that the ESMA complex would become the Space for Memory and for the Promotion and Defense of Human Rights, which took effect once the facilities were vacated by the Argentine Navy on 20 November 2007. In August 2008 the entire complex was declared a "national historic monument" by Decree 1333/2008.

In 2005 he signed a new decree recognizing the need for compensation and recognition in the case of the victims of the Israeli Embassy bombing. Months later Kirchner sent a bill to Congress to compensate the families of victims of police repression during the events of 19 and 20 December 2001. At the corresponding event he asked that the trials "be accelerated" "for all those who violated human rights", and requested prompt consideration by Congress.

By the end of Néstor Kirchner's administration there were 898 defendants in investigations related to crimes against humanity: 350 of them had been indicted and 8 had been convicted.

In the area of security, he carried out a modification of the Argentine Penal Code concerning crimes involving weapons. A registry of firearm users was established and the requirements and controls for possession were increased. New, harsher penalties were also added for homicide and kidnapping, raising the maximum prison sentence to 50 years through the accumulation of sentences for those convicted of serious crimes (rape followed by death, kidnapping for ransom followed by death, etc.).

In February 2006, he launched a program to assess the issue of human trafficking in Argentina and to prepare a protocol for assisting women who were victims of rape. Within the same framework, a task force was prepared that included specialized brigades to combat child prostitution. He called upon Dr. Eva Giberti to work on drafting the law against human trafficking, which sought to ensure that victims would be active participants and demand that the state detain the rapist.

In March 2006, the program "Las Víctimas contra Las Violencias" ("Victims against Violence") was created, whose primary objective was to assist cases of abuse or mistreatment caused by violence of any kind, in an environment of support, security, and protection of rights. In 2007, the Ministry of Health distributed a guide for the management of these non-punishable abortions in order to avoid the judicialization of such cases.

===== Renewal of the Supreme Court of Justice =====
During the 1990s, the Court was harshly criticized for lacking sufficient independence from the Executive Branch. In fact, many of its members were accused of forming an "automatic majority" that always ruled in favor of the Government's interests. During 2003, the year Néstor Kirchner assumed the presidency, magistrates Julio Nazareno, Adolfo Vásquez, and Guillermo López resigned before the possibility of being removed through impeachment, while Eduardo Moliné O'Connor was removed from office at the end of the same year.

Since 19 June 2003, by presidential decree, all candidates to join the Supreme Court have had to go through a stage of public exposure that must be presented by the Executive Branch in the main media outlets throughout the country. The curriculum vitae of the nominee (or nominees) must be published and promoted on the Ministry of Justice website and may be discussed by NGOs, law associations, universities, human rights organizations, and any citizen who so wishes. After a period of three months, the president, weighing the support and opposition to the candidacy, is authorized to present the nomination to the Senate, which must decide whether or not to approve the person proposed by the president as a member of the Court, requiring a two-thirds majority for such approval.

The renewal of the Supreme Court of Justice during the first years of the Kirchner Government, with the appointment of Dr. Eugenio Zaffaroni in 2003, and Drs. Elena Highton de Nolasco and Carmen Argibay in 2004, was seen and is usually recognized by the opposition as a positive step, which grants greater independence to the Judiciary, balances the Court ideologically, and gives it greater gender parity. Argibay was a feminist, a militant atheist, and supported the decriminalization of abortion, while Zaffaroni (the first to be appointed through the public nomination method) is politically classified as center-left.

==== 2005 elections ====
Kirchner saw the 2005 parliamentary elections as a means to confirm his political power, since Carlos Menem's defection in the second round of the 2003 presidential elections had not allowed Kirchner to receive the large number of votes that surveys predicted. Kirchner explicitly stated that the 2005 elections would be like a mid-term plebiscite for his administration, and he actively participated in the campaign in most provinces. Due to internal disagreements, the Justicialist Party was not presented as such on the polls but split into several factions. Kirchner's Frente para la Victoria (FPV, Front for Victory) was overwhelmingly the winner (the candidates of the FPV got more than 40% of the national vote), following which many supporters of other factions (mostly those led by former presidents Eduardo Duhalde and Carlos Menem) migrated to the FPV.

=== Foreign policy ===
==== Overview ====
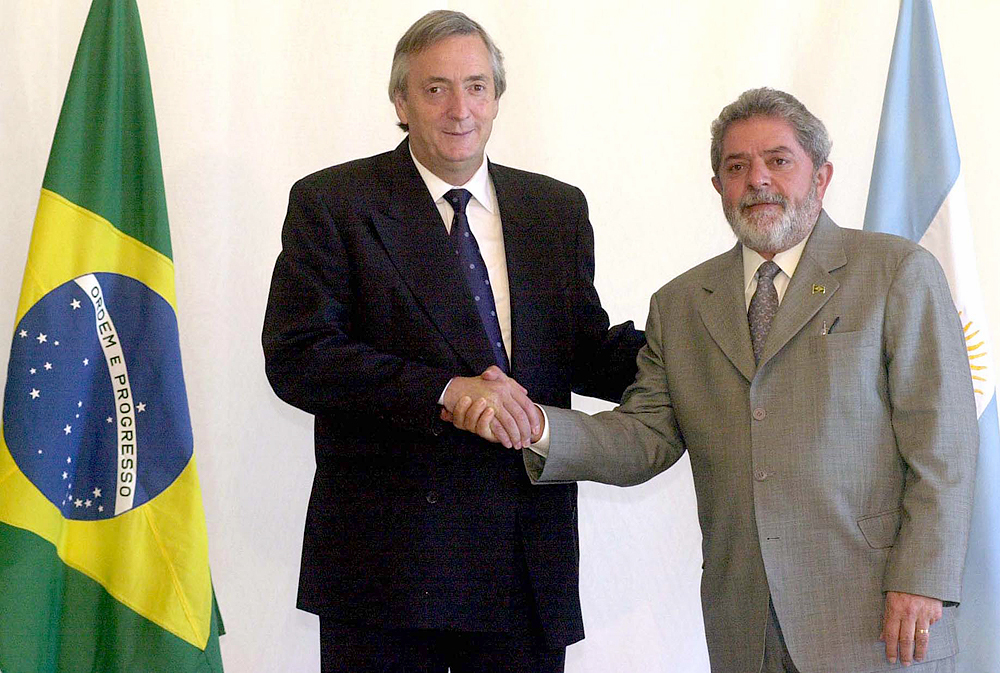
Kirchner meets with Brazilian President Luiz Inácio Lula da Silva in March 2004

Under Duhalde, Argentine foreign policy shifted from the "automatic alignment" with the United States during the 1990s, to one stressing stronger ties (economic and political) within Mercosur and with other Latin American countries, and rejecting the Free Trade Area of the Americas. Néstor Kirchner kept that policy.

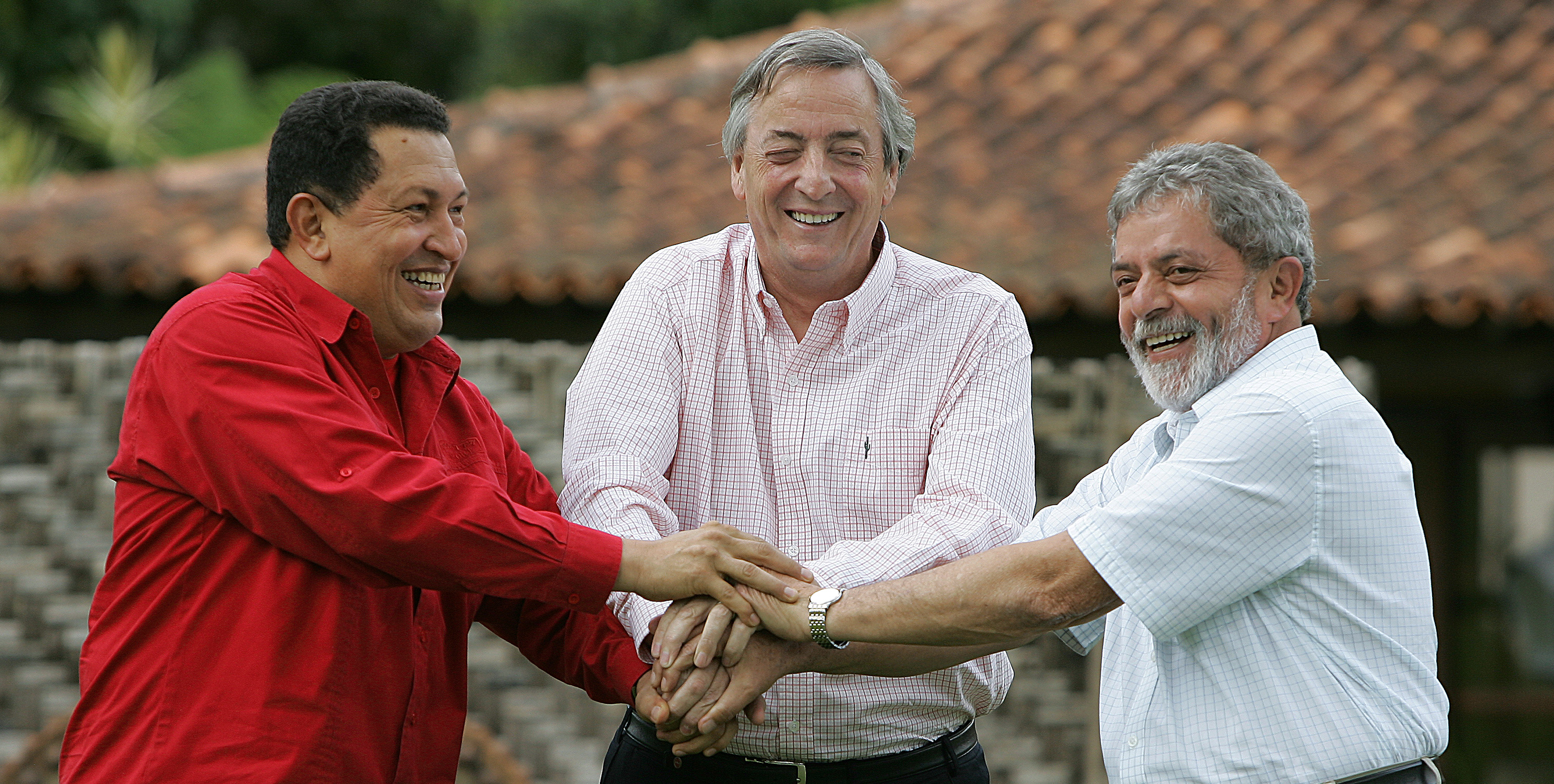
Hugo Chávez (then president of Venezuela), Kirchner and Lula da Silva (then president of Brazil).

At the international level, Kirchner was part of a group of presidents from several countries, together with Lula da Silva (Brazil), Tabaré Vázquez (Uruguay), Evo Morales (Bolivia), Michelle Bachelet (Chile), Rafael Correa (Ecuador) and Hugo Chávez (Venezuela), who for the first time in the history of Latin America raised the possibility of establishing a coalition of countries in the region that would develop policies independent of the hegemonic world powers. In 2005, at the Summit of the Americas in Mar del Plata, the region rejected the United States' attempt to impose the FTAA project (Free Trade Area of the Americas). Hugo Chávez recalled in an interview the moment when President Kirchner addressed George W. Bush, who was sitting in a corner of the hall at that Mar del Plata summit. "Do not come here to bully us", was the phrase of the former Argentine president.

Relations with other countries important to Argentina, such as Mexico, Paraguay, Peru, South Africa and Russia, as well as other closely related issues such as defense policy, the Falkland Islands sovereignty dispute, and policies regarding the South Atlantic and Antarctica, were also addressed. His administration was characterized by a return to an autonomist orientation, in opposition to the "carnal relations" with the United States, reinforced by the strategic alliance with Brazil. In addition, the deepening of Mercosur and relations with associated countries, Chile and Bolivia, were among the new priorities.

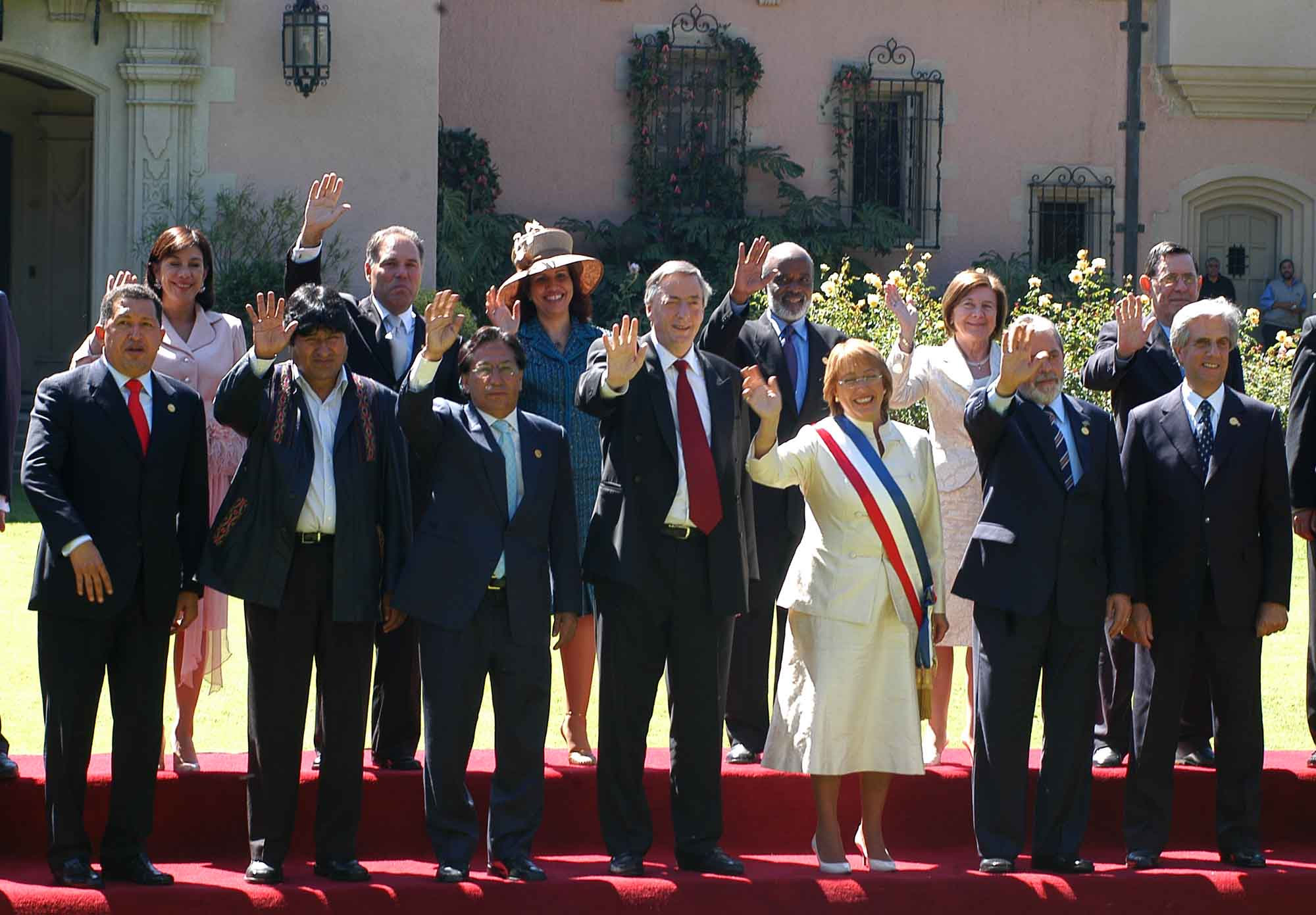
Official photograph of the heads of state of South America taken after the inauguration of Michelle Bachelet as president of Chile in March 2006.

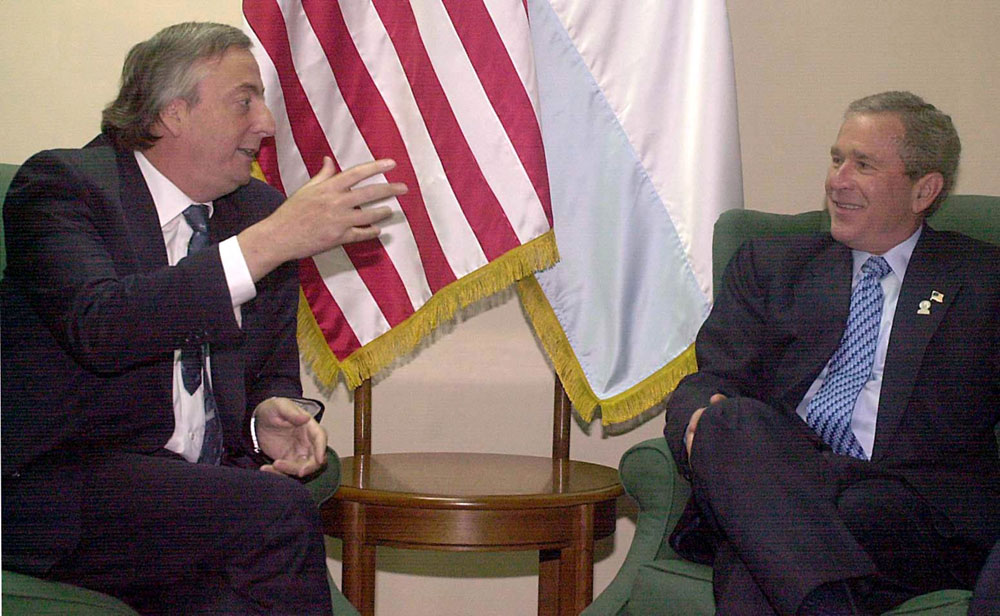
Kirchner and his U.S. counterpart George W. Bush in January 2004.

In his inaugural message to Parliament, President Kirchner set out the general guidelines of his foreign policy. These had a geographic focus, placing the region as the priority, with an expanded domestic market through Mercosur and state intervention through active policies to promote competition and entry. His policy during the first year was based on five axes: multilateral security policy, regional policy and Mercosur, the strategy of opening and diversifying markets, negotiations surrounding the exit from default, and policy regarding the sovereignty of the Falkland Islands.

From participation in United Nations peacekeeping missions it can be observed that, unlike previous periods—those of Fernando de la Rúa and Eduardo Duhalde—there was a significant increase in the number of personnel in these missions, rising from about 560 personnel when Kirchner took office to 1,028 after the deployment of soldiers to Haiti. Regarding the promotion and protection of human rights, in line with his domestic agenda on the matter, he promoted the signing of international instruments: one universal in character, the signing of the "International Convention for the Protection of All Persons from Enforced Disappearance", and another regional instrument, the approval of the Inter-American system for the Protection and Promotion of Human Rights.

Regarding the fight against terrorism, it was placed on the agenda from the beginning, but he advocated multilateralism when he stated:

... there is no acceptable alternative to multilateral action. Only collective debate and the consensus of a majority of countries can ensure genuine action. The only legitimacy for the use of force must come from the decisions of the Security Council

— Néstor Kirchner, speech before the United Nations General Assembly (New York, September 2004).

In economic matters progress was made in opening and diversifying foreign trade. In general terms, the volume of exports grew by almost 100% from 2002 to 2007, rising from 25.65 billion dollars in that year to almost 50 billion in the latter. The trade balance remained positive, while new Asian and African markets were opened. To promote the image of Argentine producers abroad the "Marca País" (Country Brand) was launched through a competition held in 2006 called Concurso para la Identidad Visual de la Argentina Marca, which included several designers from the country. The country brand was conceived as more than an advertising campaign, but also as a comprehensive strategy to capitalize on the country's reputation, leading the country brand ranking in Latin America.

In 2006 a diplomatic conflict arose with Uruguay due to the installation of pulp mills on the Uruguay River, which led activists to block international bridges with the neighboring country. Kirchner refused to repress the demonstrators and even publicly expressed support for them. He also supported, before the International Whaling Commission, the creation of a whale sanctuary in the waters of the South Atlantic. In August 2005, with majority participation of state capital, the company Talleres Navales Dársena Norte (TANDANOR) was established to meet the needs of the state merchant fleet and compete in the field of naval repairs. The new company incorporated naval workshops of the Argentine Navy and two dry docks of the General Ports Administration.

==== Sovereignty of the Falkland Islands ====
During his government, the construction and subsequent installation of the monument to the fallen in the Falklands at the Darwin Cemetery was carried out, which was completed in April 2005.

In 2007 he succeeded in obtaining international support for Argentine sovereignty in the Final Declaration of the VII Meeting of the States Parties of the South Atlantic Peace and Cooperation Zone (ZPCAS), issued in Luanda on 19 June 2007. It was signed by: Angola, Argentina, Benin, Brazil, Cape Verde, Cameroon, Republic of the Congo, Democratic Republic of the Congo, Ivory Coast, Gabon, Gambia, Ghana, Guinea, Guinea-Bissau, Equatorial Guinea, Liberia, Namibia, Nigeria, São Tomé and Príncipe, Senegal, Sierra Leone, South Africa, Togo, Uruguay.

==== Conflict with Uruguay ====
The pulp mill dispute was a dispute between Argentina and Uruguay concerning the construction of pulp mills on the Uruguay River. The presidents at the time were Néstor Kirchner (Argentina) and Tabaré Vázquez (Uruguay). As a diplomatic, economic, and public relations conflict between both parties, the dispute also affected tourism and transportation as well as the otherwise amicable relations between the two countries. The feud was unprecedented between the two countries, which have shared historical and cultural ties.

Proceedings were brought before the International Court of Justice as a case formally named Pulp Mills on the River Uruguay (Argentina v. Uruguay).

== Controversies ==
=== Disappearance of Julio López ===
Jorge Julio López (Latin American Spanish: [ˈlopes]; born 1929) is an Argentine retired bricklayer who was kidnapped during the National Reorganization Process, and disappeared again during the democratic government of Néstor Kirchner after testifying in the trial against dictatorship criminal Miguel Etchecolatz.

=== Skanska ===
In 2005, Skanska was awarded a major contract for the construction of a natural gas pipeline in Argentina. In 2007 the company was implicated in reports of alleged bribery involving illegal payments to government officials linked to the awarding of the project. Six former Skanska managers and a former consultant were arrested for tax evasion. Skanska conducted its own investigation, dismissed seven employees, and worked closely with authorities in relation to the investigation.

== Major legislation ==
- Derogation of the law of Full stop
- Derogation of the law of Obediencia Debida

== 2007 election ==
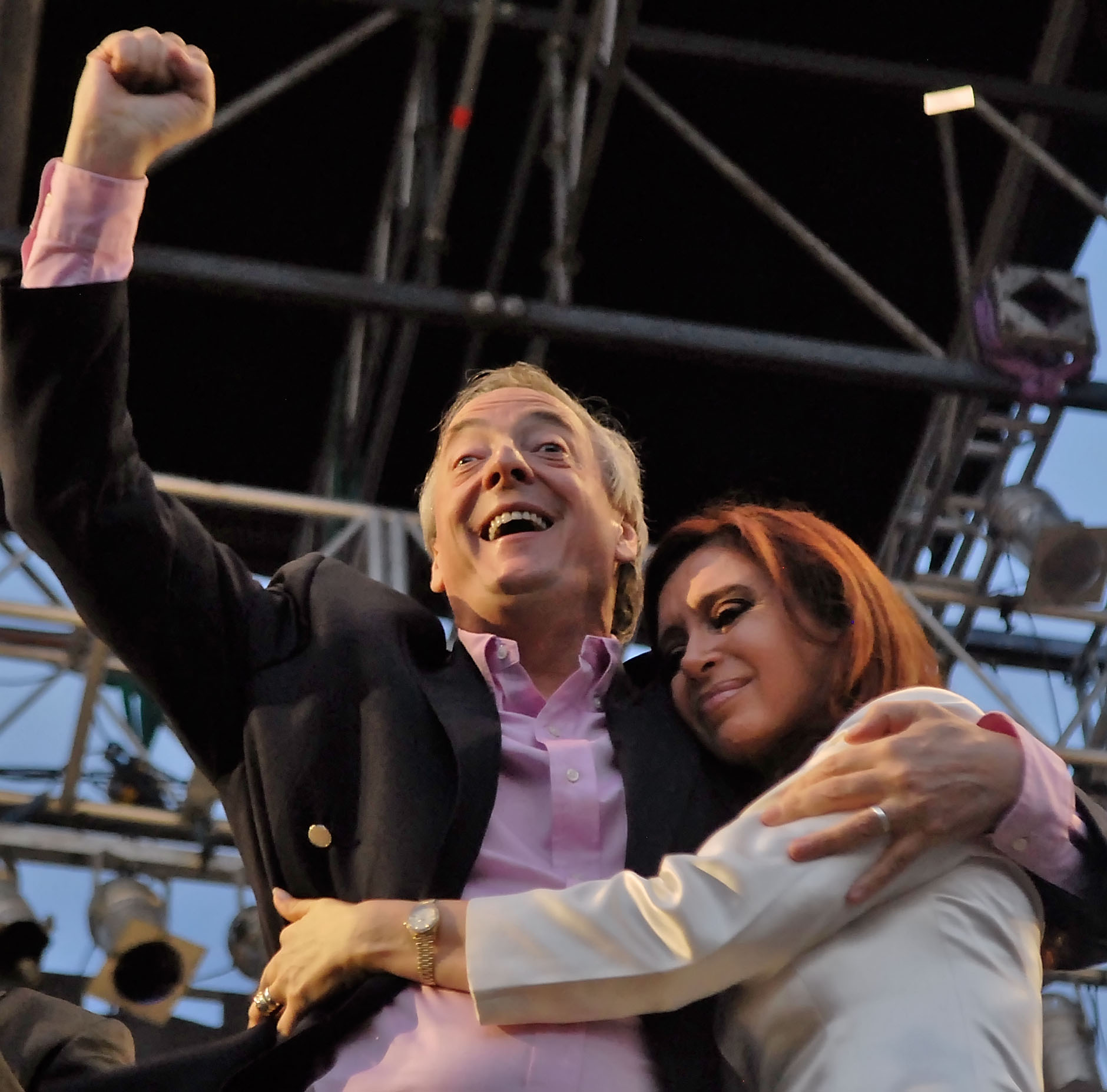
Néstor and Cristina Kirchner at an election-eve campaign rally, 2007.

On 2 July 2007, President Kirchner announced he would not seek re-election in the October elections, despite having the support of 60% of those surveyed in polls. Instead, Kirchner intended to focus on the creation of a new political party.

== Personnel ==
=== Cabinet ===
Office	Holder	Term
Vice President	Daniel Scioli	5/2003 – 12/2007
Chief of the Cabinet of Ministers	Alberto Fernández	5/2003 – 12/2007
Ministry of Foreign Affairs	Rafael Bielsa	5/2003 – 12/2005
	Jorge Taiana	12/2005 – 12/2007
Ministry of Economics	Roberto Lavagna	5/2003 – 12/2005
	Felisa Miceli	12/2005 – 7/2007
	Miguel Peirano	7/2007 – 12/2007
Ministry of Defense	José Pampuro	5/2003 – 12/2005
	Nilda Garré	12/2005 – 12/2007
Ministry of the Interior	Aníbal Fernández	5/2003 – 12/2007
Ministry of Justice and Human Rights	Gustavo Béliz	5/2003 – 7/2004
	Horacio Rosatti	7/2004 – 6/2005
	Alberto Iribarne	6/2005 – 12/2007
Ministry of Federal Planning and Public Services	Julio de Vido	5/2003 – 12/2007
Ministry of Education, Science and Technology	Daniel Filmus	5/2003 – 12/2007
Ministry of Labour and Social Security	Carlos Tomada	5/2003 – 12/2007
Ministry of Social Policy	Alicia Kirchner de Mercado	5/2003 – 12/2005
	Juan Carlos Nadalich	12/2005 – 8/2006
	Alicia Kirchner de Mercado	8/2006 – 12/2007
Ministry of Health and Environment	Ginés González García	5/2003 – 12/2007

== See also ==
- Presidency of Cristina Fernández de Kirchner

== Bibliography ==
- Fraga, Rosendo (2010). Fin de ciKlo: ascenso, apogeo y declinación del poder kirchnerista (in Spanish). Buenos Aires: Ediciones B. ISBN 978-987-627-167-7.
