= Buenos Aires Económico =

Argentine newspaper

- Hacia un Capitalismo Nacional (Towards a National Capitalism)
- Type: Daily newspaper
- Owner: Grupo Crónica
- Founder: Armando Torres
- Publisher: BAE Negocios S.A.
- Editor: Fernando Alonso
- Founded: 1998; 28 years ago
- Political alignment: Kirchnerism
- Language: spanish
- Headquarters: Buenos Aires, Argentina
- Circulation: 10,000
- ISSN: 1851-8176
- Website: www.diariobae.com

Buenos Aires Económico, known also as BAE, is an Argentine newspaper founded in 1998 by Armando Torres as an alternative to the well-established Buenos Aires financial newspapers El Cronista and Ámbito Financiero.

Following poor sales, Daniel Hadad and Sergio Szpolski bought the paper late in 2001. A year later, Szpolski transferred all his shares to Hadad. Then its name changed to Infobae Diario and turned into a general newspaper. In parallel the website Infobae.com was launched. The paper and the accompanying website were the basis on which the media group Grupo Infobae was founded. While the website attracted an increasing number of visitors, the paper edition ran behind in sales. In 2007, Hadad took the decision to keep for himself the website with the new name and reverted the paper edition to its original name as well as putting it on sale. Later in the year Sergio Szpolski bought the newspaper operations and integrated it in his media group.

On November 4, 2010, Spolski sold the paper to the media conglomerate property of Raúl Olmos that publishes the Crónica newspaper. Following the operation the paper adopted its current motto.
