= Martín Ríos (murderer) =

Argentine murderer (born 1979)

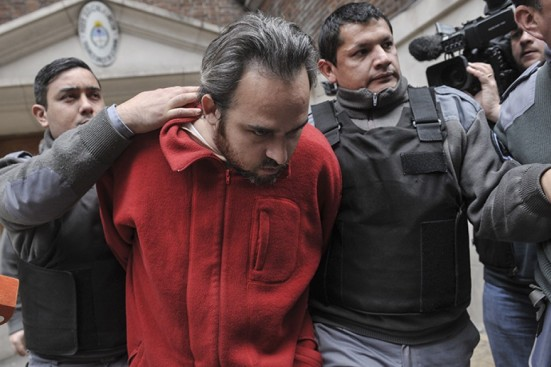
- Ríos exiting a court hearing in June 2014
- Born: 1979 (age 46–47); Buenos Aires, Argentina
- Status: Incarcerated (psychiatric unit)
- Other names: The Belgrano Serial Shooter; The Belgrano Madman; The Belgrano Shooter
- Conviction: Not guilty by reason of insanity
- Penalty: Involuntary commitment

Details
- Span of crimes: 19 June 2005 – 6 July 2006
- Country: Argentina
- Killed: 1
- Injured: 9
- Weapon: .380 ACP Bersa Thunder 380 semi-automatic pistol
- Date apprehended: 14 July 2006
- Imprisoned at: Ezeiza Federal Complex, Ezeiza

Martín Ríos (born January 1979), dubbed the Belgrano Serial Shooter, the Belgrano Madman or simply the Belgrano Shooter, is an Argentine man and serial offender who, between June 2005 and July 2006, committed several shooting attacks in Belgrano, Buenos Aires, ending in a mass shooting which killed an 18-year-old man and injured six others. His case sparked a debate about gun control and mental health issues.

Deemed insane, he is currently held in the psychiatric unit of the Ezeiza Federal Complex in Ezeiza, Buenos Aires.

== Early life ==
Born in January 1979 in Buenos Aires, little is known about Ríos's life, other than his problematic behaviours that led him to commit his crimes. During his adolescence, he exhibited troubling issues like urinating into plastic bottles, defecating in his bathroom's bathtub, sleeping with a knife under the pillow, and threatening his classmates with a small flamethrower. In the early 1990s, when Ríos was 13, he began to consume drugs and drift away from his family. Ultimately, his father, a retired commercial pilot of Aerolíneas Argentinas, decided to take him to sport shooting and hunting with the aim of "approaching to him."

In January 2000, when he turned 21, Ríos applied at the RENAR (firearms regulating body in Argentina) and petitioned a licence of gun ownership. His father sponsored his application and a doctor at RENAR asked for a psychological clearance certification, which because of legal loops, was never made. After getting his licence, Ríos practiced shooting at a local range accompanied by his father, keeping a shooting routine for eight months, where he asked to practice with long guns.

Ríos's legal troubles began in 2001, when he was arrested carrying a gun and drugs. Because he had a legitimate user licence for the gun, Ríos was verbally warned for drug possession and released without charge. He was arrested again in 2004 in Villa Urquiza, when police caught him with alcohol, marijuana, and a gun. In May 2005, a doctor named Mark Garret found Ríos fit to carry guns. Subsequently, his criminal behaviour reached a peak in June 2005 when, at the age of 26, he began conducting rampage shooting attacks in the neighbourhood of Belgrano.

== Crime spree ==
On 19 June 2005, Ríos, armed with a Bersa Thunder 380 semiautomatic pistol, shot indiscriminately at a bus, injuring the driver and a passenger, and causing the bus to crash against two parked cars. He escaped and was not identified.

Ríos's second attack took place on 2 March 2006, when he fired 15 shots against the glass window of a café, injuring 17-year-old Sabrina Sangiao, who was inside having a drink with her 22-year-old boyfriend. On 16 June 2006, Ríos shot several times against a train of the Mitre Line, this time without casualties, only causing damage to parts of three of the carriages. These first attacks of 2006 were not investigated by police.

=== Mass shooting on Cabildo Avenue ===
At around 17:00 (5 p.m.) ART (UTC−3) on 6 July 2006, using carved bullets to inflict maximum damage, Ríos committed a mass shooting on Cabildo Avenue in Belgrano. Alfredo "Freddy" Marcenac was born in Necochea on 19 August 1987, and at the time of his death was an 18-year-old student in his first year of kinesiology at the University of Buenos Aires. In his childhood, Marcenac had been active in swimming for a local club in Necochea, with his mother describing him as a "quiet boy who did not like to talk much and very generous, always wanting to help people's needs." He was walking with other friends on Cabildo Avenue when Ríos opened fire, hitting him three times in the head, abdomen, and thorax. His friends were also hit by gunfire along with three other passers-by. Marcenac was rushed to Hospital Pirovano with serious wounds, dying during an emergency procedure. The victims were aged between 14 and 67 years old.

== Arrest ==
Amid the chaos, Ríos hurriedly walked away and boarded a bus, escaping from the scene. He was arrested eight days later, on 14 July 2006, in an unrelated incident. That day in Munro, Buenos Aires, Ríos's mother asked him to drive her to a clothing store in Olivos, Buenos Aires. He agreed, secretly arming himself with the Bersa Thunder 380 used in the previous attacks and 37 bullets, all concealed inside a fanny pack.

When Ríos and his mother reached the car, they noticed that he had left the keys inside the car and that it was locked. Annoyed, Ríos's mother asked him to stay by the car while she went to fetch a copy of the key. While waiting for his mother, Ríos attempted forcibly to open the car, which caused a neighbour to contact another neighbour who was a retired police sergeant. The man, Mario Attardo, approached Ríos and asked him what he was doing, prompting him to run away. The retired officer chased him, tackling Ríos and subsequently arresting him.

Police and investigators identified Ríos as the Belgrano serial shooter soon afterwards, linking his Bersa Thunder 380 to the mass shooting and the other incidents. Ríos was charged with multiple offences, including the aggravated murder of Alfredo Marcenac.

== Legal proceedings ==
Ríos went to trial twice for these charges, first in 2009 and again in 2014, as his lengthy legal processes focused on whether he was capable of understanding his actions. In 2009, the Tribunal Oral and Criminal of San Isidro, Buenos Aires, acquitted him by reason of insanity; this same acquittal was upheld in 2014 by an upper federal court in Buenos Aires, reimposing the indefinite commitment at a psychiatric penitentiary unit, considering Ríos a danger to himself and others. At the federal circuit, a 2010 appeal was partially successful in requesting another full evaluation of Ríos's state of mind. However, in June 2016, the court of cassation ratified the other verdicts acquitting Ríos by reason of insanity.

In both trials, psychiatrists found Ríos to be legally insane, arguing that he suffered from schizophrenia and delusions fuelled by his drug addiction. Psychiatrist for the state, Ana María Arias, dissented in the two evaluations, calling Ríos a "psychopath who simulates (his madness) and killed in cold blood." Arias added that Ríos understood perfectly the scope and consequences of his actions. In court, Ríos never said anything, and did not appear to acknowledge the judges, even when they called him by name, instead rocking back and forth. In the closing argument of the 2014 trial, the prosecution asked for a sentence of 18 years in prison, while lawyers representing Marcenac's parents asked for life imprisonment.

The rest of the medical board concluded in majority on both occasions that Ríos was not a psychopath because "(he) did not act with sadism, did not plan the shootings, nor cared about concealing (the crimes)." One of the psychiatrists diagnosed Ríos with borderline personality disorder, with the consenting doctors explaining that no motive could be established for the attacks because "(Ríos) does not talk about that." The majority of the board also pointed to Ríos's "flat emotionality, childish argumentation, paranoid temper, poor speech skills, tendency to isolate himself, abulia, and slow thinking." Ríos was further described as dysfunctional, with forensic psychiatrists finding him with "no capacity to work or study, scarce interest in recreational activities" as well as having "no interest in social or sexual relationships" finding that the latter was heavily influenced by puritanical thoughts and concluding that Ríos showed infantile life projects and family dependence.

The state and Marcenac's family appealed the verdict, with both sides asking for the sentence of life imprisonment in both trials. Court hearings and appeals were finalised by the court of cassation's ruling of acquittal in 2016.

In an interview with Infobae, Marcenac's parents Adrián Marcenac and Mónica Bouyssede said that they always insisted that Ríos is not mentally ill, with Buoyssede urging a debate to differentiate psychosis from psychopathy, arguing that society tends to confuse the terms. The couple added that Ríos knew how to simulate mental illness symptoms, such as disorganising his speech and frequently alleging that he was the subject of a persecution, with Marcenac saying that the courts treat Ríos as a "kindergarten boy who misses his parents."

The Marcenac family's lawyers appealed over the years at different courts, asking for reevaluations, considering that Ríos does not suffer from a classical mental illness which impedes him from knowing right from wrong, pointing instead to an antisocial personality disorder which, under legal terms, does not mean insanity. The Marcenacs agreed with the prosecutors in charging Ríos with a special crime in Argentine criminal law which aggravates penalties for "homicides committed for pleasure." (Note: Article 80 of the Penal Code of Argentina aggravates the punishment for murder if the motive can be established as one of "pleasure, greed, racial, religious, or gender hatred, as well as for sexual orientation, gender identity, and expression.")

As of November 2025, Ríos remained incarcerated in the psychiatric unit of the Ezeiza Federal Complex in Ezeiza, Buenos Aires, having been denied transfer to a nursing or group home by Judge Axel López, who concluded that Ríos poses a danger to himself and others, with a federal court concurring in opinion with López.

== Aftermath ==
Mark Garret, the doctor who certified Ríos as healthy to own a gun, was sentenced to probation and professional disciplinary action.

The murder of Alfredo Marcenac caused shock in society and reaction from President Néstor Kirchner, who sent a project bill to Congress to approve a national disarmament campaign.

In the years that followed the murder of their son, the Marcenacs founded a civil association to promote the voluntary handover of firearms by private citizens and demanding more regulations in gun laws. The association's disarmament campaign finished with the destruction of more than 350,000 weapons previously owned by common citizens. In December 2016, Televisión Pública aired a short film titled Desarme chronicling Marcenac's case and the Marcenac Civil Association work with survivors of the Carmen de Patagones school shooting to pursue a disarmament and gun control in Argentina. Desarme was awarded a Latin American prize that same year.

Following the 2016 ruling by a federal court, completely acquitting Ríos by reason of insanity, his lawyer Ángel Ramallo was interviewed by Clarín, where he said that Ríos was a "sick man" whose parents, deniers of their son's mental illness, did not want to get preoccupied with providing him medical attention, labelling Ríos's mother as "borderline" and his father a "tyrant." Ramallo, who knew Ríos before the crime spree, representing him on the drug charges in 2004, assured that his client will never get out of the psychiatric penitentiary unit, arguing that his insanity has been proven several times, and that Ríos's schizophrenia is not responsive to any treatment nor improvement.

In November 2017, Marcenac's parents published an open letter, warning that Ríos had applied for a loosening of his psychiatric controls, including a transfer to a non-penitentiary mental hospital. The Marcenacs called on society to join them in appealing Ríos's attempt at getting these benefits. The reviewing panel ultimately denied all petitions by Ríos, claiming that he posed a risk to himself and others.

Adrián Marcenac, Alfredo's father, died in December 2024. Shortly before his death, Marcenac had been active in the press opposing president Javier Milei's attempts to loosen gun regulations in Argentina and eliminate restrictions to acquire weapons. He had also fiercely opposed other political attempts to soften gun control in Argentina, including in 2018, when Secretary of Security Patricia Bullrich said that those who wanted to be armed should be allowed to do it. Marcenac called Bullrich's comments as "enormously grave" for Argentine society.

== Summary of attacks ==
As referenced by a November 2025 note on Infobae and a previous one on the same site of September 2020.

Target	Age	Date of attack	Notes
Oscar Jorda and Fabián Augeri	33 and 37	19 June 2005	Ríos shot at a bus, injuring Jorda and Augeri, who were the driver and a passenger, respectively. Jorda was injured when a bullet struck his shoe while Augeri sustained a gunshot wound to his left shoulder blade.
Sabrina Sangiao	17	2 March 2006	Sangiao, who was inside a café with her boyfriend, was injured by gunfire as Ríos shot from outside before escaping. This case was not investigated
Two Mitre Line trains	–	16 June 2006	Two carriages were severely damaged by gunfire

=== 6 July 2006 mass shooting ===
Victim	Age	Details
Alfredo Marcenac	18	Killed. Marcenac was walking with friends when he was struck three times by Ríos.
María José Álvarez	14	Passer-by. Only female injured in the attack, shot in her left elbow
Martín Cristian Thiessen	18	Marcenac's friend. Severe gunshot wound in one of his legs
Juan Pablo Arrate	19	Marcenac's friend. Injured in the left thigh
Pablo Jorge Jagoe	28	Marcenac's friend. Injured in one foot
Jorge Marchesotti	67	Passer-by. Injured in the groin and left thigh
Diego Antonio Claros	32	Passer-by. Injured in his right arm
