= Solich =

Solich is a surname. Notable people with the surname include:

- Frank Solich (born 1944), American football player and coach
- Manuel Fleitas Solich (1900–1984), Paraguayan football player and coach
- Rafael Solich (born 1988), Argentine school shooter
