= Argentine Anti‑Terrorism Law =

2007 anti-terrorism legislation in Argentina

The Argentine Anti‑Terrorism Law (Spanish: Ley Antiterrorista) is a statute enacted by the Argentine National Congress on 13 June 2007. It was initially developed in response to recommendations from the Financial Action Task Force (FATF/GAFI) and aimed primarily to combat money laundering as a method of terrorism financing. A central and controversial provision of the original law criminalized mere membership in a group with terrorist objectives.

On 22 December 2011, the law was significantly amended. The controversial membership clause was repealed and replaced with a new provision—Article 41 quinquies of the Penal Code. This article mandates that the standard prison sentence for any crime be doubled if the offense was committed with the intent to terrorize the population or to compel national, foreign, or international authorities to perform or abstain from an act.

A further reform on 19 March 2017 introduced additional aggravating circumstances and expanded the legal definition of crimes associated with terrorism.

== Role of the Financial Information Unit (UIF) ==
The Anti-Terrorism Law also redefined the powers of the Financial Information Unit (UIF). Article 4 of the law amended the UIF's mandate, tasking it with analyzing, processing, and transmitting information to prevent and combat money laundering and terrorism financing. The UIF is authorized to investigate activities related to a range of crimes, including:

- Drug trafficking (Law 23,737)
- Arms smuggling (Law 22,415)
- Organized criminal and terrorist groups (Articles 210 and 213 of the Penal Code)
- Associations formed to commit crimes for political or racial motives
- Fraud against the public administration
- Various crimes against public administration (as defined in Chapters VI–IX bis, Title XI, Book II of the Penal Code)
- Child prostitution and pornography (Articles 125, 125 bis, 127 bis, 128)
- Financing of terrorism (Article 213 quarter of the Penal Code)

According to Article 19 of the law, when the UIF's analysis reveals strong evidence of money laundering or terrorism financing, it is obligated to refer the case to the Public Prosecutor's Office for potential legal action.

== Criticism ==
The law has faced significant criticism, particularly concerning the broad nature of the "intimidation of authorities" as a defining element of terrorism. Critics argue that this vagueness allows for harsher penalties to be applied based on an expansive interpretation of terrorist acts. Additional objections have been raised regarding the power to freeze assets with minimal judicial oversight.

Nobel Peace Prize laureate Adolfo Pérez Esquivel has been a prominent critic, asserting that the law violates fundamental human rights. He has drawn comparisons between its potential for abuse and the impunity laws enacted during the government of Raúl Alfonsín.
