= Radio 10 (Argentina) =

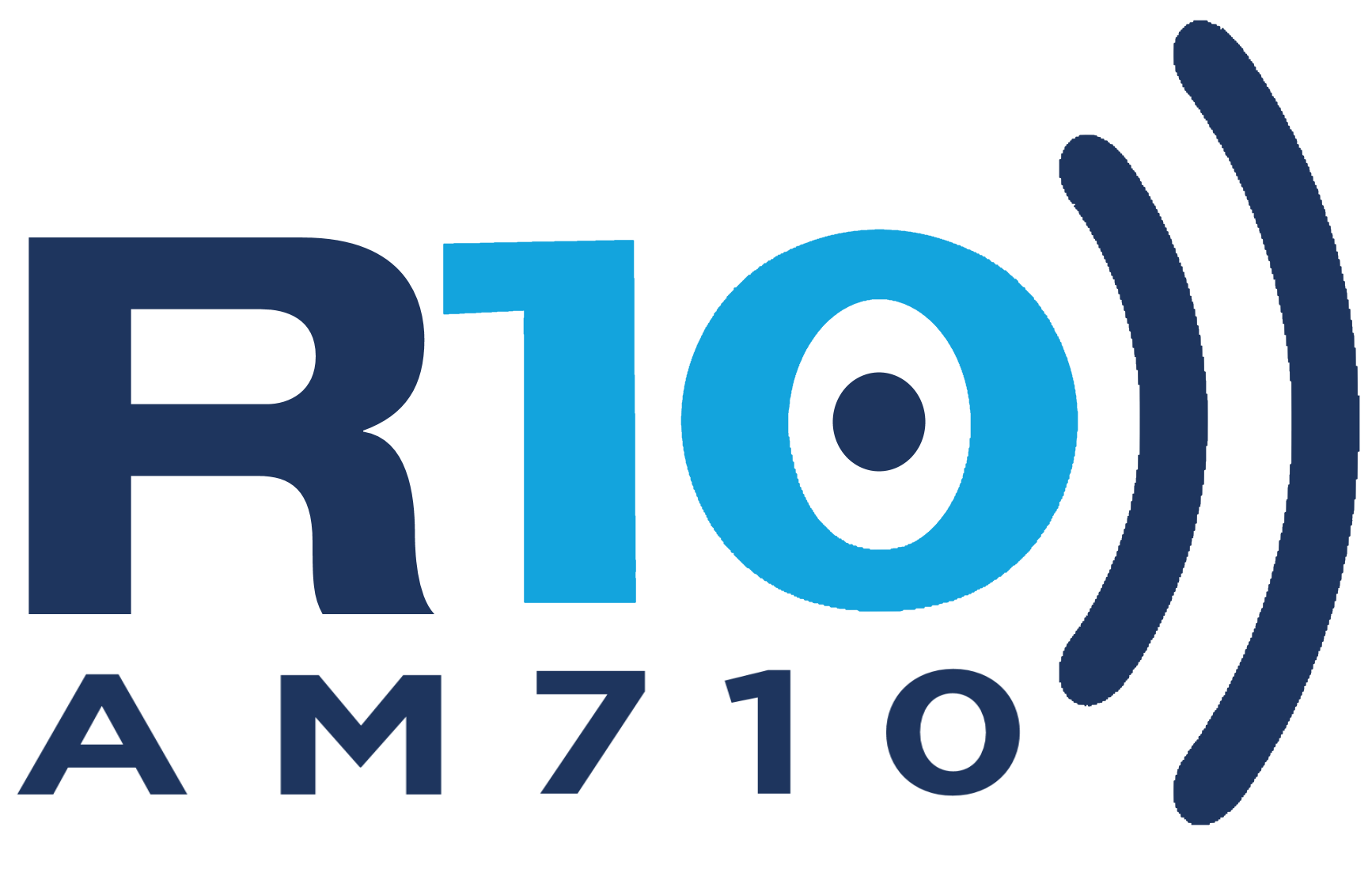

Argentina
- Broadcast area: Buenos Aires
- Frequency: 710 kHz
- Branding: Radio 10

Programming
- Format: Talk radio

Ownership
- Owner: Daniel Hadad

History
- First air date: 1998
- Call sign meaning: Unknown

Technical information
- Class: A
- ERP: 100 kW

Links
- Website: radio10.com.ar

Radio 10 is an Argentine talk radio station. It broadcasts from Buenos Aires on the 710 kHz with an effective radio power of 100 kW. It has affiliates in the country. It is owned by the businessman and journalist Daniel Hadad.

== Shows ==
Three-minute News bulletins branded as "Radio 10 Siempre Noticias" air every half-hour. They last 3 minutes, and they include latest traffic information and weather forecasts.

In 1999, the station began shows like "El Oro y el Moro", hosted by Oscar Gónzalez Oro. The program combines news, humour and popular songs sung by the host. The program is currently airing.

Another show is "El Ángel", hosted by "Baby" Etchecopar. The program basically consists of Etchecopar taking phone-ins from the audience.

== Schedule ==
=== Monday to Friday ===
- Los mejores de siempre ("The best ever", Monday 12-1 am) Roberto Rinaldi.
- La Noche de Radio 10 ("The night of Radio 10", Tuesday-Friday 12-2 am) Marcelo Echeverri.
- Hacete cargo ("Take charge", Monday 1-3 am) Claudia María Domínguez.
- Antes del amanecer ("Before dawn", Monday 3-5 am / Tuesday-Friday 2-5 am) Gustavo Romero.
- Siempre Noticias ("Always News", 5-6 am) Paula Marussich.
- Mañana Sylvestre ("Sylvestre Morning", 6-10 am) Gustavo Sylvestre with David Cufré, Gabriela Rádice, Pablo Ladaga, Eugenia Karall and Ariel Sak.
- Buenos Vecinos ("Good Neighbours", 9 am-12 pm) Pablo Duggan with Verónica Carelli, Gringo Cingolani, Patricio Blanc, Jorge Chamorro and Mariano Ojeda.
- Secreto de sumario ("Secret of summary", 12-3 pm) Darío Villarruel with Nora Acosta, Gabriela Bentolila and Ignacio Prieto
- Vuelta de rosca ("Thread turn", 3-6 pm) Tomás Méndez with Alejandra Dirassar, Vanesa Petrillo, Alejandra Quevedo, Esteban Sassi, Osvaldo Granados, Donato Spaccavento and Ezequiel López.
- ¿Quién dijo que es tarde? ("Who said it's late?", 6-9 pm) Antonio Novas with Elio Rossi, Ayelén Velázquez, Belén Castellino and Miguel Ángel Pierri.
- Ahora sí ("Yes now", 9 pm-12 am) Sebastián Basalo and Ana Gudiño.

=== Saturday ===
- La Noche de Radio 10 ("The Night of Radio 10", 12-2 am) Marcelo Echeverri.
- Despiertos ("Awake", 2-6 am) Sergio Marino.
- Palabra de Campo ("Word of Field", 6-7 am) Daniel Aprile.
- Fuera de agenda ("Off schedule", 7-10 am) Antonio Fernández Llorente.
- Llegó el Sábado ("I Arrive on Saturday", 10 am-1 pm) Pablo Ladaga.
- Bien Arriba ("Well Up", 1-3 pm) Carlos Monti.
- Animales de 10 ("Animals on 10", 3-5 pm) Juan Enrique Romero.
- Mejor hablar... ("Better talk...", 5-8 pm) Sergio Elguezábal.
- Frecuencia 710 ("Frequency 710", 8-11 pm) Claudio María Domínguez.
- Planeta Nebbia ("Planet Nebbia", 11 pm-12 am) Litto Nebbia.

=== Sunday ===
- Demoliendo Fronteras ("Demolishing Borders", 12-2 am) Pedro Brieger and Francisco Pesky.
- Despiertos ("Awake", 2-6 am) Sergio Marino.
- Palabra de Campo ("Word of Field", 6-7 am) Daniel Aprile.
- Informate bien ("Inform yourself well", 7-10 am) Romina Calderaro and Luciano Galende.
- En fin de la Metáfora ("In order of the Metaphor", 10 am-1 pm) Iván Schargrodsky.
- Todo por Hacer ("Everything To Do", 1-3 pm) Jorge Lafauci.
- Común y Corriente ("Common and Current", 3-5 pm) Néstor Dib.
- Desde el conocimiento ("From knowledge", 5-6 pm) Luciana Rubinska.
- Rayos X ("X-Rays", 6-9 pm) Raúl Kollman.
- ¡Qué Noche Teté! ("What a Night, Teté!", 9 pm-12 am) Teté Coustarot.

== Transmitter ==
The station uses a directional antenna consisting of 2 masts. The main mast is a half-wave radiator and may be among the tallest man-made structures in Argentina.
