= Daniel Hadad =

Argentine businessman (born 1961)

- Born: November 28, 1961 (age 64); Buenos Aires, Argentina
- Occupations: Businessman, lawyer, journalist
- Spouse: Viviana Zocco
- Children: 4

Daniel Hadad (born November 28, 1961) is an Argentine lawyer and businessman involved in telecommunications and media.

He is the founder of Infobae, one of the most read Spanish-language online newspapers worldwide. In addition to owning Radio 10. He is recognized as one of the leading innovators of radio and digital journalism in Argentina, and internationally as a driving force behind the transformation of Spanish-language journalism.

== Biography ==
Daniel Hadad was born in Buenos Aires in 1961 to a family of Syrian origin. He holds degrees in law and journalism from the Catholic University of Argentina and completed postgraduate studies at the University of Navarra in Spain. He received a scholarship from the Fundación Universidad Río de la Plata to continue his education in Washington, D.C.

He is married to businesswoman Viviana Zocco and has four children.

Hadad has founded and acquired multiple radio stations, online outlets and television channels in Argentina, including Radio 10, the online newspaper Infobae, the television channel El Nueve (acquired July 2002), and the news channel Canal 5 Noticias.

== Career ==
=== Journalism ===
Hadad began his career as a special writer at Editorial Atlántida and as a field reporter for the newscast Teledós Informa, hosted by Pinky, in 1988. He later worked as a producer for journalist Bernardo Neustadt. He went on to host several television programs on América TV and ATC (now Televisión Pública), including En voz alta, H&L, La trama y el revés, and El primero de la semana. During Argentina's 2001 political and economic crisis, he gained prominence as host of Después de hora (DH), a program that covered events in real time and established him as a notable figure in political television analysis.

=== Radio 10 ===
Hadad founded Radio 10 in 1998; it went on air on January 4, 1999, and went on to sustain national audience shares exceeding 40%.

=== Infobae ===
In 2002, Hadad founded the online newspaper Infobae,. Infobae went on to launch editions in Mexico, Colombia, Spain, and elsewhere in Latin America, becoming the most-read Spanish-language news site in the world.

=== El Nueve (Canal 9) ===
In 2005, he revamped the channel's programming with Showmatch, the telenovela Los Roldán, and the comedy program No hay dos sin tres, bringing the channel to second place among Argentina's most-watched over-the-air networks. In early 2007, Hadad sold 80% of the channel's shares to Mexican businessman Ángel González, retaining only editorial direction over its news content; he sold the remaining 20% later that year and left the channel.

=== C5N ===
Combining radio, television, and digital news operations in a single newsroom, C5N was Argentina's first multimedia newsroom, and it led cable news ratings alongside TN.

On April 26, 2012, Hadad sold C5N and radio stations Radio 10, Vale 97.5, Mega 98.3, Pop Radio 101.5, and TKM to Grupo Indalo, led by businessman Cristóbal López. In 2017, Hadad said he had faced pressure from the government of Cristina Fernández de Kirchner to sell those outlets, stating that he had earlier declined a request to dismiss two journalists, Marcelo Longobardi and Luis Novaresio, who were critical of the administration; he said the federal tax authority (AFIP) subsequently opened a case against him.

== Awards and honors ==
In 2019, the Buenos Aires city legislature declared Hadad an Illustrious Citizen of the City of Buenos Aires. He has also been recognized for his career by the University of Buenos Aires.

In 2026, Hadad was named an honorary doctor (doctor honoris causa) by the Universidad Nacional de La Matanza, in recognition of his impact on the transformation of journalism in Latin America.

He is a member of the Executive Board of the International Press Institute.
