= Infobae =

Argentine news website

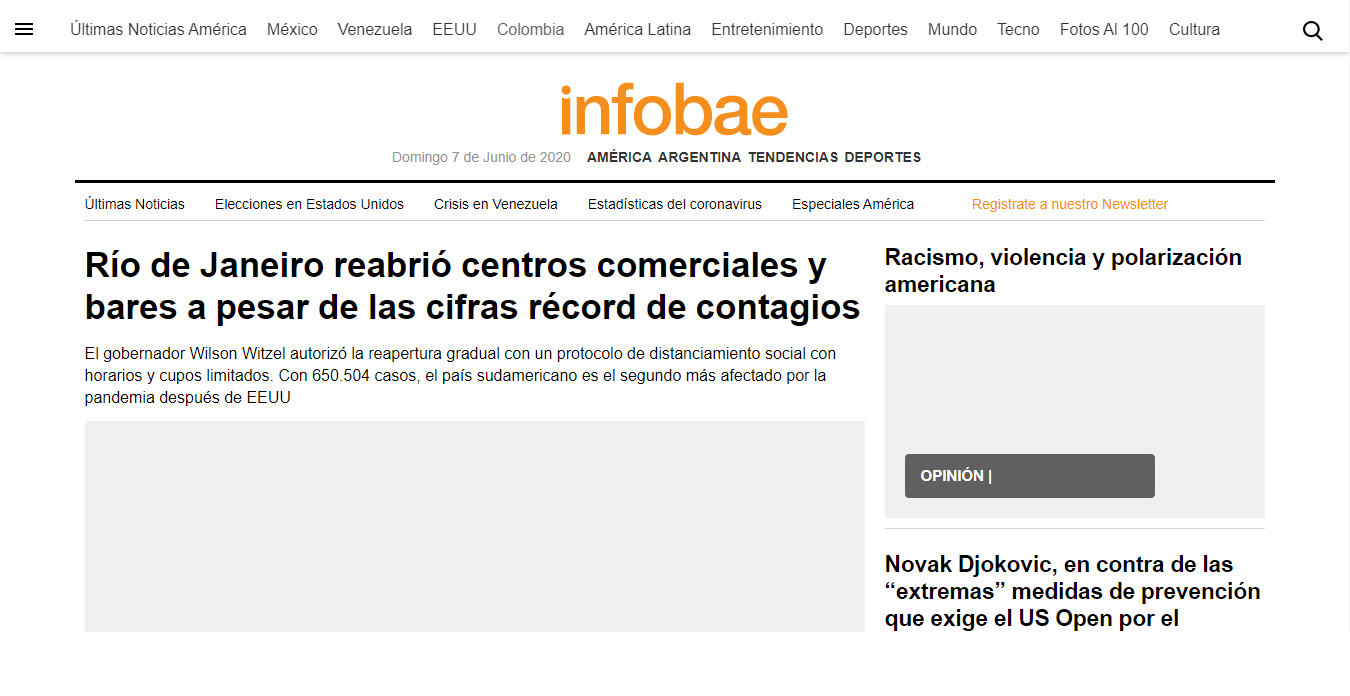
- Front page, 6 June 2020
- Type: Online newspaper
- Owner: Daniel Hadad
- Political alignment: Center-right; Anti-Kirchnerism; Anti-Peronism
- Language: Spanish
- Website: infobae.com

Infobae is an international Argentine online newspaper. It was launched in 2002 by businessman Daniel Hadad, with the original headquarters in Buenos Aires. The company expanded globally with local editions in New York City, Mexico City, Miami, Bogotá, São Paulo, Lima, and Madrid, all led by Marcos Stupenengo. The expansion increased Infobae's international audience, becoming one of the most read Spanish-language online newspapers worldwide.

== Censorship in Venezuela ==
On 10 October 2014, Conatel, the Venezuelan National Commission of Telecommunications, blocked access to Infobae in Venezuela after Infobae published photos of the corpse of the recently murdered United Socialist Party of Venezuela (PSUV) member Robert Serra. Conatel said the publication was against Venezuelan law, was dishonorable to Serra and his family, and that it constituted "psychological warfare". Infobae accused the Maduro government of a double standard for what it described as the promotion and publicising of photos of dead Palestinian children in order to accuse Israel of war crimes.

== See also ==
- Buenos Aires Económico
- Censorship in Venezuela
