= Forestry in Argentina =

Sector in the Argentina's economy

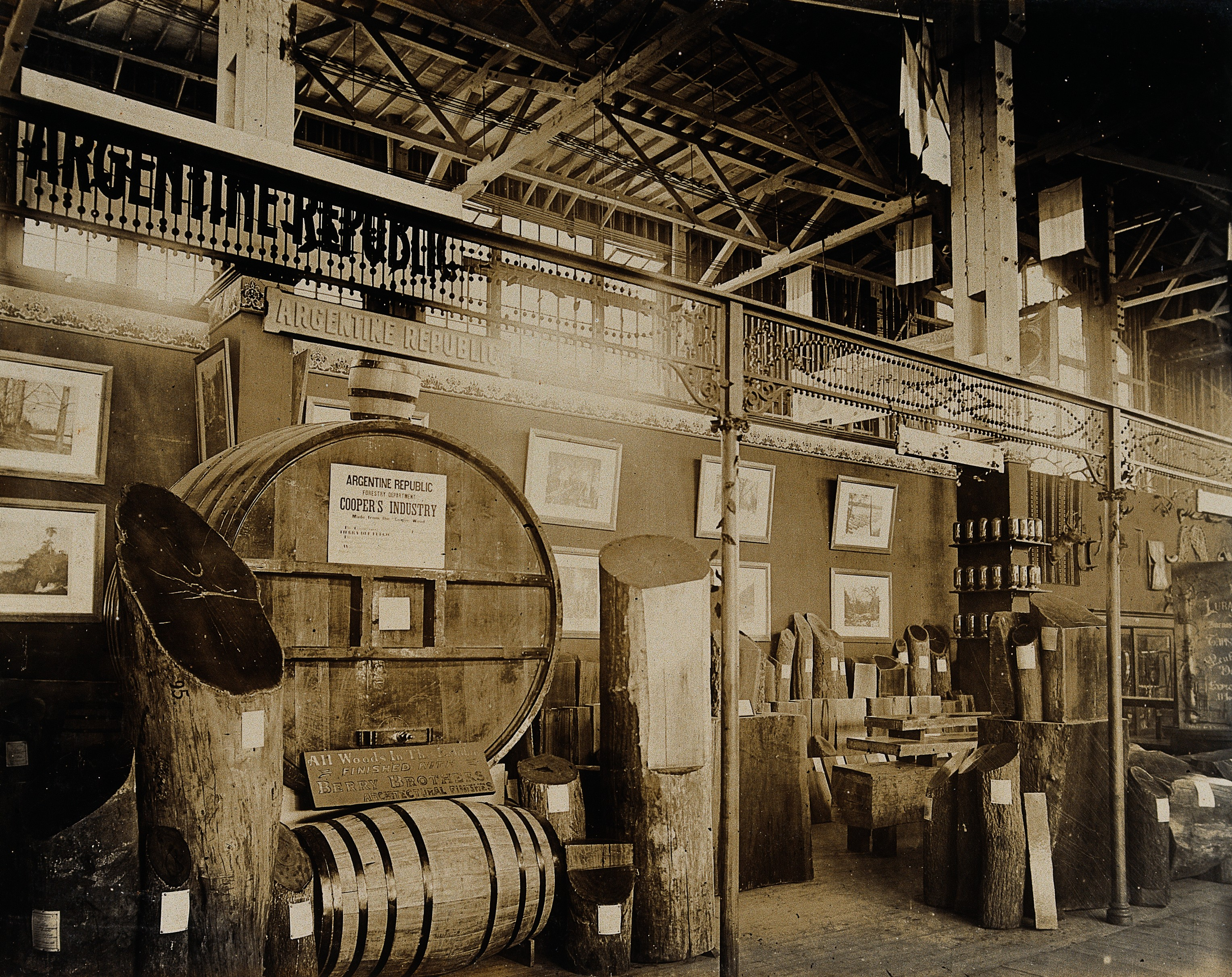
There is a longstanding forestry industry in Argentina, as illustrated by this display at the 1904 World's Fair in St. Louis; however major exports did not begin until 1999.

The forestry sector in Argentina has great potential. The geography of the country extends from north to south, encompassing 4,000 kilometres (2,500 mi). Its variety of climates, land quality, and reliable precipitation allow for the cultivation of different tree species at high growth rates. The climate varies and most areas are quite temperate. The country also enjoys short harvest periods for the most important species. This has allowed the industry to become more competitive and continue its high growth rates.

== Forest situation ==
An estimated 1.115 million hectares were planted as of 2005. There were also 33.2 million hectares (82 million acres) of native forest reserve. Out of this total, 20 million hectares (50 million acres) are high quality land for future development in Argentina. However, this vast amount is not easy to put into production due to its land tenure situation (the proliferation of owners holding areas of 5 to 10 hectares), legislation which protects native forests, and lack of infrastructure. If investors wish to expand their land for cultivation, the opportunity costs are substantial.

The current plantation rate is estimated to be 50,000 hectares per year. It is also estimated that the consumption of wood products from cultivated forests is 5.3 million cubic meters, and sustainable wood supply to the year 2015 will be more than 20 million cubic meters. Argentina, however, is not a major consumer of wood products. For instance, wood is not commonly used in building construction. About 60 to 70 percent of wood product production is used for internal consumption (wood boards, plywood, cellulose pulp, etc.) and the rest for exports.

The growth of planted forests has increased dramatically since 1997 due to new investments (especially from Chile). The implementation of Law 25,008 in January 1999 was an important factor for growth in this sector. This law promoted and assisted the forestry sector for a period of 10 years. Between 1990 and 2000, foreign and domestic investments surpassed US$1.5 billion. The forestry industry depends on both cultivated forests (85 percent) and native forests (15 percent). The major species cultivated in Argentina are pines and eucalyptus. In addition, species such as salix and populus are also cultivated in a smaller scale. Currently, there are no other species that have been introduced for cultivation in Argentina.

Argentina had a 2018 Forest Landscape Integrity Index mean score of 7.21/10, ranking it 47th globally out of 172 countries.

== Production and trade ==
Argentina's exports of forestry products began in earnest in the 1990s. However, as a producer of primary goods with low value added, the country experienced an overall trade deficit that ran from US$500 million to US$1 billion from 1992 to 2002. With the sharp devaluation of the peso in 2002, exports of Argentine forest product were given a shot in the arm. Argentine goods became more attractive and exports began to increase, especially for high-value-added products. Between 2002 and 2004, exports increased from US$300 million to about US$700 million.

=== Wood and furniture ===
During 2005, the success of the forestry industry in Argentina continued. Compared to the years 2000 and 2001, the trade surplus for wood and furniture products increased dramatically. The year 2005 was the fourth consecutive year that this sector experienced a trade surplus.

It is estimated that for one hectare of cultivated forest, the industry produces 400 tons of wood. Moreover, the average value of a cubic meter of wood boards from cultivated forests is US$70 to US$80. In some cases, there are boards that run between US$200 to US$250 and there is a small niche of specific types of boards with prices up to US$400. The area between Misiones, Corrientes, and Entre Ríos is the major producer of wood products, and represents 65 percent of the total production in Argentina.

In terms of the major destinations of Argentina's exports of wood and furniture products, the United States, Brazil, Spain, and Chile continue to be the most important markets. In 2005, both South Africa and the Dominican Republic emerged as markets for this sector. China in 2005 also increased its demand for forestry products from Argentina, but they are mainly low-value-added products. Some of the most important exports goods from Argentina are fiber and particleboards, plywood, wood boxes and containers, and wood handles for tools.

Imports of wood and furniture in 2005 experienced an increase of 52 percent compared to the previous year. This increase was mainly for products such as staves and barrels for the wine industry, boxes, and other products for packing. These imports in particular experienced a US$25 million increase compared to 2004, which represents 25 percent of the total imported goods in 2005. There are also other products such as cork products as well as paper and cardboard products in which imports have increased.

=== Cellulose pulp ===
Argentina is the third biggest producer of cellulose pulp in Latin America. As of 2005, Argentina produced 1.5 million tons. The major plants are located in Misiones and they use pinewood as their raw material. The most important plants in this region are Alto Paraná S.A. and Papel Misionero S.A. There are also other plants that use fiber from eucalyptus as raw material for both the production of cellulose fiber and paper.

==== Pulp mill dispute ====
There are also other issues that can make some aspects of the industry uncertain. Currently there is a dispute between Uruguay and Argentina over two cellulose plants that are being built on the Uruguayan side of the Río de la Plata, which forms the border between the two countries. This dispute began after Argentine environmentalists alleged that the plants would pollute the river that divides the two countries, and asserted that Uruguay had not provided the necessary information on the environmental impact of the plants. In protest, Argentine environmentalists blocked traffic on the Libertador General San Martín Bridge and General Artigas Bridge, the two main international bridges connecting the two countries. As of now, the Argentine and Uruguay government have not been able to resolve the issue. This impasse could possibly slow down the development and introduction of new technologies for the forestry sector. Such technologies are crucial to increase cultivated land and production. Argentina has the potential to become a major cluster for the worldwide cellulose pulp industry, but more investment is necessary.

=== Paper production ===
Argentina is the fourth largest producer of paper, paperboard and corrugated fiberboard in Latin America. As of the 2004, the sector produced about 1.4 million tons. The production experienced an increase of 11 percent compared to 2003. However, this production only satisfied 67 percent of domestic demand. The paper production in Argentina is primarily for packing (48 percent), printing (25 percent), and newspapers (13 percent).

The forestry sector in Argentina experienced significant growth rates between 2001 and 2006. An estimated 1.115 million hectares (2.8 million acres) were planted as of 2005. It is estimated that this year, between 40,000 and 50,000 hectares (100,000 to 124,000 acres) will be cultivated mainly in the Mesopotamia region (the provinces of Misiones, Corrientes, and Entre Ríos). Among the most important species cultivated in the country are pines and eucalyptus, representing 50 and 30 percent of production, respectively.

Major factors that have contributed to the industry's growth have been the land quality, the relative lower price of the land compared to other markets such as Brazil and Chile, and Law 25,080, which has been in effect since 1999. This law, besides providing economic incentives for small and medium producers, has also created important fiscal benefits to attract both domestic and foreign investments. The outlook for the forestry sector is positive in the short term. The relative short average periods for harvest and Brazil's current young cultivation should help Argentina become more competitive in the wood market. However, there are still challenges that the industry needs to overcome to exploit its potential, such as the development of infrastructure in various forestry areas.

== Government policy ==
Argentina currently does not have restrictions limiting the cultivation of forests in private properties. Only native forests are regulated by the government contingent upon the approval of the cultivation project by local government.

=== Law Number 13,272 ===
This law is intended to conserve the forests, prohibit deforestation, and the irrational use of forestry products. It also specifies that any investment project carried out in natural forests needs to be approved by the Argentine government.

=== Law Number 24,856 ===
This law oversees activities such as implementation of projects, restoration, maintenance, protection, and sustainable management of native forests. It also establishes rules for the commercialization of forestry products and non-forestry products from native forests.

=== Law Number 25,089 ===
This law was implemented in January 1999 and is intended to increase land development by the Argentine forestry industry to 3 million hectares of cultivated forest in 10 years. It also establishes an inventory process for planted forests and has provided for the establishment of agreements with international organizations that focus on development and technology transfer for this industry. This law also provides tax benefits and economic support for Argentine and foreign investors.

- Tax benefits:
  - Tax stability for 30 to 50 years for companies with forestry investment projects
  - Accelerated amortization of income taxes
  - Accelerated return of value-added tax (21 percent)
  - Tax breaks on assets, real estate, sales, and gross income from state and municipal governments
  - Accelerated depreciation of capital goods
- Economic Support
  - The Argentine government will finance up to 100 percent for projects with 700 hectares, 50 percent for forests between 701 and 1,000 hectares, 30 percent for extensions between 1,001 and 2,000 hectare, and 15 percent for more than 2,001 hectares Support for projects focused in plantation of traditional species and enrichment of native forests

== Forestry by region ==
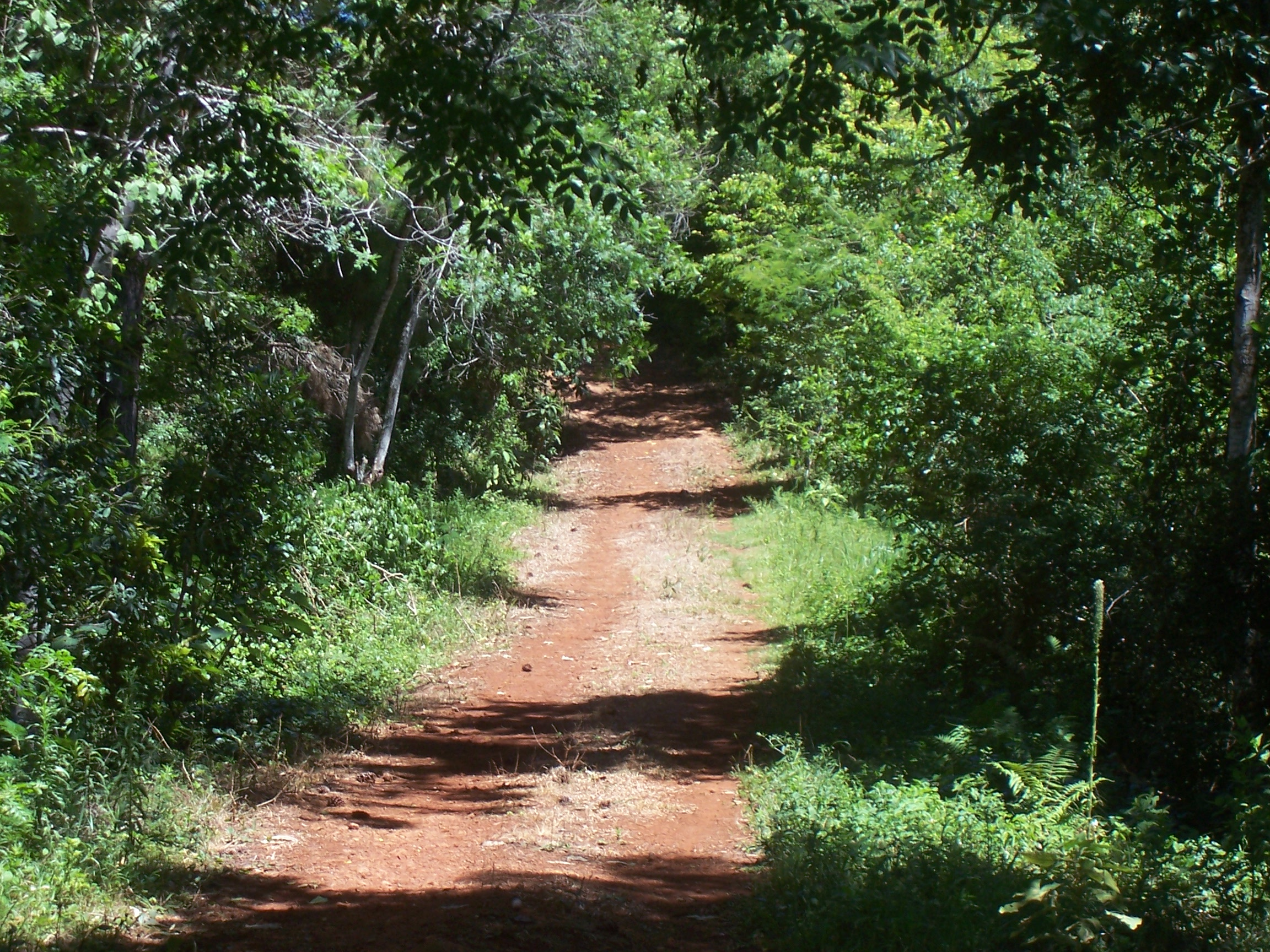
A path in a jungle in Misiones with its characteristic red soil

Among the most important regions in Argentina for the industry are the provinces of Misiones, Corrientes, Entre Ríos, and Buenos Aires. These four provinces form the country's eastern border with Uruguay and Brazil, and comprise 80% of the total cultivated area.

Forests are composed of the following species:

- 50% – Pine (Misiones, Corrientes, Entre Ríos, Patagonia, Central and Northwest areas of the country)
- 30% – Eucalyptus (Misiones, Corrientes, Entre Ríos, Buenos Aires, La Pampa, Santa Fe, Central and Northwest area of the country)
- 16% – Willow and aspen (Buenos Aires, Río Negro, Mendoza, Neuquén)
- 4% – Other broad-leaved trees

The Argentine forestry sector has strengthened considerably in the last 15 years. The reasons behind this growth include:

- Great extensions of undeveloped land for the forestry industry at low prices that do not compete with other industries such as agriculture
- The Law 25,080 which provides economic incentives and favorable investment environment for the industry (including fiscal stability)
- No restrictions for foreign investment

During the 1990s, Argentina was a net importer of forestry products with high value-added (i.e. paper, cardboard, furniture, etc.) and a net exporter of primary and low value added goods (i.e. wood, cellulose pulp). This situation has changed especially after the currency devaluation in 2002 and foreign investment during the 1990s. Now, the country has begun producing a number of high value added products such as fiberboards and finished products such as furniture. Argentina is now in a position to become an important producer of forest products in the future. The industry is focusing on the production of more high value added products, and increasing rates of plantation.

== Tree cover extent and loss ==
Global Forest Watch publishes annual estimates of tree cover loss and 2000 tree cover extent derived from time-series analysis of Landsat satellite imagery in the Global Forest Change dataset. In this framework, tree cover refers to vegetation taller than 5 m (including natural forests and tree plantations), and tree cover loss is defined as the complete removal of tree cover canopy for a given year, regardless of cause.

For Argentina, country statistics report cumulative tree cover loss of 6,968,747 ha (69,687.47 km^{2}) from 2001 to 2024 (about 17.8% of its 2000 tree cover area). For tree cover density greater than 30%, country statistics report a 2000 tree cover extent of 39,069,969 ha (390,699.69 km^{2}). The charts and table below display this data. In simple terms, the annual loss number is the area where tree cover disappeared in that year, and the extent number shows what remains of the 2000 tree cover baseline after subtracting cumulative loss. Forest regrowth is not included in the dataset.

Annual tree cover loss in Argentina, 2001–2024. View chart definition.
Tree cover extent in 2000 minus cumulative tree cover loss in Argentina, 2001–2024 (loss-only residual; does not account for gain). View chart definition.

Annual tree cover extent and loss
| Year | Tree cover extent (km2) (Note: This residual measure does not include forest regrowth.) | Annual tree cover loss (km2) |
|---|---|---|
| 2001 | 389,221.68 | 1,478.01 |
| 2002 | 388,172.34 | 1,049.34 |
| 2003 | 385,681.27 | 2,491.07 |
| 2004 | 381,347.04 | 4,334.23 |
| 2005 | 377,674.57 | 3,672.47 |
| 2006 | 374,510.44 | 3,164.13 |
| 2007 | 370,257.09 | 4,253.35 |
| 2008 | 364,329.90 | 5,927.19 |
| 2009 | 361,231.36 | 3,098.54 |
| 2010 | 357,098.91 | 4,132.45 |
| 2011 | 352,106.97 | 4,991.94 |
| 2012 | 347,325.17 | 4,781.80 |
| 2013 | 343,557.71 | 3,767.46 |
| 2014 | 341,146.52 | 2,411.19 |
| 2015 | 339,344.25 | 1,802.27 |
| 2016 | 337,041.13 | 2,303.12 |
| 2017 | 334,701.68 | 2,339.45 |
| 2018 | 332,972.03 | 1,729.65 |
| 2019 | 331,517.45 | 1,454.58 |
| 2020 | 329,543.40 | 1,974.05 |
| 2021 | 327,524.43 | 2,018.97 |
| 2022 | 325,202.18 | 2,322.25 |
| 2023 | 323,042.78 | 2,159.40 |
| 2024 | 321,012.22 | 2,030.56 |

== REDD+ forest reference emission level and monitoring ==
Argentina has submitted a subnational forest reference emission level (FREL) under the UNFCCC REDD+ framework, which was assessed through a UNFCCC technical assessment in 2019. On the UNFCCC REDD+ Web Platform, Argentina is listed as having reported a national strategy, a safeguards information summary and a national forest monitoring system, and as having an assessed reference level.

In its 2019 submission (as modified during the technical assessment), Argentina constructed a FREL covering the REDD+ activity “reducing emissions from deforestation” for four forest regions (Parque Chaqueño, Selva Misionera, Selva Tucumano Boliviana (Yungas) and parts of Espinal) as an interim step toward a future national FREL. The assessed benchmark is an average of historical gross emissions for the 2002–2013 reference period and corresponds to 101,141,848 t CO2 eq per year, without an adjustment for national circumstances. Argentina’s results reported for 2014–2018 on the REDD+ Web Platform are associated with the same assessed reference level and relate to reducing emissions from deforestation in these four regions.

The technical assessment reports that activity data were derived from Argentina’s National Native Forest Monitoring System and associated deforestation mapping, distinguishing “forest land” (TF) and “other forest land” (OTF) classes within native forests, and that emission factors for above- and below-ground biomass were largely based on the First National Native Forest Inventory (PINBN). The FREL included CO2 only and excluded deadwood, litter and soil organic carbon (in mineral and organic soils), with the assessment team identifying the treatment of these pools and non-CO2 gases (e.g., from burning) as areas for stepwise improvement; the overall uncertainty of the FREL estimate was reported as about 2%.

== Other issues ==
There are both negative and positive factors that currently affect the forestry industry in Argentina that need to be considered by investors. Argentina still has low land prices relative to other countries involved in forestry (e.g., Chile and Brazil). It is estimated that the cost of land varies between US$250 and US$450 per hectare (US$101 and US$182/acre). Also, Misiones and Corrientes have estimated cultivation costs of US$800 to US$1,000 and US$400 to US$500 per hectare respectively. The soil, especially in the area of Misiones and Corrientes, is specially suited for forestry, and has one of the highest growth rates for forestry in the world.

Another issue is the lack of interest of the SAGPyA (Secretaria de Agricultura, Ganaderia, Pesca y Alimentacion) to promote the forestry industry. Even though there is a law implemented for the promotion of the forestry sector, it is not a priority for the government. In many cases, economic support for cultivation projects has been delayed. For instance, it is not clear if Law 25,008 will be extended in the year 2009 or if it will be modified. In 2006, the Argentine Forestry Association-Mesopotamia (Afome) complained to the Ministry of Economy about how SAGPyA has managed the Law 25,008. Afome blames SAGPyA for not reaching cultivation goals established in 1999 due to delayed promotional payments.

== See also ==
- Agriculture in Argentina
