= 2004 Carmen de Patagones school shooting =

Mass shooting in Buenos Aires Province, Argentina

- Carmen de Patagones (Argentina)
- Location: 40°48′9″S 62°59′0″W; Carmen de Patagones, Buenos Aires Province, Argentina
- Date: 28 September 2004; 7:35 a.m. (GMT-3)
- Target: Students and Classmates in room 1º B at the "Islas Malvinas" Institute
- Attack type: School shooting, mass shooting, mass murder
- Weapons: Browning HP (9mm); Hunting knife (Unused)
- Deaths: 3
- Injuries: 5
- Perpetrator: Rafael Solich
- Motive: Inconclusive, possibly: Schizophrenic delusions; Columbine High School massacre copycat crime; Retaliation for bullying
- Sentence: Solich: None – age of criminal responsibility not met Solich's father: 45 days' imprisonment

28 September 2004, a mass shooting occurred at the "Islas Malvinas" Institute in Carmen de Patagones, Buenos Aires Province, Argentina, when 15-year-old Rafael Solich killed three fellow students and wounded five others. Solich was not prosecuted for the crime, as he was under the age of criminal responsibility at the time.

== Background ==
Rafael "Juniors" Solich (born 27 October 1988), is the son of Rafael Solich and Esther Pangue. His father nicknamed him after the Buenos Aires football club Boca Juniors. His father was involved in the Argentine Naval Prefecture, and Solich took his gun to commit the shootings. He claimed to have been planning "something" since the seventh grade.

Solich had one friend, Dante, and the pair communicated in English to keep private. Classmates said that the pair listened to Marilyn Manson and wore black, and would draw Satanic imagery such as inverted crosses. The pair had recently gone to the cinema to watch Elephant, a film about a school shooting directly based on the Columbine High School massacre. The night before the shooting, Solich listened to the song "The Nobodies" by Marilyn Manson, which addresses the perpetrators of the Columbine massacre.

== Events ==
The morning of Tuesday 28 September 2004, in the middle school N°202 "Islas Malvinas" in Carmen de Patagones, Solich opened fire on his classmates in their classroom. The massacre took place at 7:35, the time at which classes started. Solich entered the institute in which around 400 students attended class, bringing a Browning Hi-Power 9mm pistol (which belonged to his father, subofficial of the Argentine Naval Prefecture), two full magazines and a hunting knife hidden in a military coat.

In the classroom 1° B, Solich stood up in front of the class, took the gun and discharged the entire magazine upon his classmates without saying a word. After emptying the magazine, he headed for the hall, loaded a second magazine and shot again, this time at the person in charge of the school buffet, whom he did not manage to injure.

He kept walking through the main hall until Dante Pena, one of his classmates and best friends, tackled him and removed his weapon. After the authorities were warned, he did not resist, was arrested and transferred to the port city of Bahía Blanca.

Because of the attack, three of his classmates died, aged between 15 and 16, and five other students were injured. The then-president Néstor Kirchner described the episode as "painful" and declared two national days of mourning.

In all the schools in the country, an event of reflection was held, where a letter sent by the Ministry of Education was read for everyone.

== Victims ==
Three students were killed, and five others were injured during the attack in the classroom.

The victims were:

Fatalities

- Federico Ponce, 15
- Evangelina Miranda, 16
- Sandra Núñez, 16

Injured

- Natalia Salomón
- Nicolás Leonardi
- Cintia Casasola
- Rodrigo Torres
- Pablo Saldías Kloster

== Legal proceedings ==
Solich told a judge, "I remember some of it...no, I don't know. Actually, it went really quickly". He did not sleep the night before the attack, confessing that he was nervous. He did not show anyone his gun, but displayed his knife to Dante. Although he would not answer when asked for his motive, he revealed that he had been angry with his peers since kindergarten and had been planning an attack since the seventh grade: "They say that I am strange...they fuck with me because I have this spot on my nose".

Solich was not criminally prosecuted due to his age being 15, which falls under the Argentine age of criminal responsibility of 16. His father was jailed for 45 days and made to relinquish his firearm.

== Aftermath ==
While in medical custody, he was diagnosed with schizophrenia and treated for a personality disorder. He was kept in psychiatric care until 2007, when he was given liberty from the hospital in La Plata for a weekly ration of hours: first 24, then 48, then 96. As of September 2014, he did not work or study. A female survivor of the attack saw him in the streets of the city, and subsequently suffered panic attacks and required therapy. Before his location was discovered, Argentine media speculated on it. As of 2022, he has one son.

Solich's family were evacuated from Carmen de Patagones immediately after the attack. Dante was deemed by the community to have had prior knowledge of the attack, and was ostracised, with parents threatening to not send their children back to school if he were there; eventually, he and his family were also moved out of town.

The families of the victims sued the Naval Prefecture and the province's Schools Department for 12 million Argentine pesos.

After the July 2006 mass shooting on Cabildo Avenue in Belgrano, Buenos Aires, where 18-year-old Alfredo Marcenac was killed and six others were injured by serial shooter Martín Ríos, Marcenac's parents and friends joined the survivors of Carmen de Patagones in their program of the Red Argentina para el Desarme (Spanish: Argentine Network for Disarmament), pursuing campaigns for gun control and less ownership by common citizens.
