= Penal Code of Argentina =

The Argentine Penal Code is the law that governs crimes and its sanction in the Argentine Republic.

== Background ==
Hispanic period Before and after 1810, until the initiation of the codification of criminal law with the Tejedor Project, the exclusive source of the repressive legislation in force in the territory of the Río de la Plata, which for the most part became the United Provinces and then that of the Argentine Republic, were the Spanish penal laws prior to the Penal Code of 1822. The new Compilation, the Laws of the Indies, The Parties, the Jurisdiction, the Laws of Bull and the Newly Compiled1, which constitute that source, reflected the reception of Roman and canon law.

May revolution As of 1810, together with the Spanish laws that subsisted as common repressive legislation, special laws governed, mostly with local validity in the different provinces. The most important law of national scope was nº 49 (14-09-1863) that designated the crimes whose judgment competed with the national courts and established its penalty. This law, recognizing the power of the provinces to dictate their own penal codes, declared them to be supplementary in respect of crimes against the Nation not foreseen in it and common crimes committed in the places subject to their jurisdiction (Article 93). He thus acknowledged, in an express way, the double source of common criminal law existing at that time in the country.

The Project of Carlos Tejedor First attempt of general criminal codification, was written by commission of the National Executive Power (05-12-1864), by Carlos Tejedor, professor of the University of Buenos Aires. In the general provisions of its General Part, the Project follows, to a great extent, the Bavarian Penal Code of 1813, the work of Paul Johann Anselm Von Feuerbach. To a lesser extent he received the contribution of the Spanish doctrine through Joaquín Francisco Pacheco, commentator of the Spanish Code of 1848/50 and of the French doctrine through Chauveau. In Part Two, the Peruvian code of 1862 and the aforementioned Spanish predominate as immediate sources. The Tejedor Project was not sanctioned as a national code, but by virtue of the authorization granted by art. 108 of the National Constitution, was adopted as a criminal code by eleven provinces, with some modifications made in Buenos Aires. It represents, through the 1886 code, an important precedent of many provisions of the current code.

The project of 1881 In the Project of 1881 (03-01-1880), written by Sixto Villegas, Andrés Ugarriza and Juan A. García, in charge of examining the Tejedor Project by the National Executive Power, the influence of the Spanish Code of 1870 predominates. Córdoba adopted it as a penal code, with some modifications (14-08-1882). Presented this project to the Chamber of Deputies (11-05-1881) was not accepted.

== The Code of 1886 ==
The first Penal Code for the Nation (Law 1920 - 07-12-1886) was sanctioned by Congress on the basis of the Tejedor project and came into force on February 1, 1887. It does not include criminal legislation in its entirety, but rather that leaves to the margin, contained in the Law nº 49, the federal legislation on crimes and crimes against the Nation.

The reform of 1890 On June 7, 1890, the National Executive Power commissioned Norberto Piñero, Rodolfo Rivarola and José Nicolás Matienzo to plan the reform of the Code. The Project, presented in June 1891, legislated on national crimes and misdemeanors, unified the common criminal legislation. In addition to reviewing the list of crimes of the 1886 Code, it filled its gaps regarding the application of criminal law in space. He kept the sources of Spanish origin. This Project presented the preponderant contribution of the Italian codes of 1889, Hungarian of 1878, Dutch of 1881 and Belgian of 1867, which contained the latest and best criminal legislation. Your text is a valuable precedent for interpreting the original text of the current code. The 1891 Project, which only obtained a favorable opinion from the Committee of Deputies, served as the basis for the reforms introduced in the 1886 Code by Law 4,189 (09/21/1903). Opinion, especially from the positivists, was averse to the reform.

1906 reform project Faced with the situation described above, the Executive Power ordered the revision of the 1886 Code by a commission formed, in addition to Piñero and Rivarola, drafters of the 1891 Project, by F. Beagley, D. Saavedra, Moyano Gacitúa and Ramos Mejía (09 -12-1904). The Project that is denominated of 1906, and was presented to the National Executive Power, on March 10 of that year and sent to the Congress on September 1, follows the orientation of 1891. The Deputy Rodolfo Moreno (h) was the one who gave the last impulse to the long reform process of the 1886 Code. With some modifications. He presented the reform project of 1906, on which a commission of deputies, headed by Moreno, drafted the 1917 Project. It only legislated on crimes. It was criticized by the positivist sector, "because it makes a clean slate of the crimes of the advances produced in criminal law during the twentieth century.

== The code of 1921 ==
The 1917 Project, which was subject to reforms in the Senate that did not alter its structure, was sanctioned as a Criminal Code on September 30, 1921. It was promulgated as Law 11,179 on October 29 of the same year and entered into force as of April 30, 1922. This Code, born in full swing of the Positive School in the country, in its first quarter of the century was the subject of more critical consideration than a positive interpretation. Incorporated into positive law institutions such as: probation and conditional condemnation, the measures applicable to those charged, minors and recidivists, as well as the extenuating and aggravating of the penalty.

Reform projects after 1921 There have been numerous projects of reforms to the Code among others, the partial ones on the dangerous state of 1924, 1926, 1928 and 1932 and that of the senate of 1933 and those of total reform of Coll and Gómez (1936), of positivist orientation; de Peco (1941), neo - positivist and with an important Statement of Motives; 1951, authoritarian and positivist; and that of 1960, written by Soler and reviewed by an advisory commission. After the Project of 1960, came the one of 1963, drafted by a commission appointed by the Executive Power; the 1973 draft, prepared by the commission designated by ministerial resolution of 19-12-2000, adopted by a subcommission, which in general departs less from the Criminal Code than the two previous ones. Finally there are the Soler Project of 1979 (Soler - Aguirre Cabral and Rizzi) and the one that in 1994 propitiated the Executive Power, on the basis of the innovations suggested by Professor Eugenio Raúl Zaffaroni in his preliminary draft of reforms submitted to the Ministry of Justice of the Nation on August 15, 1991. As of that year, the Penal Code, although it has resisted the multiple attempts of general reform, has suffered them to a great extent, through laws, decree-laws and the so-called laws. Law 17,567 (of January 12, 1968) reformed the Penal Code, inspired by the Soler Project. Law 21,338 (of June 25, 1976) restored all the reforms that Law 17,567 made to the Penal Code in 1967. Finally, the National Congress, through Law 23,077, of August 27, 1984, restored most of the text of Law 11,179 of 1921.

== Systematization ==
The Criminal Code consists of two books:

Book one, general provisions, describing the legal principles that apply, consists of 13 titles that deal with:

TITLE I

Application of criminal law Arts.1 to 4

TITLE II

Penalties Arts. 5 to 25

TITLE III

Conditional sentencing Arts. 26 to 29

TITLE IV

Restitution and damages Arts. 30 to 33

TITLE V

Imputability (acts which are not punishable, e.g. due to self-defence, mental aberrations)Arts. 34 to 41

TITLE VI

Crimes attempted but not committed 42 to 44

TITLE VII

Criminal conspiracy Arts. 45 to 49

TITLE VIII

Recidivism Arts. 50 to 53

TITLE IX

Multiple crimes Arts. 54 to 58

TITLE X

Extinction of actions and penalties Arts. 59 to 70

TITLE XI

Of the exercise of the actions Arts. 71 to 76

TITLE XII

Suspended sentence Arts. 76 bis to 76

TITLE XIII

Meaning of the concepts used in the code. Arts. 77 to 78 bis

Book two, of crimes describes different types of crime and their severity, consists of 13 titles and a section of complementary provisions that deal with:

TITLE I

Crimes against people Arts. 79 to 108

TITLE II

Crimes against honor (defamation) Arts. 109 a 117 bis

TITLE III

Crimes against sexual integrity Arts. 118 to 133

TITLE IV

Crimes against civil status Arts. 134 a 139 bis

TITLE V
Crimes against freedom Arts. 140 to 161
TITLE VI

Crimes against property Arts. 162 to 185

TITLE VII

Crimes against public safety Arts. 186 to 208

TITLE VIII

Crimes against public order Arts. 209 to 213 bis

TITLE IX

Crimes against the security of the Nation Arts. 214 to 225

TITLE X

Crimes against the public powers and the constitutional order Arts. 226 to 236

TITLE XI

Crimes against public administration Arts. 237 a 281 bis

TITLE XII

Crimes against public trust (counterfeiting, etc.) Arts. 282 to 302

TITLE XIII

Crimes against the economic and financial order Arts. 303 to 313

COMPLEMENTARY PROVISIONS

Arts. 303 to 305
