= National university =

University created or managed by a government

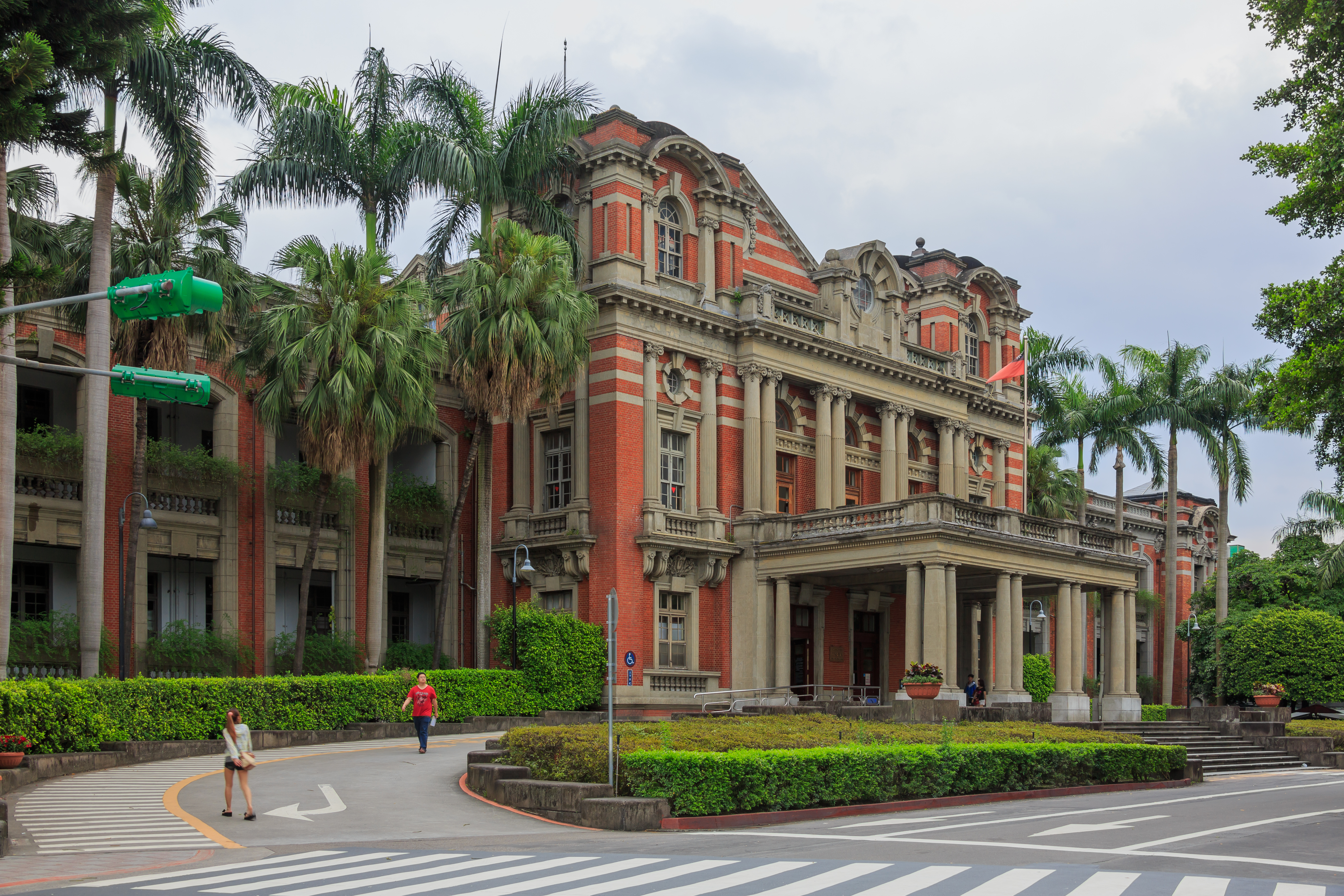
National Taiwan University, a national university in Taiwan

A national university is mainly a university created or managed by a government, but which may also at the same time operate autonomously without direct control by the state. In the United States, the term "national university" connotes the highest institutional level in education, differing in meaning from a "federally-chartered university." Globally, some national universities are associated with national cultural or political aspirations. For example, the National University of Ireland during the early days of Irish independence collected a large amount of information about the Irish language and Irish culture. In Argentina, the national universities are the result of the 1918 Argentine university reform and subsequent reforms, which were intended to provide a secular university system without direct clerical or government influence by bestowing self-government on the institutions.

== List of national universities ==
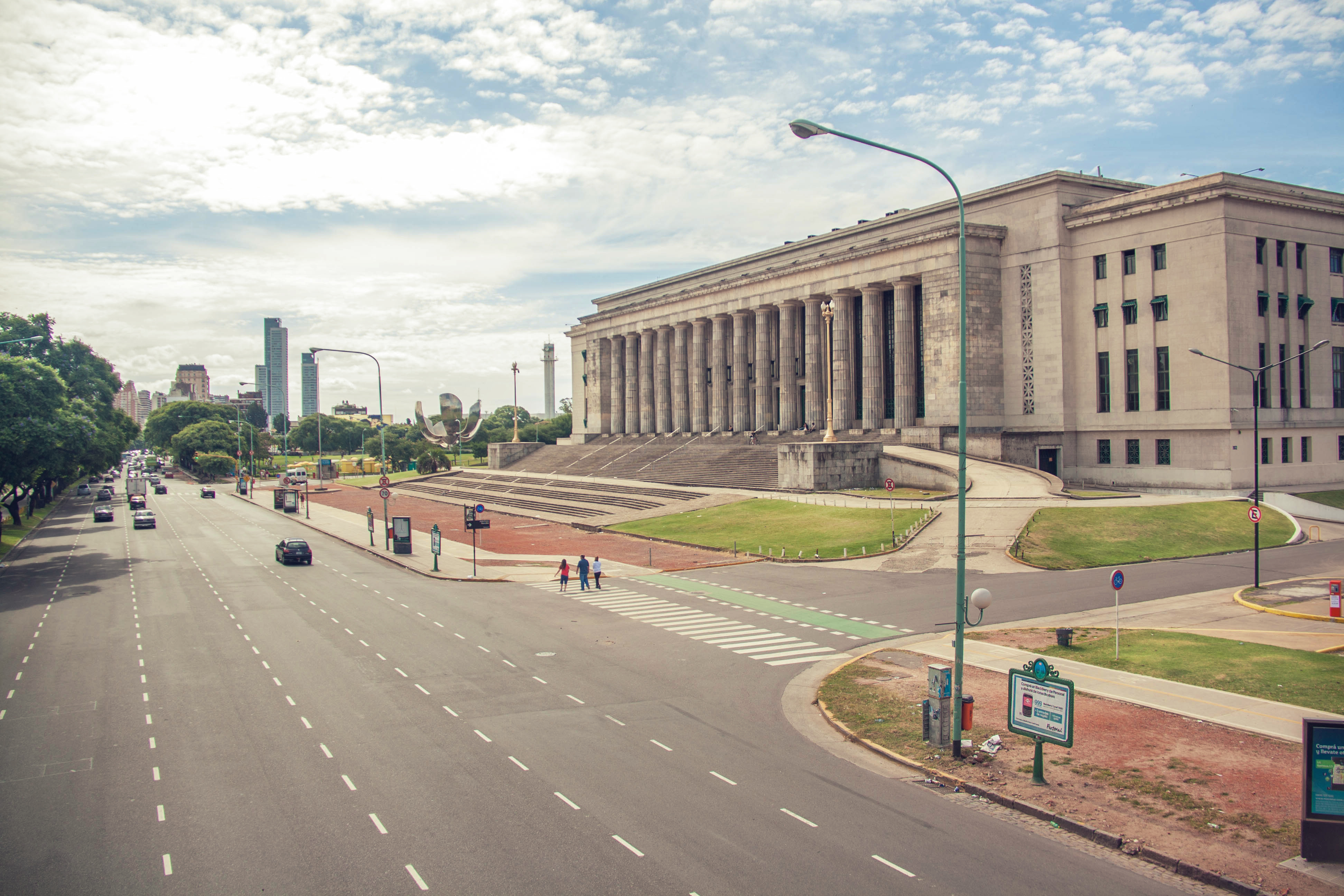
Faculty of Law of the University of Buenos Aires, Argentina

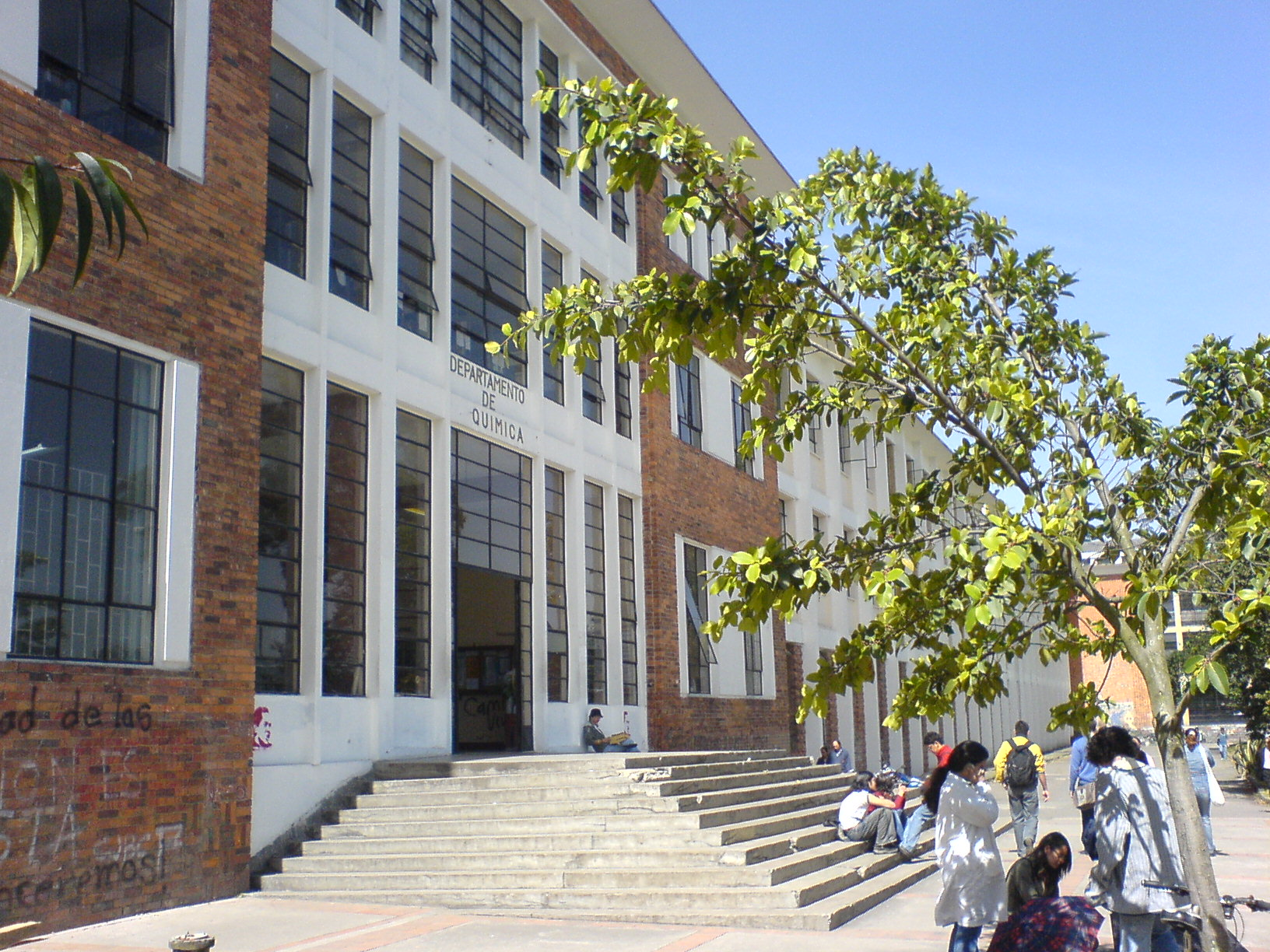
National University of Colombia, Chemistry department

=== Argentina ===
- National Technological University
- National University of Córdoba
- National University of the Arts
- National University Arturo Jauretche
- National University Guillermo Brown
- National University of Austral Patagonia
- National University of Avellaneda
- National University of Catamarca
- National University of Central Buenos Aires
- National University of Chilecito
- National University of Comahue
- National University of Cuyo
- National University of Delta
- National University of Entre Ríos
- National University of Formosa
- National University of General San Martín
- National University of General Sarmiento
- National University of Hurlingham
- National University of José C. Paz
- National University of Jujuy
- National University of La Matanza
- National University of La Pampa
- National University of La Plata
- National University of La Rioja
- National University of Lanús
- National University of Lomas de Zamora
- National University of Luján
- National University of Mar del Plata
- National University of Misiones
- National University of Moreno
- National University of Northwestern Buenos Aires
- National University of Patagonia San Juan Bosco
- National University of Pilar (Argentina)
- National University of Quilmes
- National University of Rafaela
- National University of Río Cuarto
- National University of Río Negro
- National University of Río Tercero
- National University of Rosario
- National University of Salta
- National University of San Antonio de Areco
- National University of San Juan
- National University of San Luis
- National University of Santiago del Estero
- National University of the Chaco Austral
- National University of the Comechingones
- National University of the Littoral
- National University of the Northeast
- National University of the South
- National University of the West
- National University of Tierra del Fuego
- National University of Tres de Febrero
- National University of Tucumán
- National University of Villa María
- National University of Villa Mercedes
- National University Raúl Scalabrini Ortiz
- National Pedagogical University
- University of Buenos Aires
- University of National Defense

=== Australia ===
- Australian National University

=== Bangladesh ===
- National University of Bangladesh

=== Bhutan ===
- Royal University of Bhutan

=== Bosnia and Herzegovina ===
- University of Sarajevo

=== Brazil ===
- University of Brasilia

=== Brunei ===
- Universiti Brunei Darussalam

=== Cambodia ===
- Institute of Foreign Languages
- Institute of Technology of Cambodia
- National University of Management
- Royal University of Agriculture
- Royal University of Fine Arts
- Royal University of Law and Economics
- Royal University of Phnom Penh
- University of Health Sciences

=== Canada ===
- Royal Military College of Canada

=== Chile ===
- University of Chile

=== China ===
==== 39 Universities in Project 985/Project 211/Double First Class ====
- Fudan University
- Harbin Institute of Technology
- Nanjing University
- Xi'an Jiao Tong University
- Beihang University
- Beijing Institute of Technology
- Beijing Normal University
- Central South University
- Central University for Nationalities (Minzu University of China)
- Chongqing University
- Dalian University of Technology
- East China Normal University
- Huazhong University of Science and Technology
- Hunan University
- Jilin University
- Ocean University of China
- Tianjin University
- Tongji University
- University of Electronic Science and Technology of China
- Wuhan University
- Xiamen University
- Shandong University
- Sichuan University
- South China University of Technology
- Southeast University
- Sun Yat-sen University
- Peking University
- Shanghai Jiao Tong University
- Tsinghua University
- University of Science and Technology of China
- Zhejiang University
- China Agricultural University
- Lanzhou University
- Nankai University
- National University of Defense Technology
- Northeastern University
- Northwest A&F University
- Northwestern Polytechnical University
- Renmin University of China

=== Colombia ===
- National University of Colombia
- University of Antioquia
- University of Valle
- University of Atlántico
- Industrial University of Santander
- University of Cartagena
- University of Cauca
- University of Pamplona
- University of Caldas
- University of Quindío
- University of Tolima
- South Colombian University
- University of Nariño
- Pedagogical and Technological University of Colombia
- University of Cundinamarca
- University of the Llanos
- University of the Amazon
- University of Magdalena
- University of Córdoba (Colombia)
- University of Sucre
- Popular University of Cesar
- University of La Guajira
- Technological University of Chocó

=== Costa Rica ===
- Costa Rica Institute of Technology (TEC)
- Distance State University (UNED)
- National Technical University (UTN)
- National University of Costa Rica (UNA)
- University of Costa Rica (UCR)

=== Ecuador ===
- Amazonic State University
- Armed Forces University – ESPE
- Agrarian Polytechnic College "Manuel Félix López" (ESPAM)
- Agrarian University of Ecuador (UAG)
- Bolívar State University (UEB)
- Central University of Ecuador)
- Escuela Superior Politécnica del Litoral
- Milagro State University (UNEMI)
- National Polytechnic School (Ecuador)
- National University of Chimborazo (UNACH)
- National University of Education (Ecuador)
- National University of Loja (UNL)
- Northern Technical University (UTN)
- Polytechnical State University of Carchi (UPEC)
- Polytechnical College of Chimborazo (ESPOCH)
- Regional Amazonic University "Ikiam"
- Secular University of Manabí "Eloy Alfaro" (ULEAM)
- Southern Manabí State University (UESM)
- Technical University of Ambato (UTA)
- Technical University of Babahoyo (UTB)
- Technical University of Cotopaxi (UTC)
- Technical University of Machala (UTMACH)
- Technical University of Manabí (UTM)
- University of Arts (Ecuador)
- University of Cuenca
- University of Guayaquil
- Universidad Estatal Península de Santa Elena
- Universidad Técnica Estatal de Quevedo
- Yachay University

=== Egypt ===
- Egyptian e-Learning University
- Galala University
- King Salman International University
- Alamein International University
- New Mansoura University
- Nile University
- Egypt University of Informatics
- Helwan National University

=== Equatorial Guinea ===
- National University of Equatorial Guinea

=== Eswatini (formerly Swaziland) ===
- University of Eswatini

=== Fiji (Formerly Fiji Islands) ===
- Fiji National University

=== Greece ===
- National and Kapodistrian University of Athens
- National Technical University of Athens

=== Guatemala ===
- Universidad de San Carlos de Guatemala

=== Guyana ===
- University of Guyana

=== Iceland ===
- University of Iceland

=== India ===
==== Institutes of National Importance (91 institutes) ====
- All India Institutes of Medical Sciences (7 functioning, 13 upcoming)
- Indian Institutes of Technology (23 functioning)
- National Institutes of Technology (31 functioning)
- Indian Institutes of Information Technology (23 functioning)
- Indian Institutes of Engineering Science and Technology
- Indian Institutes of Science Education and Research (7 functioning, 1 upcoming)
- National Institute of Pharmaceutical Education and Research (7 functioning, 4 upcoming)
- Indian Statistical Institute (Headquartered in Kolkata with 4 branches)
- School of Planning and Architecture (3 functioning)
- Indian Institutes of Management (20 functioning)

Central Universities of India

- Indian Institute of Science
- National Law Universities
- National Institute of Science Education and Research
- Jamia Millia Islamia
- Indira Gandhi National Open University
- Pondicherry University
- Nalanda University
- Aligarh Muslim University
- Jawaharlal Nehru University
- University of Delhi
- Tezpur University
- Assam University
- North-Eastern Hill University
- Mizoram University
- Rajiv Gandhi University
- Tripura University
- Nagaland University
- Manipur University
- Central University of Rajasthan
- Central University of Kashmir
- Central University of Jammu
- Central University of Gujarat
- Central University of Haryana

=== Indonesia ===
- Airlangga University
- Andalas University
- Bandung Institute of Technology
- Brawijaya University
- Diponegoro University
- Education University of Indonesia
- Gadjah Mada University
- Hasanuddin University
- International Islamic University of Indonesia
- IPB University
- Open University of Indonesia
- Malang State University
- Padang State University
- Padjadjaran University
- Sebelas Maret University
- Semarang State University
- Sepuluh Nopember Institute of Technology
- Surabaya State University
- Syiah Kuala University
- University of Indonesia
- University of North Sumatra
- Yogyakarta State University

=== Iran ===
- National University of Iran

=== Ireland ===
- National University of Ireland

=== Kazakhstan ===
- Al-Farabi Kazakh National University
- Kazakh National Medical University
- L.N.Gumilyov Eurasian National University

=== Lithuania ===
- Vilnius University
- Vilnius Gediminas Technical University
- Mykolas Romeris University
- Vytautas Magnus University (during the interwar period its name was University of Lithuania)
- Lithuanian University of Health Sciences
- Lithuanian Sports University
- Kaunas University of Technology
- Klaipėda University

=== Lesotho ===
- National University of Lesotho

=== Malaysia ===
- International Islamic University Malaysia
- National Defence University of Malaysia
- National University of Malaysia
- Sultan Idris Education University
- Universiti Malaysia Kelantan
- Universiti Malaysia Pahang
- Universiti Malaysia Perlis
- Universiti Malaysia Sabah
- Universiti Malaysia Sarawak
- Universiti Malaysia Terengganu
- Universiti Putra Malaysia
- Universiti Sains Islam Malaysia
- Universiti Sultan Zainal Abidin
- Universiti Teknikal Malaysia Melaka
- Universiti Teknologi MARA
- Universiti Utara Malaysia
- University of Malaya
- University of Science, Malaysia
- University of Technology, Malaysia

=== Mexico ===
- National Autonomous University of Mexico
- National Polytechnic Institute

=== Mongolia ===
- National University of Mongolia

=== Nepal ===
- Tribhuvan University

=== Pakistan ===
- Quaid-i-Azam University
- University of Punjab
- Pakistan Military Academy
- National Defence University, Islamabad
- National College of Arts
- National Textile University
- National University of Computer and Emerging Sciences
- National University of Modern Languages
- National University of Sciences and Technology, Pakistan
- National University of Medical Sciences
- Allama Iqbal Open University

=== Panama ===
- Universidad de Panama
- Universidad Tecnologica de Panama
- Universidad Autonoma de Chiriqui

=== Paraguay ===
- Universidad Nacional de Asuncion
- Universidad Nacional de Concepción
- Universidad Nacional de Itapúa
- Universidad Nacional de Pilar
- Universidad Nacional de Villarrica
- Universidad Nacional del Este

=== Peru ===
- National University of San Marcos
- National University of Engineering
- National Agrarian University
- National University of Education "Enrique Guzmán y Valle"

=== Philippines ===
- University of the Philippines System, composed of eight (8) autonomous universities:
  - University of the Philippines Baguio
  - University of the Philippines Cebu
  - University of the Philippines Diliman
  - University of the Philippines Los Baños
  - University of the Philippines Manila
  - University of the Philippines Mindanao
  - University of the Philippines Visayas
  - University of the Philippines Open University

There is a private university in the Philippines named National University, with several branches.

=== Samoa ===
- National University of Samoa

=== Saudi Arabia ===
- King Saud University

=== Singapore ===
- Nanyang Technological University
- National University of Singapore
- Singapore Institute of Technology
- Singapore Management University
- Singapore University of Social Sciences
- Singapore University of Technology and Design

=== Solomon Islands ===
- Solomon Islands National University

=== Somalia ===
- Somali National University

=== Sri Lanka ===
- University of Colombo (Western Province)
- University of Peradeniya (Central Province)
- University of Ruhuna (Southern Province)
- University of Sri Jayewardenepura (Western Province)
- University of Kelaniya (Western Province)
- University of Moratuwa (Western Province)
- University of Jaffna (Northern Province)
- Eastern University, Sri Lanka (Eastern Province)
- South Eastern University of Sri Lanka, Oluvil (Eastern Province)
- Rajarata University (North Central Province)
- Sabaragamuwa University of Sri Lanka (Sabaragamuwa Province)
- Wayamba University of Sri Lanka, Kuliyapitiya and Makandura (North Western Province)
- Uva Wellassa University (Uva Province)
- University of the Visual & Performing Arts (Western Province)
- Open University of Sri Lanka(distance education)
- University of Ceylon (defunct)
- University of Sri Lanka (defunct)

=== Switzerland ===
- École Polytechnique Fédérale de Lausanne
- ETH Zurich

=== Taiwan ===
Among dozens of public universities, including six research universities:

- National Central University
- National Chung Cheng University
- National Cheng Kung University
- National Yang Ming Chiao Tung University
- National Sun Yat-sen University
- National Taiwan University
- National Taiwan University of Science and Technology
- National Taiwan Normal University
- National Tsing Hua University

=== Thailand ===
- Burapha University
- Chiang Mai University
- Chulalongkorn University
- Kasetsart University
- Khon Kaen University
- King Mongkut's Institute of Technology Ladkrabang
- King Mongkut's University of Technology North Bangkok
- King Mongkut's University of Technology Thonburi
- Prince of Songkla University
- Mahidol University
- Silpakorn University
- Srinakharinwirot University
- Thaksin University
- Thammasat University
- Ubon Ratchathani University

=== Tonga ===
- Tonga National University

=== Ukraine ===
- Cherkasy National University
- Chernihiv Polytechnic National University
- Karazin Kharkiv National University
- National Technical University of Ukraine
- National University of Kyiv-Mohyla Academy
- National Yaroslav Mudryi Law Academy of Ukraine
- Odesa National University
- Oles Honchar Dnipro National University
- Taras Shevchenko National University of Kyiv

=== United States ===
In the United States, the term "national university" connotes the highest institutional level in education, differing in meaning from a "federally-chartered university." In the US, "national university" denotes regionally-outstanding institutions with at least a national admissions strategy, receipt of largescale grants, international research activity, endowments above $350 million, and regional excellence with respective prestige. The concept of national American universities arguably has its origins in the birth of the Association of American Universities, however this association does not encapsulate all national universities in the United States.

Some of the US's federally-chartered places of higher education include:

- George Washington University, chartered by Congress in 1821; Washington long advocated for the establishment of a national university. It is a private institution not connected to the national government.
  - National University School of Law (1869-1954), now part of the George Washington law school
- Haskell Indian Nations University
- Ohio University, chartered in the Northwest Ordinance and first named American Western University
- Southwestern Indian Polytechnic Institute
- United States Air Force Academy
- United States Coast Guard Academy
- United States Merchant Marine Academy
- United States Military Academy
- United States Naval Academy
- Gallaudet University

=== Uruguay ===
- Universidad de la República

=== Uzbekistan ===
- National University of Uzbekistan

=== Vanuatu ===
- National University of Vanuatu

=== Vietnam ===
- Vietnam National University, Hanoi
- Vietnam National University, Ho Chi Minh City

== See also ==
- Polytechnics
- Public university
- University Revolution
