= List of awards and honours received by Gustavo Petro =

Comprehensive list of President Gustavo Petro's awards and honors

Gustavo Petro, the 34th president of Colombia, has received numerous honors in recognition of his career in politics. These include:

== National honors ==
Country	Date	Decoration	Post-nominal letters
Colombia	5 August 2022	Order of Boyacá	ODB
Colombia	5 August 2022	Order of San Carlos	OSC
Colombia	5 August 2022	National Order of Merit	ODM
Colombia	5 August 2022	Order of Merit Colonel Guillermo Fergusson	OGF

== Foreign honors ==
Country	Date	Decoration	Post-nominal letters
Spain	3 May 2023	Order of Isabella the Catholic (1st Class)	CYC
Palestine	3 June 2024	Grand Collar of the State of Palestine	

== Scholastic ==
Chancellor, visitor, governor, rector and fellowships

Location	Date	School	Position
Argentina	18 November 2018	National University of Lanús	Honnorary professor
Atlántico	31 March 2023	University of Atlántico	Honoris Causa
Bolívar	31 March 2023	University of Cartagena	Honoris Causa
Cesar	31 March 2023	Popular University of Cesar	Honoris Causa
Córdoba	31 March 2023	University of Córdoba	Honoris Causa
La Guajira	31 March 2023	University of La Guajira	Honoris Causa
Magdalena	31 March 2023	University of Magdalena	Honoris Causa
Sucre	31 March 2023	University of Sucre	Honoris Causa
Costa Rica	28 August 2023	University for Peace	Honoris Causa
