= List of Iota Phi Theta chapters =

Iota Phi Theta is an historically African American fraternity founded in 1963 at Morgan State University in Maryland. Following is a list of collegiate and alumni chapters of Iota Phi Theta. Its chapters start as colonies and are assigned a Greek letter chapter designation after demonstrating viability for one year.

== Collegiate chapters ==
In the following list of collegiate chapters, active chapters are indicated in bold and inactive chapters are in italic.

Chapter	Charter date and range	Institution	City or county	State or country	Status	Ref.
**Alpha**	September 19, 1963	Morgan State University	Baltimore	Maryland	Active	
Beta	October 19, 1967	Hampton University	Hampton	Virginia	Inactive	
**Gamma**	1967	Delaware State University	Dover	Delaware	Active	
**Delta**	1968	Norfolk State University	Norfolk	Virginia	Active	
**Epsilon**	1968	New Jersey City University	Jersey City	New Jersey	Active	
**Zeta**	1969–xxxx ?, 2022	North Carolina A&T State University	Greensboro	North Carolina	Active	
**Eta**	May 15, 1969	Virginia State University	Ettrick	Virginia	Active	
**Theta**	June 21, 1969	University of the District of Columbia	Washington	District of Columbia	Active	
**Iota**	1971–xxxx ?, 2008	Elizabeth City State University	Elizabeth City	North Carolina	Active	
**Kappa**	April 30, 1970	Winston-Salem State University	Winston-Salem	North Carolina	Active	
**Lambda**	1971–1975, 1988, 1998	Prairie View A&M University	Prairie View	Texas	Active	
**Mu**	1971	Bowie State University	Prince George's County	Maryland	Active	
Nu	August 13, 1971–xxxx ?	University of Maryland, College Park	College Park	Maryland	Inactive	
**Xi**	1972	Fayetteville State University	Fayetteville	North Carolina	Active	
**Omicron**	1973	Northeastern University	Boston	Massachusetts	Active	
**Pi**	1973	Boston University	Boston	Massachusetts	Active	
Rho	1973–xxxx ?	Towson University	Towson	Maryland	Inactive	
Sigma	1974	Boston College	Chestnut Hill	Massachusetts	Inactive	(Note: Boston College prohibited fraternities circa 1986.)
**Tau**	1974	American International College	Springfield	Massachusetts	Active	
**Upsilon**	1974	Southern Illinois University Carbondale	Carbondale	Illinois	Active	
**Phi**	1975	Rowan University	Glassboro	New Jersey	Active	
Chi	1975–19xx	University of Massachusetts Boston	Boston	Massachusetts	Inactive	(Note: Chapter closed because UMass Boston no longer allows fraternities or sororities.)
**Psi**	1975	Coppin State University	Baltimore	Maryland	Active	
Omega	1976–198x?	Western New England University	Springfield	Massachusetts	Inactive	(Note: The last social, Greek letter organization at Western New England University disbanded in 1995.)
**Alpha Alpha**	1976	Stockton University	Galloway Township	New Jersey	Active	
**Alpha Beta**	April 17, 1976	Southern Illinois University Edwardsville	Edwardsville	Illinois	Active	
Alpha Gamma	1976–xxxx ?	Morris Brown College	Atlanta	Georgia	Inactive	
**Alpha Delta**	1978	Rutgers University–Camden	Camden, New Jersey	New Jersey	Active	
**Alpha Epsilon**	1977	North Carolina Central University	Durham	North Carolina	Active	
**Alpha Zeta**	1978	LIU Post	Brookville	New York	Active	
**Alpha Eta**	1979	Southern University	Baton Rouge	Louisiana	Active	
Alpha Theta	1979–19xx ?	Salem State University	Salem	Massachusetts	Inactive	
Alpha Iota	1979–20xx ?	Wilberforce University	Wilberforce	Ohio	Inactive	
Alpha Kappa	1980–2015 ?	Dillard University	New Orleans	Louisiana	Inactive	
**Alpha Lambda**	April 11, 1980	University of Illinois at Urbana-Champaign	Urbana	Illinois	Active	
**Alpha Mu**	1980	Central State University	Wilberforce	Ohio	Active	
Alpha Nu	1980–xxxx ?	Bridgewater State University	Bridgewater	Massachusetts	Inactive	
Alpha Xi	1981–19xx ?	Westfield State College	Westfield	Massachusetts	Inactive	(Note: Westfield State University no longer allows fraternities.)
**Alpha Omicron**	March 31, 1981	Kentucky State University	Frankfort	Kentucky	Active	
**Alpha Pi**	November 20, 1981	Morehouse College	Atlanta	Georgia	Active	
**Alpha Rho**	1982–xxxx ?, 2022 ?	Illinois State University	Normal	Illinois	Active	
Alpha Sigma	1983–xxxx ?	University of Maryland, Baltimore County	Baltimore County	Maryland	Inactive	
**Alpha Tau**	1983	Howard University	Washington	District of Columbia	Active	
**Alpha Upsilon**	1983–xxxx ?	DePaul University	Chicago	Illinois	Inactive	
**Alpha Phi**	1983	City University of New York	New York City	New York	Active	
Alpha Chi	1983–xxxx ?	San Francisco State University	San Francisco	California	Inactive	
**Alpha Psi**	1983	Rutgers University–New Brunswick	New Brunsiwick	New Jersey	Active	
**Beta Alpha**	1983	William Paterson University	Wayne	New Jersey	Active	
**Beta Beta**	1983	University of Massachusetts Amherst	Amherst	Massachusetts	Active	
**Beta Gamma**	1986	Eastern Illinois University	Charleston	Illinois	Active	
**Beta Delta**	1987–2000, 2012	Wilmington College	Wilmington	Ohio	Active	
Beta Epsilon	1987–20xx ?	University of Cincinnati	Cincinnati	Ohio	Inactive	
Beta Zeta	1987–xxxx ?	University of Hartford	West Hartford	Connecticut	Inactive	
Beta Eta	1987–xxxx ?	University of Wyoming	Laramie	Wyoming	Inactive	
Beta Theta	April 25, 1988	Johnson C. Smith University	Charlotte	North Carolina	Active	
Beta Iota	1988–xxxx ?	Urbana University	Urbana	Ohio	Inactive	(Note: Urbana University closed in 2020.)
Beta Kappa	1988–xxxx ?	Kutztown University of Pennsylvania	Kutztown	Pennsylvania	Inactive	
Beta Lambda	1988–xxxx ?	University of Delaware	Newark	Delaware	Inactive	
**Beta Mu**	1988	Ohio State University	Columbus	Ohio	Active	
**Beta Nu**	1988	Northern Illinois University	DeKalb	Illinois	Active	
**Beta Xi**	1988	Kean University	Hillside	New Jersey	Active	
Beta Omicron (First)	1988	DePaul University	Chicago	Illinois	Reassigned	
Beta Pi	April 10, 1989 – xxxx ?	University of Akron	Akron	Ohio	Inactive	
**Beta Rho**	1990	Cheney University of Pennsylvania	Cheney	Pennsylvania	Active	(Note: This chapter previously included two campuses, but is no longer affiliated with West Chester University.)
Beta Sigma	1992–xxxx ?	University of Northern Colorado	Greeley	Colorado	Inactive	
**Beta Tau**	1994	University of Missouri	Columbia	Missouri	Active	
**Beta Upsilon**	January 15, 1994	California State University, East Bay	Hayward	California	Active	
Beta Phi	1995–xxxx ?	University of Massachusetts Dartmouth	Dartmouth	Massachusetts	Inactive	
**Beta Chi**	1996	Bethune–Cookman University	Daytona Beach	Florida	Active	
Beta Psi	1996–2001	Arizona State University	Tempe	Arizona	Inactive	
Gamma Alpha	1996–xxxx ?	Drexel University	Philadelphia	Pennsylvania	Inactive	
Gamma Beta	1996–xxxx ?	Fitchburg State University	Fitchburg	Massachusetts	Inactive	
**Gamma Gamma**	1997	University of Wisconsin–Milwaukee	Milwaukee	Wisconsin	Active	
**Gamma Delta**	1997	Indiana University Bloomington	Bloomington	Indiana	Active	
Gamma Epsilon	1997–20xx ?	West Virginia University	Morgantown	West Virginia	Inactive	
Gamma Zeta	1997–xxxx ?	University of California, Berkeley	Berkeley	California	Inactive	
Gamma Eta	1997–20xx ?	Ferris State University	Big Rapids	Michigan	Inactive	
Gamma Theta	1997–202x ?	Morehead State University	Morehead	Kentucky	Inactive	
**Gamma Iota**	May 5, 1997	Montclair State University	Montclair	New Jersey	Active	
Gamma Kappa	1997-202x?	University of Oklahoma	Norman	Oklahoma	Inactive	
Gamma Lambda	1998–202x ?	Wright State University	Dayton	Ohio	Inactive	
Gamma Mu	March 6, 1998	Michigan State University	East Lansing	Michigan	Inactive	
**Gamma Nu**	1998	University of Toledo	Toledo	Ohio	Active	
Gamma Xi	1998–xxxx ?	North Carolina State University	Raleigh	North Carolina	Inactive	
**Gamma Omicron**	1998	University of Florida	Gainesville	Florida	Active	
Gamma Pi	1998–xxxx ?	California State University, Sacramento	Sacramento	California	Inactive	
**Gamma Rho**	1998	Eastern Michigan University	Ypsilanti	Michigan	Active	
Gamma Sigma	1998–xxxx ?	Missouri State University	Springfield	Missouri	Inactive	
**Gamma Tau**	1998	Shaw University	Raleigh	North Carolina	Active	
Gamma Upsilon	1998–20xx?	University of Central Arkansas	Conway	Arkansas	Inactive	
**Gamma Phi**	1999	California State University, Long Beach	Long Beach	California	Active	(Note: CSU Long Beach does not recognize this chapter.)
**Gamma Chi**	January 24, 1998	Florida A&M University	Tallahassee	Florida	Active	
**Gamma Psi**	1999	Mississippi State University	Starkville	Mississippi	Active	
**Beta Omicron**	1999	Chicago State University	Chicago	Illinois	Active	
Delta Alpha	1999–20xx ?	University of Central Missouri	Warrensburg	Missouri	Inactive	
**Delta Beta**	1999	Tennessee State University	Nashville	Tennessee	Active	
Delta Gamma	1999–xxxx ?	State University of New York at Buffalo	Buffalo	New York	Inactive	
Delta Delta	March 4, 1999	Virginia Commonwealth University	Richmond	Virginia	Inactive	
**Delta Epsilon**	2000	Indianapolis City Wide	Indianapolis	Indiana	Active	
Delta Zeta	July 1, 2000 – 2007	Indiana State University	Terre Haute	Indiana	Inactive	
**Delta Eta**	2000	Alabama State University	Montgomery	Alabama	Active	
**Delta Theta**	2001	Fort Valley State University	Fort Valley	Georgia	Active	
**Delta Iota**	2001	Fairleigh Dickinson University	Teaneck	New Jersey	Active	
**Delta Kappa**		University of North Texas	Denton	Texas	Active	
Delta Lambda	2001–xxxx ?	University of Virginia	Charlottesville	Virginia	Inactive	
**Delta Mu**	2001	Honolulu City Wide	Honolulu	Hawaii	Active	(Note: Delta Mu chapter was previously affiliated with the University of Hawaiʻi.)
Delta Nu	2000–20xx ?	University of Arkansas	Fayetteville	Arkansas	Inactive	
Delta Xi	2000–20xx ?	Stephen F. Austin State University	Nacogdoches	Texas	Inactive	
**Delta Omicron**	2001	Purdue University	West Lafayette	Indiana	Active	
Delta Pi	2000–20xx ?	State University of New York at Oneonta	Oneonta	New York	Inactive	
**Delta Rho**	2001	University at Albany, SUNY	Albany	New York	Active	
Delta Sigma	2001–2021	Johnson & Wales University	North Miami	Florida	Inactive	(Note: Chapter closed when the university closed its Florida campus in 2021.)
**Delta Tau**	2001	Cleveland State University	Cleveland	Ohio	Active	
**Delta Upsilon**	2001	Western Michigan University	Kalamazoo	Michigan	Active	
**Delta Phi**	2002	Valdosta State University	Valdosta	Georgia	Active	
**Delta Chi**	2003	San Jose State University	San Jose	California	Active	
**Delta Psi**	August 1, 2003	Jackson State University	Jackson	Mississippi	Active	
**Epsilon Alpha**		Texas Southern University	Houston	Texas	Active	
**Epsilon Beta**	2003	Clark Atlanta University	Atlanta	Georgia	Active	
Epsilon Gamma	2003–20xx?	University of Louisiana at Monroe	Monroe	Louisiana	Inactive	
**Epsilon Delta**		Grambling State University	Grambling	Louisiana	Active	
**Epsilon Epsilon**	2000	Lincoln University	Oxford	Pennsylvania	Active	
**Epsilon Zeta**	October 19, 2002	Frostburg State University	Frostburg	Maryland	Active	
**Epsilon Eta**	March 31, 2002	University of Central Florida	Orlando	Florida	Active	
Epsilon Theta	2002–202x ?	Murray State University	Murray	Kentucky	Inactive	
**Epsilon Iota**	2002	University of Louisville	Louisville	Kentucky	Active	
Epsilon Kappa	2003–20xx ?	McMurry University	Abilene	Texas	Inactive	
**Epsilon Lambda**	2003	Fairleigh Dickinson University	Madison	New Jersey	Active	
**Epsilon Mu**	2003	Indiana University Northwest	Gary	Indiana	Active	
Epsilon Nu	2002–20xx ?	Florida State University	Tallahassee	Florida	Inactive	
**Epsilon Xi**	2004	University of West Georgia	Carrollton	Georgia	Active	
Epsilon Omicron	2004–2021	Jacksonville State University	Jacksonville	Alabama	Inactive	
**Epsilon Pi**	June 30, 2004	East Carolina University	Greenville	North Carolina	Active	
Epsilon Rho	2004–20xx ?	University of Nebraska–Lincoln	Lincoln	Nebraska	Inactive	
Epsilon Sigma	2005–20xx ?	Cornell University	Ithaca	New York	Inactive	(Note: Chapter started as a colony in 2000.)
**Epsilon Tau**	2005	New Jersey Institute of Technology	Newark	New Jersey	Active	(Note: The chapter previously included two institutions, but Rutgers University–Newark is no longer affiliated with the chapter.)
Epsilon Upsilon	2005–20xx ?	Rhode Island College	Providence	Rhode Island	Inactive	
Epsilon Phi	2005–20xx ?	University of Texas at San Antonio	San Antonio	Texas	Inactive	
Epsilon Chi	2005–20xx ?	Lebanon Valley College	Annville	Pennsylvania	Inactive	
**Epsilon Psi**	2005	University of Southern Mississippi	Hattiesburg	Mississippi	Active	
Zeta Alpha	2005–20xx ?	Northwood University	Schenectady	New York	Inactive	
Zeta Beta	2005–2012 ?	Louisiana State University	Baton Rouge	Louisiana	Inactive	(Note: The chapter started as a colony before 1999, but went dormant in 2001. The colony was reactivated in the spring of 2004.)
Zeta Gamma	2005–20xx?	Union College	Schenectady	New York	Inactive	
**Zeta Delta**	2005	University of South Florida	Tampa	Florida	Active	
Zeta Epsilon	2005–20xx ?	University of Arkansas at Little Rock	Little Rock	Arkansas	Inactive	
**Zeta Zeta**	2005	Florida Memorial University	Miami Gardens	Florida	Active	
Zeta Eta	2005–20xx ?	University of Houston	Houston	Texas	Inactive	
**Zeta Theta**	March 28, 2008	University of Connecticut	Storrs	Connecticut	Active	(Note: Chapter started as a colony in 1999.)
**Zeta Iota**	2005	Shippensburg University of Pennsylvania	Shippensburg	Pennsylvania	Active	
**Zeta Kappa**	2006	Edward Waters University	Jacksonville	Florida	Active	
Zeta Lambda	2006–20xx ?	South Carolina State University	Orangeburg	South Carolina	Inactive	
**Zeta Mu**	200x ?	McNeese State University	Lake Charles	Louisiana	Active	
**Zeta Nu**	2006	University of Maryland Eastern Shore	Princess Anne	Maryland	Active	
**Zeta Xi**	2006	Lincoln University	Jefferson City	Missouri	Active	
**Zeta Omicron**	2006	Sam Houston State University	Huntsville	Texas	Active	
**Zeta Pi**	2007	Albany State University	Albany	Georgia	Active	
Zeta Rho	2008–20xx	Old Dominion University	Norfolk	Virginia	Inactive	
Zeta Sigma	2008–20xx	California State University, Dominguez Hills	Carson	California	Inactive	
**Zeta Tau**	2008	George Mason University	Fairfax	Virginia	Active	
Zeta Upsilon	2008–20xx ?	Southeast Missouri State University	Cape Girardeau	Missouri	Inactive	
**Zeta Phi**	2008	Saint Louis City Wide	St. Louis	Missouri	Active	
**Zeta Chi**	2008	Georgia Southern University	Statesboro	Georgia	Active	
**Zeta Psi**	2009	University of Kentucky	Lexington	Kentucky	Active	
**Eta Alpha**	2009	Pennsylvania State University	State College	Pennsylvania	Active	
Eta Beta	2009–20xx ?	University of South Carolina	Columbia	South Carolina	Inactive	
**Eta Gamma**	2009	Savannah State University	Savannah	Georgia	Active	
Eta Delta	2009–2021 ?	Eastern Kentucky University	Richmond	Kentucky	Inactive	
**Eta Epsilon**	2009	University of Memphis	Memphis	Tennessee	Active	
Eta Zeta	2009–20xx ?	Youngstown State University	Youngstown	Ohio	Inactive	
**Eta Eta**	2009	Wayne State University	Detroit	Michigan	Active	
Eta Theta	2009–xxxx ?	University of Michigan	Ann Arbor	Michigan	Inactive	
Eta Iota	2009–20xx ?	Eastern Washington University	Cheney	Washington	Inactive	
**Eta Kappa**	2009	Mississippi Valley State University	Mississippi Valley State	Mississippi	Active	
Eta Lambda	2009–20xx ?	Western Illinois University	Macomb	Illinois	Inactive	
**Eta Mu**	2009	Bloomfield College	Bloomfield	New Jersey	Active	
**Eta Nu**	2009	Duquesne University	Pittsburgh	Pennsylvania	Active	
Eta Xi	2009–20xx ?	Virginia Tech	Blacksburg	Virginia	Inactive	
Eta Omicron	2009–20xx ?	Grand Valley State University	Allendale	Michigan	Inactive	
**Eta Pi**	2010	University of Tennessee at Martin	Martin	Tennessee	Active	
**Eta Rho**	April 10, 2010	Western Kentucky University	Green	Kentucky	Active	
Eta Sigma	2010–20xx?	Florida International University	Miami	Florida	Inactive	
**Eta Tau**	2010	Arkansas State University	Jonesboro	Arkansas	Active	
**Eta Upsilon**	2010	Georgia State University	Atlanta	Georgia	Active	
**Eta Phi**	2011	Middle Tennessee State University	Murfreesboro	Tennessee	Active	
Eta Chi	2011–201x ?	Midland University	Fremont	Nebraska	Inactive	
Eta Psi	2011–20xx ?	Chestnut Hill College	Philadelphia	Pennsylvania	Inactive	(Note: Chestnut Hill College currently has no social, Greek letter organizations.)
Theta Alpha	2012–20xx ?	Indiana University of Pennsylvania	Indiana County	Pennsylvania	Inactive	
**Theta Beta**	January 11, 2012	University of Nevada, Las Vegas	Paradise	Nevada	Active	
Theta Gamma	2012–20xx ?	California State University, San Bernardino	San Bernardino	California	Inactive	
Theta Delta	2012–20xx ?	Robert Morris University	Moon Township	Pennsylvania	Inactive	
Theta Epsilon	2012–20xx ?	Randolph–Macon College	Ashland	Virginia	Inactive	
**Theta Zeta**	2013	University of Tennessee	Knoxville	Tennessee	Active	
**Theta Eta**	2013	Kansas State University	Manhattan	Kansas	Active	
Theta Theta	2013–20xx ?	Minnesota State University, Mankato	Mankato	Minnesota	Inactive	
Theta Iota	2013–20xx ?	University of Mississippi	Oxford	Mississippi	Inactive	
**Theta Kappa**	2013	Benedict College	Columbia	South Carolina	Active	
Theta Lambda	2013-20xx ?	Spalding University	Louisville	Kentucky	Inactive	
Theta Mu	2013-201x?	Diego Luis Cordoba Technological University of Choco	Quibdó	Chocó, Colombia	Inactive	
Theta Nu	2013–20xx ?	University of Texas at Arlington	Arlington	Texas	Inactive	
**Theta Xi**	December 9, 2013	Wiley College	Marshall	Texas	Active	
Theta Omicron	2014–201x ?	Virginia Union University	Richmond	Virginia	Inactive	
**Theta Pi**	2014	University of North Florida	Jacksonville	Florida	Active	
Theta Rho	2014–20xx ?	Syracuse University	Syracuse	New York	Inactive	
Theta Sigma	2014–20xx ?	Sacred Heart University	Fairfield	Connecticut	Inactive	
Theta Tau	2014–20xx ?	Columbus State University	Columbus	Georgia	Inactive	
**Theta Upsilon**	201x ?	Southern Arkansas University	Magnolia	Arkansas	Active	
**Theta Phi**	2016	St. Augustine's University	Raleigh	North Carolina	Active	
**Theta Chi**	May 4, 2017	Kent State University	Kent	Ohio	Active	
**Theta Psi**	May 4, 2017	Livingstone College	Salisbury	North Carolina	Active	
**Iota Alpha**	June 27, 2019	Miles College	Fairfield	Alabama	Active	
Iota Beta	October 7, 2019 – 202x ?	Southern Connecticut State University	New Haven	Connecticut	Inactive	
**Iota Gamma**	December 3, 2020	Caldwell University	Caldwell	New Jersey	Active	
**Iota Delta**	April 9, 2023	Texas A&M University–Commerce	Commerce	Texas	Active	
**Iota Epsilon**			Columbus	Ohio	Active	
**Iota Zeta**	April 5, 2024	Oakland University			Active	
**Iota Eta**	2023	Huston-Tillotson University	Austin	Texas	Active	
**Iota Theta**	1997-2001, 2023	Texas State University	San Marcos	Texas	Active	
**Iota Iota**	August 26, 2025	Radford University	Radford	Virginia	Active	
**Iota Kappa**		University of South Alabama	Mobile	Alabama	Active	
**Iota Lambda**		University of Miami	Coral Gables	Florida	Active	
**Iota Nu**	February 20, 2024	University of North Carolina at Pembroke	Pembroke	North Carolina	Active	
**Claflin colony**		Claflin University	Orangeburg	South Carolina	Active	

== Alumni chapters ==
In the following list of alumni chapters, active chapters are indicated in bold and inactive chapters are in italics.

Chapter	Chartered	City or county	State, prefecture, or country	Status	Ref.
Alpha Omega	1965	Baltimore	Maryland	Active	
Beta Omega	1970	Washington	District of Columbia	Active	
Gamma Omega	1973	Hampton	Virginia	Active	
Delta Omega	1973	Brighton	Massachusetts	Active	
Epsilon Omega	December 5, 1976	Atlanta	Georgia	Active	
Zeta Omega	1978	Salem and Atlantic City	New Jersey	Active	
Eta Omega	1978	Chicago	Illinois	Active	
Theta Omega	1980	Norfolk	Virginia	Active	
Iota Omega	October 11, 1981	Charlotte	North Carolina	Active	
Kappa Omega	1981	Champaign County and McLean County	Illinois	Active	
Lambda Omega	1982	Carbondale	Illinois	Active	
Mu Omega	1982	St. Louis and East St. Louis	Missouri and Illinois	Active	
Nu Omega	1982	Greensboro	North Carolina	Active	
Xi Omega	1983	San Francisco	California	Active	
Omicron Omega	1984	Richmond	Virginia	Active	
Pi Omega	1984	New York City	New York	Active	
Rho Omega	1984	Springfield	Massachusetts	Active	
Sigma Omega		New Orleans	Louisiana	Active	
Tau Omega	1985	Norwich and Hartford	Connecticut	Active	
Upsilon Omega	1987	Los Angeles	California	Active	
Phi Omega	1987	Springfield and Northern New Jersey	New Jersey	Active	
Chi Omega	1989	Philadelphia and Lafayette Hill	Pennsylvania	Active	
Psi Omega	1989	Columbia	Maryland	Active	
Alpha Alpha Omega	1993	Indianapolis	Indiana	Active	
Alpha Beta Omega	1996	Denver	Colorado	Active	
Alpha Gamma Omega	1996	Detroit	Michigan	Active	
Alpha Delta Omega	1999	Milwaukee	Wisconsin	Active	
Alpha Epsilon Omega	1999	Raleigh, Durham, and Chapel Hill	North Carolina	Active	
Alpha Zeta Omega	2000	San Jose	California	Active	
Alpha Eta Omega	2000	Columbus	Ohio	Active	
Alpha Theta Omega	2001	South Side Chicago	Illinois	Active	
Alpha Iota Omega				Memorial	
Alpha Kappa Omega	2003	Lincoln	Nebraska	Active	
Alpha Lambda Omega	2003	Miami	Florida	Active	
Alpha Mu Omega	September 8, 2003	Dallas and Fort Worth	Texas	Active	
Alpha Nu Omega	August 1, 2003	Houston	Texas	Active	
Alpha Xi Omega	2003	Rancocas	New Jersey	Active	
Alpha Omicron Omega	2004	Fayetteville, Fort Bragg, and Pope AFB	North Carolina	Active	
Alpha Pi Omega	2004	Montgomery	Alabama	Active	
Alpha Rho Omega	2004	Seoul	South Korea	Active	
Alpha Sigma Omega	2006	Northwest Indiana	Indiana	Active	
Alpha Tau Omega	2006	Saint Louis	Missouri	Active	
Alpha Upsilon Omega	2007	Seattle	Washington	Active	
Alpha Phi Omega	2007	Nashville	Tennessee	Active	
Alpha Chi Omega	2007	Columbia	South Carolina	Active	
Alpha Psi Omega	2007	Hattiesburg	Mississippi	Active	
Alpha Omega Omega		Baton Rouge	Louisiana	Active	
Beta Alpha Omega	2006	Northern Virginia	Virginia	Active	
Beta Beta Omega	2007	Greenville	North Carolina	Active	
Beta Gamma Omega	2007	Central Virginia	Virginia	Active	
Beta Delta Omega	2008	Sacramento	California	Active	
Beta Epsilon Omega	2008	statewide	Delaware	Active	
Beta Zeta Omega	2008	Victorville	California	Active	
Beta Eta Omega	2008	Savannah and Fort Stewart	Georgia	Active	
Beta Theta Omega	2009	Pittsburgh	Pennsylvania	Active	
Beta Iota Omega	2009	Omaha	Nebraska	Active	
Beta Kappa Omega	February 2019	San Antonio	Texas	Active	
Beta Lambda Omega	2009	Cleveland	Ohio	Active	
Beta Mu Omega	2009	Tallahassee	Florida	Active	
Beta Nu Omega	2009	Fort Knox and Louisville	Kentucky	Active	
Beta Xi Omega	2009	Memphis	Tennessee	Active	
Beta Omicron Omega	2009	Pittsburgh	Pennsylvania	Active	
Beta Pi Omega	2009		Okinawa, Japan	Active	
Beta Rho Omega	2009	Long Island	New York	Active	
Beta Sigma Omega	2009	Evanston	Illinois	Active	
Beta Tau Omega	2009	Central Maryland	Maryland	Active	
Beta Upsilon Omega	2010	Gwinnett County and Douglasville	Georgia	Active	
Beta Phi Omega		Prince George's County	Maryland	Active	
Beta Chi Omega	July 23, 2010	Little Rock	Arkansas	Active	
Beta Psi Omega	October 1, 2010	DeKalb County	Georgia	Active	
Beta Omega Omega	2011	Dayton	Ohio	Active	
Gamma Alpha Omega	2011	Killeen, Austin, and Fort Cavazos	Texas	Active	
Gamma Beta Omega	2011	Las Vegas	Nevada	Active	
Gamma Gamma Omega	2011	Lakewood	California	Active	
Gamma Delta Omega	2011	Brandon	Florida	Active	
Gamma Epsilon Omega	2011	Winter Park and Orlando	Florida	Active	
Gamma Zeta Omega	2012	Montclair	New Jersey	Active	
Gamma Eta Omega	2012	Henrico County	Virginia	Active	
Gamma Theta Omega	2012	Minneapolis and St. Paul	Minnesota	Active	
Gamma Iota Omega	2012	Kansas City	Missouri	Active	
Gamma Kappa Omega	2012	Augusta	Georgia	Active	
Gamma Lambda Omega	2013	Piedmont Triad	North Carolina	Active	
Gamma Mu Omega	2013	Jacksonville	Florida	Active	
Gamma Nu Omega	2013	Huntersville	North Carolina	Active	
Gamma Xi Omega	2013	Cincinnati	Ohio	Active	
Gamma Omicron Omega	2013	Baltimore	Maryland	Active	
Gamma Pi Omega	2014	Joliet	Illinois	Active	
Gamma Rho Omega	2014	Akron	Ohio	Active	
Gamma Sigma Omega	2015	Phoenix	Arizona	Active	
Gamma Tau Omega	2015	Huntsville and Harvest	Alabama	Active	
Gamma Upsilon Omega	August 15, 2018	Fort Bend County, Southwest Houston, and Missouri City	Texas	Active	
Gamma Phi Omega	December 5, 2018	Buffalo	New York	Active	
Gamma Chi Omega	June 7, 2019	Chester and Delaware County	Pennsylvania	Active	
Gamma Psi Omega	October 7, 2019	Albany	New York	Active	
Gamma Omega Omega	August 6, 2020	Clarksville	Tennessee	Active	
Delta Alpha Omega	August 14, 2020	Harrisburg	Pennsylvania	Active	
Delta Beta Omega	January 12, 2021	Charles County	Maryland	Active	
Delta Gamma Omega	May 27, 2021	Shreveport	Louisiana	Active	
Delta Delta Omega	May 27, 2021	Carroll County	Georgia	Active	
Delta Epsilon Omega	May 27, 2021	Louisville and Frankfort	Kentucky	Active	
Delta Zeta Omega	May 27, 2021	Camden and Gloucester County	New Jersey	Active	
Delta Eta Omega	June 18, 2021	Birmingham	Alabama	Active	
Delta Xi Omega	February 24, 2024	Tucson	Arizona	Active	
