= List of honorary degrees awarded to Noam Chomsky =

This is a list of honorary degrees awarded to the linguist, philosopher and political activist Noam Chomsky.

== List ==
Year	Degree	University	Notes
2013	D.H.L.	American University of Beirut	
1995		Amherst College	
1971		Bard College	
2003		Central Connecticut State University	
1999	Litt.D.	Columbia University	
2015		Drexel University	
		Georgetown University	
1992		Gettysburg College	
2000	LL.D.	Harvard University	
2012	Ph.D.	International School for Advanced Studies	aka SISSA (Note: SISSA = Scuola Internazionale Superiore di Studi Avanzati)
		Islamic University of Gaza	
1970	D.H.L.	Loyola University Chicago	
1998	D.Litt.	McGill University	
2004	Ph.D.	National and Kapodistrian University of Athens	
2010	D.H.C.	National Autonomous University of Mexico	aka UNAM (Note: UNAM = Universidad Nacional Autónoma de México)
2010		National Tsing Hua University	
2002	D.H.C.	National University of Colombia	
2001	D.H.C.	National University of Comahue	
2017	D.H.C.	National University of Lanús	Lanús, Argentina
2010		Peking University	
1998		Rovira i Virgili University	
2006		Santo Domingo Institute of Technology	aka INTEC
1999	Phc. (Note: "Chomsky's sojourn in Siena was organized twenty years after his visit to the Scuola Normale Superiore of Pisa, an event which, through the memorable Pisa Lectures, has profoundly influenced the field of theoretical linguistics ever since. In connection with this anniversary, Chomsky received, on October 27, 1999, the 'Perfezionamento honoris causa, ' the honorary degree delivered by the Scuola Normale Superiore. In that occasion, he gave the Galileo Lecture 'Perspectives on Language and Mind', which traces central ideas of current scientific linguistics and of the modern cognitive sciences to their roots in classical thought, starting with Galileo Galilei's famous praise of the 'marvelous invention, 'alphabetic writing, which allows us to communicate with other people, no matter how distant in space and time." (Belletti & Rizzi 2002))	Scuola Normale Superiore di Pisa	
1970	D.H.L.	Swarthmore College	
2005		University of Bologna (Note: "Il 16 aprile 2004 Noam Chomsky ha ricevuto la Laurea honoris causa in Lettere dall'Ateneo fiorentino, 'quale riconoscimento allo studioso eminente nel campo delle scienze del linguaggio e delle capacità cognitive e all'intellettuale da sempre impegnato in difesa della libertà di pensiero'. Il 1º aprile 2005 ha ricevuto la Laurea honoris causa in Psicologia dall'Università di Bologna. Il 17 settembre 2012 Noam Chomsky ha ricevuto un PhD honoris causa in Neuroscienze conferitogli dalla Scuola Internazionale Superiore di Studi Avanzati di Trieste." Translation: "On 16 April 2004, the University of Florence conferred an honorary Arts degree on Noam Chomsky, 'in recognition of his eminence as a scholar in the field of linguistics and cognitive science, and as a public intellectual who has never ceased to engage in the defense of freedom of thought.' On 1 April 2005, he received an honorary degree in Psychology from Bologna University. On 17 September 2012 he was awarded an honortary Phd in neurosciences from Trieste's International School for Advanced Studies." (cheFare n.d.))	
2020	D.H.C.	University of Brasília	
		University of Buenos Aires	
2001		University of Calcutta	
1995		University of Cambridge	
1967	D.H.L.	University of Chicago	
2006	D.H.C	University of Chile	
1999		University of Connecticut	
		University of Cyprus	
1972		University of Delhi	
2004		University of Florence	
2006	D.H.C.	University of La Frontera	
1999	D.Litt.	University of Guelph	
		University of Ljubljana	
1967		University of London	
1973		University of Massachusetts	
1984	L.H.D.	University of Pennsylvania	
2012	D.Litt.	University of St Andrews	
2000		University of Toronto	
2000	D.Litt.	University of Western Ontario	
2007	FDhc	Uppsala University	
		Visva-Bharati University	
		Vrije Universiteit Brussel	

== See also ==
- List of honorary degrees

== Sources ==
- Barsky, Robert F. (1997). Noam Chomsky: A Life of Dissent. Cambridge, MA: MIT Press. ISBN 978-0-262-02418-1.
- Belletti, Adriana; Rizzi, Luigi, eds. (2002). "Preface". On Nature and Language. Cambridge University Press. pp. vii–x. doi:10.1017/cbo9780511613876.001. ISBN 978-0-511-61387-6.
- "Certificate of Doctor Honoris Causa" (PDF) (in Spanish). National University of Lanús. July 13, 2017.
- Chomsky, Noam (2005). "Universals of Human Nature". Psychotherapy and Psychosomatics. 74 (5): 263–268. doi:10.1159/000086316. ISSN 0033-3190. PMID 16088263. "This paper is based on the address delivered by Professor Chomsky while receiving his honorary degree in Psychology at the University of Bologna, Italy, April 1, 2000."
- Chomsky, Noam (September 29, 2006). "Noam Chomsky on America's Foreign Policy" (Interview). Interviewed by Maria Hinojosa. PBS. Archived from the original on December 22, 2015.
- "Class of '99, Commence!". New York: Columbia University. September 1999.
- "Dará la UNAM honoris causa a Vargas Llosa y Chomsky". universaria México (in Spanish). September 20, 2010.
- "Degrees of parochialism". Hindustan Times. August 26, 2010. "Noam Chomsky was awarded an honorary doctorate by Calcutta University in 2001."
- "Distinción Doctor Honoris Causa" (in Spanish). Universidad de Chile. n.d.
- "El Nuevo Orden Según Chomsky". El Tiempo (in Spanish). May 16, 2002.
- "Eleven honorary degrees awarded at Spring 1998 convocations" (Press release). McGill University. May 27, 1998.
- Falcone, Alissa (April 20, 2015). "Drexel Announces 2015 Honorary Degree Recipients". Drexel University. Archived from the original on December 18, 2015.
- "Five named to receive honorary degrees". Uconn Advance. May 10, 1999.
- "Former Honorary Degree Recipients". AUB.
- Gibson, Stacey (June 24, 2000). "Honorary Degrees: Honorary doctorates given at spring convocation ceremonies". University of Toronto Magazine.
- "Honorary Degree Interviews: Noam Chomsky". The Saint. St Andrews. June 20, 2012.
- "Honorary Degree List". Loyola University Chicago. n.d.
- "Honorary Degree Recipients". University of Pennsylvania. n.d. Archived from the original on June 12, 2019.
- "Honorary degree recipients". Gettysburg College.
- "Honorary Degree Recipients 1993-2018" (PDF). Harvard University. n.d.
- "Honorary Degree Recipients by Name". Amherst College.
- "Honorary Doctors of the Faculty of Languages". Uppsala University.
- "INTEC otorgará Honoris Causa a Premio Nobel de Economía" (in Spanish). Santo Somingo: INTEC. September 28, 2015.
- Lent, John A.; Amazeen, Michelle A. (August 5, 2015). Key Thinkers in Critical Communication Scholarship: From the Pioneers to the Next Generation. Palgrave Macmillan. p. 2. ISBN 978-1-137-46342-5. Archived from the original on June 3, 2016.
- Lyons, John (1978). Noam Chomsky (revised ed.). Harmondsworth: Penguin. ISBN 978-0-14-004370-9.
- "Noam Chomsky". cheFare (in Italian). n.d.
- "Noam Chomsky". Tarragona: URV. October 30, 1998.
- "Noam Chomsky". MIT Linguistics Program. 2002 – via chomsky.info.
- "Noam Chomsky". Contemporary Authors Online. Biography in Context. Detroit, MI: Gale. 2016.
- "Noam Chomsky among three honorary degree recipients" (Press release). University of Guelph. February 8, 1999.
- "Noam Chomsky in Trieste". Trieste: SISSA. August 23, 2012.
- Odriozola, Patricia (April 1, 2019). "Noam Chomsky, presente en el Congreso Nacional de Filosofía" (in Spanish). Congreso Nacional de Filosofía. Archived from the original on August 8, 2019.
- "Past Honorary Degree Recipients". University of Chicago.
- "Report of the honorary degrees committee". London, Ontario: UWO. June 2000.
- "Selected Honorands". University of Cambridge. n.d.
- Sperlich, Wolfgang B. (2006). Noam Chomsky. Reaktion Books. pp. 44–45. ISBN 978-1-86189-269-0.
- "UNC entrega el "doctorado de honoris causa" a Chomsky". Río Negro (in Spanish). November 18, 2001.
- "Universidad de La Frontera condecora con Honoris Causa a Noam Chomsky". universaria Chile (in Spanish). October 18, 2006.
- "Επίτιμος Διδάκτωρ του Πανεπιστημίου Αθηνών ο καθηγητής Noam Chomsky…". Kathimerini newspaper (in Greek). April 27, 2004.
- "Επίτιμος Διδάκτωρ του Τμήματος Φιλολογίας και του Τμήματος Φιλοσοφίας – Παιδαγωγικής – Ψυχολογίας" (in Greek). Εθνικό και Καποδιστριακό Πανεπιστήμιο Αθηνών. n.d.
