= List of universities in Colombia =

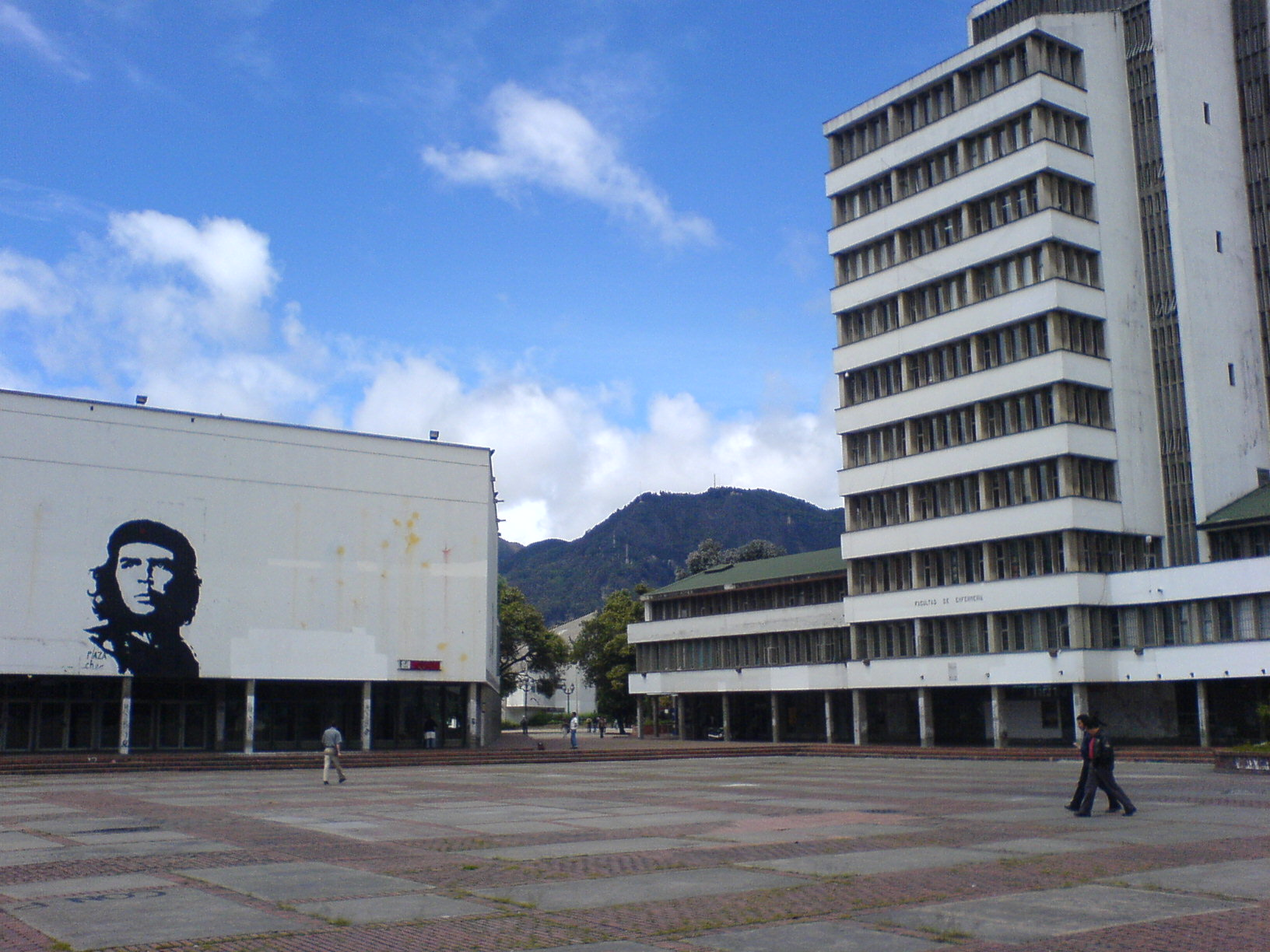
National University of Colombia: Plaza Central (a.k.a. Francisco de Paula Santander Plaza)

This is a list of universities in Colombia. The Colombian higher education system is composed of technical institutes focused on vocational education, university institutions focused on technological education, and universities focused on undergraduate and postgraduate education. The country has both public and private universities. Most public universities conform to the State University System (Spanish: Sistema Universitario Estatal, SUE), and most departments have at least one public university. Several private universities are affiliated to the Roman Catholic Church or are nonsectarian.

== Public ==
=== National ===
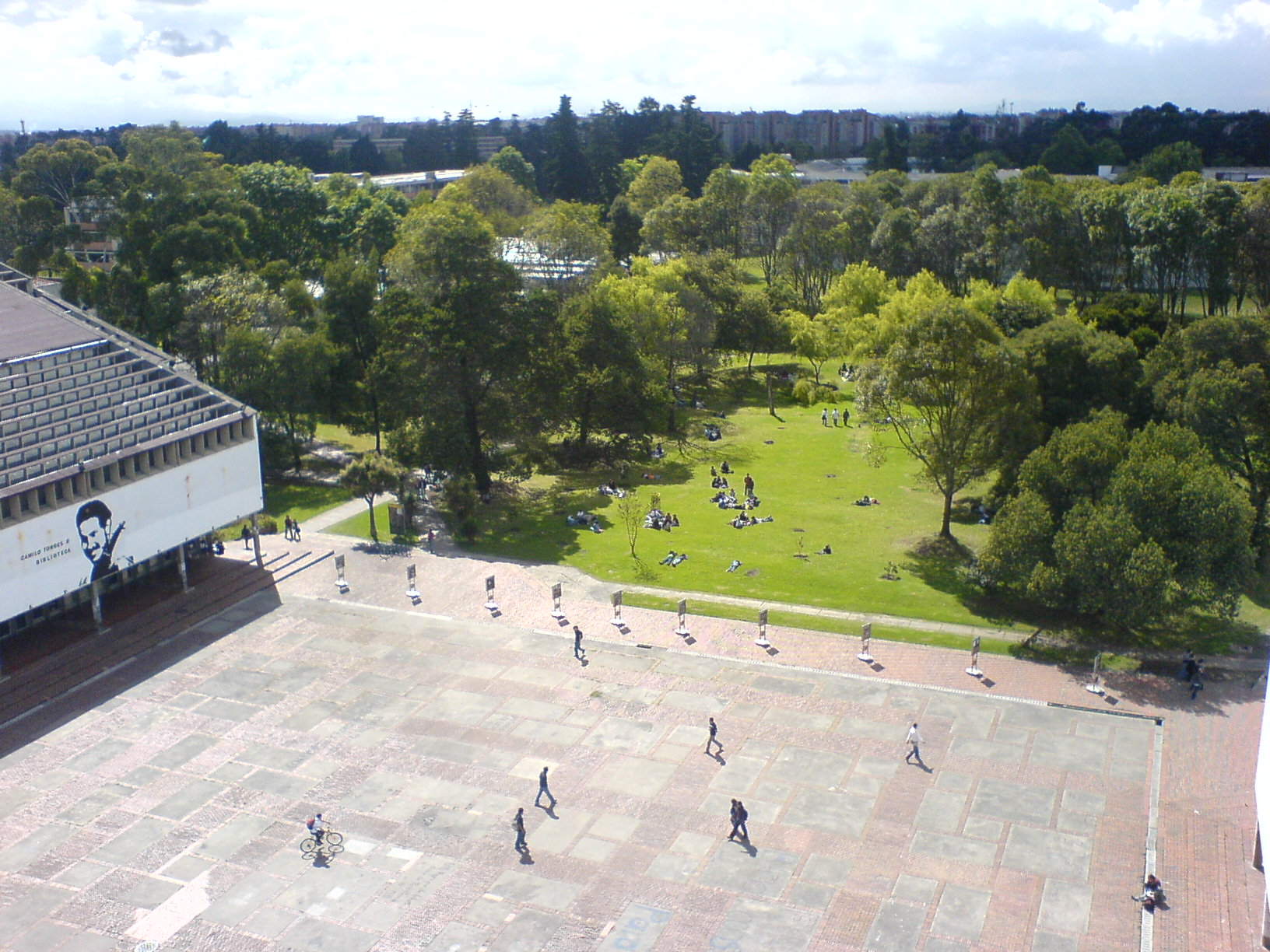
National University of Colombia

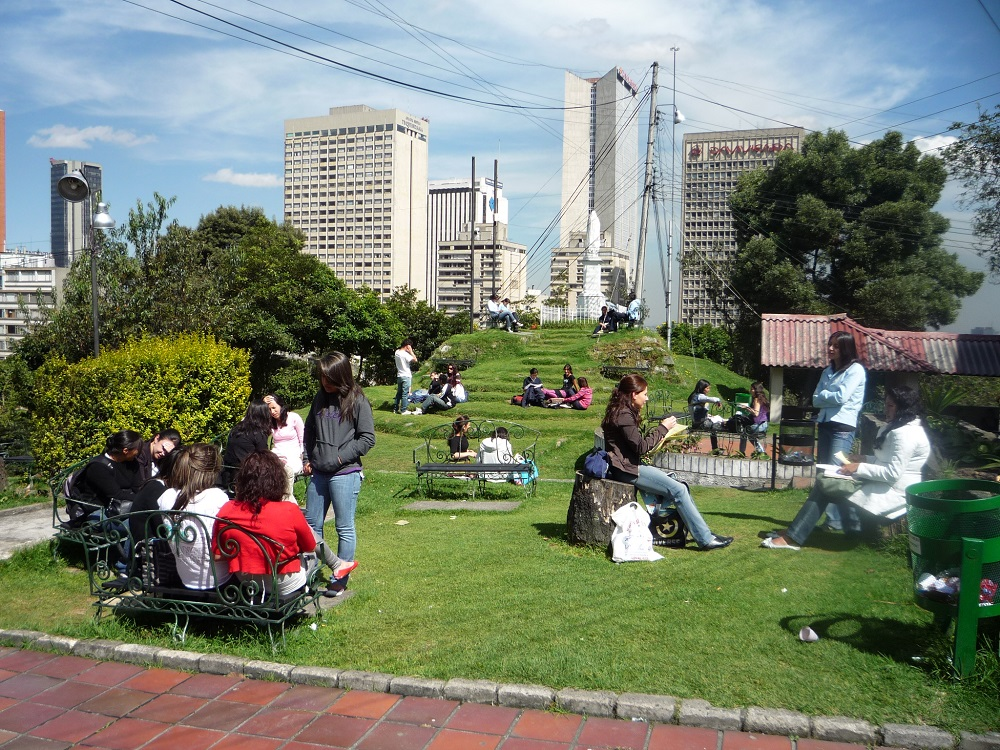
University College of Cundinamarca

Name	Established	Location	Ref.
National University of Colombia	1867	Bogotá, Medellín, Manizales, Palmira, Arauca, Leticia, Tumaco and San Andrés	
Pedagogical and Technological University of Colombia	1953	Tunja, Chiquinquirá, Duitama, Sogamoso and Bogotá	
National Pedagogic University	1955	Bogotá	
Technological University of Pereira	1958	Pereira, San Andrés, Belén de Umbría, Mistrato, Santuario, Quinchía, and Puerto Carreño	
Superior College of Public Administration	1958	Bogotá, Barranquilla, Bucaramanga, Cali, Cartagena, Cúcuta, Fusagasugá, Ibagué, Manizales, Medellín, Neiva, Pasto, Pereira, Popayán, Tunja, and Villavicencio	
University of the Amazon	1971	Florencia	
University of the Llanos	1974	Villavicencio	
National Open and Distance University	1981		
Military University Nueva Granada	1982	Bogotá	
University of the Pacific	1988	Buenaventura, Guapi, and Tumaco	
University College of Cundinamarca	1945	Bogotá	

=== Departmental ===
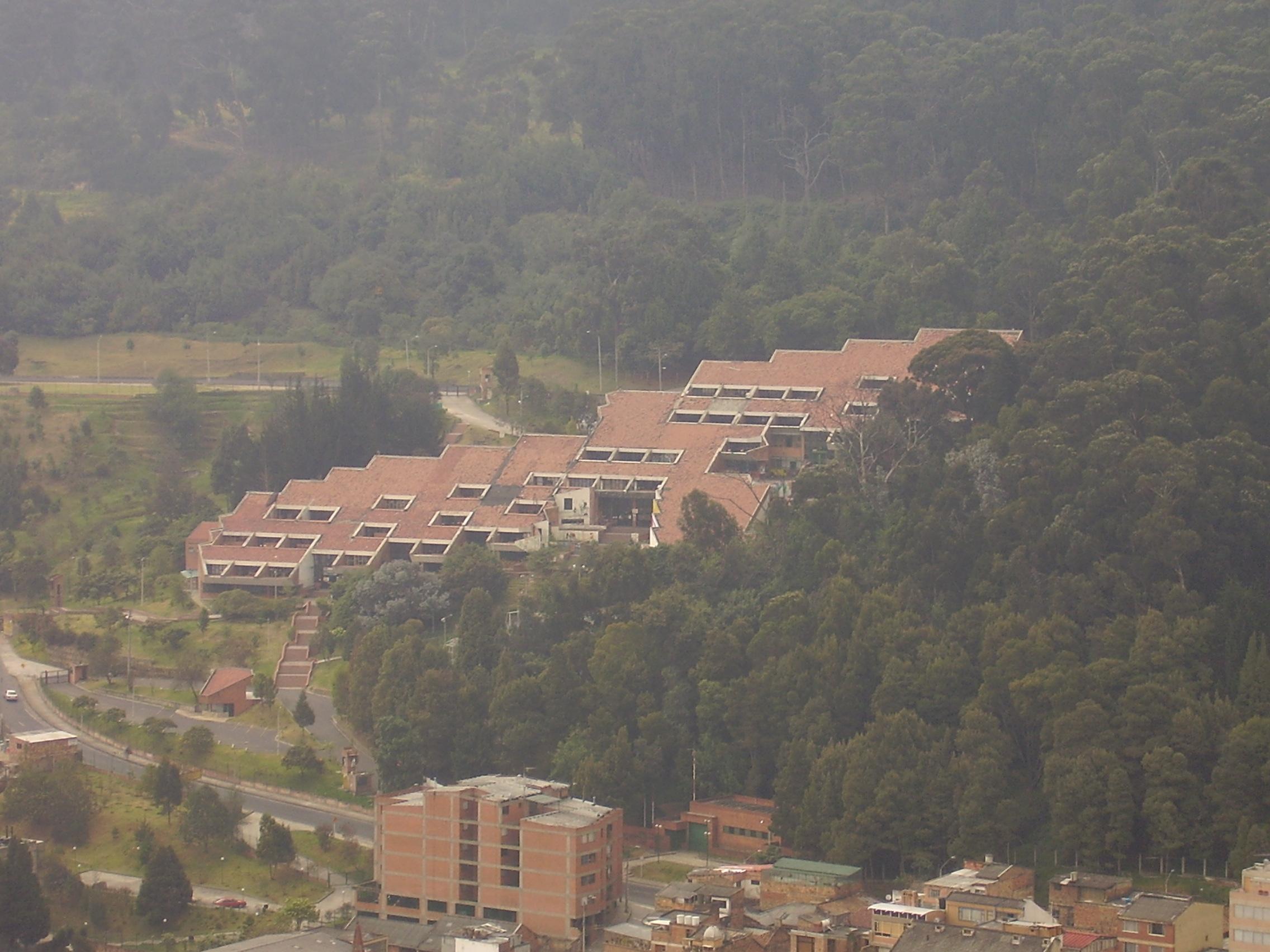
Francisco José de Caldas District University: La Macarena Campus

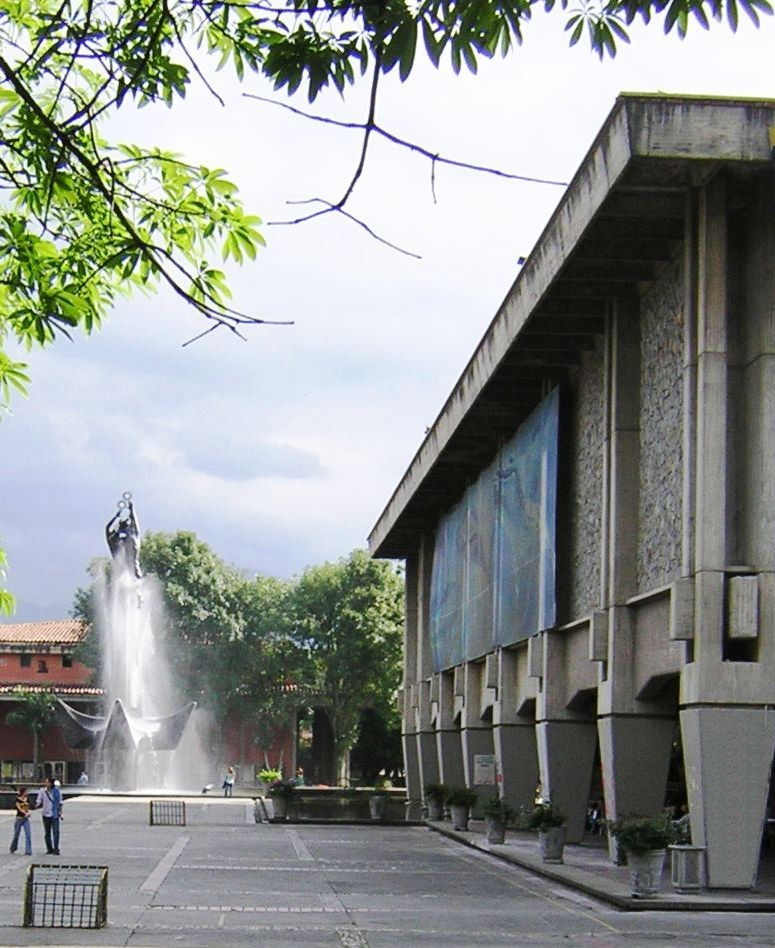
University of Antioquia: Central Library at the University City of Medellín

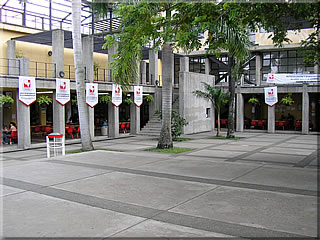
University of Valle: Faculty of Health at the San Fernando Campus

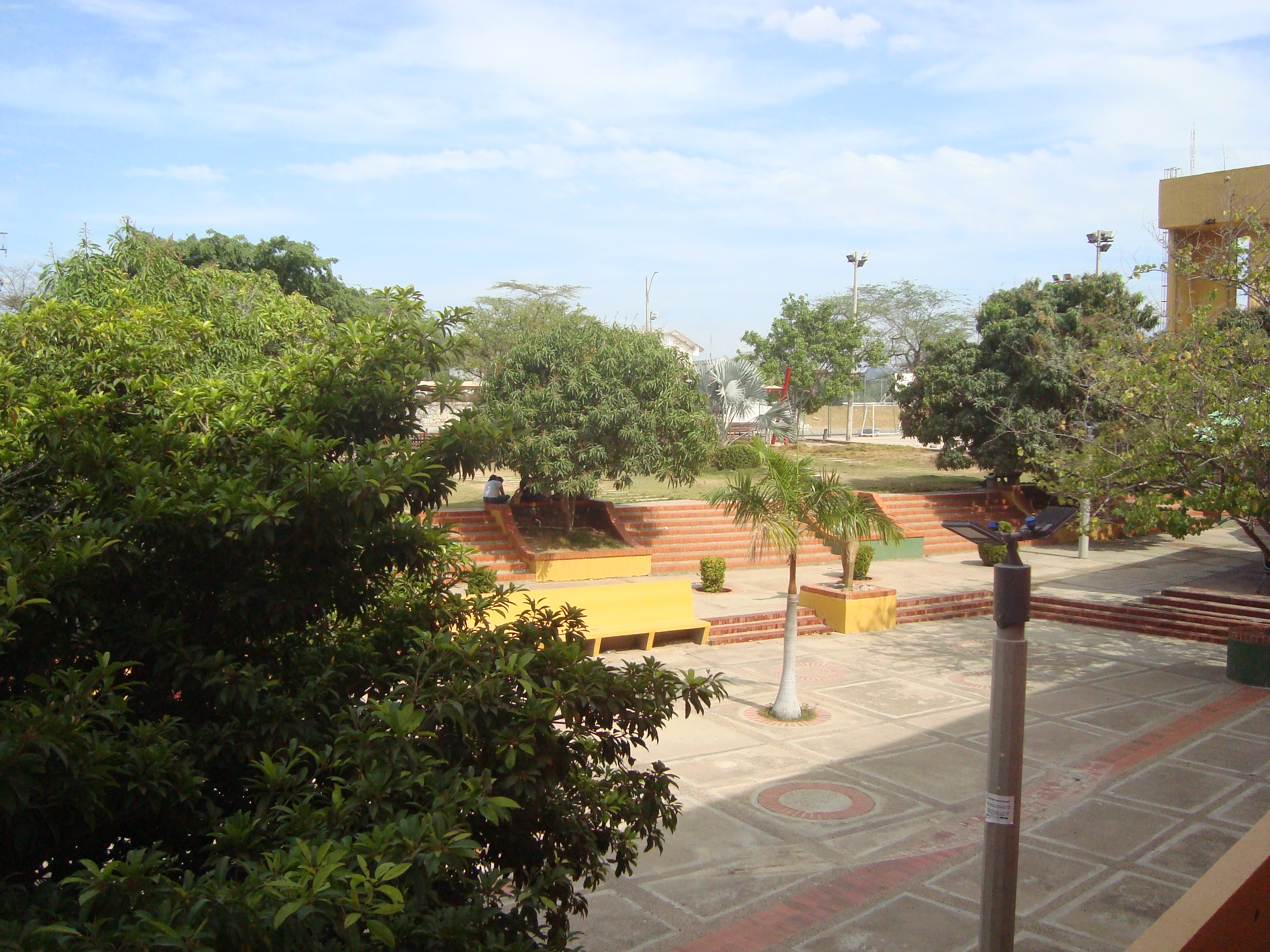
University of La Guajira, in Riohacha

Name	Established	Location	Ref.
University of Antioquia	1803	Medellín, Andes, Amalfi, Carmen de Viboral Caucasia, Envigado, Puerto Berrío, Santa Fe de Antioquia, Segovia, Turbo, and Yarumal	
University of Cartagena	1827	Cartagena	
University of Cauca	1827	Popayán	
University of Nariño	1905	Pasto, Ipiales, and Tumaco	
University of Atlantico	1941	Barranquilla, Puerto Colombia	
University of Caldas	1943	Manizales	
University of Tolima	1945	Ibagué	
University of Valle	1945	Cali, Buenaventura, Buga, Caicedonia, Cartago, Palmira, Tuluá, Yumbo, Zarzal, and Santander de Quilichao	
Francisco José de Caldas District University	1948	Bogotá	
Industrial University of Santander	1948	Bucaramanga, Barrancabermeja, Barbosa, Málaga, Piedecuesta, and Socorro	
University of Magdalena	1958	Santa Marta	
University of Pamplona	1960	Pamplona, Cúcuta, and Villa del Rosario	
University of Quindio	1960	Armenia	
Francisco de Paula Santander University	1962	Cúcuta and Ocaña	
University of Cordoba	1962	Montería	
University of Cundinamarca	1969	Fusagasugá, Chía, Chocontá, Facatativá, Girardot, Soacha, Ubaté, and Zipaquirá	
South Colombian University	1970	Neiva, Pitalito, Garzón, La Plata	
Central University of Valle del Cauca	1971	Tulua	
Technological University of Chocó	1972	Quibdó	
Popular University of Cesar	1973	Valledupar	
University of La Guajira	1977	Riohacha, Albania, Fonseca, Maicao, Manaure, Villanueva, and Montería	
University of Sucre	1977	Sincelejo	
Tecnológico de Antioquia	1983	Medellín, Abejorral, Andes, Ciudad Bolivar, Guatapé, Jericó, San Rafael, Santa Bárbara, Sonson, Urrao, Yali, Yolombó, Amalfi, Cisneros, Anorí, Hispania, Frontino, San Carlos, Belmira, Betulia, Ituango, San Andrés de Cuerquia, San Roque, Valdivia, Vagachí, Dabeiba, Fredonia, San Jerónimo, San Pedro de los Milagros, and Sopetrán.	
International University Foundation of the American Tropics	2000	Yopal	

== Private ==
=== Catholic ===
Name	Established	Location	Ref.
Saint Thomas Aquinas University	1580	Bogotá, Tunja	
Pontifical Xavierian University	1623	Bogotá, Cali	
Our Lady of the Rosary University	1653	Bogotá	
Saint Buenaventura University	1708	Bogotá, Medellín, Cali, Cartagena de Indias	
Pontifical Bolivarian University	1936	Medellín	
Catholic University of Manizales	1954	Manizales	
La Salle University	1964	Bogotá	
Catholic University of Colombia	1970	Bogotá	
Saint Martin University	1981	Bogotá and others	
Universidad Católica de Oriente	1982	Rionegro	
Catholic University of Pereira	1973	Pereira	
University Corporation Minuto de Dios	1990	Bogotá, Medellín, Cali, Cartagena de Indias and others	
Marian University	1967	Pasto	
Sergio Arboleda University	1985	Bogotá, Santa Marta	
University of La Sabana	1979	Chía	

=== Nonsectarian ===
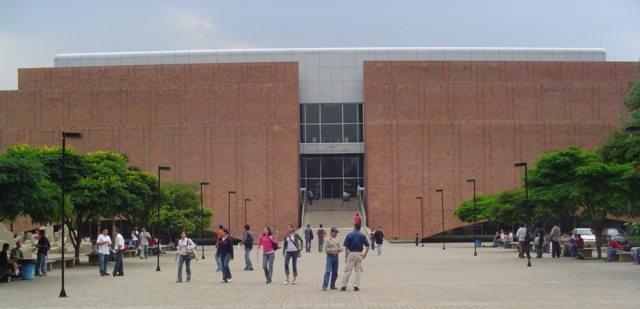
University EAFIT: Main Library

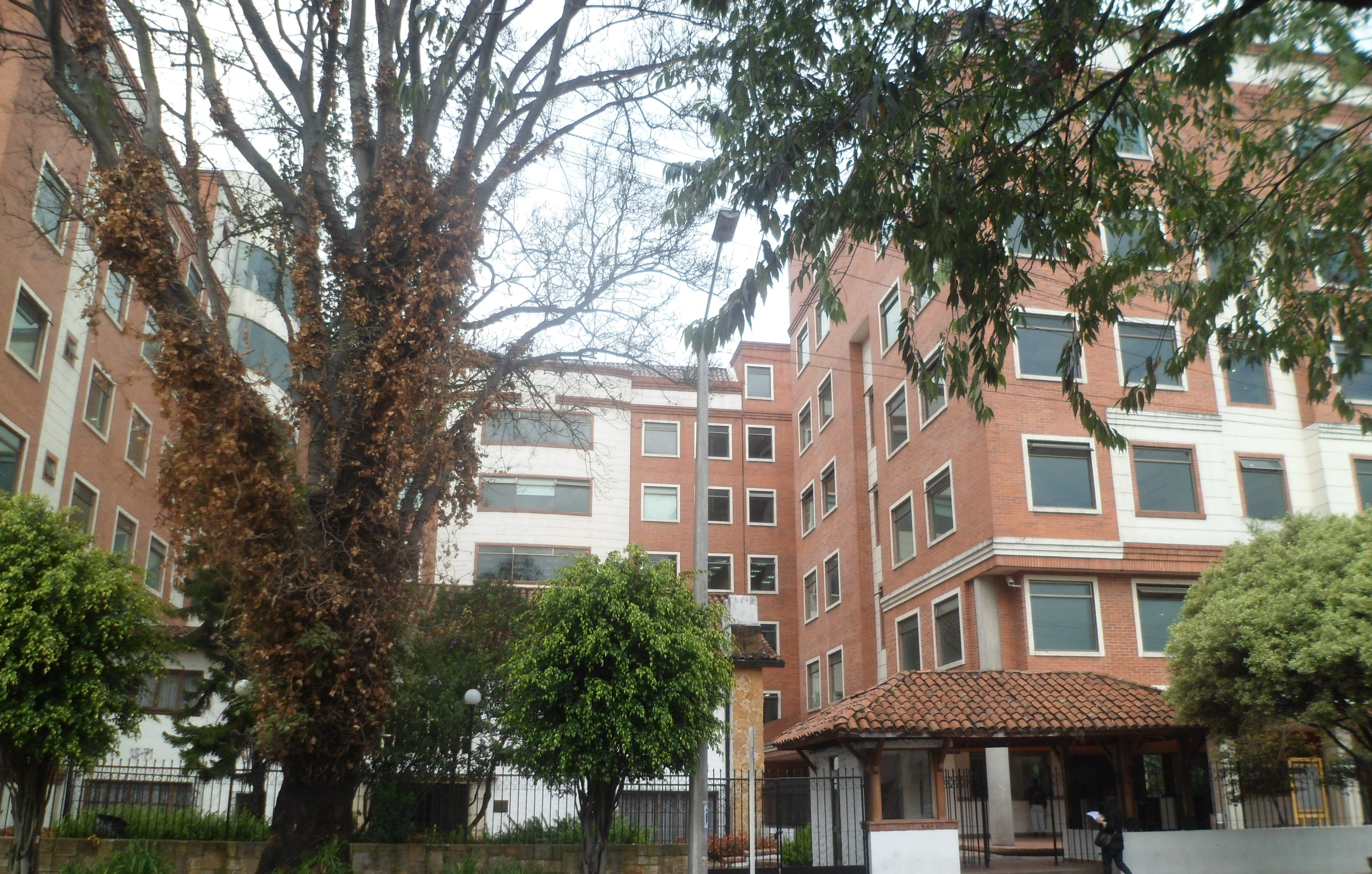
Central University Colombia: northern headquarters building

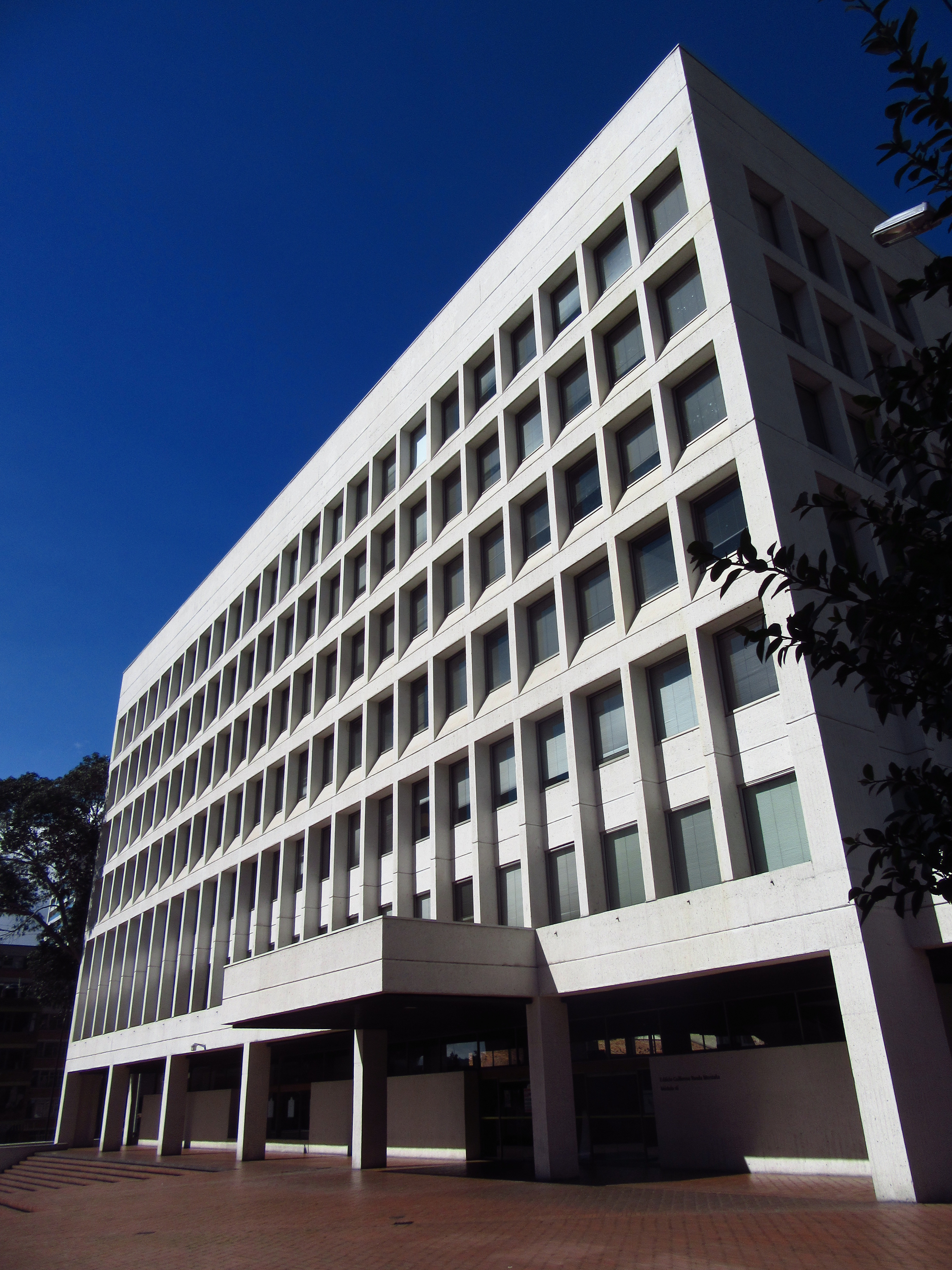
Jorge Tadeo Lozano University in Bogotá

Name	Established	Location	Ref.
Externado University of Colombia	1886	Bogotá	
Free University of Colombia	1890 (1923)	Bogotá, Cali, Barranquilla, Pereira, Cúcuta, Cartagena de Indias, Puerto Colombia and Socorro	
University of the Andes	1948	Bogotá, Cartagena de Indias	
University of Medellín	1950	Medellín	
La Gran Colombia University	1951	Bogotá, Armenia	
University of America	1952	Bogotá	
Jorge Tadeo Lozano University	1954	Bogotá, Cartagena de Indias, Santa Marta, Chía	
INCCA University of Colombia	1955	Bogotá	
Autonomous University of Bucaramanga	1956	Bucaramanga	
Santiago de Cali University	1958	Cali, Palmira	
University EAFIT	1960	Medellín	
Pilot University of Colombia	1962	Bogotá	
Cooperative University of Colombia	1964	Medellín, Bogotá, Cali, Pereira, Bucaramanga, Santa Marta, Ibagué, Popayán, Montería, Neiva, Pasto, Villavicencio, Barrancabermeja, Apartadó, Arauca, Cartago, Espinal,	
Central University	1966	Bogotá	
University of the Coast	1970	Barranquilla	
Universidad del Norte	1966	Barranquilla	
Autonomous University of the Caribbean	1967	Barranquilla	
EAN University	1967	Bogotá	
Universidad Autónoma de Occidente	1970	Cali	
Autonomous University of Colombia	1971	Bogotá	
Escuela Colombiana de Ingeniería	1972	Bogotá	
Fundación Universitaria INPAHU	1974	Bogotá	
Universidad Antonio Nariño	1976	Bogotá, Medellín, Cali, Cartagena de Indias, Armenia, Santa Marta, Puerto Colombia	
Universidad El Bosque	1977	Bogotá	
Autonomous University of Manizales	1979	Manizales	
University of Boyacá	1979	Tunja, Sogamoso and Yopal	
University ICESI	1979	Cali	
University of Ibagué	1980	Ibague	
Politécnico Grancolombiano	1981	Bogotá, Medellín	
University Foundation of the Andes Area	1983	Bogotá, Medellín, Pereira, Valledupar	
University of Santander UDES	1996	Bucaramanga, Bogotá, Cúcuta, Valledupar	
Cooperative University of San Gil	1988	San Gil, Yopal	
FESC University	1995	Cúcuta, Ocaña	
Simón Bolívar University	1972	Barranquilla, Cúcuta	
University of Manizales	1972	Manizales	

== See also ==
- List of universities in Bogotá
- Lists of universities and colleges
- Lists of universities and colleges by country
- Pontifical university
