= Central University of Valle del Cauca =

University in Columbia

Central Unit of Valle del Cauca
- Unidad Central del Valle del Cauca
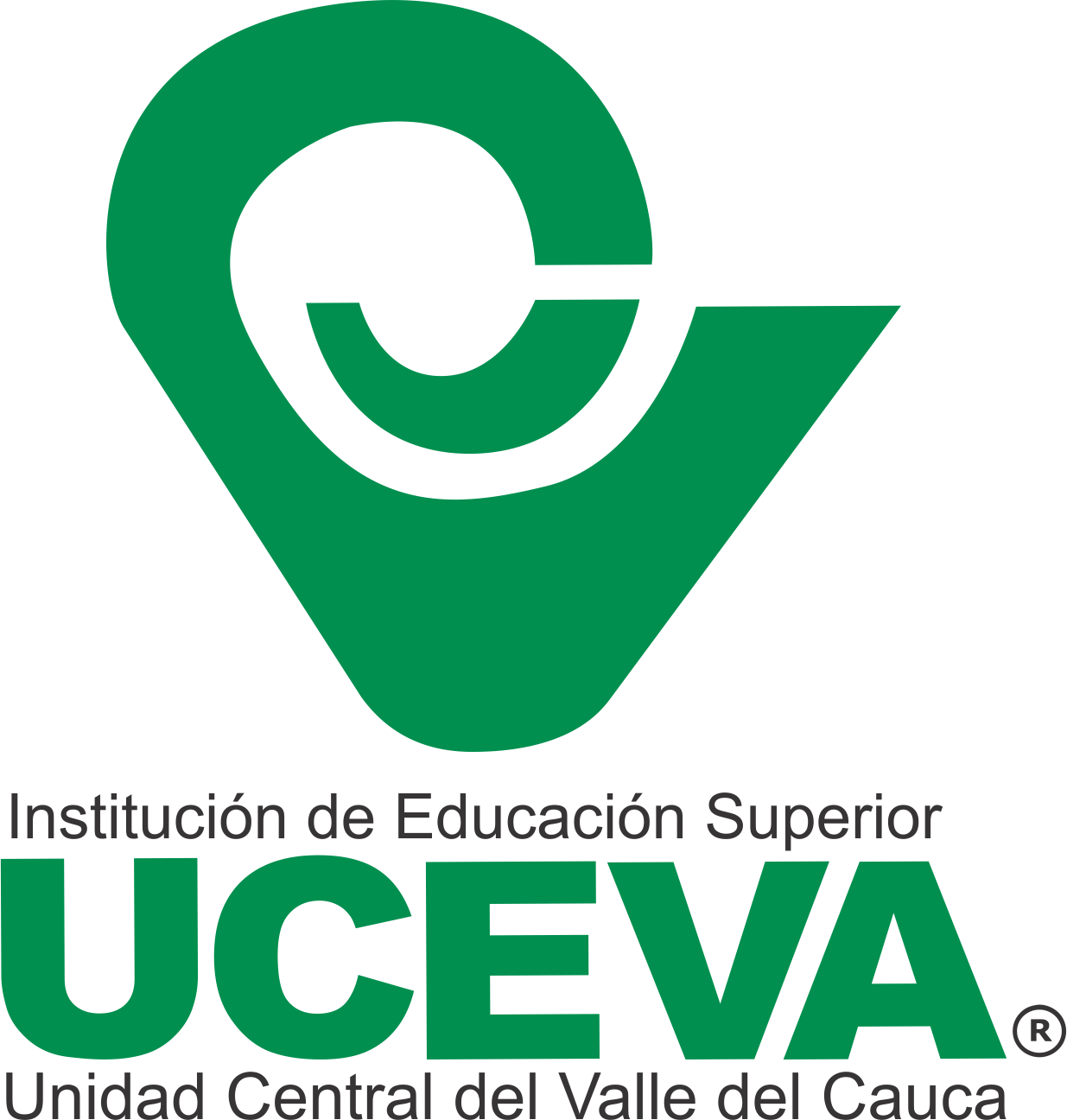
- Other names: UCEVA
- Type: Public
- Established: June 24, 1971
- Location: Tuluá, Valle del Cauca, Colombia
- Website: www.uceva.edu.co

The Central Unit of Valle del Cauca (Spanish: Unidad Central del Valle del Cauca), also called UCEVA, is a public, departmental university based in the city of Tuluá, Valle del Cauca, Colombia.

== See also ==
- List of universities in Colombia
