= Iota Phi Theta =

International historically African American collegiate fraternity

- ΙΦΘ
- Founded: September 19, 1963; 63 years ago Morgan State College (now Morgan State University)
- Type: Social
- Affiliation: NPHC; NIC
- Status: Active
- Emphasis: African American
- Scope: International
- Motto: "Building A Tradition, Not Resting Upon One!"
- Pillars: Scholarship, Leadership, Citizenship, Fidelity, and Brotherhood
- Colors: Charcoal Brown; Gilded Gold
- Flower: Rose
- Mascot: Centaur
- Chapters: 300+
- Members: 75,000 active 75,000+ lifetime
- Nickname: Iotas, Centaurs, Outlaws, Thetaman
- Headquarters: Founders Hall; 1600 North Calvert Street; Baltimore, Maryland 21202; United States
- Website: www.iotaphitheta.org

Iota Phi Theta Fraternity, Inc. (ΙΦΘ) is a historically African American fraternity. It was founded on September 19, 1963, at Morgan State University (then Morgan State College) in Baltimore, Maryland, and is the fifth largest Black Greek Lettered Fraternity. There are over 301 undergraduate and alumni chapters (including colonies).

The fraternity is a member of the National Pan-Hellenic Council (NPHC), an umbrella organization commonly referred to as the Divine 9 which is composed of international, historically African American Greek letter sororities and fraternities. It is also a member of the North American Interfraternity Conference (NIC).

== History ==
The fraternity was founded by Albert Hicks, Lonnie Spruill, Jr., Charles Briscoe, Frank Coakley, John Slade, Barron Willis, Webster Lewis, Charles Brown, Lewis Hudnell, Charles Gregory, Elias Dorsey, Jr., and Michael Williams. on September 19, 1963. They were all dedicated to the civil rights movement and were all non-traditional students.

=== Early activism – Northwood Theater ===
While the 1950s was an era of conformity, the 1960s was an era of resistance. In the 60s many African Americans began forming organizations based on their passion for social change and their alignment with the principles of the Civil Rights Movement. The fraternity was among these groups. Brothers participated in various protests and sit-ins throughout Baltimore to fight racial segregation. The earliest was a protest organized by a civic interest group, composed mostly of Morgan State College students, against the theater at Northwood Shopping Center in Baltimore, Maryland, located diagonally across the street from Morgan State College. Northwood continued to segregate its services, affecting thousands of students at the historically black college. In many theaters, only white people could occupy seating on the main floor, while black people were restricted to the segregated Jim Crow balcony, often with a separate ticket booth and entrance.

This protest started on February 15, 1963, and over six days, the total number of picketers involved reached 1500, and over 400 individuals were arrested. The protest took place in the context of a longer history of protests against the theater's white-only policy. Annual demonstrations against the theater had been held since 1955, including a sit-in at Northwood and picketing downtown. The theater was the last holdout of racial segregation in the blocks surrounding the college. On February 22, 1963, the theater capitulated to student demands and ended its white-only policy. It was during this time that future Iota men decidedly became advocates for marginalized people and their communities.

=== Incorporation, philanthropy, and growth ===
The fraternity functioned as a local entity until the first interest groups were established in 1967 at Hampton Institute (Beta chapter) and Delaware State College (Gamma chapter). Further expansion took place in 1968, with chapters formed at Norfolk State College (Delta chapter) and Jersey City State College (Epsilon chapter). The fraternity was legally incorporated on November 1, 1968, as a national fraternity under the laws of the State of Maryland. Zeta chapter (North Carolina A&T State University) was founded in spring 1969.

1963 was a defining year in the United States. President John F. Kennedy was assassinated in Dallas, Texas; civil rights protests continued throughout the South, during which nonviolent activists were frequently met with beatings and arrests; 4 young girls were killed during the 16th Street Baptist Church bombing; over 200,000 people marched on Washington in support of civil rights; Kenya gained its independence; Medger Evers, NAACP field secretary, and civil rights leader was assassinated at his home in Jackson, Mississippi by a segregationist; Unemployment reached 6.1 percent, etc.

Throughout the 1960s and 1970s, the fraternity supported local social service programs including the Big Brothers of America. In 1974, the then Grand Polaris, Thomas Dean, appeared in a local television commercial on behalf of Big Brothers of America. The fraternity continues to support service initiatives with national organizations such as the NAACP, the United Negro College Fund, the National Sickle Cell Disease Foundation, St. Jude Children's Research Hospital, the American Red Cross, the Southern Christian Leadership Conference, the National Institutes of Health All of Us (initiative), the National Federation of the Blind, the Inroads (organization) and the United States Army. Additionally the fraternity’s chapters continue to support and lead Iota’s initiatives: I-S.H.I.E.L.D, the I.O.T.A. (“Intelligent, Outstanding Talented Achievers”) Youth Alliance, the Iota Phi Theta Men’s Health Program, I-PhiT ("Impact Others Through Awareness by Implementing Public Health Initiatives Throughout the World"), the #MuchMoreThanAHashtag Program and Project IMAGE.

Originally, the organization’s members had no aspiration of national or international recognition. The first steps toward moving the fraternity from a regional to a national scope were taken with the creation of the Upsilon chapter at Southern Illinois University in 1974. It was also during this period that the fraternity's first four graduate chapters were formed across the South and the East Coast, which created a base for the organization in the Northeast, Southeast, Mid-Atlantic, and Midwest regions of the country. The next regional expansion occurred in 1983 with the establishment of the Alpha Chi (San Francisco State University) and Xi Omega (San Francisco Bay Area Alumni Chapter) in California.

=== Joining the NIC and NPHC ===
While eventually joining the National Pan-Hellenic Council (NPHC) was an important objective for some members, it was not an objective for the fraternity as a whole. The fraternity prioritized entering an affiliation that would provide resources and relationships essential for Iota's long-term growth and development. With that in mind, Iota Phi Theta successfully petitioned for membership in the North American Interfraternity Conference (NIC; a federation of 69 North American men's fraternities) in 1985. Iota Phi Theta became the second historically African American fraternity to join the NIC and remains one of only four historically African American fraternities which are NIC members.

While its NIC membership was and is beneficial, later Iota began contact with the NPHC, which at the time had no expansion policy with which to accept new members. At its 1993 national convention, the NPHC adopted a constitutional amendment that provided for expansion, and years later, an NPHC expansion committee developed criteria for potential new member organizations and a procedure by which they might apply.

In 1996, Iota Phi Theta submitted a formal application to the NPHC expansion committee for review, after which it was delivered to the NPHC Executive Board. After deliberation, the board unanimously approved Iota Phi Theta's membership application. Effective November 12, 1996, Iota Phi Theta was accepted as a full member of the National Pan-Hellenic Council, with all its rights, privileges, and responsibilities. To commemorate Iota's entry, the NPHC conducted a formal induction ceremony at its February 1997 leadership conference. This ceremony was attended by hundreds of Iota men, including the Grand Council and a number of the fraternity's founders, as well as hundreds of well-wishers and supporters from the NPHC community.

=== 1990s to 2000s and international expansion ===
In 1992, the fraternity established the National Iota Foundation, Inc., a tax-exempt entity that grants scholarships and other financial assistance to those in need. Since its creation, the foundation has distributed over $250,000 in programs and services.

The fraternity became an international entity with the establishment of a colony in Nassau, Bahamas in 1999, military chapters in South Korea (Alpha Rho Omega, 2005) and Japan (Beta Pi Omega, 2009), and Theta Mu (The Diego Luis Cordoba Tech University of Choco; Quibdó, Chocó, Colombia, South America, 2013). Fraternity leaders, strategists, and alumni chapters created networking channels to ensure their members were afforded opportunities previously reserved for members of older, larger organizations only. The internal processes are catalysts for gaining access and influence in business, politics, higher education, entertainment, healthcare, law, etc. Qualifying based on several years of existence, Iota Phi Theta has grown at a faster pace than all other Black Greek Letter Fraternities. As of June 2018, there have been over 30,000 members initiated in the US and overseas.

In 2012, Iota Phi Theta was ranked No. 20 on Newsweek's "Top 25 Fraternities" list. September 19, 2013 marked the fraternity's 50th anniversary. After the fraternity’s 50th anniversary, fraternity members aligned themselves with the Black Lives Matter (BLM) Movement. The fraternity and BLM maintain similar stances that societal inequalities and injustices must permanently end across the United States. In 2016, the Alpha and Gamma Omega Omega chapters, both located in Baltimore, MD, pledged an endowment of $100,000 to Morgan State University’s Scholarship Fund. The fraternity gifted $100,000 to the National Museum of African American History. The fraternity also donated official vintage merchandise to the museum, which opened on September 24, 2016. In 2020, the Beta Omega Washington, DC Alumni Chapter (in conjunction with Beta Omega Social Services) awarded $55,000 in scholarship funds to high-achieving (many underprivileged) college-bound youth.

In May 2020, Iota's president and other NPHC fraternities and sororities' presidents formally called for the filing of criminal charges against police officers involved in the murder of George Floyd. On May 29, Iota's leadership and other NPHC organizations' leadership accepted an invitation to begin a series of meetings with then-presidential candidate Joe Biden regarding the highest priorities facing Black America. Also in 2020, Brother and Congressman Bobby Rush successfully passed the Emmett Till Antilynching Act (a bill he introduced in 2019) to the United States House of Representatives. The act was eventually signed into law on March 29, 2022, and remains a landmark achievement.

== Symbols ==
The fraternity's motto is "Building A Tradition, Not Resting Upon One!" Its pillars are Scholarship, Leadership, Citizenship, Fidelity, and Brotherhood. Its colors are charcoal brown and gilded gold. Its mascot is the centaur. Its flower is the yellow rose. Its nicknames are Iotas, Centaurs, Outlaws, and Thetaman.

== Activities ==
Iota Phi Theta has a publication and several affiliated programs. The Centaur magazine is the official publication of the Iota Phi Theta Fraternity, Inc. First published as a newsletter, the Centaur is now published biannually.

== Governance ==
Iota Phi Theta is led by a grand council with a Grand Polaris at its head.

== Chapters ==
The fraternity has established chapters in the United States, The Bahamas, Colombia, Japan, and South Korea. All active collegiate chapters are now located in the United States. As of 2024, it has more than 300 chapters.

== Notable members ==
As of 2024, Iota Phi Theta had initiated more than 75,000 members.

== See also ==
- List of social fraternities
- Cultural interest fraternities and sororities
