= University of Tolima =

- Universidad del Tolima
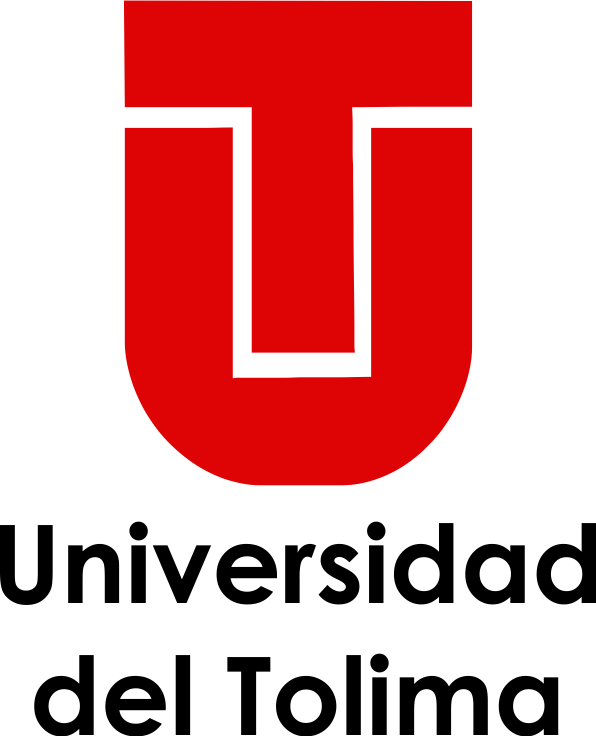
- Type: Public, National
- Established: May 21, 1945
- Affiliations: ICETEX, Universia, ASCUN
- Rector: Dr. Omar Mejia
- Students: 35,000 approx. Remote and onsite
- Location: Ibagué, Tolima, Colombia
- Campus: 67.60 acres, Urban
- Colours: Red, Green y White
- Website: http://www.ut.edu.co/

The Universidad del Tolima-UT is a faculty of higher education located in the Colombian city of Ibague, capital of the department of Tolima. It is a public autonomous institution departmental order created by Ordinance No. 005 of 1945, with legal, academic, administrative and financial autonomy and independent heritage that develops and manages its budget in accordance with the functions accordingly. In regard to policy and planning in the education sector it is under the Ministry of National Education Colombia. In the national rankings University of Tolima is one of the largest in the country (35,000) and one of the students in academic and research best quality in the long list of public college's remarkable career, and one of the top -level general. Universidad del Tolima-UT holds Colombian National Education Ministry Quality Accreditation.

It offers a wide range of academic, a modality has 23 undergraduate academic programs 3 technologies, 14 majors, 12 master's, one doctorate and distance mode offers 11 undergraduate degree programs, graduate 3, 4 technologies, 4 professional technicians, many of these programs are recognized for their high quality accreditation.

== See also ==
- List of universities in Colombia
