= University of the Amazon =

Public university in Florencia, Colombia

- Universidad de la Amazonía
- Former names: South Colombian University Technological Institute, Florencia (1971–1982)
- Type: Public university
- Established: 1982
- Location: Florencia, Caquetá, Colombia; 1.619816°N 75.604029°W
- Website: uniamazonia.edu.co

The University of the Amazon (Spanish: Universidad de la Amazonia), also called Uniamazonía, is a national public university in Florencia, Caquetá, Colombia. The university is established by Act 60 of 1982 to contribute to the development of the Amazon region.

== See also ==
- List of universities in Colombia
