= University of the Llanos =

Public university in Villavicencio, Colombia

- Universidad de los Llanos
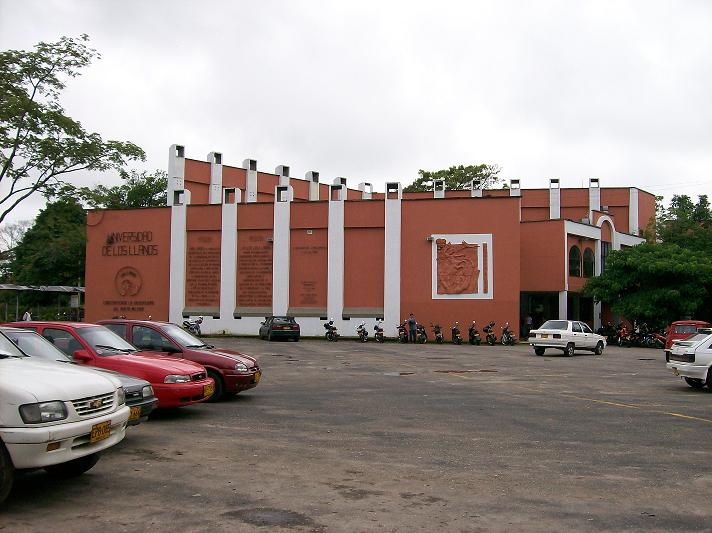
- Motto: Compromiso con la paz y el desarrollo regional
- Motto in English: Commitment to peace and regional development
- Type: Public university
- Established: November 25, 1974
- Rector: Pablo Emilio Cruz Casallas
- Students: 5990 (2018)
- Location: Villavicencio, Meta, Colombia; 4°4′30″N 73°35′7″W
- Website: unillanos.edu.co

The University of the Llanos (Spanish: Universidad de los Llanos), also known as Unillanos, is a national public university based in the city of Villavicencio, Meta, Colombia.

== See also ==
- List of universities in Colombia
