= University of Cundinamarca =

Public university in Cundinamarca, Colombia

- Universidad de Cundinamarca
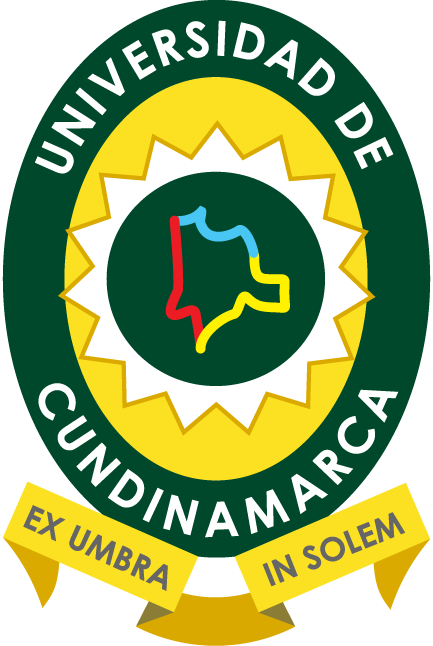
- Former names: University Institute of Cundinamarca (1969 - 1992)
- Motto: Ex umbra in solem
- Motto in English: From the shadows to the light
- Type: Public, departmental
- Established: December 19, 1969
- Endowment: $28.6 million (2021)
- Academic staff: 1073 (fall 2018)
- Administrative staff: 1,000
- Students: 13,234 (fall 2018)
- Undergraduates: 13,121 (fall 2016)
- Postgraduates: 360 (fall 2016)
- Location: Fusagasugá, Cundinamarca, Colombia
- Website: http://www.unicundi.edu.co/

The University of Cundinamarca (Spanish: Universidad de Cundinamarca), is a public, departmental university located primarily in the city of Fusagasugá in Cundinamarca, Colombia. The university has satellite campuses across the department in the cities of Chía, Chocontá, Facatativá, Girardot, Soacha, Ubaté, and Zipaquirá.

== History ==
The main campus of the University of Cundinamarca was established in the early 1970s in the city of Fusagasugá, in the Sumapaz Province of Cundinamarca. The institution originated through Ordinance No. 045 of December 19, 1969, which created the Instituto Técnico Universitario de Cundinamarca (ITUC). According to the ordinance, the ITUC was to provide higher education to individuals holding a secondary school or teaching diploma, giving priority—up to 90%—to students from the Department of Cundinamarca.

Academic activities began on August 1, 1970, at the Fusagasugá campus with three initial programs: Agricultural Technology, Administrative Technology, and Executive Secretarial Studies. In 1990, the ITUC applied to become a full university. This recognition was granted by Resolution No. 19530 of December 30, 1992, issued by the Ministry of National Education, formally integrating the institution into the State University System (Sistema Universitario Estatal, SUE).

In 2007, artist and designer Pedro Enrique Espitia Zambrano developed the university’s visual identity, including its logo, slogan, flag, and other symbolic elements.

As of 2022, the rector of the university was Adriano Muñoz Barrera. In 2016, the institution employed 714 teaching staff, including 366 with master’s degrees and 23 with doctorates. Of these, 232 held full-time appointments. In total, 916 teaching contracts were issued that year.

As of 2025, Adriano Muñoz Barrera remained in office as rector. However, his re-election was marred by controversy. Reports allege that the University Council convened an extraordinary session during a non-academic vacation period, without the participation of the presidential and departmental delegates. According to these accounts, invitations were sent late at night, just hours before the session was held the following day.

== See also ==
- List of universities in Colombia
