= University of Quindío =

Public university in Armenia, Quindío, Colombia

Coordinates: 4°33′18″N 75°39′35″W

- Universidad del Quindío
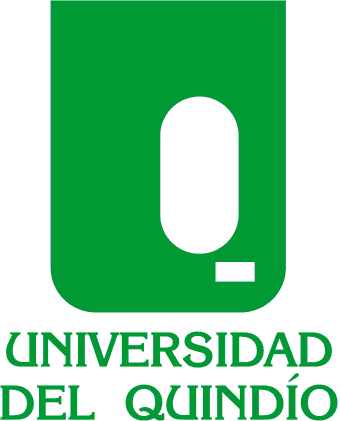
- Motto: Desafíos, sueños y compromisos
- Motto in English: Challenges, dreams and commitments
- Type: Public
- Established: October 14, 1960
- Students: 16565
- Undergraduates: 16245
- Postgraduates: 320
- Location: Armenia, Quindío, Colombia
- Website: http://www.uniquindio.edu.co/

The University of Quindío (Spanish: Universidad del Quindío), is a public institution and department in Colombia, under the Ministry of Education; Its headquarters are located in Armenia, Quindío, Colombia.

It has 32 undergraduate academic programs and 16 postgraduate. It has 31 research groups, 14 of them categorized and recognized by Colciencias: 2 Category A, 4 Category B and 8 in class C.

== History ==
University of Quindío was founded in 1960 and became an institution of departmental status in 1982. Begins operations in 1962 with the programs of Agronomy and Topography (Surveying). Currently the University has 7 faculties in the areas of: Humanities Sciences, Health Sciences, Engineering, Economics and Administrative Sciences, Education, Basic Sciences and Technology, Science in Agribusiness and distance learning modalities.

The University has 12,000 students including postgraduate students. Its faculty is formed by 854 teachers, 24 of whom are doctoral, 233 masters and 239 specializations.

== Academic Offer ==
The University of Quindío has 7 faculties (schools) which offer the following courses at the undergraduate, postgraduate and diplomaed.

=== Undergraduate ===
Faculty of Engineering

- Civil engineering
- Electronic Engineering
- Systems Engineering
- Geomatics/Surveying Technology

Faculty of Agribusiness

- Professionalism in Agricultural Business Management
- Food Engineering
- Agricultural Technology
- Agroindustrial technology
- Chemical Technology of Plant Products

Faculty of Basic Sciences and Technology

- Chemistry
- Biology
- Physics
- Mathematics
- Electronics Technology

Faculty of Humanities sciences

- Philosophy
- Gerontology
- Social Communication and Journalism
- Social work
- Science of Information and Documentation

Faculty of Economics and Administrative Sciences

- Public Accounting
- Financial (distance)
- Business Administration
- Economics

Faculty of Health Sciences

- Medicine
- Nursing
- Occupational health

Faculty of Education Sciences

- Modern Languages with emphasis on English and French degree
- Natural Sciences and Environmental Education degree
- Literature and Castilian Language degree
- Physical Education and Sports degree
- Mathematics degree

=== Postgraduate ===
Specialization

- Specializing in investment portfolios and company valuations
- Specialization in Logistics Engineering
- Specialization in International Business and Finance
- Specialization in Tax Management
- Specialization in Tax Auditing and External Auditing
- Specialization in Occupational Health and Occupational Health
- Specialization in Environmental Education
- Specializing in Radio

Master

- Master of Biomedical Sciences
- Master of Materials Science
- Master of Science in Education
- Master of Biomathematics
- Master in Biology
- Master in Chemistry

Doctorate

- PhD in Education
- Biomedical Sciences

Diplomaed

- Diplomaed in Web Site Development
- Diplomaed in Family Intervention
- Diplomaed in Social Research
- Diplomaed in Philosophy and Education
- Diplomaed in New Internal Control Standard Model for State Entities MECI 1000: 2005
- Diplomaed in International Standards of Accounting and Auditing
- Diplomaed in Molecular Biology and Biotechnology
- Diplomaed in Teaching
- Diplomaed in English
- Diplomaed in Neuropsicopedagogía
- Diplomaed in Virtual Environments for Teaching and Learning
- Diplomaed in Treatment and Wastewater Recycling.

== See also ==
- List of universities in Colombia
