= Popular University of Cesar =

University in Colombia

- Universidad Popular del Cesar
- Former names: Technological Institute of Cesar (1973 - 1993)
- Motto: Educación y Futuro
- Motto in English: Education and Future
- Type: Public
- Established: 1973
- Rector: José Guillermo Botero Cotes
- Location: Valledupar, Cesar, Colombia
- Website: http://www.unicesar.edu.co/
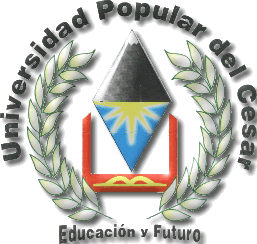

The Popular University of Cesar (Spanish: Universidad Popular del Cesar), is a public, departmental university based primarily in the city of Valledupar, Cesar, Colombia.

== See also ==
- List of universities in Colombia
