= National University of Lanús =

Argentine university

Coordinates: 34°44′03″S 58°23′26″W

- Universidad Nacional de Lanús
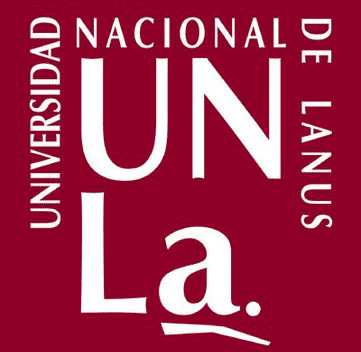
- Type: Public
- Established: 1995
- Faculty: 222
- Students: 18.000
- Location: Lanús, Buenos Aires, Argentina
- Website: http://www.unla.edu.ar/

The National University of Lanús (Spanish: Universidad Nacional de Lanús, UNLa) is an Argentine national university, located in Remedios de Escalada, Lanús Partido, Buenos Aires Province.

It was created on June 7, 1995 by national law 24,496.

== History ==
The university was created on June 7, 1995 by national law 24,496. It first operated in La Habana 568, Valentín Alsina, in a building loaned by the Federation of Meat.

On 1996, 10 hectares (25 acres) of land that used to belong to the Roca Railway (at that moment, under FEMESA control) were transferred to the University with the 24,750 and 24,751 national laws.

In 2003, national law 25,766 granted the university a 19,031 square metres (204,850 sq ft) building, which at that moment housed the Ferrocarriles Argentinos archives.

== See also ==
- Science and Education in Argentina
- Argentine Higher Education Official Site
- Argentine Universities
