= University of Atlántico =

Public university in Barranquilla, Atlántico, Colombia

- Universidad del Atlántico
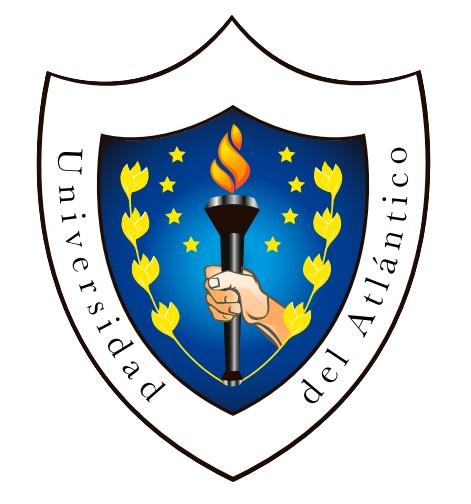
- Former names: Institute of Technology of Atlántico (1941–1946)
- Type: Public
- Established: 1941
- Affiliations: ASCUN
- Rector: Danilo Hernández
- Academic staff: 656
- Students: 24,113
- Location: Barranquilla, Atlántico, Colombia
- Campus: North, 150,000 m^{2} (37 acres) Fine Arts, 12,920 m^{2} (3.19 acres) Downtown, 12,557 m^{2} (3.103 acres) Urban Sabanalarga, Suán Rural
- Nickname: Uniatlántico
- Website: http://www.uniatlantico.edu.co/

The University of Atlántico (Spanish: Universidad del Atlántico), also called Uniatlántico, is a public, departmental, coeducational, research university based in the city of Barranquilla, Atlántico, Colombia. It is the largest higher education institution by student population in the Colombian Caribbean region with 24,113 students, and a faculty of 656 full-time equivalent professors. The university was established by the ordinance No. 24 of 1941 as the Institute of Technology of Atlántico (Spanish: Instituto de Tecnología del Atlántico), under the tutelage of philosopher Julio Enrique Blanco. Then, it changed its name to the present by Ordinance No. 42 of June 15, 1946.

== Campus ==
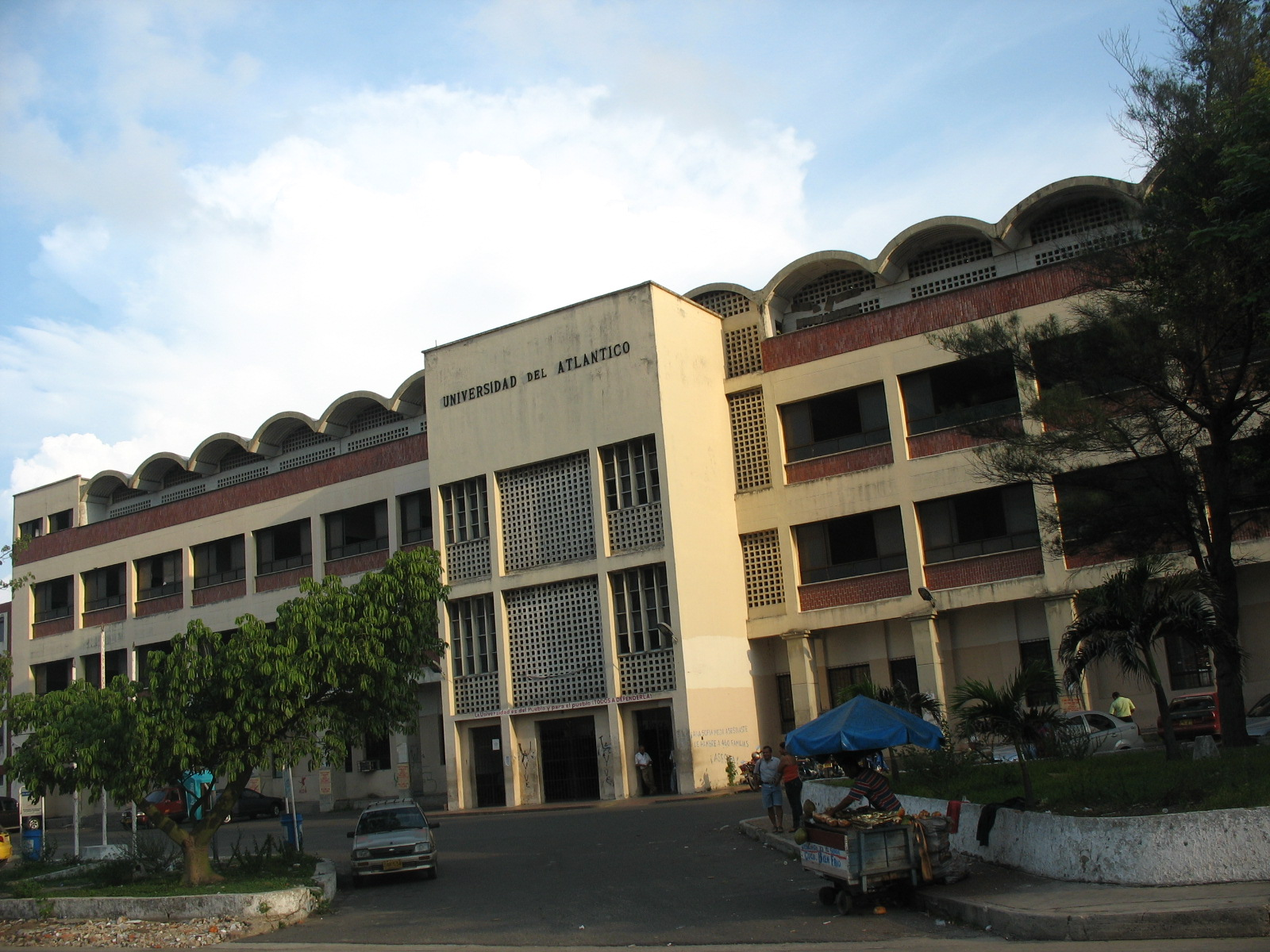
Downtown Site, University of Atlántico

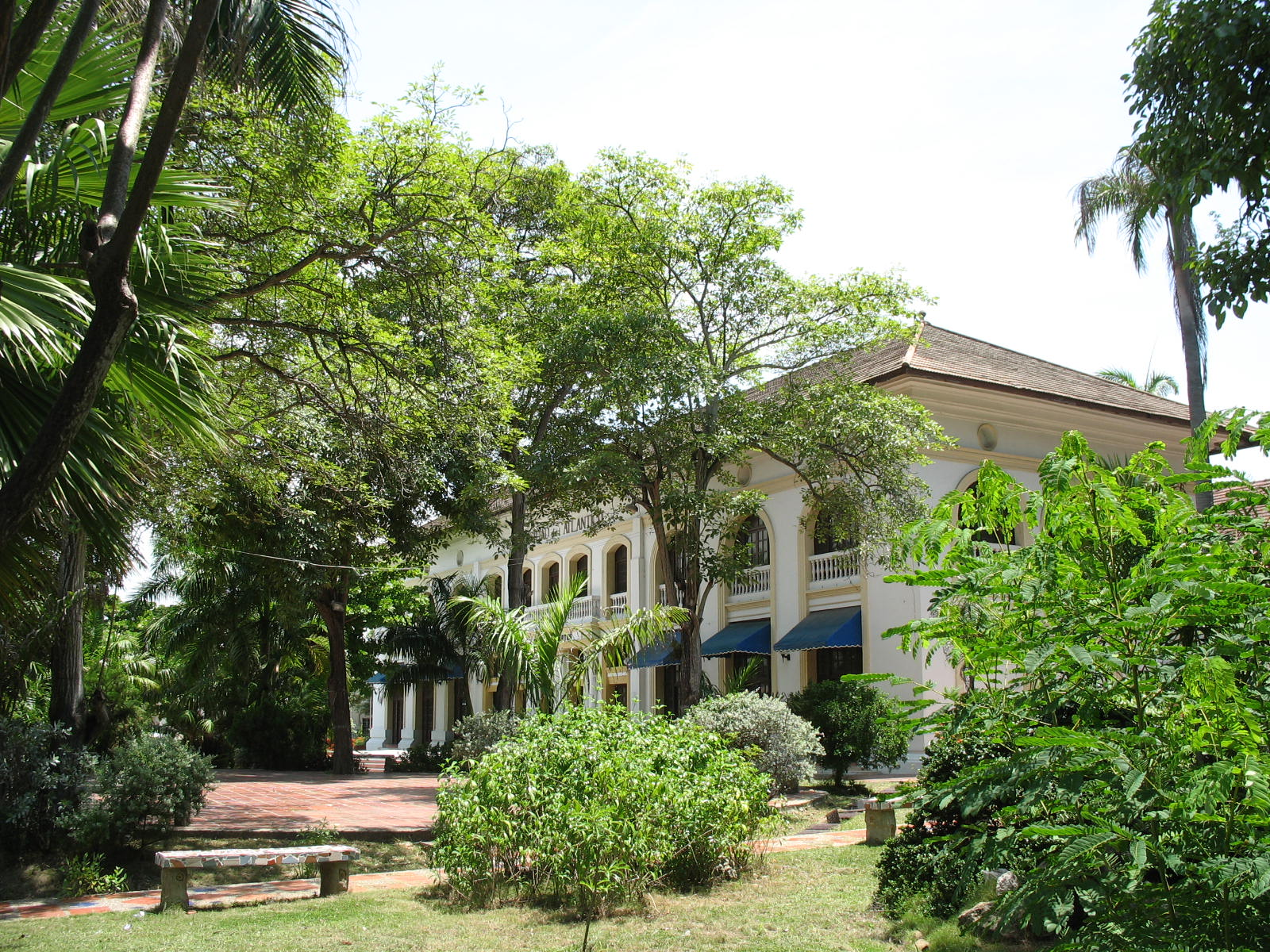
School of Fine Arts, University of Atlántico

The university has three campuses in the department of Atlántico. Its flagship campus in Barranquilla is divided into three locations. Its main one is known as the North Site and is located on the city's northern outskirts, where Barranquilla has experienced massive growth since the 2000s. Additionally, there are two other locations: the oldest one is the Downtown Site, a complex of historic buildings centrally located on 20 de Julio Avenue, and another is the School of Fine Arts, located in the historic El Prado neighborhood, a part of the city that stood as a model of Latin American urbanization in the 1950s.

In addition to its flagship campus in Barranquilla, the university has two satellite campuses throughout the department: one in the centrally located town of Sabanalarga and another in the rural locality of Suán, toward the southern end of the department.

== Organization ==
The university offers education at undergraduate and postgraduate levels, including a diverse range of engineering programs, as well as business management, law, education, fine arts, and several other areas of study.

== See also ==
- List of universities in Colombia
