= University of La Guajira =

- Spanish: Universidad de La Guajira; Wayuu: Shikii Ekirajia Pulee Wajira
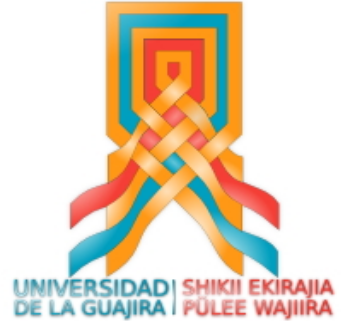
- Type: Public, Departmental
- Established: February 1977
- Rector: Carlos Arturo Robles Julio
- Location: Riohacha, La Guajira, Colombia
- Nickname: Uniguajira
- Website: http://www.uniguajira.edu.co

The University of La Guajira (Spanish: Universidad de La Guajira, Wayuu: Shikii Ekirajia Pulee Wajira), also known as Uniguajira, is a public, departmental university based primarily in the city of Riohacha, La Guajira, Colombia. The university was established by ordinance No. 011 and 012 of 1976, by the Departmental Assembly, and opened in February 1977. Its main campus, known as the University Citadel (Spanish: Ciudadela Universitaria), is located in the outskirts of the city, and it hosts the faculties of Basic Sciences, Economic and Administrative Sciences, Education Sciences, Engineering, and Social and Humanity Sciences. The university also has several satellite campuses across the department in the cities of Albania, Fonseca, Maicao, Manaure, and Villanueva, and one campus in the department of Córdoba in the city of Montería. The university offers education at technical, undergraduate and postgraduate levels. The mascot is a jellyfish, symbolizing power and simplicity.

== See also ==
- List of universities in Colombia
