= University of Sucre =

Colombian university

Coordinates: 9°18′52.80″N 75°23′18.08″W

Universidad de Sucre
- Universidad de Sucre
- Motto: 'Ciencia, desarrollo, tecnología'
- Motto in English: 'Science, development, Technology'
- Type: Public
- Established: November 24, 1977 (40 years)
- Endowment: 9.569'715.782 Colombian Pesos (5'662.553 US Dollars) (2006 Data)
- Rector: Rafael Peralta Castro
- Students: 7,000 approx.
- Location: Sincelejo, Sucre, Colombia
- Campus: Puerta Roja 245,700 m^{2} (60.7 acres) Puerta Blanca 17,000 m^{2} (4.2 acres) Puerta Verde 165,000 m^{2} (41 acres)
- Colors: Green and White
- Nickname: Unisucre
- Website: www.unisucre.edu.co

The Universidad de Sucre (Unisucre) is a public, departmental university located in Sincelejo, Sucre, Colombia. The university has three campuses in the city. The main one, known as the Puerta Roja is the home for most of the faculties and has the largest student population. The second and smaller campus, known as Puerta Blanca, is home to the Faculty of Health Sciences and it's near the University Hospital of Sincelejo. The third campus, known as Puerta Verde or the Granja Pericos is home to the Faculty of Agronomy Sciences and is in the outskirts of the city. The university offers education at undergraduate and postgraduate levels, with 16 academic programs across its five faculties.

== Campus ==
=== Library ===
The "Pompeyo Molina" Library, which is an integral part of the university, is the biggest in Sincelejo and the department of Sucre. In 2004, the new facility was opened to the public and included 14,047 books and 39 magazine titles.

== Academics ==
Unisucre has 12 undergraduate programs across four academic departments:

ACADEMIC DEPARTMENT
Engineering
Agricultural Engineering
Civil Engineering
Agricultural/Industrial Engineering
Electronic Engineering (Soon)
Health
Medicine
Nursing
Speech-language pathology
Economics & Management
Management
Economics
Science & Education
Mathematics
Biology
Farm Sciences
Animal science

SPECIALIZATIONS
Biostatistics
Environmental science
Public Management
Projects Management
Experimental Biologic Sciences
Administrative law
Human resources
Microbiology
DIPLOMA DEGREES
Environmental Management
English Instruction
Competitive Business Marketing
Quality management system
Plant systematics
New Technology & Mathematics Instruction
Ethnic Education Afro-Colombian
Ethnic Education Native-Indigenous
College Instruction
Archive

== See also ==
- List of universities in Colombia
