= University of Magdalena =

Coordinates: 11.2215°N 74.1862°W

- Universidad del Magdalena
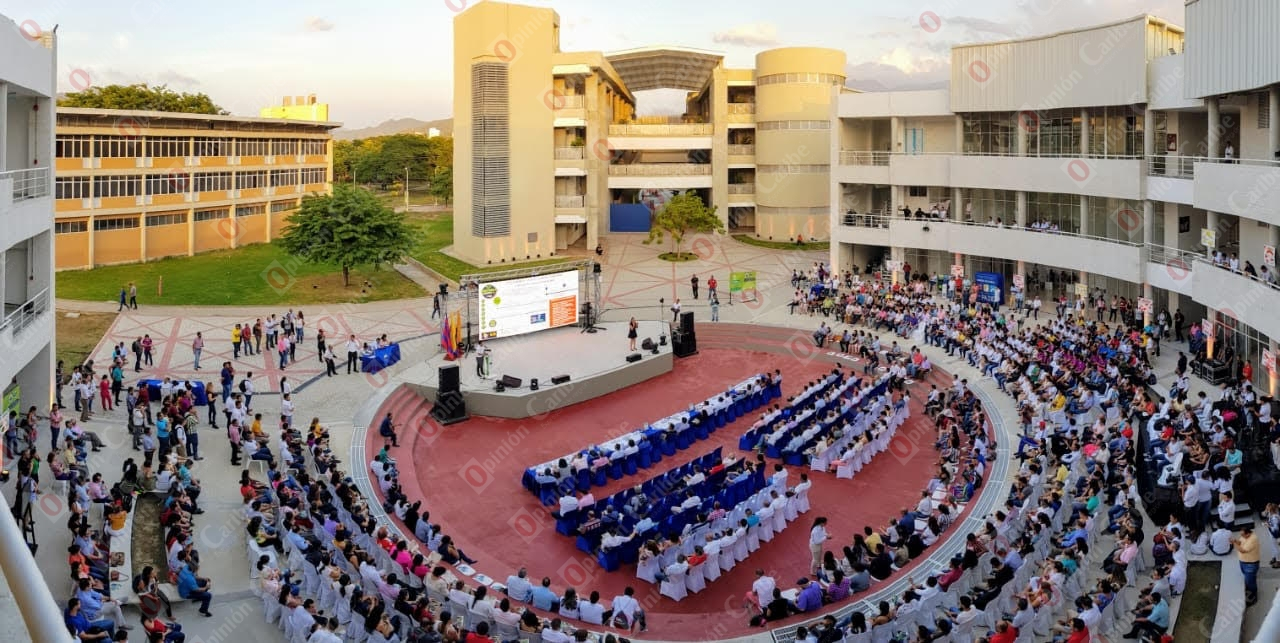
- Motto: Una universidad + incluyente e innovadora
- Motto in English: A more inclusive and innovative University
- Type: Public
- Established: October 27, 1958
- Rector: (Pablo Vera Salazar) (2016–2020)
- Students: 19,848 (2017)
- Location: Santa Marta, Magdalena, Colombia
- Nickname: Unimagdalena
- Website: http://www.unimagdalena.edu.co/

The University of Magdalena (Spanish: Universidad del Magdalena), is a public, departmental, coeducational, research university based in the city of Santa Marta, Magdalena, Colombia.

It received high quality institutional accreditation from the Ministry of National Education on August 26, 2016, for a period of four years, being the second public university in the region to receive such accreditation.

== See also ==
- List of universities in Colombia
