= Technological University of Chocó =

Public university in Colombia

Diego Luis Cordoba Technological University of Choco
- Universidad Tecnológica del Chocó Diego Luis Córdoba
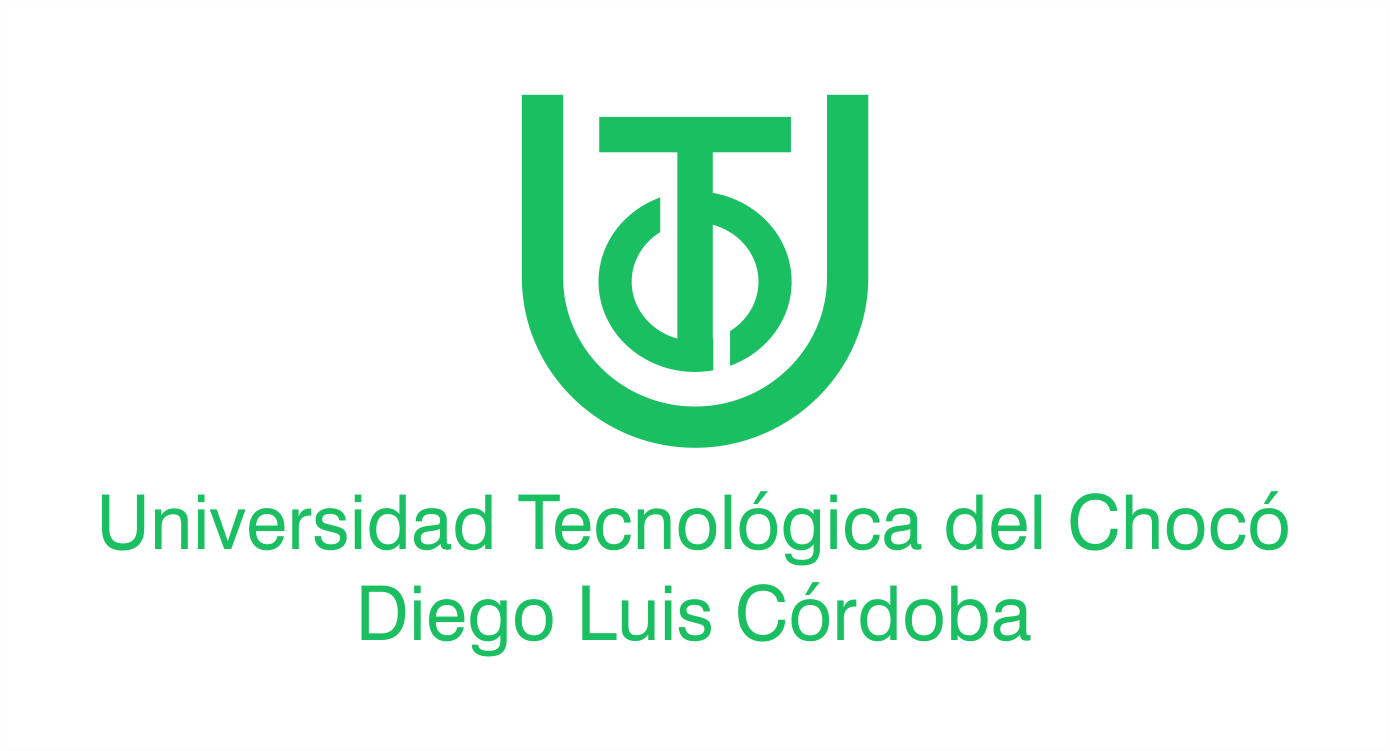
- Former names: Polytechnic University Institute "Diego Luis Córdoba" (1972 - 1975)
- Type: Public
- Established: 1972
- Location: Quibdó, Chocó, Colombia
- Nickname: UTCH
- Website: http://www.utch.edu.co/

The Diego Luis Cordoba Technological University of Choco (Spanish: Universidad Tecnológica del Chocó Diego Luis Córdoba), also known as UTCH, is a public, departmental university based in the city of Quibdó, Chocó, Colombia.

== See also ==
- List of universities in Colombia
