= Education in Argentina =

Secretariat of Education
- Secretary: Carlos Torrendell

National education budget (2024)
- Budget: 0,91% of GDP

General details
- Primary languages: Spanish, English

Literacy (2018)
- Total: 99.0%
- Male: 98.9%
- Female: 99.1%

Education in Argentina is a responsibility shared by the national government, the provinces and federal district and private institutions. Education at all levels, including university, is free. President Domingo Sarmiento's assertion that "the sovereign should be educated" has been a keystone of Argentine Education since 1918. Education has been extended nearly universally and its maintenance remains central to political and cultural debate. There are a significant number of private schools and universities despite free schooling.

Education in state institutions is at the initial, primary, secondary and tertiary levels and in the undergraduate university level (not for graduate programs). Private education is paid, although in some cases (especially in primary and secondary schools) state subsidies support its costs.

According to studies by UNESCO, guarantee equality to have institutional features that hinder the commercialization of education, as well as Finland has characteristics that favor multiethnic population education and special education, education favors Argentina equality. Illiteracy rates in Argentina are very low. According to the last census, the illiteracy rate is 1.9%, the second lowest in Latin America. In the last decade, Argentina has created nine new universities, while the outflow of university students increased by 68%.

== History ==
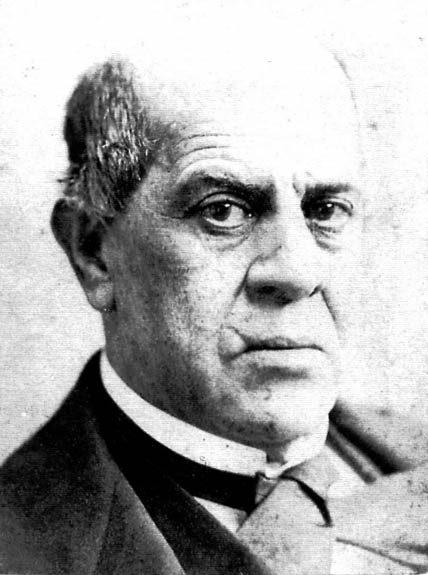
President Domingo F. Sarmiento, father of the Argentine Education System

The education in Argentina known as the Latin American docta has had a convoluted history. There was no effective education plan until President Domingo Sarmiento (1868–1874) placed emphasis on bringing Argentina up-to-date with practices in developed countries. Sarmiento encouraged the immigration and settling of European educators and built schools and public libraries throughout the country, in a program that doubled the enrollment of students during his term. Teacher's Day (on September 11) commemorates his death. The first national laws mandating universal, compulsory, free and secular education (Law 1420 of Common Education) were sanctioned in 1884 during the administration of President Julio Roca. The non-religious character of this system, which forbade parochial schools from issuing official degrees directly but only through a public university, harmed the relations between the Argentine State and the Catholic Church, leading to resistance from the local clergy and a heated conflict with the Holy See (through the Papal Nuncio).

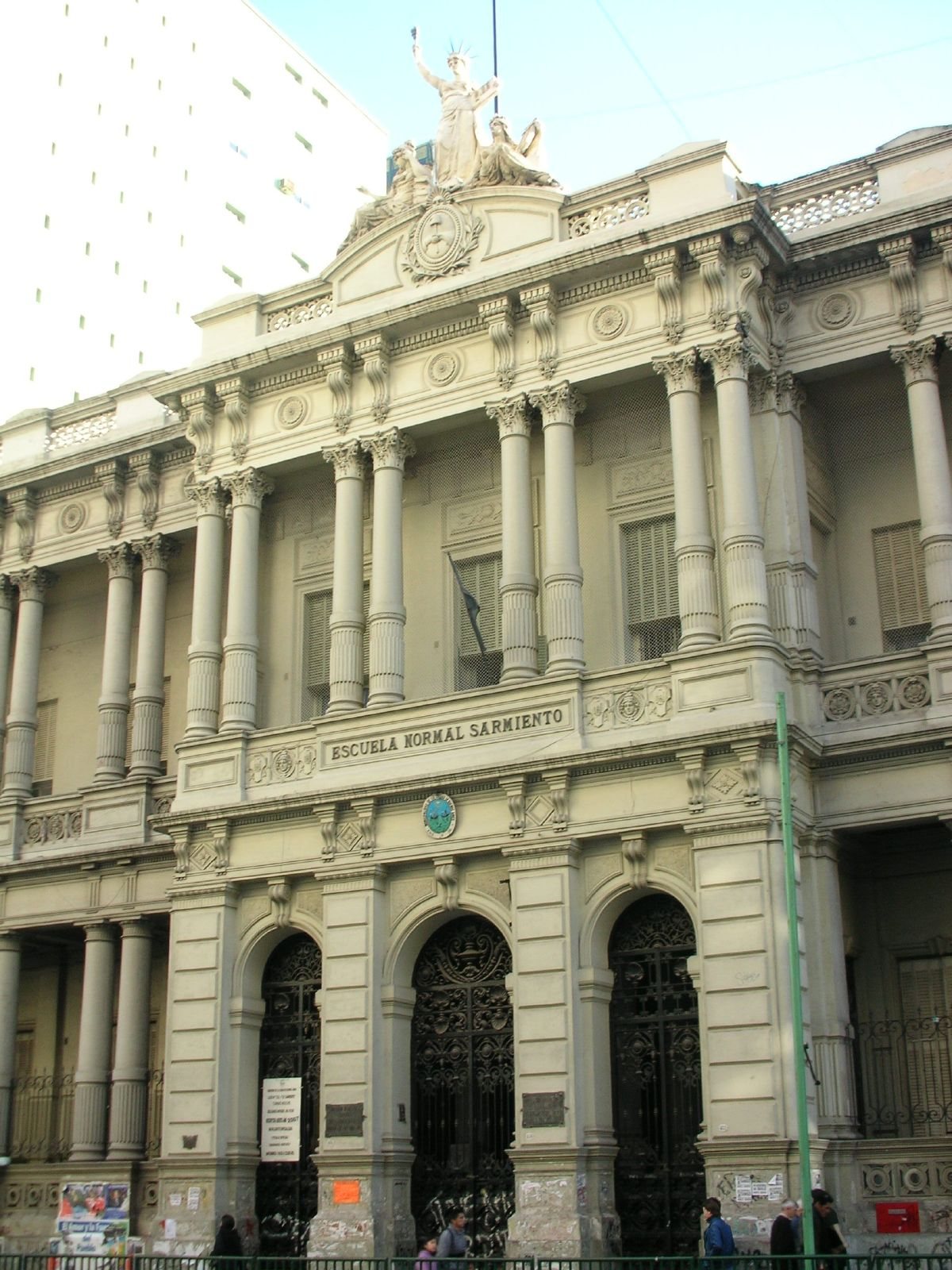
Sarmiento Teachers' College: President Domingo Sarmiento established the first of these Escuelas Normales

Following the University Reform of 1918, Argentine education, especially at university level, became more independent of the government, as well as the influential Catholic Church. The church began to re-emerge in country's secular education system during the administration Juan Perón, when in 1947, catechism was reintroduced in public schools, and parochial institutions began again receiving subsidies. A sudden reversal in the policy in 1954 helped lead to Perón's violent overthrow, after which his earlier, pro-clerical policies were reinstated by General Pedro Aramburu. Aramburu's Law 6403 of 1955, which advanced private education generally, and parochial, or more often, Catholic-run schools (those staffed with lay teachers), in particular, helped lead to the establishment of the Argentine Catholic University.

The program of deregulation and privatization pursued by President Carlos Menem in reaction to the country's socio-economic crisis of 1989 led to the decentralization of the Argentine secondary school system, whereby, from 1992 onward, the schools' administration and funding became a provincial responsibility. The policy's weakness, however, lay in that federal revenue sharing did not increase accordingly, particularly given the decision to shift two primary school years to the secondary system.

Real government spending on education increased steadily from the return of democratic rule in 1983 (with the exception of the crises in 1989 and 2002) and, in 2007, totaled over US$14 billion.

== Achievements ==
Argentina's higher education reached worldwide levels of excellence in the 1960s. Up to 2013 Argentina educated five Nobel Prize winners, three in the sciences: Luis Federico Leloir, Bernardo Houssay and César Milstein and two in peace: Carlos Saavedra Lamas and Adolfo Pérez Esquivel, the highest number surpassing countries economically more developed and populated as Ireland or Spain. In addition, as of 2010, Argentines are the only South Americans to have ever been honoured with a Rolf Schock Prize.

The Argentine population benefits from a relatively high level of educational attainment, by regional standards. Among those age 20 and over, the highest level attained, per the 2010 Census, was distributed thus:

No formal education	Incomplete primary	Complete primary	Incomplete secondary	Complete secondary	Incomplete tertiary	Complete tertiary	Incomplete university	Complete university
%	11.216%	25.401%	13.745%	20.109%	1.776%	5.890%	3.710%	6.395%

== Characteristics ==
Education in Argentina has four levels and two different systems: initial level (kindergarten, educación inicial), primary level (educación primaria), secondary level (educación secundaria) and tertiary level (educación superior).

In some provinces, primary level is called educación primaria or EP (Spanish for "primary education") and comprises grades first to sixth. Secondary level, called educación secundaria or ES (Spanish for "secondary education") comprises grades first to sixth (called years). EP and ES are divided in two stages, called ciclos ("cycles"):

1. EP: 1st, 2nd, 3rd, 4th, 5th and 6th school grades
2. ES: 1st, 2nd, 3rd, 4th, 5th and 6th school years

In some other provinces EP comprises grades first to seventh (the traditional system, established by Argentine law 1420/1884). ES comprises grades first to fifth (the traditional system, in use throughout the 20th century).

In both systems EP is mandatory to all students, as well as secondary education, according to the National Educational Law established in 2011.

The fourth stage is tertiary education, which includes both college and university education.

Education is funded by tax payers at all levels except for the majority of graduate studies. There are many private school institutions in the primary, secondary and university levels. Around 11.4 million people were enrolled in formal education of some kind in 2005:

Level	Schools	Teachers ^{1}	Students
Initial	16,298	79,721	1,324,529
Primary	22,196	289,898	4,683,963
Secondary	22,080	133,225	3,372,411
Vocational	1,870	15,747	509,134
Universities	85	117,359	1,527,310

^{1} excludes 185,776 teachers not classified by level

=== Qualification modes of grading ===
The scale to grade up the academic performance in students at most of the primary and secondary schools rests in the 1-10 ladder as is described in the following frame.

Evaluative qualifications
Rate/s	Type
10	Outstanding, Excellent
9 and 8	Highly Satisfactory
7 and 6	Satisfactory
5 and 4	Not satisfactory (failed)
3, 2, 1	Insufficient (failed, known as 'aplazo')

As of the start of the 2019 school year, in 16 out of 24 jurisdictions (23 provinces + the Autonomous City of Buenos Aires), 6 is the minimum passing grade, while in the others is 7. In the University System however the scale can vary depending on the independent policies and statutes of grading of each independent Argentine University.

=== Primary education ===
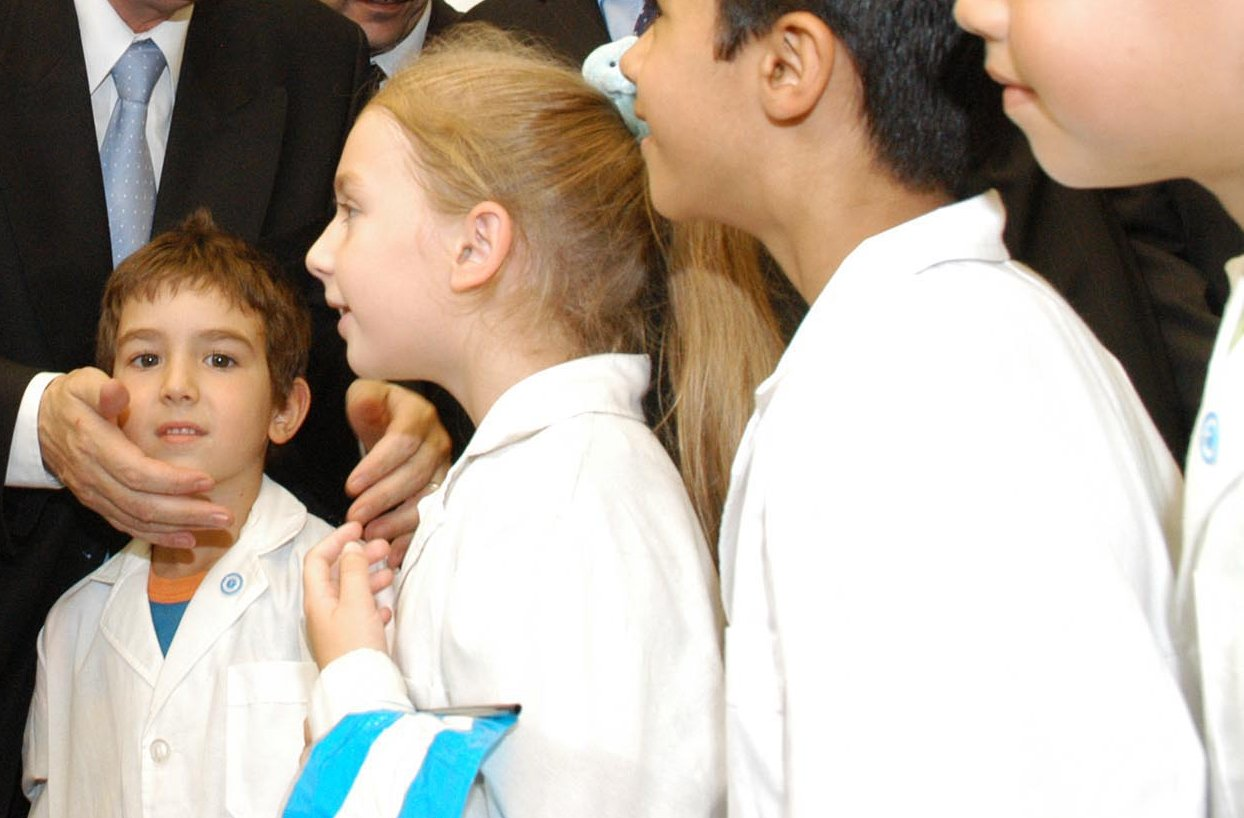
The ubiquitous white uniform of Argentine school children is a national symbol of learning.

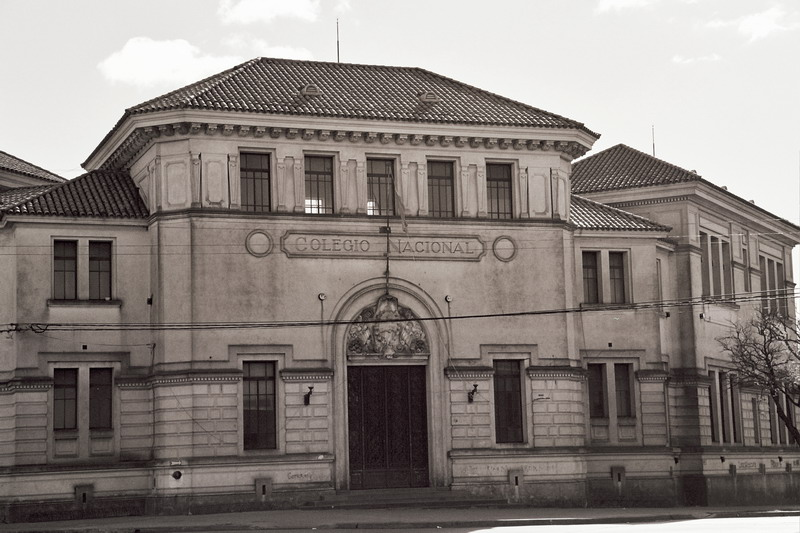
Secondary school in the Pampas city of Bragado. Argentina's secondary schools belong to a provincial system.

Accepted between ages 6 and 14. Primary education is the first EP cycle (grades 1–6). Because of the system that was in place during 1995–2007, most schools that offered 7 years of primary school prior to 1995 were forced to be converted and accept grades 8th and 9th, while others chose to eliminate 7th grade altogether, forcing students to complete the 3rd cycle in another institution.

=== Secondary education ===
Secondary education in Argentina comprises two levels. Years 1st to 3rd are common to all schools (Ciclo básico). Years 4th to 6th (in some provinces 4th to 5th) are organized in orientations (Ciclo orientado) such as Social Sciences, Natural Sciences, Arts, Sport, Design, etc. An additional year is offered in certain schools (Technical-Professional schools), which grants a professional title, also with orientations (agriculture, electricity, mechanics, construction, etc.).

In many provinces the secondary education system is still divided in three traditional large groups, "Bachiller" schools (very similar to grammar schools with a huge emphasis on humanistic studies), "Comercial" schools (focusing on economic sciences and everything related to it) and "Escuelas Técnicas" (with a focus on technical and scientific assignments, this one having the particularity of lasting six/seven years instead of five/six, it used to be called "Industrial") each one subdivided in more specific orientations related to its main branch.

In December 2006 the Chamber of Deputies of the Argentine Congress approved a new National Education Law restoring the old system of primary followed by secondary education, making secondary education obligatory and a right, and increasing the length of compulsory education to 12 years. The transitional period ended in 2011.

In addition an adult system of high schools (usually called Acelerados, Spanish for accelerated) exists in order to guarantee secondary education to people over 18. Normally it consists in 2 or 3 years of intensive program of study, which includes a 16 hour school day starting from 6am to 10pm, and it is provided by a large number of public and private schools varying on each province. Night shift is available in order to satisfy those who work during the day. These high school diplomas are accepted to enroll in a university.

Argentina's network of vocational schools, many under the auspices of the National Technological University (UTN) or the provincial educational systems, have historically given students viable alternatives, as well.

=== International education ===
As of January 2015, the International Schools Consultancy (ISC) listed Argentina as having 160 international schools. ISC defines an 'international school' in the following terms "ISC includes an international school if the school delivers a curriculum to any combination of pre-school, primary or secondary students, wholly or partly in English outside an English-speaking country, or if a school in a country where English is one of the official languages, offers an English-medium curriculum other than the country’s national curriculum and is international in its orientation." This definition is used by publications including The Economist.

=== Higher Education in Argentina ===
Argentine higher education system is based on the Spanish higher education system, a Continental education system. This is notable in its difference from the Anglo-Saxon Model. This has been true since its conception during the colonial period. The University Reform of 1918, took place in the oldest university in the Country, the Universidad de Córdoba. This revolution paved the way to the modernization of the Argentinian higher university systems as it is known nowadays. Since its foundation, it was focused on the teaching of Professions offering Professional degrees.

- Higher education institutes: 1- to 5-year degrees related to education or technical professions like Teachers, Professorship, Technicians.
- Universities: 4- to 7-years of professional education taught at universities offering many different degrees, such as Licentiate, Engineer's degree, Medic Title, Attorney Title, Professorships, Translation degrees, etc.
- Post-graduate degrees: This is a specialized and research-oriented education level. It is roughly divided in a first sub-level where a Specialist degree can be obtained in a 12–18 months period or Master's degree, requiring 24–30 months and an original research work and a higher sub-level where a Doctorate degree could be achieved.

==== Funding ====
One important aspect is that Public universities at tertiary education level and at university level are tuition-free and open to anyone. Although it is not required to pay any kind of fee at universities, hidden costs of education, like transportation and materials, are often neglected. The lack of a well-developed and widespread scholarship system makes it hard for students from low-income families to enroll in public universities: for each eight students from the 20% upper-income class, there is only one student from the 20% lower-income class. In contrast, post-graduate education requires some form of funding and it is generally not free.

Additionally, financial pressure to freshman college students force them to join the work force before graduation, thus it is very common for young students to have full-time jobs and at the same time study at the university. This is considered beneficial because when the students graduate they already have working experience, though this could also be one of the causes of the high ratio of dropouts.

==== College education ====
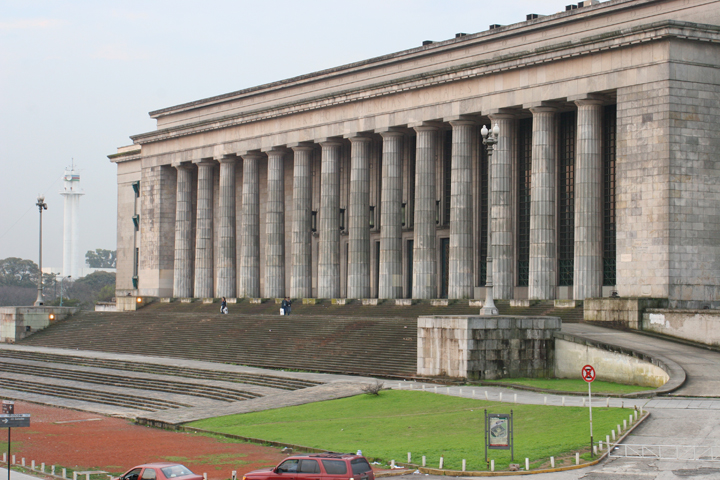
The University of Buenos Aires Law School

Argentina maintains a network of 39 National universities, financed by the Ministry of Education since 1946. Private and parochial universities are also abundant, numbering 46 among the active institutions and they enroll about a sixth of the collegiate student body (see University reform in Argentina and List of universities in Argentina). Summing up, over 1.5 million students attend institutions of higher learning in Argentina, annually (roughly half the population of college age).

Argentina does not have a standard and common system of examination after high school, thus admission to universities is strictly defined by each university. Moreover, a steady degradation in primary and secondary education created a huge difference between the required level to enter a university and the level achieved by the high school students. Some universities like University of Buenos Aires cope with this issue by creating a 1-year shared program called CBC that students need to complete in order to join the university. In April 2024, tens of thousands of people took to the streets in Argentina's capital Buenos Aires to demand increased funding for public universities.

Between 2010 and 2020, the Argentine university system recorded more than 1.32 million graduates; 68% came from public universities (880,494) versus 443,300 from private institutions, according to Ministry of Education data obtained via access-to-information request and published by Chequeado. The University of Buenos Aires had the highest number of graduates (182,131), followed by the National University of Rosario (104,920), the National University of Córdoba (80,891), and the National University of La Plata (69,729). In the private sector, Universidad Siglo 21 recorded 49,678 degrees over the decade—more than UADE and the UAI.

==== Graduate school ====
The doctoral fields of study in Argentina are generally research-oriented doctoral studies, leading mostly to the awarding of the degrees of Doctor of Philosophy, Doctor of Science, Doctor of Medicine, and Doctor of Law, among others. Enrollment in doctorate programs in Argentina is available to candidates having earned a Licentiate, Professorships Engineer's degree or Master's degree in a related area of study.

Doctoral fields of study mostly pertain to one of five fields of knowledge: Applied Sciences, Basic Sciences, Health Sciences, Human Sciences and Social Sciences. The doctoral studies offered by the Argentine universities include multiple fields and do have national and international validity of the degrees granted.

Academic regulations governing doctorates, and their corresponding fields, in Argentina prescribe that all graduate courses must be accredited by the National Commission for University Evaluation and Accreditation. This entity stands as a public and decentralized body working under the jurisdiction of the Department of Education, Science and Technology. It administers the process of evaluation and accreditation for all doctorate programs, and is responsible for the institutional evaluation of all such programs at a national level. Graduate programs, including the Doctorados (PhDs), set standards per guidelines set forth by the Ministry of Science and Technology, together with the Universities Council.

Additionally, external evaluations of the doctoral programs are carried out by the National Commission for University Evaluation and Accreditation, or private entities created to that effect, together with the participation of academic peers. Argentine institutions of higher education provide further accreditation by international establishments to many of their courses of studies.

== Universities ==
=== Public universities ===
- Autonomous University of Entre Ríos
- University of Buenos Aires
- Arturo Jauretche National University
- National University of Avellaneda
- National University of Catamarca
- National University of Chilecito
- National University of Córdoba
- National University of Cuyo
- National University of the Delta
- National University of Entre Ríos
- National University of Formosa
- National University of General San Martín
- National University of General Sarmiento
- Guillermo Brown National University
- National University of José C. Paz
- National University of Jujuy
- National University of La Matanza
- National University of La Pampa
- National University of Patagonia
- National University of Patagonia Austral
- National University of La Plata
- National University of La Rioja
- National University of Lanús
- National University of Lomas de Zamora
- National University of Luján
- National University of Mar del Plata
- National University of Misiones
- National University of Moreno
- National University of Quilmes
- National University of Río Cuarto
- National University of Río Negro
- National University of Rosario
- National University of Salta
- National University of San Juan
- National University of San Luis
- National University of Santiago del Estero
- National University of the South
- National University of Tierra del Fuego
- National University of Tres de Febrero
- National University of Tucumán
- National University of Villa María
- National University of Villa Mercedes
- National University of Central Buenos Aires
- National University of Austral Chaco
- National University of Comahue
- National University of Litoral
- National University of Noroeste of Buenos Aires
- National University of the Oeste
- National Technological University
- National University Of San Antonio De Areco

=== Private universities ===
- Technological Institute of Buenos Aires
- University Institute of Health Sciences - HA Barceló Foundation
- H. A. Barceló Foundation
- Open Interamerican University
- Adventist University of Plata
- Argentina University of the Company
- Universidad Argentina John F. Kennedy
- Atlantis Argentina University
- Austral University (Argentina)
- University Blas Pascal
- Caece University
- Catholic University Argentina
- Catholic University of Córdoba
- Catholic University of Cuyo
- Catholic University of La Plata
- Catholic University of Parana
- Catholic University of Salta
- Catholic University of Santa Fe
- Catholic University of Santiago del Estero
- Champagnat University
- University of Belgrano
- CEMA University
- Universidad Argentina de la Empresa
- University of Business and Social Sciences
- University of Concepcion del Uruguay
- University of Congress
- University of Flores
- University of Cuenca del Plata
- University of the Fraternity of St. Thomas Aquino Groupings
- University of Merchant
- University of Mendoza
- University of Morón
- University of Palermo
- University of San Andrés
- University of San Isidro (USI)
- University of Sao Paulo (Tucuman)
- University of Aconcagua
- University of the Latin American Educational Center
- University of Cinema
- University of the Argentine Social Museum
- University of North St. Thomas Aquinas
- University of Salvador
- 21st Century Business University
- University Favaloro
- University ISALUD
- Juan Agustín Maza University
- University Maimonides
- University Notarial Argentina
- Torcuato di Tella University

== See also ==
- Academic ranks in Argentina
- Argentine Federation of Associations of Teachers of English
- Argentine University Federation
- Domingo Faustino Sarmiento
- List of universities in Argentina
- Science and technology in Argentina
- University reform in Argentina
