= Doctor of Science =

Doctoral academic research degree

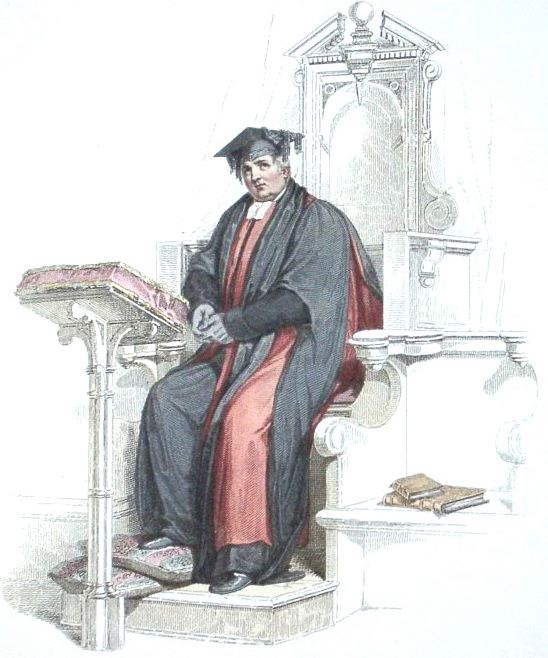
Aquatint of a Doctor in divinity at the University of Oxford, shown wearing convocation dress.

A Doctor of Science (Latin: Scientiae Doctor; most commonly abbreviated DSc or ScD) is a higher science doctorate awarded in a number of countries throughout the world. A Doctor of Science (DSc) degree signifies advanced expertise and significant contributions to a scientific or technical field and is often seen as a more practice-oriented counterpart to the PhD, emphasizing applied research, innovation, and practical impact. In some countries, like the UK, Australia, India and New Zealand, the DSc is a superior higher doctorate, awarded for exceptional achievements through community work or lifetime scholarly contributions as an ultimate terminal degree of the highest order.

== Africa ==
=== Algeria and Morocco ===
In Algeria, Morocco, Libya and Tunisia, all universities accredited by the state award a "Doctorate" in all fields of science and humanities, equivalent to a PhD in the United Kingdom or United States.

Some universities in these four North African countries award a "Doctorate of the State" in some fields of study and science. A "Doctorate of the State" is slightly higher in esteem than a regular doctorate, and is awarded after performing additional in-depth post-doctorate research or achievement.

== Asia ==
=== Japan ===
Similarly to in the US and most of Europe, Japanese universities offer both the PhD and the ScD as initial doctorates in science.

=== India ===
In India a few private and government universities offer a DSc degree which goes through rigorous evaluation by a scientific committee prior to being conferred after assessing knowledge, academic contributions, community/social impact independently.

Some universities who offer a DSc are Banaras Hindu University, SR University, University of Delhi.

=== Thailand ===
Higher education institutes in Thailand generally grant a PhD as a doctoral research degree, some universities including Chulalongkorn University award a DSc. In exception, Mahidol University can grant both PhD and DSc. Doctoral students in Faculty of Science are always awarded a PhD, but some other programs award a DSc.

=== Uzbekistan ===
DSc or PhD degrees are awarded after dissertation and fulfilling the required publication number. In order to qualify for DSc, one is required to have attained a PhD. The higher education institutes in Uzbekistan also grant DSc degrees. As an example, the National University of Uzbekistan and the Uzbekistan Academy of Sciences offer DSc in various fields.

== Europe ==
=== Austria, Germany, and Switzerland ===
In Germany, Austria, and the German-speaking region of Switzerland, common doctoral degrees in science are the following:

- Dr. techn.: Doctor technicae, awarded by Austrian technical universities. In German: "Doktor der technischen Wissenschaften" which translates to Doctor of Engineering Sciences, or Doctor of Science, or Doctor of Technical Sciences, or Doctor of Technology. Dr.techn. title is also awarded in Denmark.
- Dr. rer. nat.: Doctor rerum naturalium, literally "Doctor of the things of nature"
- Dr. rer. medic.: Doctor rerum medicarum, Doctor of medical sciences
- Dr. sc. med.: Doctor scientiarum medicarum, Doctor of science in medicine
- Dr. sc. nat.: Doktor der Naturwissenschaften, Doctor of Natural Sciences
- Dr. sc. ETH: Doktor der Naturwissenschaften ETH, Doctor of Natural Sciences, awarded by ETH Zurich, Switzerland.
- Dr. phil. nat.: Doctor philosophiae naturalis, used only by Goethe University Frankfurt instead of Dr rer. nat; Doctor of Natural Sciences, awarded by Swiss universities.
- Dr.-Ing.: Doktor der Ingenieurwissenschaften (Doctor of Engineering), awarded by German universities in areas of technology and engineering.
- Dr. mont.: Doctor rerum montanarum, awarded by the University of Leoben instead of Dr. techn.
- Dr. nat. techn.: Doctor rerum naturalium technicarum, awarded by the University of Natural Resources and Life Sciences, Vienna instead of Dr. techn.

In these countries there are some related doctoral degrees with very similar names, these are the:

- Dr. sc. agr.: Doctor scientiarum agrariarum, Doctor of Agricultural science
- Dr. sc. hum.: Doctor scientiarum humanarum, Doctor of Humanistic Sciences
- Dr. sc. inf.: Doctor scientiarum informaticarum, Doctor of Science in Informatics
- Dr. sc. inf. med.: Doctor scientiarum informaticarum medicæ, Doctor of Science in Medical Informatics
- Dr. sc. inf. biomed.: Doctor scientiarum informaticarum biomedicæ, Doctor of Science in Biomedical Informatics
- Dr. sc. math.: Doctor scientiarum mathematicarum, Doctor of Mathematics
- Dr. scient. med.: Doctor scientiæ medicæ, Doctor of Medical Sciences
- Dr. sc. mus.: Doctor scientiae musicae, Doctor of Musicology
- Dr. sc. oec.: Doctor scientiarum oeconomicarum, Doctor of Economics
- Dr. sc. pol.: Doctor scientiarum politicarum, Doctor of Political Sciences
- Dr. rer. pol.: Doctor rerum politicarum, Doctor of economics, business administration, or political science
- Dr. sc. soc.: Doctor scientiae socialis, Doctor of Social Sciences

All of these doctoral degrees are equivalent to the PhD or ScD of the American system. Until German Reunification, universities in East Germany also awarded the Dr Sc. However, the East German Dr Sc was not equivalent to the PhD since it was adopted to replace the German Habilitation and therefore was equivalent to this higher-level qualification. After reunification the Habilitation was reintroduced at universities in Eastern Germany.

The procedure of habilitation is normally required to receive officially the "venia docendi", which entitles the candidate to lecture at universities (Privatdozent, for men, or Privatdozentin, for women). The academic degree after the successful habilitation is e.g. Dr. rer. nat. habil., by adding the suffix "habil." to the earlier received Doctors degree.

In Switzerland, the Dr sc. is a doctoral degree awarded only by the two Swiss Federal Institutes of Technology (EPFL and ETHZ), the University of Fribourg and the Department of Informatics of the University of Zurich. The Swiss Dr sc., like the DSc in the US, is equivalent to the PhD. It is earned with the approval of a committee on the basis of original research, publications, and extensive applied professional contributions and is awarded in doctoral level science and technology programs. Since 2004 the Dr sc. is the only doctoral degree awarded by the ETH Zurich. The École polytechnique fédérale de Lausanne awards the degree Docteur ès sciences, abbreviated Dr ès sc.and translated into English as PhD.

=== Poland ===
In Poland, Habilitation (habilitated doctor, doctor with habilitation, doktor habilitowany or dr hab. in Polish) is a doctoral degree higher than PhD awarded for substantial accomplishments in academic teaching, research and service after getting a PhD degree. It usually involves up to 8 years of original research and multiple publications in peer reviewed scientific journals and monograph and a habilitation dissertation after a PhD. It is similar to habilitation degree in Germany and Austria. It is also similar (in terms of requirements) to associate professor with tenure.

After achieving higher degrees and rich research or artistic achievements, including as a lecturer, one can apply to become a professor. Habilitation has been a mandatory requirement for many years to apply for a professorship in Poland.

The President of Poland awards a scientist, engineer or artist the scientific title of professor (tytuł naukowy profesora) or the title of professor of art (tytuł profesora sztuki), respectively, in recognition of their achievements and contributions to science, technology, or art. These titles are not academic, scientific or art degrees. However, possession of high degrees is required to receive the title.

=== United Kingdom, Ireland, India, Pakistan and the Commonwealth ===
In Ireland, the United Kingdom and the countries of the Commonwealth, such as Australia, New Zealand and India (in the Indian Institute of Technology, Bombay), the degree of Doctor of Science (DSc or ScD) is one of the Higher Doctorates. In some older universities it typically has precedence after Divinity, Laws or Civil Law, Medicine, and Letters, and above Music. The degree is conferred on a member of the university who has a proven record of internationally recognised scholarship. A candidate for the degree will usually be required to submit a selection of their publications that follow a consistent theme to the board of the appropriate faculty, which will decide if the candidate merits this accolade. Quite often they will need to be a doctoral graduate of at least ten years' standing and have a substantial research association with the awarding university.

The first university to institute a degree under this name was the University of London in 1860. However, this was a taught postgraduate degree and was not reconfigured into a research degree, the modern PhD, until 1885. Edinburgh also had an early DSc, which did have research elements, that became a fully research degree (again similar to the modern PhD) in 1895. The first DScs in their current form as higher doctorates were introduced by Durham University in 1882 and the University of Cambridge in 1883. In 1893 Maria Gordon (née Ogilvie) was the first woman to receive a research DSc, from the University of London, although Charlotte Scott received a taught DSc from the same university in 1885.

In former times the doctorate in science was regarded as a greater distinction than a professorial chair and hence a professor who was also a DSc would be known as Doctor. The Doctor of Science may also be awarded as an honorary degree, that is, given to individuals who have made extensive contributions to a particular field and not for specific academic accomplishments. It is usual to signify this by adding DSc h.c. (for honoris causa).

=== Other European Union countries ===
In the Czech Republic and Slovakia "Doctor of Sciences" (DrSc behind the name), established in 1953, is equivalent to the degree of Doctor of Science in the sense in which the DSc is used in the Commonwealth. It is the highest academic qualification, different from both PhD and PhDr. titles. In the Czech Republic, DrSc has not been awarded since 2001; instead, since 2006, a "Doctor of Sciences" degree (DSc behind the name) has been awarded, not by universities but by the Czech Academy of Sciences mostly for research in the field of natural or formal science. In Slovakia, "Doctor of Sciences" (DrSc) is awarded by the Slovak Academy of Sciences.

In Hungary, "Doctor of Sciences" (DSc) is a higher doctoral degree awarded by the Hungarian Academy of Sciences.

In Finland, most doctoral degrees awarded in the fields of natural sciences, technology and economics are termed DSc degrees in English, with a suffix indicating the field of study. However, there is no translation of the term Doctor of Science to Finnish. For example, the proper translation for the doctorate in technology (tekniikan tohtori) would be DSc (Tech), whereas a doctorate in economics and business administration (kauppatieteiden tohtori) would be translated as DSc (Econ). When conversing or writing in English, the prefix Dr may be used to address a holder of a doctoral degree awarded in Finland. The degrees are equivalent to filosofian tohtori (FT, English: PhD), but FT is usually awarded only in general sciences, not in specializations like engineering, economics or medicine.

In France, the Doctor of Sciences degree (doctorat en sciences also called doctorat d'État) was a higher doctorate in the fields of experimental and natural sciences, superseded in 1984 by the habilitation.

In Denmark, Dr Scient. is a higher doctorate.

In Bulgaria, "Doctor" (PhD) is the highest education level and first science degree. Doctor of Sciences (DrSc) is the second and the highest science degree.

=== Russia and other post-communist states ===
In Russia, the status of Russian Doktor Nauk (literally 'Doctor of Sciences') is considered a higher scientific degree. The equivalent to PhD is "Kandidat Nauk" (literally 'Candidate [for Doctor] of Science')

=== Other European countries ===
In the former Yugoslavia, (Croatia, Serbia, Bosnia and Herzegovina, Montenegro, Slovenia, North Macedonia), title doktor nauka or doktor znanosti (literally "doctor of science") is used in a much broader sense than DSc, simply referring to a field of academic study – from art history (doktor znanosti/nauka povijesti umjetnosti), philosophy (doktor znanosti/nauka filozofije), and literary studies (doktor znanosti/nauka književnosti) to hard sciences such as molecular biology (doktor znanosti/nauka molekularne biologije). It is therefore formally recognized as a PhD degree.

Starting in 2016, in Ukraine Doctor of Philosophy (PhD, Ukrainian: Доктор філософії) is the highest education level and first science degree. "Doctor of Sciences" (DSc Ukrainian: Доктор наук) is the second and the highest science degree, awarded in recognition of a substantial contribution to scientific knowledge, origination of new directions and visions in science. Since 2016, a PhD degree is one of the prerequisites for heading a university department in Ukraine.

In Belarus "Doctor of Sciences" (DSc, Belarusian: Доктар навук) is the highest level of education that follows a PhD. Is awarded by The Higher Attestation Commission under the aegis of the President of the Republic of Belarus.

== North America ==
=== United States ===
In the United States, the formally recognized traditional Doctor of Science is an academic research doctoral degree awarded by research universities. The academic research ScD (or DSc) is not higher than a PhD as is the case in some European countries.

The first North American ScD was inaugurated by Harvard University in 1872, when graduate studies first began at Harvard, and where the PhD and ScD degrees were introduced in the same year. The Doctor of Science research degree is earned with the formal dissertation defense and approval of a committee on the basis of original research and publications, and it is awarded predominantly in doctoral-level science programs, such as engineering, medical and health sciences, and health economics.

Although rarer than the Doctor of Philosophy, the Doctor of Science is awarded by institutions including:

- Harvard University
- Columbia University
- Chapman University
- Middle Georgia State University
- Johns Hopkins University
- Massachusetts Institute of Technology
- Capitol Technology University
- Bowie State University
- Towson University
- Tulane University
- University of Baltimore
- Marymount University
- Rocky Mountain University of Health Professions
- Aspen University in Computer Science
- University of Massachusetts Lowell in public health (epidemiology)
- Jacksonville State University in emergency management
- Spertus Institute for Jewish Learning and Leadership in Jewish studies.
- The George Washington University (although as of 2011 the university decided to offer only the more widely recognized PhD degree)

A few university doctoral research programs offer both the Doctor of Science and Doctor of Philosophy degrees in the same academic field, such as Johns Hopkins University and Massachusetts Institute of Technology, with identical requirements for obtaining either. Research programs that offer the formal research ScD but not the PhD degree for a given field include several doctoral programs at Harvard University, Boston University, Capitol Technology University, and Texas Tech University Health Sciences Center. The University of Baltimore, School of Information Arts and Technologies offers a DSc degree in Information and Interaction Design, a program focused on usable design/user experience (UX) and Human Computer Interaction (HCI).

There are programs where the Doctor of Science and Doctor of Philosophy have different degree requirements, though the two degrees are officially considered equivalent. The Engineering school at Washington University in St. Louis, for example, requires four more graduate courses in the DSc program, which can be completed in one year in conjunction with research duties, while the PhD requires teaching assistance services. The Johns Hopkins University also offers both PhD and ScD in certain programs, with only minor differences in university administration of the degrees. In some institutions, the ScD has been converted to the PhD. For instance, the doctoral degree in biostatistics at Harvard recently converted from ScD to PhD, even though the doctoral degree structure and requirements have remained identical.

=== Mexico ===
In Mexico the PhD level is considered a doctoral degree (level 8) similar to the doctorate in Canada and the United States. The Doctor of Sciences degree is instead recognized as a Higher Degree (Grado Propio).

=== Costa Rica ===
In Costa Rica, doctorates are the highest academic degrees awarded by a university. They are focused on research and accessible only after the study of an academic Master's degree (as opposed to a professional Master's degree, intended for practical subjects). The University of Costa Rica, for example, offers a general Doctor of Sciences degree for students of all natural and exact sciences, a Doctor of Engineering degree for students of Engineering (in cooperation with the Costa Rica Institute of Technology), and a few other doctorate programs on applied sciences (for example, in Agricultural Sciences or Informatics).

== South America ==
=== Argentina ===
In Argentina the formal title Doctor of Science would be attributed to different fields of the hard or soft sciences. To get into an Argentine PhD program the applicant must have experience in research and at least an Engineering, Licentiate or master's degree:

==== Applied sciences ====
- Doctorate of Agronomic Sciences (University of Buenos Aires, NU of LP, NU of C, NU of R, NU of MP, NU of the S)
- Doctorate of Sciences in Lacteal Technology (NU of the L)
- Doctorate of Sciences in Material Technology (NU of the S, NU of MP)
- Doctorate of Computer Sciences (University of Buenos Aires, NU of C, NU of SL, NU of the S)
- Doctorate of Engineering Sciences (NU of C, NU of Cu, NU of RC, NU of the S, ITBA)
- Doctorate of Geological Sciences (NU of C, NU of Cu, NU of SJ, NU of SL, NU of the S)
- Doctorate of Informatics Sciences (NU of LP)
- Doctorate of Basic Sciences Applied (NU of Q)
- Doctorate of Science and Technology (NU of GS)
- Doctorate of Geological Sciences (University of Buenos Aires)
- Doctorate of Molecular Biology and Biotechnology (NU of SAM)
- Doctorate of Systems Control (NU of the S)
- Doctorate of Economics Sciences (NU of LM)
- Doctorate of Economy (NU of LP, NU of the S)
- Doctorate of Geography (NU of the S)
- Doctorate of History (NU of the S)
- Doctorate of Chemical Engineering (NU of the S)

==== Basic sciences ====
- Doctorate of Astrophysics (NU of GSM)
- Doctorate of Biological Sciences (U of BA, NU of LP, NU of C, NU of R, NU of the L, NU of Cu, NU of RC, NU of MP, NU of the S)
- Doctorate of Biological Chemistry Sciences (U of BA, NU of the S)
- Doctorate of Molecular Biology Sciences (U of BA)
- Doctorate of Mathematics Sciences (U of BA, NU of LP, NU of SL, NU of the S)
- Doctorate of Chemistry Sciences (NU of LP, NU of R, NU of C, NU of RC, NU of MP, NU of the S)
- Doctorate of Physics Sciences (U of BA, NU of LP, NU of MP, NU of SAM, NU of the S)
- Doctorate of Natural Sciences (U of BA, NU of LP)
- Doctorate of Philosophy (NU of the S)

=== Brazil ===
In Brazil only the Doctor in Sciences (DSc) category is recognized as a higher doctorate, generally followed by the concentration area (program field).

This kind of doctorate is obtained in Graduate School after satisfactory evaluation of knowledge, research accomplishment, and thesis defense. This doctorate is comparable to a PhD program found in other countries. In the state of São Paulo, the doctorate title is the second highest academic title given by the state's universities (University of São Paulo (USP), State University of Campinas (UNICAMP) and São Paulo State University (UNESP)) and most Federal Universities, such as the Federal University of São Paulo (UNIFESP). In those universities, the highest academic title conferred is the Portuguese: Livre-Docência.
