= Río Cuarto, Córdoba =

Río Cuarto
- City
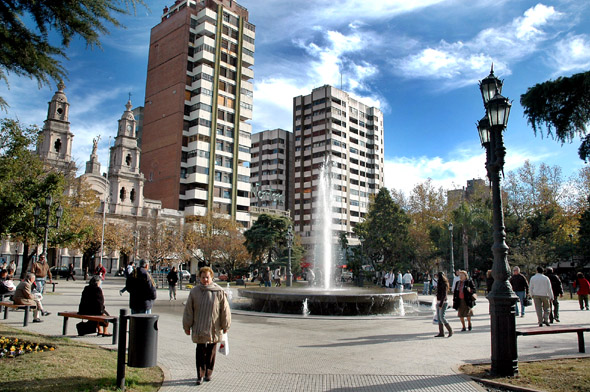
- Roca Square

- Flag

- Location within Córdoba Province Location within Argentina Location within South America
- Coordinates: 33°8′S 64°21′W
- Country: Argentina
- Province: Córdoba
- Department: Río Cuarto

Government
  - Intendant: Guillermo Luis De Rivas (PJ)

Area
  - Total: 64.25 km^{2} (24.81 sq mi)
- Elevation: 452 m (1,483 ft)

Population (2010 census)
  - Total: 157,010
  - Density: 2,444/km^{2} (6,329/sq mi)
- Time zone: UTC−3 (ART)
- CPA base: X5800
- Dialing code: +54 358
- Website: Official website

Río Cuarto is a city in the province of Córdoba, Argentina. Located in the south of the province, it has about 157,000 inhabitants (2010 census [INDEC]) and is an important commercial and agricultural hub.

== Overview ==
The Río Cuarto River flows through the province of Córdoba; its central location in the Humid Pampas favored the city's development as a transport hub for much of the surrounding agriculture, and several slaughterhouses and food processing plants opened in Río Cuarto during the twentieth century.

Río Cuarto was founded on November 11, 1786, as Villa de la Concepción del Río Cuarto, by the colonial Governor Rafael de Sobremonte. Its first rail connection was by way of the former Andean Railway in 1870, after which the village grew rapidly with the influx of Italian and Spanish immigrants (mainly as tenant farmers). The municipal government charter establishing the modern system of elected mayors and city council was enacted in 1883; the city's first elected mayor was Moysés Irusta.

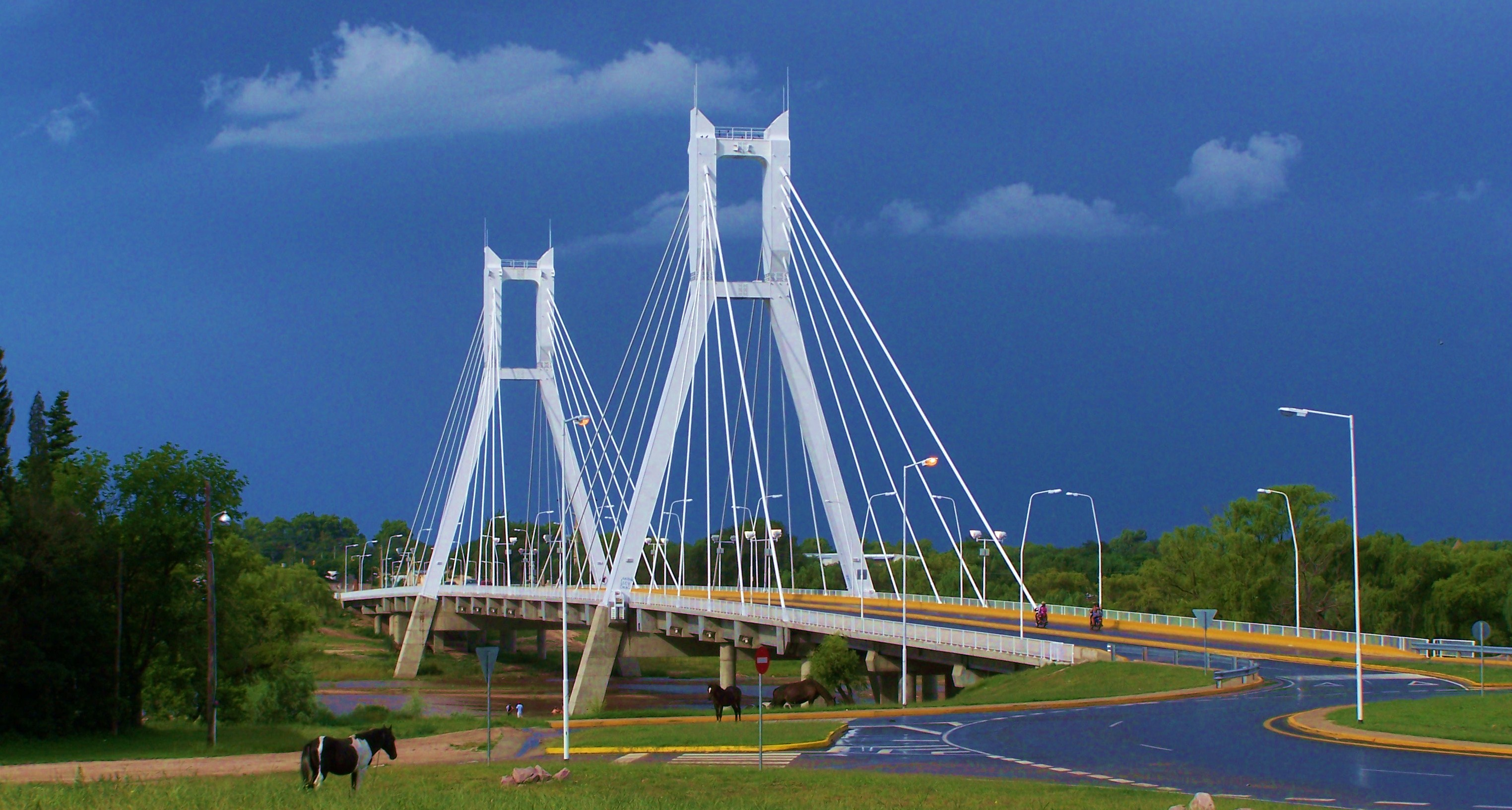
The Bicentennial Bridge

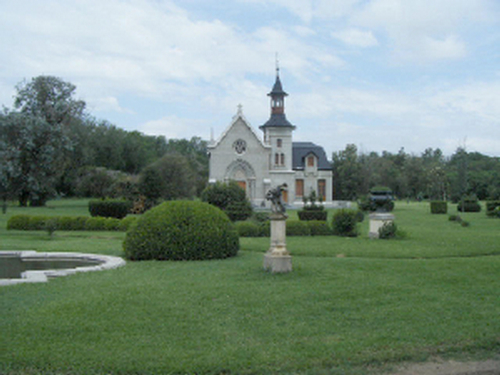
The chapel at Estancia El Durazno.

Father Antonio Cardarelli commissioned the construction of the city's principal Roman Catholic church, the Cathedral of the Immaculate Conception, built between 1883 and 1886. The National University of Río Cuarto, established in 1971, is located here. The city's football teams include Estudiantes and Atenas. Río Cuarto hosted the International Biology Olympiad in 2006.

The city is served by National Routes 8, 36, and 158, as well as Las Higueras Airport, inaugurated in 1954.

The cable-stayed Bicentennial Bridge was inaugurated in 2010. Some of the city's principal tourist draws include the Río Cuarto Racetrack, which hosts Turismo Carretera touring car racing events, and Estancia El Durazno, an estate built in 1917 belonging to former Governor Ambrosio Olmos. The Río Cuarto craters, a group of geologically unusual impact craters, are located nearby. The city's UN/LOCODE is ARRCU.

== University of Río Cuarto ==
The National University of Río Cuarto (UNRC) was founded on May 1, 1971, through a decree signed by President Alejandro Agustín Lanusse. This represented an acceleration of the Taquini Plan from the previous year, which aimed to extend higher education in Argentina by establishing national universities in more than the largest cities.

As of 2013, UNRC had a student body of approximately 14,000 and a teaching staff of around 2,000. Fast-forwarding to 2021, according to publications by the university itself, the student body consists of over 20,000 students distributed across five faculties: Agronomy and Veterinary Sciences; Economic Sciences; Exact, Physical-Chemical, and Natural Sciences; Humanities; and Engineering. In an external assessment by the national accreditation agency, there are approximately 55 undergraduate programs and 28 postgraduate programs. The university’s own publications also mention more than forty advanced-level programs—doctorates, master’s degrees, and specializations—coordinated by the faculties and the Graduate Studies office.

UNRC is engaged in several areas: research, extension, and community service. According to the university itself, there are more than 500 active research and extension projects on an annual basis, with the support of 1,100 teaching-research staff and over 400 research fellows distributed across 11 research institutes. This includes three UNRC institutes and eight joint institutes with CONICET.

The city is also home to Siglo 21 University, a private university that opened a branch campus in Río Cuarto in 2001; it forms part of a nationwide network of learning centers (over 320 “Centros de Apoyo Universitario” according to the university; reported as 350+ in 2019 press coverage).

== Climate ==
The climate is temperate, typical of the humid Pampas, with four marked seasons. Summers are warm with frequent thunderstorms; however, the heat is often "cut" by periods of southerly winds, so that the average high is a comfortable 29 °C, even though it can reach 38 °C.

Fall arrives slowly in March, and winter arrives in May with the first frosts. During the very dry winters, temperatures vary according to wind patterns: northwesterly, downsloping winds can bring temperatures of 25 °C (but with cool nights) even in midwinter, whereas southerly winds can leave daytime highs around 6 °C. Temperatures descend to -5 °C sometimes, and snow is uncommon, but not extremely so: in 2007, over 15 cm of snow covered the city, and temperatures plummeted to -11 °C, reaching highs of only 0 °C on one occasion.

Spring brings violent thunderstorms and wide temperature swings, with heat waves followed by frost or cool periods. In some years, the normal winter drought extends into the spring, posing a threat to agriculture; however, at 846 mm, Rio Cuarto's climate is generally favourable for crops.

Thunderstorms are very common during the summer, and can last for hours, and even days.

Climate data for Rio Cuarto (Las Higueras Airport) 1991–2020, extremes 1961–present
Month	Jan	Feb	Mar	Apr	May	Jun	Jul	Aug	Sep	Oct	Nov	Dec	Year
Record high °C (°F)	40.5 (104.9)	39.7 (103.5)	36.8 (98.2)	34.9 (94.8)	34.0 (93.2)	29.5 (85.1)	32.4 (90.3)	37.0 (98.6)	38.3 (100.9)	41.2 (106.2)	40.0 (104.0)	42.9 (109.2)	42.9 (109.2)
Mean daily maximum °C (°F)	29.1 (84.4)	27.7 (81.9)	26.3 (79.3)	22.9 (73.2)	19.1 (66.4)	16.3 (61.3)	15.7 (60.3)	18.6 (65.5)	21.1 (70.0)	23.9 (75.0)	26.8 (80.2)	29.0 (84.2)	23.0 (73.4)
Daily mean °C (°F)	23.0 (73.4)	21.7 (71.1)	20.0 (68.0)	16.5 (61.7)	12.8 (55.0)	9.7 (49.5)	8.8 (47.8)	11.2 (52.2)	14.0 (57.2)	17.2 (63.0)	20.3 (68.5)	22.5 (72.5)	16.5 (61.7)
Mean daily minimum °C (°F)	17.6 (63.7)	16.5 (61.7)	15.1 (59.2)	11.6 (52.9)	8.2 (46.8)	4.8 (40.6)	3.8 (38.8)	5.5 (41.9)	8.1 (46.6)	11.5 (52.7)	14.3 (57.7)	16.6 (61.9)	11.1 (52.0)
Record low °C (°F)	7.9 (46.2)	5.7 (42.3)	−0.1 (31.8)	−1.9 (28.6)	−4.3 (24.3)	−7.6 (18.3)	−10.6 (12.9)	−5.0 (23.0)	−3.1 (26.4)	−0.5 (31.1)	0.0 (32.0)	4.5 (40.1)	−10.6 (12.9)
Average precipitation mm (inches)	135.4 (5.33)	104.7 (4.12)	102.0 (4.02)	67.0 (2.64)	29.2 (1.15)	7.7 (0.30)	9.0 (0.35)	10.9 (0.43)	35.0 (1.38)	81.0 (3.19)	127.0 (5.00)	129.6 (5.10)	838.5 (33.01)
Average precipitation days (≥ 0.1 mm)	9.3	7.8	7.7	6.7	4.3	2.4	2.5	2.0	4.7	8.7	9.6	9.7	75.4
Average snowy days	0.0	0.0	0.0	0.0	0.0	0.1	0.3	0.1	0.1	0.0	0.0	0.0	0.4
Average relative humidity (%)	66.7	71.3	72.8	71.5	73.3	69.9	64.8	57.6	56.5	60.8	59.4	60.4	65.4
Mean monthly sunshine hours	263.5	220.4	220.1	177.0	158.1	144.0	158.1	186.0	198.0	210.8	231.0	260.4	2,427.4
Mean daily sunshine hours	8.5	7.8	7.1	5.9	5.1	4.8	5.1	6.0	6.6	6.8	7.7	8.4	6.6
Percentage possible sunshine	52.6	49.6	51.9	49.7	48.6	45.0	52.9	53.3	51.4	43.0	44.6	48.0	49.6
Source 1: Servicio Meteorológico Nacional (percent sun 1991–2000)
Source 2: Secretaria de Mineria

== Twin towns – sister cities ==
Río Cuarto is twinned with:

- Asunción, Paraguay.
