= Taquini =

Taquini is an Italian surname. Notable people with the surname include:

- Alberto Carlos Taquini (1905–1998), Argentine cardiologist
- Alberto Taquini (born 1935), Argentine biochemist

== See also ==
- Taquini Plan
