= Celeste Sagui =

Argentine-American physicist

Maria Celeste Sagui is an Argentine-American physicist whose research involves the development of software for the large-scale simulation of molecular dynamics for biomolecules, as a coauthor of the AMBER package. She is a professor of physics at North Carolina State University.

== Education and career ==
Sagui has a licenciate from the National University of San Luis in Argentina, and a 1995 PhD from the University of Toronto in Canada.

She became a postdoctoral researcher at McGill University and at the National Institute of Environmental Health Sciences before joining North Carolina State University as an assistant professor in 2000. She has been a full professor there since 2009.

== Recognition ==
Sagui was named as a Fellow of the American Physical Society (APS) in 2013, after a nomination from the APS Division of Chemical Physics, "for her fundamental contributions to the field of computational biophysics and statistical mechanics, her development of algorithms for simulating long-range electrostatic forces and free energies, and her insights into the understanding of biomolecular structure and nanoscale growth phenomena".
