= Intersecciones en Antropología =

Argentinian academic journal

- Discipline: Archaeology, anthropology
- Language: Spanish
- Edited by: Mariela E. Gonzalez

Publication details
- History: 2000-present
- Publisher: Universidad Nacional del Centro de la Provincia de Buenos Aires (Argentina)
- Frequency: Biannually
- Open access: Yes
- License: CC BY-NC-SA 4.0
- Impact factor: 0.513 (2019)

Standard abbreviations
- ISO 4: Intersecc. Antropol.

Indexing
- ISSN: 1666-2105 (print); 1850-373X (web)
- OCLC no.: 909884285

Links
- Journal homepage; Online access; Online archive

Intersecciones en Antropología (English: Intersections in Anthropology) is a biannual peer-reviewed open access academic journal established in 2000 and published by the Universidad Nacional del Centro de la Provincia de Buenos Aires. It covers work on archeology, bioarcheology, and related disciplines. The editor-in-chief is Mariela E. Gonzalez (National University of Central Buenos Aires).

== Abstracting and indexing ==
The journal is abstracted and indexed in:

- Anthropological Literature
- Arts and Humanities Citation Index
- EBSCO databases
- Scopus
- Social Sciences Citation Index
- The Zoological Record

According to the Journal Citation Reports, the journal has a 2019 impact factor of 0.513.
