= Tacchini =

Tacchini or Tacchino is an Italian language surname, which means "turkey". It may refer to:

- Carlo Tacchini (born 1995), Italian Olympic canoeist
- Gabriel Tacchino (1934–2023), French pianist
- Pietro Tacchini (1838–1905), Italian astronomer
- Roberto Tacchini (born 1940), Italian football player
- Sergio Tacchini (born 1938), Italian fashion designer

== See also ==
- 8006 Tacchini, minor planet
- Tacchini (crater) on the Moon
- Taquini, similar surname
