= Saúl Antonio Tovar =

Argentine philosopher and humanist

- Born: 1938
- Died: 2006 (aged 67–68)
- Citizenship: Argentine
- Education: National University of Córdoba
- Occupation(s): Philosopher and Hellenist.

Saúl Antonio Tovar (1938—2006) was a philosopher and humanist from Argentina. He studied philosophy at the National University of Córdoba where he became a doctor in 1970.

== Early life and education ==
Tovar pursued studies in Hispanic and Italian philology in Madrid and Perugia from 1962 to 1965. He later studied philosophy at the National University of Córdoba, where he earned his doctorate in 1970.

In 1972, he became a research fellow at the Aristotle University of Thessaloniki, and from 1975 to 1978, he worked with the Greek Ministry of Foreign Affairs. In 1980, Tovar continued his studies of Greek language, history, and culture at Harvard University as a "Visiting Scholar."

== Academic career ==
Tovar served as a professor of philosophy at several institutions:

- The Institute of Teachers of Posadas (1964–1968)
- The National University of Córdoba (1968–1972)
- The National University of Río Cuarto (1973–1975)

== Contributions to Greek Philology ==
Tovar's studies on Greek philology were characterized by his defense of the uninterrupted continuity of the Hellenic language and the unity of Greek culture throughout its historical evolution. His work helped dispel misconceptions and prejudices about the Greek language that had existed since the time of Erasmus of Rotterdam.
