= National University of Central Buenos Aires =

- Universidad Nacional del Centro de la provincia deBuenos Aires
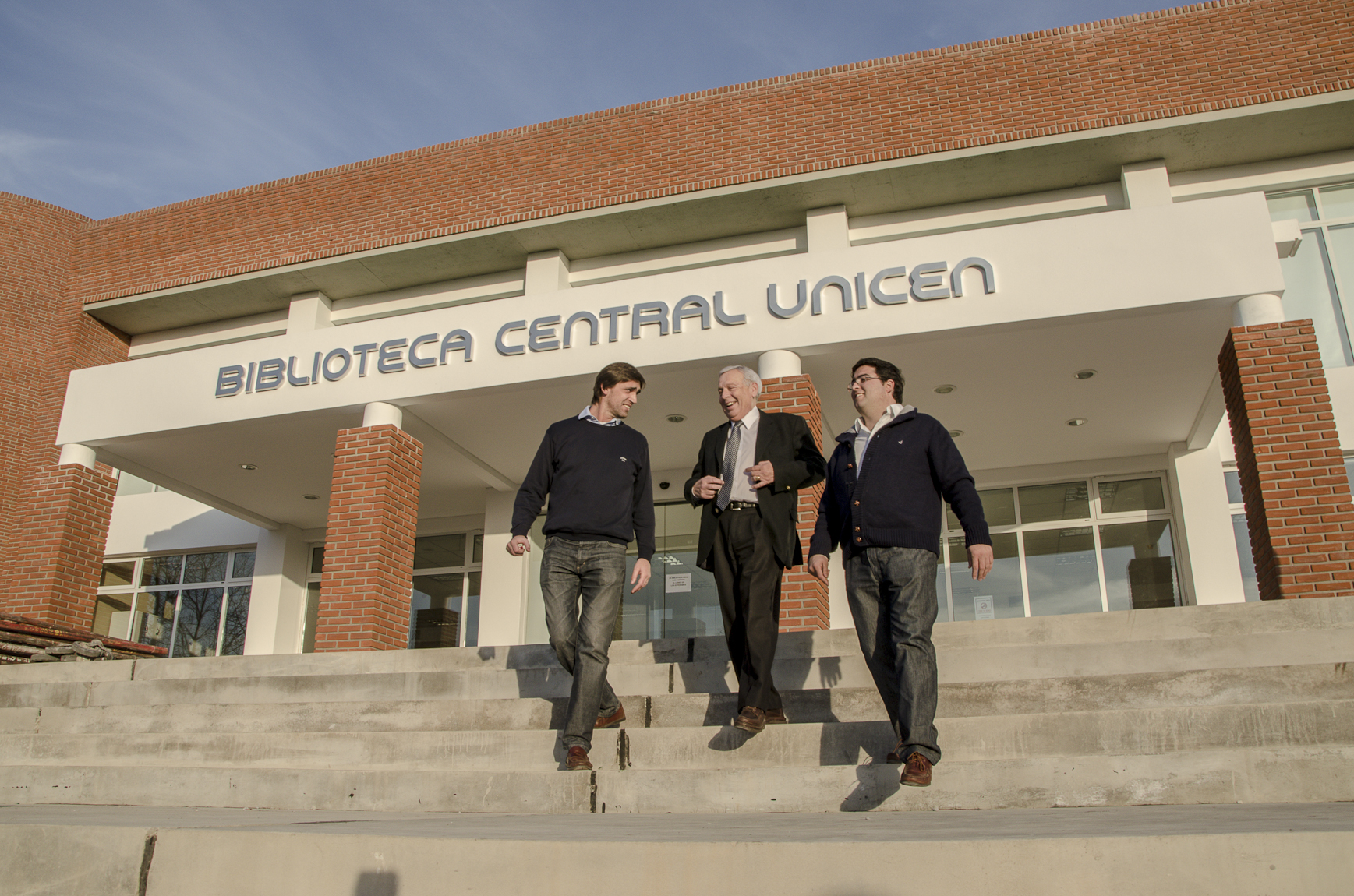
- Biblioteca Central UNICEN
- Motto: Truth is obtained by effort
- Type: Public
- Established: 1974
- Chancellor: Marcelo Aba
- Students: 11,142
- Location: Tandil, Buenos Aires Province, Argentina; 37°19′44″S 59°08′18″W
- Campus: Tandil, Azul, Olavarría, Quequén
- Website: www.unicen.edu.ar

The National University of Central Buenos Aires (UNICEN; Spanish: Universidad Nacional del Centro de Buenos Aires) is a public institution of higher learning located in Tandil, a city in the central region of Buenos Aires Province, Argentina. It was founded in 1974 as part of University of Buenos Aires Professor Alberto Taquini's plan to geographically diversify Argentina's National University system.

Established with the unification of a private school and a campus of the National University of the South, the university includes 10 schools offering 21 undergraduate, 58 graduate, and 19 post-graduate degrees. It maintains secondary campuses in Azul, Olavarría and Quequén.

In 2022, the British specialized company Quacquarelli Symonds ranked UNICEN at 7th place in Argentina, 601st overall across the world.
