= Edgardo M. Latrubesse =

Geologist

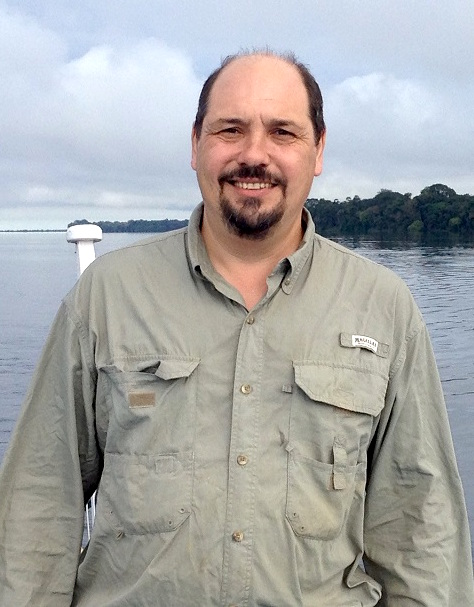
- Edgardo M. Latrubesse in the field
- Born: 1965 (age 60–61); Pergamino, Argentina
- Education: National University of San Luis, Argentina
- Occupation: Geologist
- Known for: research on the impacts of human activities on geosystems, global change environments
- Awards: 2005 Augusto Gonzalez de Linares International Environment Award

Edgardo Manuel Latrubesse (born 1965 in Pergamino, Argentina) is an Argentine geologist.

== Education and career ==
Latrubesse was born in 1965 in Pergamino, Argentina. He received his BSc and PhD both from the National University of San Luis, Argentina. He completed his PhD in 1989.

Following his PhD, he worked for over ten years in Brazil, at the Federal University of Amazonas, the Federal University of Acre, and the Federal University of Goias. He moved to the Universidad Nacional de La Plata, Argentina in 2006, then on to the University of Texas, Austin in 2009. He was appointed to the chair of Raymond Dickson Centennial Professor at the University of Texas at Austin in 2017. He moved in 2018 to the Earth Observatory of Singapore, Nanyang Technological University. After resigning for unrelated reasons from his University of Texas appointment in 2018, he was found by a UT internal investigation to have sexually harassed another faculty member there, and was barred from further work at the university.

== Research ==
Latrubesse's research is on fluvial, tropical, and aeolian geomorphology, quaternary geology, impacts of human activities on geosystems, multidisciplinary environmental research, hazards, and global change environments.

== Awards and honors ==
Latrubesse is the recipient of the 2005 Augusto Gonzalez de Linares International Environment Awards.
