= Taquini Plan =

Decentralization of Argentina's universities

The Taquini Plan (Plan de Creación de Nuevas Universidades, or Plan Taquini) was a project for the restructuring of higher education in Argentina proposed by biochemist and academic Dr. Alberto Taquini in 1968. Implemented in 1970, it resulted in a significant decentralization of the Argentine national university system.

== Overview ==
=== Proposal ===
First proposed in an academic colloquium held at the University of La Plata's mountain retreat, Samay Huasi, on November 16–18, 1968, Taquini's program called for an unprecedented expansion in the number of national universities, which at the time totaled only ten. Numerous private universities, as well as public provincial universities existed; but the former were not affordable to the majority of prospective students, and the latter were often ill-equipped and lacked the prestige a national university degree bestowed on the student. Distance and its resulting costs also hampered accessibility to a university education, since (with the exception of the UTN, which maintained campuses nearly nationwide) the ten existing national universities were distributed among but seven of the nation's 24 districts (22 provinces, a territory, and a federal district). Leading Argentine university leaders in the past, notably La Plata University President Joaquín V. González and University of Tucumán founder Juan Bautista Terán, had advocated a more decentralized system as early as the 1910s.

=== Background ===
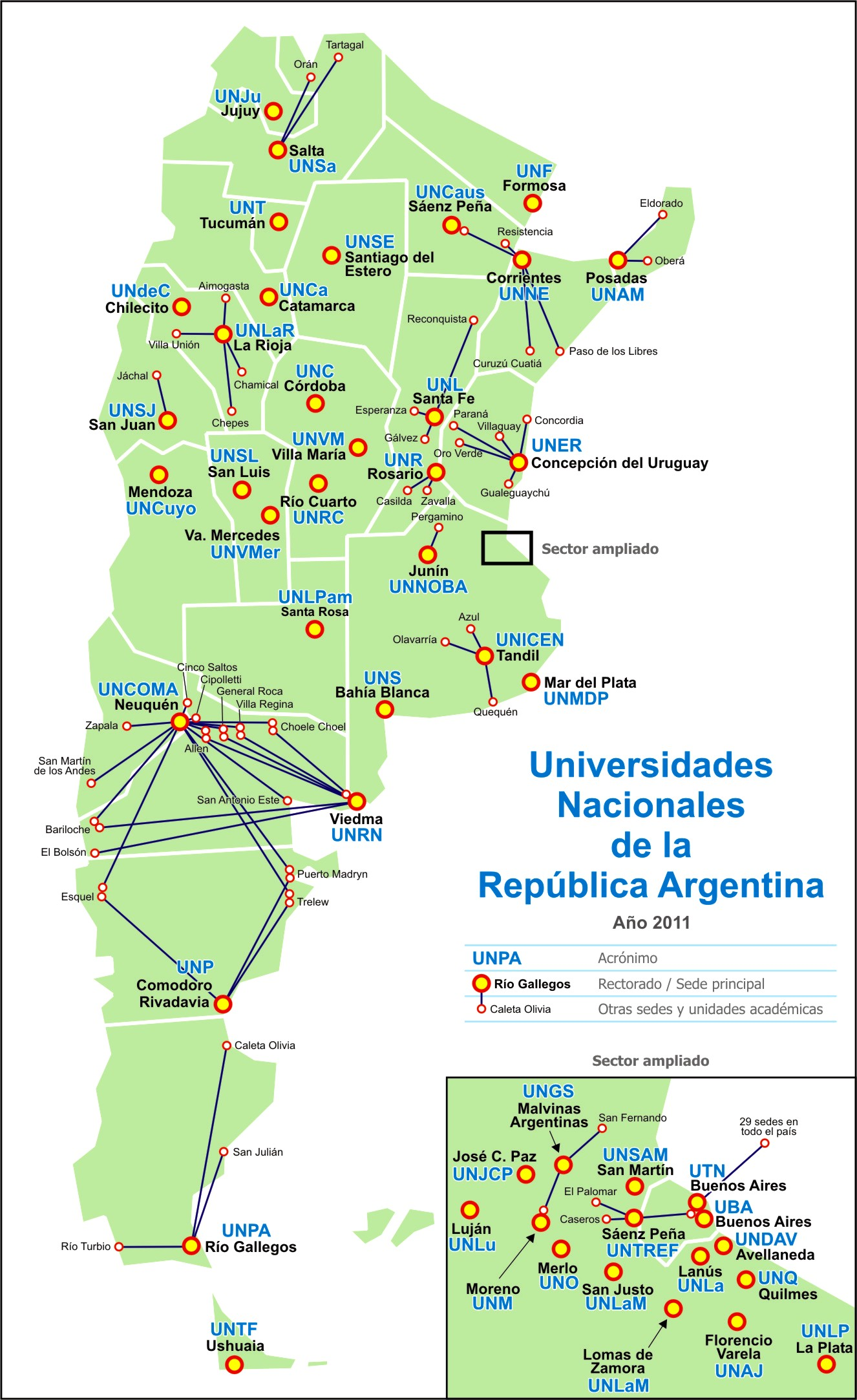
Map of the Argentine national university system. Main campuses are displayed in buttons and bold face, and satellite campuses in dots.

Some decentralization had been achieved with President Juan Perón's establishment of the UTN's predecessor, the National Worker's University, with scattered campuses, as well as two other national universities; another institution, the National University of Rosario, had been formed from the Rosario campus of the National University of the Littoral just months before the Taquini proposal.

Revisions made to the 1884 Law 1420 of Common Education by President Pedro Aramburu's Law 6403 of 1955 further diversified higher education by allowing private (mainly parochial) colleges to issue official degrees directly rather than only through a public university, leading to the establishment of the Argentine Catholic University and other Roman Catholic-sponsored colleges.

University enrollment in Argentina had expanded from 49,000 in 1947 to 238,000 in 1969, and because the national university system absorbed most of this growth (with 200,000 students), decompressing strained public university campuses became a national development priority. Taquini also addressed development policy needs by proposing that new universities in the least developed provinces (in the north), or in thinly-populated ones (in Patagonia) focus curricula on fields related to their respective province's most productive (or most potentially productive) economic activities. This proposal was also the most cost-effective in the plan, as many of the new universities would incorporate provincial universities already specializing in degrees related to their provinces' leading natural resource sectors.

Political concerns were at least an important as socio-economic ones in the plan's consideration. The dictatorship installed in 1966 had been repressive of dissent from its earliest days, ordering mass detentions and dismissals of university faculty and intervention against left-wing trade unions. These policies led to spiraling labor and student unrest, and by 1969, riots such as the Rosariazo and the Cordobazo. These incidents bolstered Taquini's call for decentralizing the strained system, and his plan gained support from State Intelligence, whose reports confirmed that crowded campuses and the long distances from home endured by most university students were contributing to tensions.

=== Implementation ===
Taquini's proposal was endorsed by the National Research Council, CONICET. It was further advanced by developments in France, where student upheaval in 1968 led to the University of Paris' subdivision into 13 autonomous entities in 1970. Officially submitted on May 23, 1970, to the Council of University Rectors as the "Program for the Adjustment of the Argentine University System to the Needs of National Development," Education Minister José Luis Cantini and President Roberto Levingston signed the proposal into law on November 9, 1970. The first new institution established under its auspices, the National University of Río Cuarto, was founded in May 1971, and Taquini's closest collaborators in the policy's draft, Dr. Sadi Rife and Marcelo Zapiola, were named Rectors of the first two new universities: Río Cuarto and the National University of Comahue.

=== Results ===
The number of national universities expanded from 10 to 23 by 1973 (and to 47 by 2010). The system's enrollment continued to rise, as well, growing from 202,000 in 1970 (85% of the total) to 481,000 in 1975 (90% of the total). The Taquini Plan failed to geographically diversify enrollment as quickly as it did the system itself, however, since the new universities generally remained less prestigious than the older establishments. The system's total enrollment reached 1,283,000 in 2006, of which 49% were enrolled in the universities of Buenos Aires, Córdoba, La Plata, or Rosario. Ballooning enrollment prompted the enactment of yearly quotas after the March 1976 coup (which caused enrollment in the system to fall by one third), though these were lifted with the election of President Raúl Alfonsín in 1983. Enrollment doubled to 661,000 by 1989, further straining facilities.

The plan's emphasis on encouraging the pursuit of degrees according to economic and market needs was only partially successful. Degrees in the Humanities and Social Sciences (including Law) remained around half of the total, despite accounting for 3% of the labor market demand, while degrees in applied sciences were 30% of the total, while commanding three-fourths of the labor market needs; medical degrees were balanced at around 20% of degrees and demand. Nor did the plan succeed in curbing high attrition rates, as Taquini believed that shorter distances from students' families might do.

Taquini's broader goals were largely met, however. Total university enrollment, including 50 private institutions and four belonging to the Argentine Armed Forces, reached 1.58 million in 2006, of which the proportion attending the "big four" decreased from 67% in 1968 to 40% in 2006, and the nation's 47 national universities are distributed in every province. The plan's call for increased funding was also met, albeit belatedly: federal budgets for higher education increased steadily after 1985, growing from US$1 billion (in constant 2001 dollars) to over US$4.3 billion in 2008.

A complementary proposal, calling for the creation of a system of national community colleges associated with each one's nearest national university, was proposed by Taquini in 1989, and included as Article 22 of the Higher Education Law signed by President Carlos Menem in 1994.
