= National University of Mar del Plata =

Coordinates: 38.0239°S 57.5658°W

- Universidad Nacional de Mar del Plata
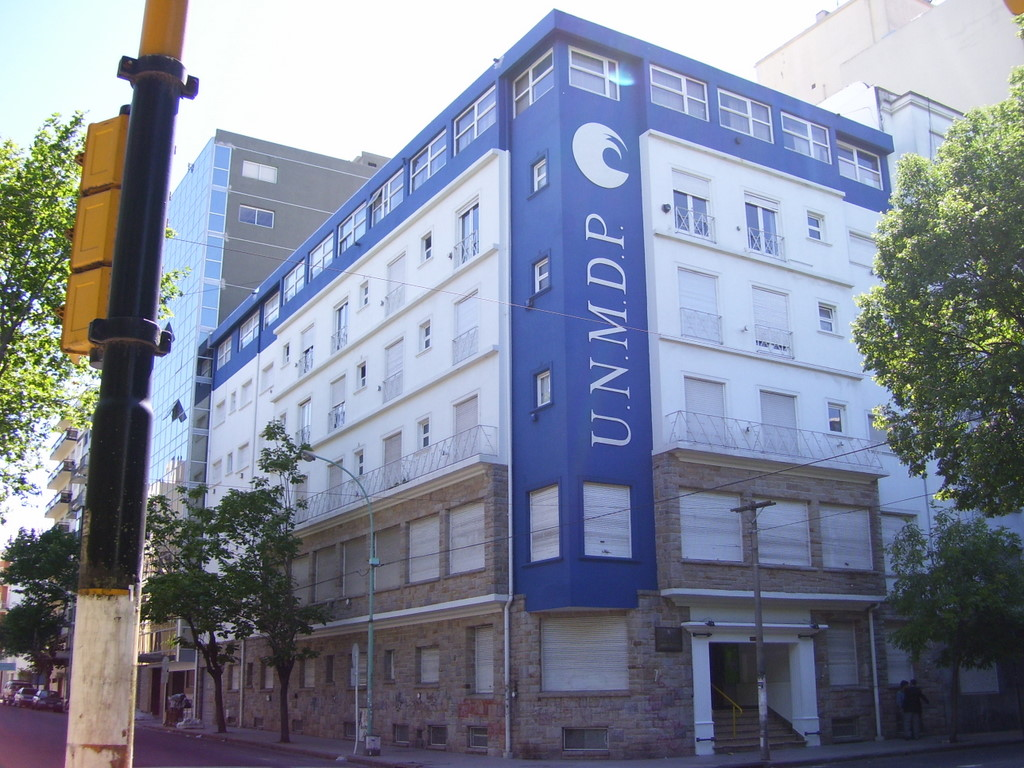
- Rectorate of the National University of Mar del Plata
- Former name: Universidad de la Provincia de Buenos Aires (University of the Province of Buenos Aires)
- Type: Public
- Established: 1962; 64 years ago
- Rector: Mónica Mabel Biasone
- Academic staff: 4,734
- Students: 55414 (2025)
- Location: Mar del Plata, Buenos Aires Province, Argentina
- Campus: Complejo Universitario Manuel Belgrano
- Website: mdp.edu.ar

The National University of Mar del Plata (Spanish: Universidad Nacional de Mar del Plata, UNMdP) is an Argentine national university in the city of Mar del Plata, on the Atlantic coast.

The institution was established in 1962 as the Universidad de la Provincia de Buenos Aires (University of the Province of Buenos Aires). The university acquired its current name in 1975, when under the auspices of the Taquini Plan the Argentine government took over its administration and merged it with the Universidad Católica Stella Maris (Catholic University Stella Maris).

The UNMdP currently includes nine faculties (Architecture, Urbanism and Design, Agricultural Sciences, Economics and Social Sciences, Natural Sciences, Health Sciences and Social Work, Law, Humanities, Engineering, Psychology and Medicine). It offers 59 graduate programmes, 15 pre-graduate programmes, and 68 post-graduate programmes.

== Graduate programmes ==
| Degree awarded (Professorship/Licentiate/Other) | Field of Studies / Discipline | Duration (in years) |
Faculty of Architecture, Urban Planning and Design
| Architect | Architecture | 6 |
| Industrial Designer | Industrial design | 5 |
| Associate Degree in Cultural Management (Distance Learning) | Cultural Management | 2½ |
| Bachelor's Degree in Cultural Management (Curricular Complementation Cycle) | Cultural Management | 2 |
| Associate Degree in Audiovisual Communication | Audiovisual Communication | 3 |
Faculty of Economic and Social Sciences
| Bachelor's Degree in Economics Education | Economics | 4 |
| Bachelor's Degree in Economics | Economics | 5 |
| Public Accountant | Accountancy | 5 |
| Associate Degree in Accountancy | Accountancy | 3 |
| Bachelor's Degree in Business Administration | Administration | 5 |
| Bachelor's Degree in Tourism | Tourism | 5 |
| Associate Degree in Tourism | Tourism | 3 |
| Associate Degree in International Trade | International Trade | 3 |
| Associate Degree in Marketing | Marketing | 3 |
| Associate Degree in Digital Journalism | Journalism | 3 |
Faculty of Exact and Natural Sciences
| Biochemist | Biochemistry | 6 |
| Bachelor's Degree in Biological Sciences Teaching | Biological Sciences | 4 |
| Bachelor's Degree in Biological Sciences | Biological Sciences | 5½ |
| Bachelor's Degree in Mathematics Teaching | Mathematics | 4 |
| Bachelor's Degree in Mathematics | Mathematics | 5 |
| Bachelor's Degree in Physics Education | Physics | 4 |
| Bachelor's Degree in Physics | Physics | 5 |
| Bachelor's Degree in Chemistry Education | Chemistry | 4 |
| Bachelor's Degree in Chemestry | Chemistry | 5 |
| Associate Degree in Data Science | Data Science | 3 |
Faculty of Agricultural Sciences
| Agronomic Engineer | Agronomy | 5 |
| Associate Degree in Beverage Science | Beverage Science | 2½ |
| Bachelor's Degree in Food Science and Technology | Food science and Technology | 4 |
| Bachelor's Degree in Animal Husbandry | Animal husbandry | 4 |
| Bachelor's Degree in Plants Production | Agriculture | 4 |
| Associate Degree in Intensive Plants Productions (Distance Learning) | Agriculture | 2½ |
Faculty of Health Sciences and Social Work
| Licentiate in Nursing | Nursing | 5 |
| Licentiate in Social Work | Social Work | 5 |
| Licentiate in Occupational Therapy | Occupational therapy | 5 |
Faculty of Law
| Lawyer | Law | 5 |
| Real Estate Auctioneering and Brokerage (Distance Learning) | Real Estate Auctioneering and Brokerage | 3 |
| Associate Degree in Judicial Administration | Judicial Administration | 2 |
| Associate Degree in Data Protection | Data Protection | 2 |
Faculty of Humanities
| Bachelor's Degree in Anthropology | Anthropologic Sciences | 4 |
| Associate Degree in Anthropology | Anthropologic Sciences | 3 |
| Bachelor's Degree in Library Science and Documentation | Library science and Documentation | 5 |
| Bachelor's Degree in Library Science and Documentation Teaching | Library science and Documentation | 5 |
| Bachelor's Degree in School Librarianship | Library science and Documentation | 3 |
| Bachelor's Degree in School Librarianship (Distance Learning) | Library science and Documentation | 3 |
| Bachelor's Degree Library and Information Science | Library science and Documentation | 3 |
| Bachelor's Degree in Political Science | Political science | 5 |
| Bachelor's Degree in Philosophy | Philosophy | 5 |
| Bachelor's Degree in Philosophy Teaching | Philosophy | 4 |
| Bachelor's Degree in Geography | Geography | 5 |
| Bachelor's Degree in Geography Teaching | Geography | 5 |
| Bachelor's Degree in History | History | 5 |
| Bachelor's Degree in History Teaching | History | 4 |
| Bachelor's Degree in English Studies | Modern Languages Studies | 5 |
| Bachelor's Degree in English Education | Modern Languages Studies | 4 |
| Public Translation Degree in English | Modern Languages Studies | 4 |
| Bachelor's Degree in Italian Studies Education | Modern Languages Studies | 4 |
| Bachelor's Degree in Literature | Spanish Philology and Literature | 5 |
| Bachelor's Degree in Literature Teaching | Spanish Philology and Literature | 4 |
| Bachelor's Degree in Sociology | Sociology | 5 |
| Bachelor's Degree in Sociology Education | Sociology | 4 |
| Bachelor's Degree in Educational Sciences | Educational sciences | 5 |
| Bachelor's Degree in Educational Sciences Education | Educational sciences | 4 |
Faculty of Engineering
| Electric Engineer | Electric Engineering | 5 |
| Electro-mechanic Engineer | Electro-mechanic Engineering | 5 |
| Electronic Engineer | Electronic engineering | 5 |
| Food Engineer | Food engineering | 5 |
| Computational Engineer | Computational engineering | 5 |
| Informatics Engineer | Informatics Engineering | 5 |
| Industrial Engineer | Industrial engineering | 5 |
| Material Engineer | Material Engineering | 5 |
| Mechanical Engineer | Mechanical Engineering | 5 |
| Chemical Engineer | Chemical engineering | 5 |
Faculty of Psychology
| Licentiate in Psychology | Psychology | 5 |
Faculty of Medicine
| Medicine | Medicine | 6 |

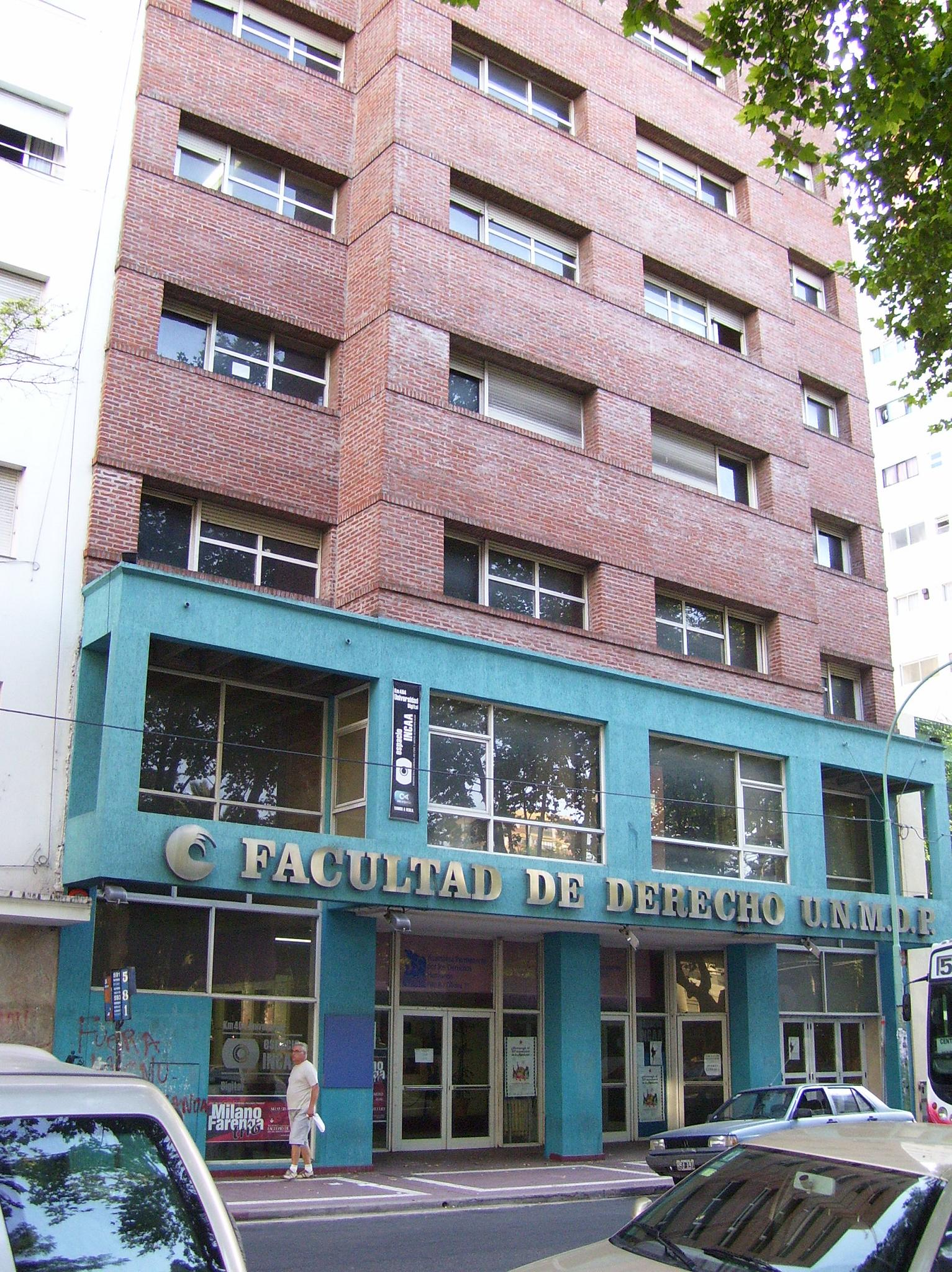
Law School of the University of Mar del Plata

== See also ==
- Education in Argentina
