= Las Higueras Airport =

Airport in Argentina

Las Higueras Airport Area De Material Airport
- IATA: RCU; ICAO: SAOC

Summary
- Airport type: Military/Public
- Operator: Aeropuertos Argentina 2000
- Serves: Río Cuarto, Argentina
- Location: Las Higueras
- Elevation AMSL: 1,381 ft (421 m)
- Coordinates: 33°05′10″S 64°15′41″W

Map
- Location of the airport in Argentina

Runways
Direction	Length		Surface
Direction	m	ft	Surface
05/23	2,265	7,431	Asphalt
18/36	2,075	6,808	Asphalt
- Sources: WAD Google Maps SkyVector

Las Higueras Airport (IATA: RCU, ICAO: SAOC) is an airport serving Río Cuarto, a city in the Córdoba Province of Argentina. The airport is 7 kilometres (4 mi) northeast of Río Cuarto, near the suburb of Las Higueras.

Runway lengths do not include blast pads of 250 metres (820 ft) on Runway 05 and 125 metres (410 ft) on Runway 23.

The Rio Cuarto VOR (Ident: TRC) and non-directional beacon (Ident: R) are located on the field.

== Airlines and destinations ==
Airlines	Destinations
Aerolíneas Argentinas	Buenos Aires–Aeroparque

== Accidents and incidents ==
- 17 July 1958: An Argentine Air Force Douglas C-47A, tail number T-22, crashed upon takeoff following an engine failure.
- 5 May 1969: An ANAC Douglas R4D-1, registration LQ-IPC, crashed on landing at the airport, killing all 11 occupants aboard.

== See also ==
- List of airports in Argentina
- Transport in Argentina
