= Argentine Federation of Associations of Teachers of English =

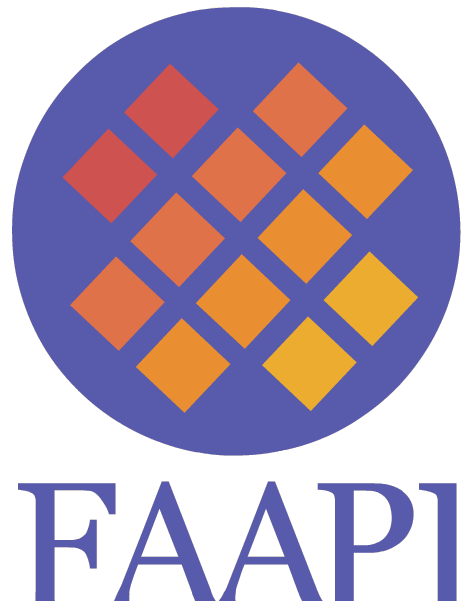
FAAPI's logo

The Argentine Federation of Associations of Teachers of English (FAAPI) is a registered non-profit organization founded in 1971. Through 27 regional associations of teachers of English in Argentina, FAAPI affiliates all certified Teachers of English as a Foreign Language holding degrees granted by universities and other teachers’ training colleges recognized by the National Ministry of Culture and Education. FAAPI’s goal is to encourage continuous professional development among its members. FAAPI is also an associate member of IATEFL (International Association of Teachers of English as a Foreign Language).

== Associations ==
FAAPI currently has 21 associations of teachers of English from different parts of Argentina. Each organizes a range of local activities such as workshops, conferences, lectures, or webinars. The delegates of the local associations vote during the annual general meeting to form FAAPI’s Board of Directors

== Conferences ==
Each year, one of the regional associations, together with the board of directors, organizes an annual three-day conference. Researchers, teachers, teacher trainers, and students from Argentina and other countries attend plenaries, semi-plenaries, workshops, research reports, and state-of-the-art reports in this conference. There are also commercial presentations.

Year	Location	Theme
2017	Posadas	Revitalising ELT through authenticity: Practices, contents and materials
2016	San Juan	ELT as a multidisciplinary endeavour: Growing through collaboration
2015	Córdoba	EFL classrooms in the new millennium: Local developments and global concerns
2014	Santiago del Estero	EFL teaching and learning in the post-method era
2013	Buenos Aires	Roots and routes in language education
2012	San Martín de los Andes	Research on motivation and autonomy in ELT
2011	Tucumán	Communicative language teaching & learning revisited
2010	Córdoba	EFL and art. Learning English with all our senses
2009	Bahía Blanca	Teachers in action: making the most of the latest trends in the classroom
2008	Santiago del Estero	Using the language to learn. Learning to use the language
2007	San Salvador de Jujuy	Cultural awareness in ELT
2006	Rosario	Multiple literacies: beyond the four skills
2005	Santa Fe	Towards the knowledge society: making EFL education relevant

== Publications ==
FAAPI leads the Argentinian Journal of Applied Linguistics (AJAL). This open-access e-journal is aimed at teachers and researchers interested in sharing their expertise, experience, and concerns in the fields of Applied Linguistics and English Language Teaching. AJAL welcomes original research articles, state-of-the-art articles, literature reviews, materials reviews, and classroom accounts which focus on practical aspects.

Also, after each annual congress, a summary of the most salient presentations is published. They are available free of charge on FAAPI's Website
