= University of the Latin American Educational Center =

The University of the Latin American Educational Center is a for-profit private university based in Rosario, Argentina. Established in 1993, it was the first Methodist-related university in Argentina, and the first independent degree-granting university in Rosario.

The origin of this institution can be traced back to the arrival of two missionary teachers sent from the United States by the Methodist Episcopal Church to open an elementary school for girls, the North American School (Colegio Norteamericano), in 1875, under the sponsorship of President Domingo Faustino Sarmiento. Junior and senior high schools were added later, and in the 1950s the Colegio became coeducational.

UCEL belongs to the International Association of Methodist-Related Schools, Colleges, and Universities (IAMSCU). It is also connected with the General Board of Higher Education and Ministry of the United Methodist Church in Nashville, Tennessee, U.S.
