= Catholic Church–state relations in Argentina =

The first conflicts between the Roman Catholic Church and the Argentine government can be traced to the ideas of the May Revolution of 1810. The Tribunal of the Inquisition was suppressed in the territories of the United Provinces of the River Plate on 23 March 1813, and on 4 June the General Assembly declared the state "independent from any ecclesiastical authorities existing outside its territory".

The framers of the 1853 Constitution, who were in many cases influenced by Freemasonry, found a middle way between an officially Catholic country and a secular society, by allowing religious freedom while keeping economic support for the Church, and employing the patronage system, by which the President selected triplets of bishop candidates that the Pope could approve.

This system was abolished in 1966, during the dictatorial rule of Juan Carlos Onganía, and replaced by a Concordat which gave the Vatican the attribution of appointing and removing bishops, leaving the President only with the right to object the appointments. In the 1994 constitutional reform the Concordat was awarded the rank of international treaty and thus given priority over national laws, although Congress is still allowed to reformulate it. The same reform eliminated the constitutional requirement for the President to be a Roman Catholic.

The protocol of the Argentine government has always been influenced by the Catholic Church. Bishops often have a place along ministers, governors and other officials in patriotic ceremonies. On the celebration of the May Revolution, the president along with their spouse and ministers is expected to attend the Te Deum celebrated by the Archbishop of Buenos Aires.

== Early times ==
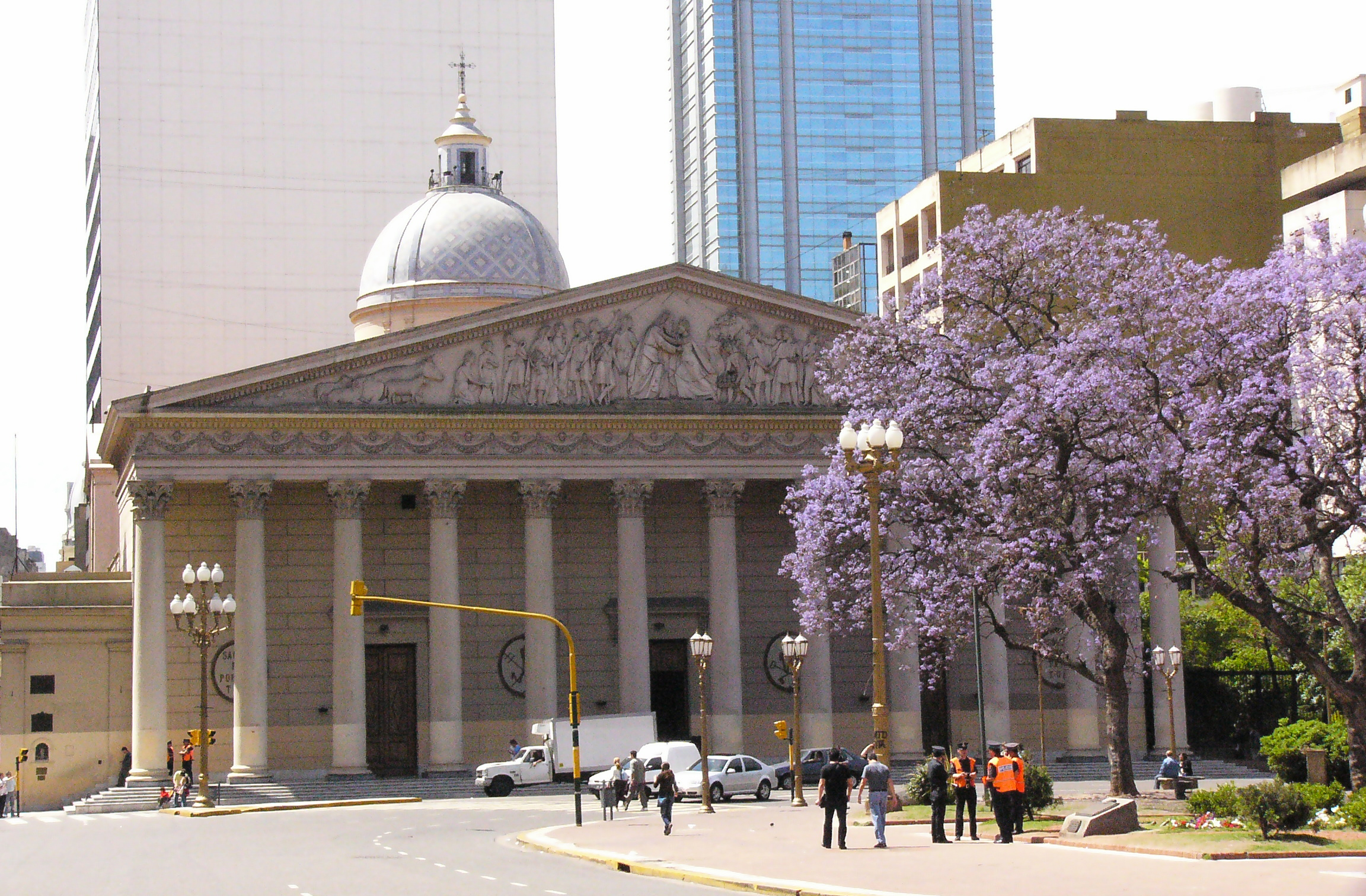
Metropolitan Cathedral of Buenos Aires, Argentina.

During the first twenty years after the May Revolution, the new state did not establish official diplomatic relations with the Vatican. The Papacy did not wish to create a conflict with the Spanish Crown by showing support for the South American revolution; in 1825, Pope Leo XII denounced it. During the government of Martín Rodríguez (1820–1824), there was a (failed) project to transfer the clergy to state control and abolish tithing in favour of state financial backing for the Church.

Juan Manuel de Rosas destroyed the possibility of re-establishing relations when, in 1837, he dictated that no civil or ecclesiastic authority in Buenos Aires Province must acknowledge or obey pontifical documents dated after 1810-05-25 without an authorization granted by the foreign relations department.

After Rosas's fall, Justo José de Urquiza proposed the Holy See to create a diocese of the littoral provinces, to avoid the intervention of the bishopric of Buenos Aires, but the Vatican did not accept the Concordat proposed in 1857.

== 1880s ==
Possibly the first major conflict between the Argentine State and the Catholic "Church" arose in 1884, when President Julio Argentino Roca supported Law 1420, dictating compulsory universal secular education, and the law of civil marriage. The opposition of the Church led to the expulsion of the Nuncio, the removal of dissident bishops, and a breakup of diplomatic relations with the Vatican, which were re-established during Roca's second term.

The civil marriage law was approved in 1889 under the presidency of Miguel Juárez Celman. The Archbishop of Buenos Aires, Federico Aneiros, sent a document to the priests instructing them to explain church attendants that civil marriage was simply concubinage (in its modern sense, cohabitation). The Vatican sent instructions to resist the law; the Capitular Vicar of Córdoba told people to ignore the law, and several priests who had administered the sacrament to couples married under the civil law were punished.

== Conservative period ==
In October 1934 the International Eucharistic Congress was held in Buenos Aires. The Papal Legate was the then-Secretary of the Vatican, Cardinal Eugenio Pacelli (who would become Pope Pius XII in 1939). After the Congress, Argentina was granted a cardinal and three new archbishops, which showed the local and Vatican concern about the advancement of National Socialism. With this sensitive topic in hand, the Church pressured the government on the issue of re-establishing the possibility of religious teaching in public schools. The conservative Agustín Pedro Justo administration lent ears to these requests.

== Peronism ==
The government of Juan Perón (1946–1955) was one of changing relationships between the Church and the State. At first, the new Peronist movement was linked to the Armed Forces. The Army and the Church considered themselves barriers against the ideologies of Socialism and Communism. The Church also supported a doctrine of "social justice" that shared with Peronism the idea of a State that mediates in class conflicts and evens out social inequalities.

However, some factions of the Church objected Perón's "statism", that is, the intervention of the national government in private society, sometimes invading the sphere of influence of the Church, as in the case of welfare plans and public education, the latter being the most contentious issue. By a law dictated in 1943 during the previous dictatorial government, public schools were forced to provide religious education classes. In 1946, the Argentine Senate approved a legal re-affirmation of all the decrees passed by the military junta. This law was debated in the less docile Chamber of Deputies, and was finally passed thanks to the vote of the Peronists, who submitted to the will of the Executive Branch. The arguments presented were nationalistic and anti-liberal, identifying Argentine nationality with the deep Catholicism of the motherland, Spain, and also emphasizing religion as a means to create a personal conscience and an ordered society.

The religious education law, however, limited the powers of the Church: teachers, curricular contents and textbooks were designated by the State, after consultations with the Church if need be. Besides this, the rest of the school subjects were independent of religious influence, and therefore followed the secular tradition of Argentine education. The Peronist government also introduced subjects such as sports, hygiene and sanitary care, which the Church deemed excessively concerned with bodily matters. Finally, education became a vehicle for quasi-religious propaganda for the personality cult of the president and his wife Eva. In June 1950 Perón appointed Armando Méndez San Martín, an anticlerical (accused by the Church of being a Freemason), as Minister of Education.

"Democratic" Catholics were opposed to a full integration of religion and State, but rather preferred a separation between State and Church that granted all schools (public and private, including confessional ones) to receive state funding. These Catholics were in the minority and had no representation before Peronism.

During his second term, Perón resented the Vatican's aspiration to promote the formation of Catholic-based political parties (i. e. Christian Democracy parties). In 1954, out of political rather than ideological reasons, the government suppressed religious education in schools and attempted to legalize prostitution, to pass a divorce law and to promote a constitutional amendment to separate State and Church. Perón publicly accused bishops and priests of sabotaging his government.

On 1955-06-14, during the Corpus Christi procession, the bishops Manuel Tato and Ramón Novoa spoke against Perón, turning the celebration into an anti-government demonstration. Perón demanded the removal of the bishops to the Vatican. During the night, violent Peronist groups attacked and burned churches in Buenos Aires.

Anti-Peronists in the military, who were mostly Catholic, and factions of the Church, had been long encouraged by this building tension. On 16 June, two days after Corpus Christi, airplanes of the Navy fleet, with the motto Cristo vence ("Christ wins") painted on them, bombed Plaza de Mayo, killing hundreds of civilians, in the first move towards the coup d'état which would ultimately depose Perón, the Revolución Libertadora.

== Concordat ==
On 16 October 1966, the Argentine Chancellor Nicanor Costa Méndez signed an agreement with the Vatican, represented by the Nuncio Humberto Mozzoni. By this Concordat, which replaced the old Patronage system, the Argentine Church would have the right to create or modify dioceses in the national territory, to directly appoint archbishops and bishops, and to keep correspondence freely with the bishops, the clergy and the Argentine Catholics in general. The Concordat was ratified in the Holy See on 28 January 1967.

== 1976–1983 ==
See Dirty War#Participation of Catholic Church members

In 1976, a human rights lawyer accused Cardinal Jorge Bergoglio (the later Pope Francis) of conspiring with the junta to kidnap two Jesuit priests. Despite no hard evidence linking him to the crime, Cardinal Bergoglio, who headed the Society of Jesus in Argentina, had conflicts with priests advocating violence against the new military dictatorship. As head of the Jesuits, he secretly worked to save over 1000 dissidents from persecution by the military Junta, earning reconciliation with critics like the Mothers of the Plaza De Mayo.

During the dictatorship, chaplain Christian von Wernich was convicted of complicity in 7 homicides, 42 kidnappings, and 32 instances of torture. Some Catholic priests supported the Montoneros, with figures like Father Alberto Carbone preaching Marxism. Juan Ignacio Isla Casares, a Catholic youth leader, orchestrated the ambush and killing of five policemen with Montoneros' help near San Isidro Cathedral in 1975.

== Since the return of democracy (1983) ==
President Raúl Alfonsín (1983–1989) had a rough relationship with the Catholic Church. Before 1987, the Civil Code recognized de facto separation of husband and wife, but did not allow remarriage. A law of divorce was approved by the Chamber of Deputies in 1986. The Catholic Church pressured the Senate to stop it, threatening to deny the sacraments to those who would vote for it. The Senate finally passed the law on 3 June 1987. During this year the relationship with the Church was also damaged by the call to a new Pedagogical Congress that led the Church to fear a cut on the state subsidies to private schools, and by legislation reforms that equalled legitimate and "natural" (illegitimate) children, which the Church considered to affect the concept of a Christian family.

President Carlos Menem (1989–1999) was linked to conservative Vatican organizations (such as the Opus Dei) and was a staunch supporter of the Church's position on abortion, for which he was awarded a special decoration by Pope John Paul II, even while he was heavily criticized by prominent bishops because of the poverty and unemployment caused by his economic measures.

President Fernando de la Rúa (1999–2001) was also a devout Catholic, and did not have major problems dealing with the Church.

== Kirchner administration: 2003–2015 ==
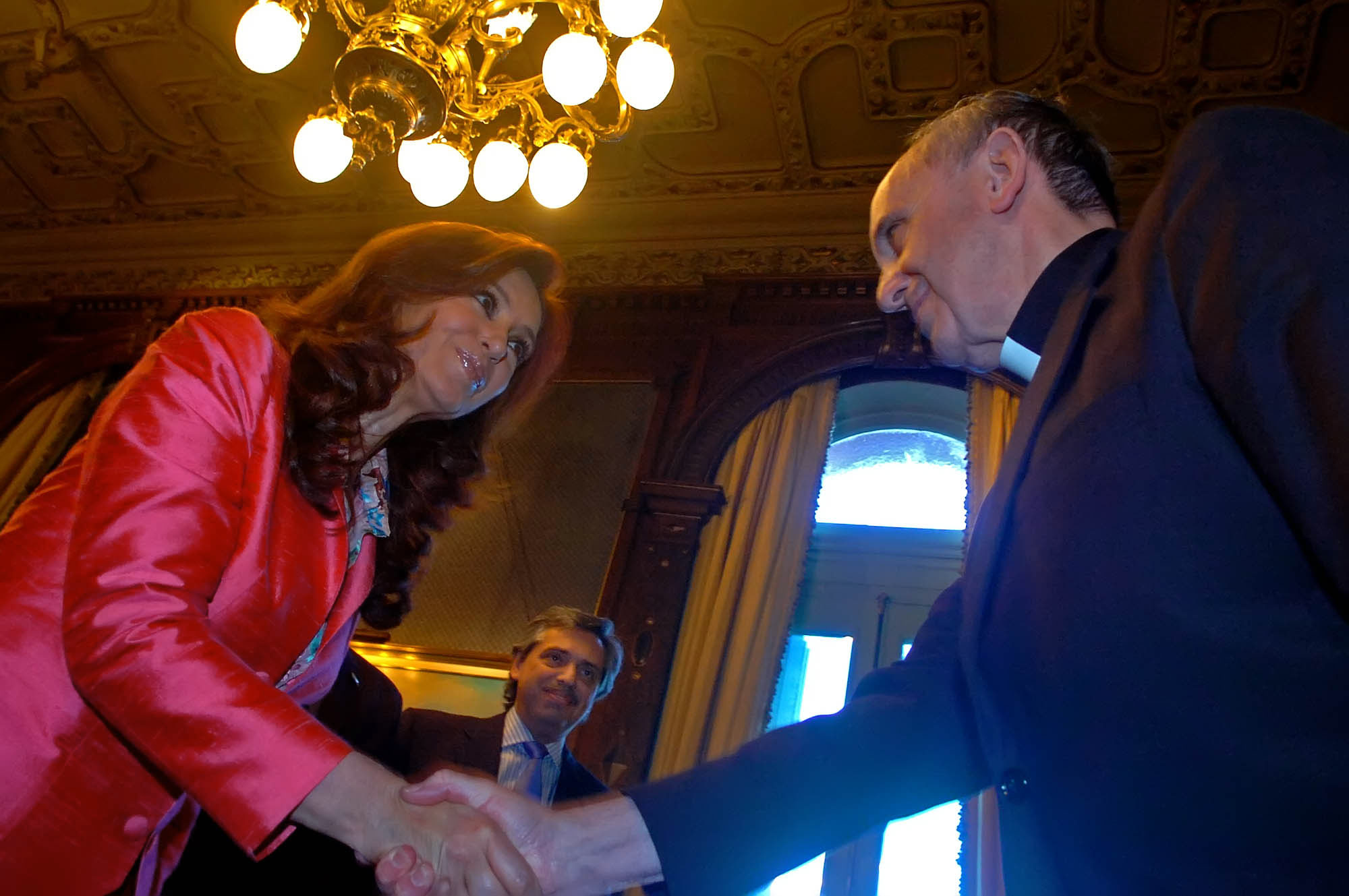
President Cristina Kirchner receives Cardinal Jorge Bergoglio, now Pope Francis, at the Casa Rosada.

President Néstor Kirchner (elected in 2003), while professing belief in the Catholic faith, often had a troubled relationship with the hierarchy of the Church. Kirchner belonged to the center-left wing of Peronism and placed emphasis on certain progressive views that conflicted with those of the Catholic Church.

=== Conflicts on sexual and reproductive rights ===
The Argentine national government passed laws and began a program to the effect of providing assistance on sex education to all citizens, including the provision of free combined oral contraceptive pills and condoms. The Church opposes artificial contraception and has placed conditions on its acceptance of sex education in schools.

At the beginning of 2005, the minister of Health, Ginés González García, made public his support for the legalization of abortion, and Kirchner's silence on the matter angered the Church. The military vicar Antonio Baseotto expressed his disgust by paraphrasing Mark 9:42 ("And whosoever shall cause one of these little ones that believe on me to stumble, it were better for him if a great millstone were hanged about his neck, and he were cast into the sea") and suggesting that González García should be given that treatment. Baseotto was heavily criticized because this "punishment" echoes the infamous vuelos de la muerte ("flights of death") whereby prisoners of the last military regime were thrown into the Atlantic from planes. The conflict escalated and caused the Argentine government to relieve Baseotto from his job as the head of the military chaplains. This prompted accusations on the part of Catholic observers (also fueled by right-wing opposition leaders and media) that such actions threatened religious freedom. The government pointed out that Baseotto is still a bishop and may celebrate Mass and perform pastoral duties wherever he chooses – he will simply not be on the payroll of the state.

President Kirchner was also criticized for not attending the funeral of Pope John Paul II (he did attend the inauguration of Pope Benedict XVI), which took place when the above conflict was still in the spotlight of the media. On the celebration of the May Revolution on 2005-05-25, Kirchner chose not to attend the Buenos Aires Te Deum but the one celebrated in the Cathedral of Santiago del Estero, where other public celebrations of the day were also moved. This absence of the President did not go unnoticed (it was the first such occasion in 175 years), but the government denied a political intention behind it, except the need to "federalize" the celebration.

In October 2005 conflict erupted again as the Argentine Chamber of Deputies took steps to pass a Sex Education Law that would encompass the whole school system (public and private, including confessional schools), forcing educational establishments to teach students about gender roles and contraception, among other topics. The Archbishop of La Plata, Héctor Aguer, accused the state of "promoting sexual corruption" and "inciting fornication, lust and promiscuity", denouncing that 11- and 12-year-old students in a school already implementing a sex education curriculum had received condoms and contraceptive pills. Upon being termed a "fanatic" by the former Minister González García, Aguer replied that the Minister was "intolerant and a fundamentalist" with regards to his views. The Permanent Secretariat for the Family, an organ of the Argentine Episcopal Conference, passed a declaration asking the representatives of the people not to approve sex education law projects "already rejected by the Argentinians". Soon afterwards, on 6 November, the Archbishop of Resistencia, Carmelo Giaquinta, entered the conflict by warning that the state would "lose its reason for existence" if it promoted such laws in the fields of health and education, and announced that he would "encourage Christians to civil disobedience" in that case.

In 2010 Argentina became the third Catholic country to legalize same-sex marriage despite heavy criticism and protests that turned violent between supporters of the traditional Church and advocates of homosexual rights.

=== 2005 Episcopal Conference document ===
On 12 November 2005 the Argentine bishops presided by Jorge Bergoglio, gathered in the 90th Assembly of the Argentine Episcopal Conference, held in Pilar, Buenos Aires, closed the meetings with an official document about pastoral matters that includes, as usual, a critical appraisal of socio-political issues. The document claimed that Argentina suffers "a worrying form of in-solidarity, [which is] the scandalous growth of the inequality of income distribution". On the following day, the Argentine Head of Cabinet, Alberto Fernández, replied that this "does not correspond with reality" and that the Church had "ignored much data provided by current statistics" which showed a decrease in poverty since the beginning of the Kirchner administration in 2003 (see Economy of Argentina). The bishops' document also included a controversial admonition:

Twenty-two years after the restoration of democracy, it is convenient for us elders to ask ourselves whether we are conveying the young the whole truth about what happened in the 1970s, or if we are offering them a biased portrayal of the facts, which could raise new feuds among Argentinians ... [Thus it would be] if we set aside the seriousness of State terror, the means employed and the ensuing crimes against humanity ... but the opposite could also happen, that the crimes of the guerilla were silenced or that they may not be duly abhorred.

Fernández called this "an unfortunate revisiting of the doctrine of the two demons" (purportedly claiming an equal moral ground for guerilla and State terrorism), since "there is nobody in Argentina who exalts the guerilla as the document says". Senator Miguel Ángel Pichetto (PJ) seconded the statement by Fernández, calling the above "a coup-calling (golpista) document that seems to have been written in the 1970s, at the time when some factions [of society] went knocking on [the doors of] military quarters".

President Kirchner himself replied on 16 November, commenting that the statements of the Church "look more like those of a political party, more like earthly affairs, than like the task they should be performing", and that the bishops were "absolutely wrong in their diagnosis of the situation of the country". On the issue of the 1970s, Kirchner criticized bishops "who weren't there while children were disappearing" and who "gave [the sacrament of] confession to torturers" of the Dirty War. Members of the opposition called Kirchner's comments "over-generalizing", "unjust" and "intolerant".

=== 2008 Salta Law on education ===
In December 2008 the legislature of Salta Province passed a controversial law making the teaching of religion compulsory in both state and private schools. The move sparked outrage among religious minorities and human rights organizations, which called for a secular educational system.

Governor Juan Manuel Urtubey, the proponent of the law, quickly pointed out that religious lessons would be oriented to all creeds, and that all students would take part, "regardless of their beliefs".

However, doubts remain about the legality of the measure, since it conflicts with the Provincial Constitution itself, which Urtubey helped write, when he was elected conventional constituent in 1998. Article 11º enshrines the secrecy of the citizen's faith, since it clearly states that No one must be asked what their religious beliefs are. Article 28º Section ñ also makes a statement, when it describes the objectives of the law:

to provide religious instruction, which is part of the curriculum, and is to be taught during school time, taking into account parents' and/or tutors' beliefs, who will decide whether their children will attend such classes. Contents (to be taught) and teachers' qualifications will require approval by church authorities.
