= Argentine Law 1420 =

1884 education act in Argentina

The Law 1420 of General Common Education of Argentina was a landmark national law that dictated public, compulsory, free, and secular education. It was passed in 1884 during the administration of President Julio Argentino Roca, after a number of similar laws of provincial scope and the conclusions of the Pedagogical Congress of 1882. This law established the mandatory primary education for all children from 6 to 14 years old. It ensured that all children would have access to a nearby school and that they would acquire important knowledge for their formation. It also established its gratuity and secularism.

The nonreligious education mandated by the law was controversial and caused a conflict between the Argentine government and the Catholic Church.

The law was created in a time of consolidation of the Argentine State after years of civil wars and division. It made Argentina especially advanced compared to other Latin American countries (analogous laws were created in Chile and Bolivia in 1920, Brazil in 1934 and in Peru in 1941). The Law 1.420 had an important effect in the reduction of illiteracy in the country. The statistics showed that before the law, over half of the population did not know how to read and write. The law also caused a great increase in school attendance.

== Historical and political context ==
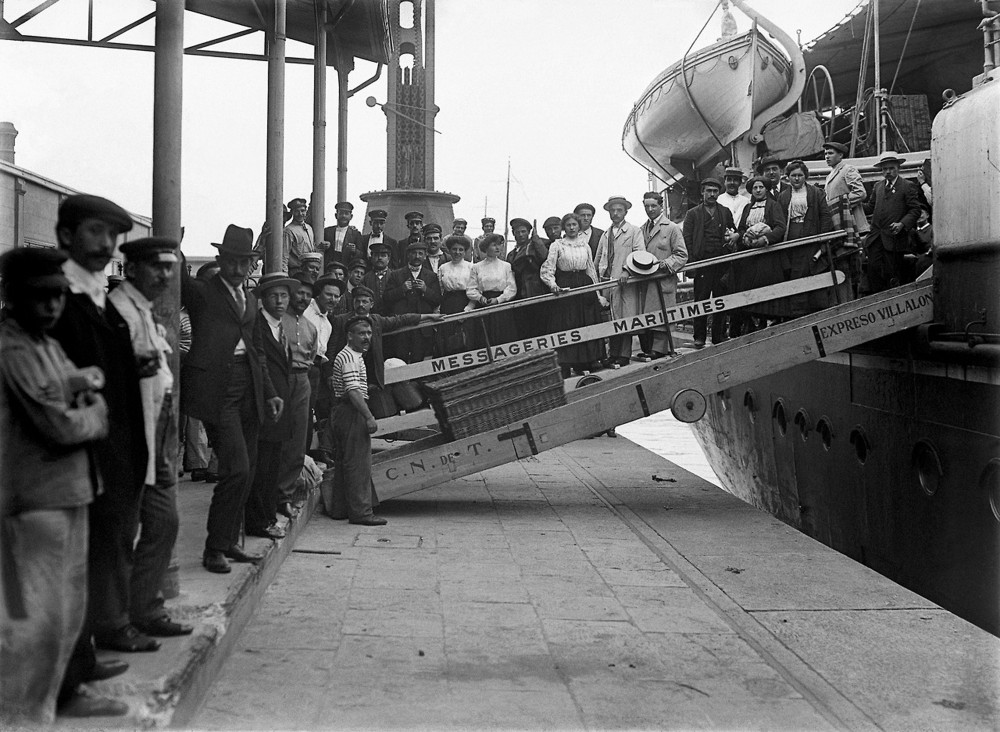
European immigrants arriving in Buenos Aires, Argentina during the Great European immigration wave to Argentina

Although the Law 1.420 was a project created by Domingo Faustino Sarmiento, the law was issued during the government of Julio Argentino Roca, a firm defender of the separation of the Church and the State. There was great turmoil among the most traditionalist and conservative sectors of Argentine society due to the replacement of the Catholic Church, which used to provide services such as education.

During the late 19th century, a massive wave of European immigrants arrived to Argentina. They had diverse origins, religions and languages, the public education system of Argentina is considered to have been essential to diminish the conflicts between the many ethnic groups that made up the country. The public schools taught the immigrants' children common values, history and new identity, and formed the incipient country's culture.

== Conflict with the Catholic Church ==
The Papal Nuncio, Luis Mattera, spoke against the law. The government replied that Mattera was free to expose his ideas privately but not to interfere in government matters. Mattera tried to stop the arrival of school teachers hired by the Argentine authorities in the United States for the direction of public secular establishments. Opposition to the law came also from priests' sermons, Church newspapers, documents by bishops, and demonstrations supported by the clergy.

When the first Normal School was established in Córdoba, the Capitular Vicar, Gerónimo Clara, and priests denounced it from the pulpits as anathema. Clara was arrested and charged by the national authorities.

Mattera spoke to the head of the school and asked for a number of conditions to be met, including the teaching of the Catholic religion in the establishment. Those requirements were conveyed to the provincial government and, in turn, to the national authorities, which rejected them as interference by a foreign agent. Mattera ended up apologizing through a particular missive to Roca.

== See also ==
- Church–state relations in Argentina
- Education in Argentina
