= Alberto Carlos Taquini =

Argentine cardiologist (1905–1998)

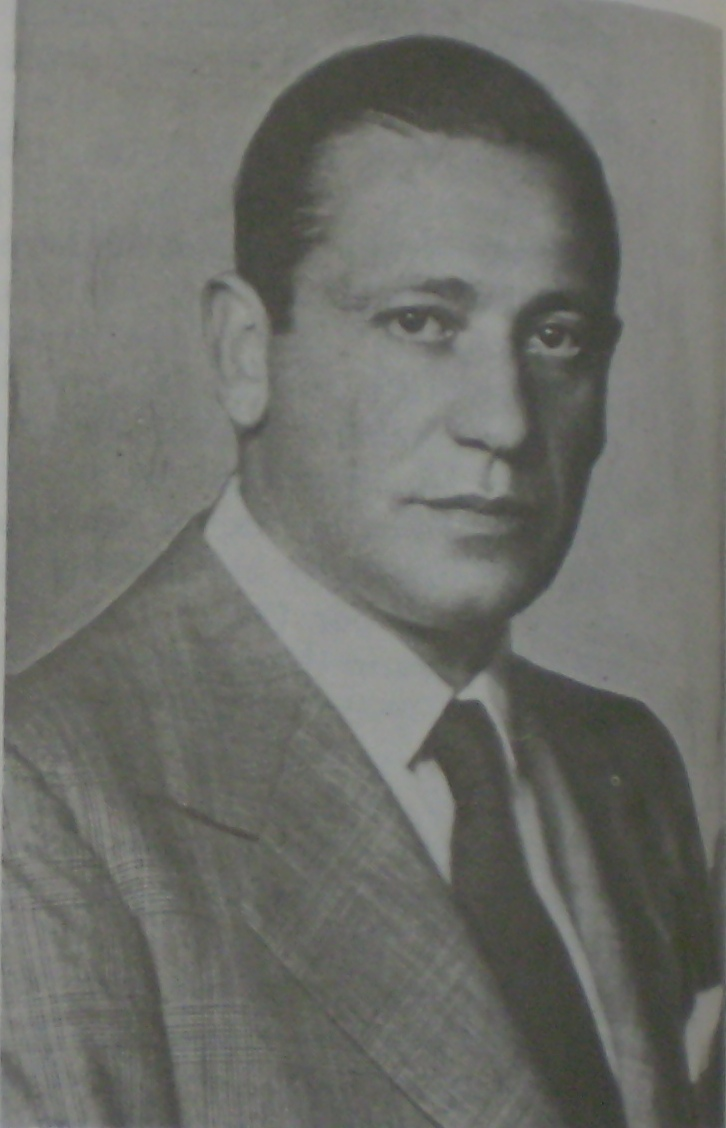
- Taquini, photo published 1971
- Born: December 6, 1905; Buenos Aires
- Died: March 4, 1998 (aged 92); Buenos Aires

Alberto Carlos Taquini (December 6, 1905 – March 4, 1998) was an Argentine cardiologist, clinical researcher and academic.

== Early life and education ==
Taquini was born in Buenos Aires to Carlota Castiglioni and Alberto Taquini. He enrolled at the University of Buenos Aires, and graduated with a Medical Degree in 1929. His work on the University of Buenos Aires School of Medicine research team earned Taquini a 1939 scholarship from the Argentine Society for the Advancement of Science, with which he completed further studies at the Harvard School of Medicine.

== Career ==
=== University of Buenos Aires ===
==== School of Medicine research team ====
He joined the research team led by Dr. Bernardo Houssay (who would earn the Nobel Prize in Physiology or Medicine in 1946), at the Department of Physiology of the University of Buenos Aires School of Medicine. Taquini worked with Luis Leloir (Nobel Prize in Chemistry, 1970), and in 1937, was named head of the research team. The team, which included Eduardo Braun-Menéndez and Juan Carlos Fasciolo, discovered angiotensin in 1939, and was the first to describe the enzymatic nature of the renin–angiotensin system and its role in hypertension. The renin–angiotensin system has since been demonstrated to be related to numerous physiological regulatory processes, both in normal and pathophysiological conditions, and to play critical roles in the circulatory system.

==== Cardiology Research director ====
He was appointed director of the new Institute of Cardiology Research at the University of Buenos Aires School of Medicine in 1944. The institute was created by Taquini's initiative and funding from local businessman Virginio Grego.

==== Educator and lecturer ====
Taquini continued to teach as Professor Emeritus at the University of Buenos Aires throughout his career. He also served as Visiting Professor in prestigious institutions around the world, including: the University of California, Stanford, Columbia, the University of Michigan, and Cornell, the University of Toronto, the University of Oxford, the University of Milan, the University of San Marcos in Peru, and the University of Chile.

=== Argentine National Research Council ===
He was appointed Director of the Argentine National Research Council (CONICET) in 1969, and served as the first Secretary of State for Science and Technology of Argentina (1968—1971). (Note: His son, Alberto Taquini, served a Chief of Staff during his father's tenure, and drafted the 1970 "Plan Taquini," which by way of decentralizing the strained system, resulted in the increase in the number of public universities in the country from 10 to 23 by 1973 (and to 40 by 2010).)

=== Professional organizations ===
Taquini continued to direct the institute, while serving as chair of Internal Medicine (1952—1956) and of Physiology (1961—1970), earning national and international renown in the field of cardiology and hypertension. Dr. Taquini was elected President of the World Heart Federation (1954—1962), the International Council on Hypertension (1954—1968), the Argentine Society of Clinical Investigation, the Argentine Society of Cardiology, and the Argentine Association for the Advancement of Science (1967—1987). A member of the Buenos Aires National Academy of Medicine, he received around 100 national and international awards and was named an Honorary Member of the American College of Physicians, the American Physiological Society, the American Heart Association, and the European Society of Cardiology.

=== Author ===
Taquini authored four books and collaborated in several others, as well as publishing over 350 scientific papers. He was a member of the editorial committees of many journals: Medicina, Revista de la Sociedad Argentina de Cardiología, Acta Physiologica et Pharmacologica Latino-Americana, the American Heart Association Journal, and Archives Internationales de Pharmacodynamie et Thérapie, among others.

== Personal life ==
Taquini married Haydée Azumendi, and they had three children.

He remained active in both academia and on the golf course in later years, and was head of the Institute of Cardiology Research when he died at the age of 92 in Buenos Aires in 1998.
