= Alberto Taquini =

Argentine biochemist

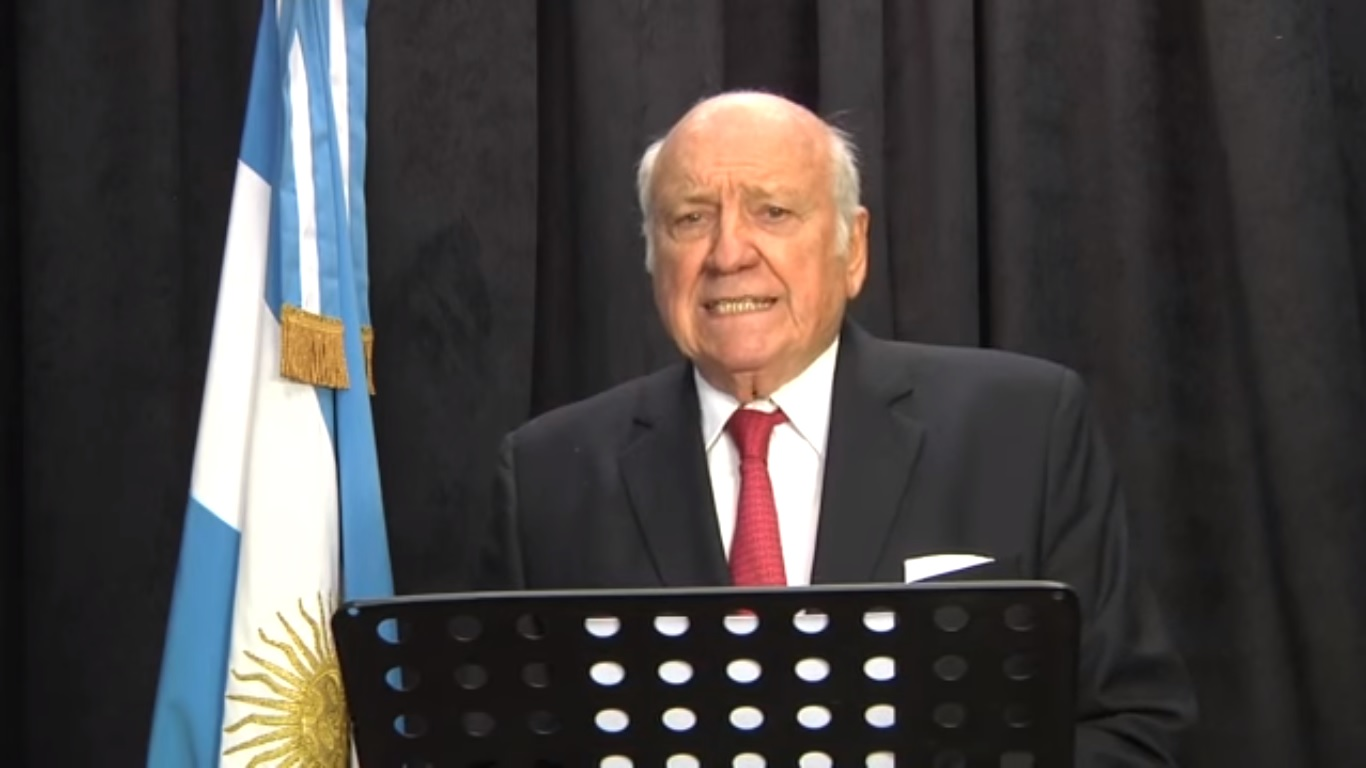
- Born: January 21, 1935 (age 91); Buenos Aires

Alberto Carlos Taquini (born January 21, 1935) is an Argentine biochemist and academic whose "Taquini Plan" resulted in the decentralization of Argentina's public university system.

== Life and work ==
Taquini was born in Buenos Aires to Haydée Azumendi and Alberto Carlos Taquini, a renowned cardiologist. He married María Martha Bosch, and the couple had one daughter.

He enrolled at the University of Buenos Aires and earned an MD, and began his career as a teaching assistant for Dr. Bernardo Houssay, winner of the Nobel Prize in Physiology or Medicine in 1946. He taught at his alma mater as a full-time professor of Human Physiology, and worked alongside his father at the latter's Institute of Cardiology Research from 1954 to 1966. He was a research fellow at the University of Michigan in 1959, at the University of Ghent in 1960, and at the Argentine National Research Council (CONICET) from 1961, and was named Dean of the School of Pharmacy and Biochemistry. The elder Taquini served as Director of CONICET and as the first Secretary of State for Science and Technology of Argentina from 1968 to 1971. Taquini was appointed Chief of Staff during his father's tenure, and drafted a project to modernize and decentralize the nation's national university system, as well as to make new universities smaller and their curricula more appropriate to each province's economic needs.

Proposed at the Samay Huasi mountain retreat during a November 1968 academic colloquium, the plan was drafted by Taquini, Dr. Sadi Rife, Dr. Enrique Urgoiti, and Marcelo Zapiola, and formally presented in May 1970. The proposed reforms were supported not only by those in academia, but also by the Argentine military and State Intelligence, who felt that the 10 existing national universities (who among them taught 85% of the nation's 238,000 university students) had become too concentrated and were thus becoming conducive to student upheaval, including riots. The "Plan for the Creation of New Universities" was thus signed into law by President Roberto Levingston (a former Intelligence Director) on November 9, 1970. The number of national universities expanded from 10 to 23 by 1973 (and to 47 by 2010), and though enrollment became less concentrated, the combined total at the universities of Buenos Aires, Córdoba, La Plata, or Rosario (traditionally the largest) rose from 150,000 in 1968 to 620,000 in 2006.

Taquini recounted the experience in Nuevas universidades para un nuevo país (New Universitied for a New Nation), published in 1972, and edited Ciencia e Investigación. He continued to teach at his alma mater as Dean of the School of Pharmacy and Physiology, and contributed an over 60 articles on hypertension research in peer-reviewed journals. He served in the UNESCO Commission of Experts on Science and Technology in 1981, and was later appointed President of the Province of Buenos Aires Scientific Research Commission. A complementary proposal to his 1970 reforms was proposed by Taquini in 1989. Calling for the creation of a system of national community colleges associated with each one's nearest national university, this new plan was included as Article 22 of the Higher Education Law signed by President Carlos Menem in 1994.

Taquini received an honorary doctorate at the University of Córdoba in 2005. Remaining active in educational policy debates, he proposed implementing a form of the Bologna process in the Argentine university system to standardize parameters for students, as well as to make their transfer from one school to the next less difficult. He also welcomed the prospect of the wider use of the iPad in the classroom.
