= Universidad Nacional del Sur =

National university in southern Argentina

Coordinates: 38°42′05″S 62°16′10″W

National University of the South
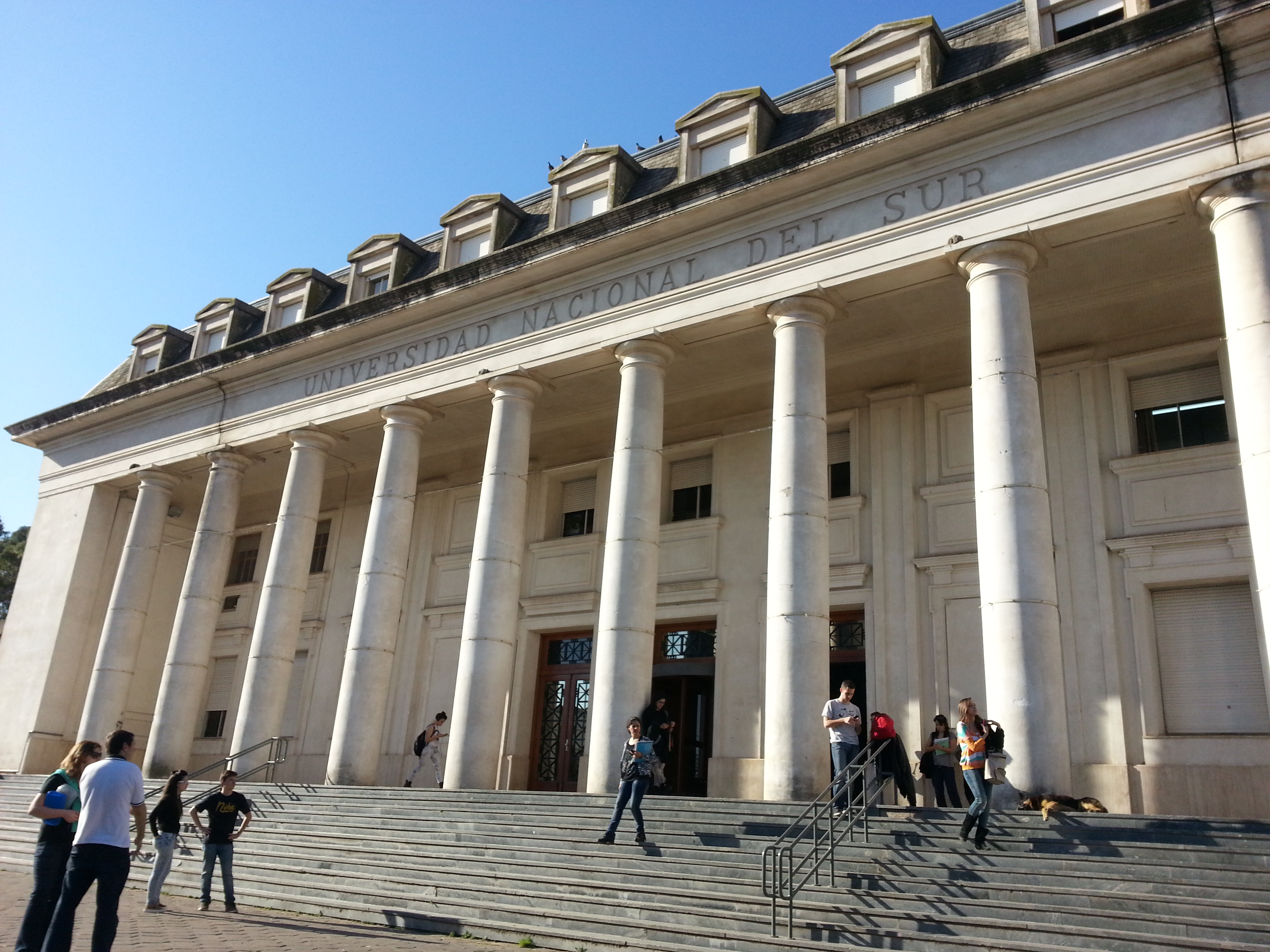
- Motto: Ardua Veritatem
- Type: Public
- Established: 1956
- Administrative staff: 3,703
- Students: 20,016
- Location: Bahía Blanca, Buenos Aires, Argentina
- Campus: urban
- Website: http://www.uns.edu.ar/

The National University of the South (in Spanish: Universidad Nacional del Sur, UNS) is the largest national university in southern Argentina.

The university was founded on January 5, 1956, and absorbed what had been the Technological Institute of South (Instituto Tecnológico del Sur, ITS), a former National University of La Plata affiliate established in 1946. Located in the city of Bahía Blanca, the school became the sixteenth in Argentina's national university system.

== History ==
The Instituto Tecnológico del Sur was created on October 9, 1946, by Provincial Act No. 5051, and it began its activities under the academic dependence on the National University of La Plata. In 1947, the Nation and the province Buenos Aires signed an agreement that stated that both of them would supply the funds for the operation and maintenance of the institute. On February 12, 1948, the incumbent president, Juan Domingo Perón, appointed Dr. Miguel López Francés as President of the university, who was in charge of adopting the necessary measures for the organization thereof. The official inauguration ceremony of the ITS was held on February 20, 1948. The category of university was granted in 1950, however, it was cancelled in 1952, and it depended again on the Ministry of Economy of the Nation. The first graduate of the institute was Engineer Nereo Roberto Parro, in 1953, who was a natural of the town of Tornquist. In 1955, after the fall of Perón's government, Professor Pedro González Prieto was appointed auditor of the institute, and proceedings before the national government began for the institute to become a national university. After the studies carried out by an advisor committee appointed by the Executive Power, the creation of the Universidad Nacional del Sur was approved by decree law No. 154, dated January 5, 1956.

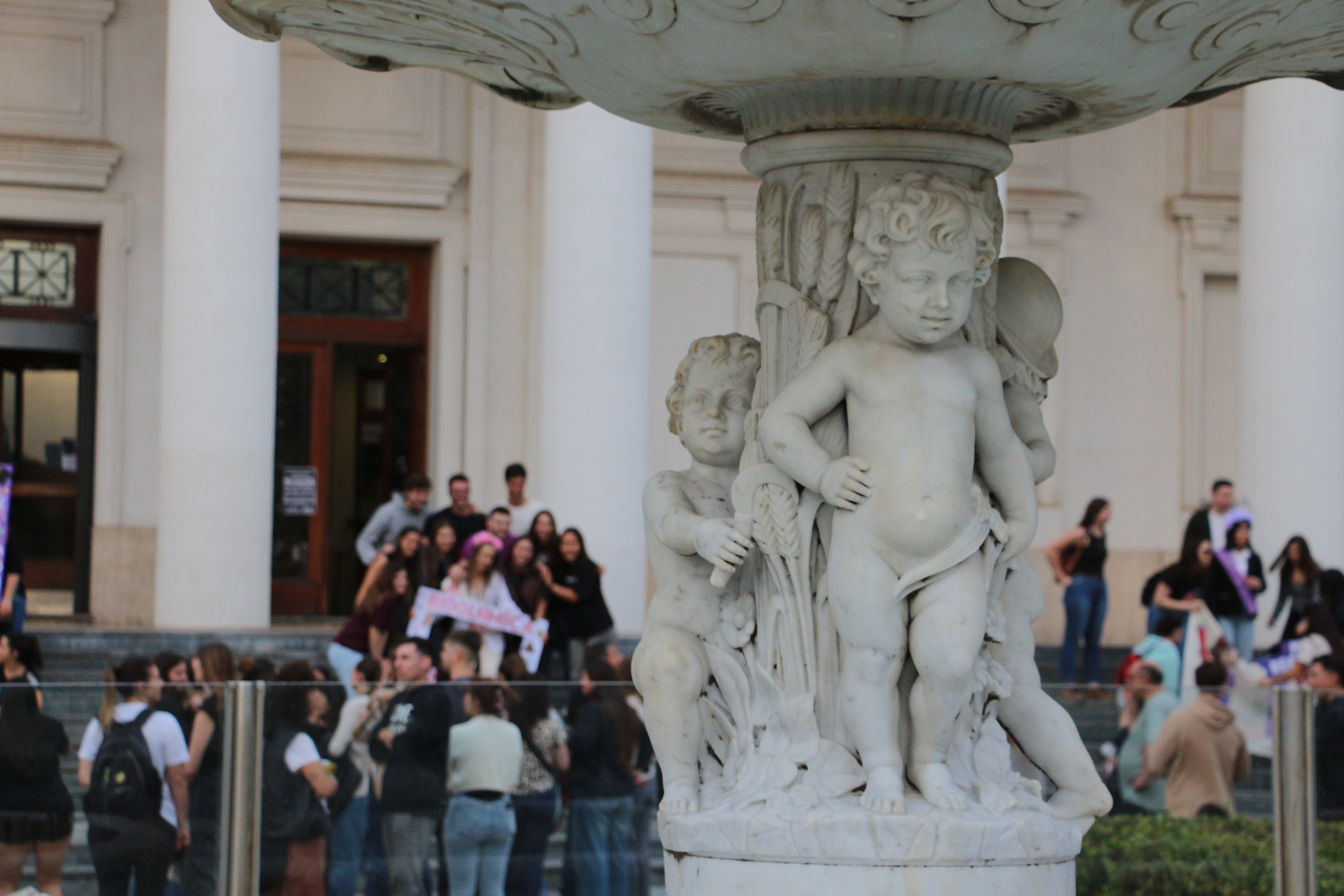
Lola Mora's fountain at the Universidad Nacional del Sur.

=== The Universidad Nacional del Sur ===
In 1956 Professor Vicente Fatone was appointed Auditor President. Classes at the brand new institution began on April 1 of that same year. The UNS was the seventh national university created in the country, after the universities of Córdoba (1613), La Plata (1890), Tucumán (1912), Litoral (1919), and Cuyo (1939).

The new institution organized its academic structure into Departments, instead of the traditional Schools. Departments have a smaller administrative structure and allow for knowledge flexibility and inter-disciplinarity. Thus, academic units do not have to create for their careers those courses given at other departments, so that students can take them at the corresponding departments. The first Departments were Accountancy, Economics, Physics, Geology and Geography, Mathematics, Engineering, Humanities, and Chemistry.

After just a month of its opening, two students who had begun their careers at the institute, Jorge Laurent and David Tomás Prieto, took the exams for the last courses, thus becoming the first graduates in the institution. The first woman to obtain her degree at the UNS was Betty Kerlleñevich, from Bahía Blanca, one of the founding students of the ITS, who also obtained a degree in engineering.

== Campus and facilities ==
The main university complex is located at Alem 1253, where most of the Departments and laboratories operate as well as the Central Library. It is a large building that takes up more than a block and at the front there is a fountain with a sculpture by the artist Lola Mora. There are other buildings at the same premises:

At the intersection of 12 de Octubre and San Juan streets, are the buildings for the Departments of Humanities, Economics, Geography and Tourism, and Administration Sciences.

In the area known as "Altos del Palihue" there is another complex where the Departments of Agronomy and Law are located. There, the university has several acres of land, in which the Escuela de Agricultura y Ganadería "Ing. Agr. Adolfo J. Zabala" is also located.

The building located at Colon 80 originally corresponded to the headquarters of the Universidad Nacional del Sur. At present, the activities of the President's Office and its Secretariats are focused here, together with other administrative offices.

At Alem 925 is the "Casa de la Cultura", a colonial mansion that was formerly the center of an important villa. In this building, the General Secretariat of Communication and Culture organizes artistic and cultural activities. The University Foundation (FUNS) and Publishing House (EdiUNS) are also located there. In the buildings located at 11 de Abril 445 are the Escuela Superior de Comercio, Escuela de EGB (Initial Level, Levels 1, 2, and 3) and Escuela Normal Superior.

== Departments ==
- Agronomy
- Biology, Biochemistry and Pharmacy
- Chemistry
- Chemical engineering
- Computer science
- Economics
- Electrical engineering
- Engineering
- Geography
- Geology
- Humanities
- Law
- Management
- Mathematics
- Health sciences
- Physics
