= National University of Río Cuarto =

- Universidad Nacional de Río Cuarto
- Coat of arms of the National University of Río Cuarto
- Motto: Creer... Crear... Crecer...
- Motto in English: To believe... to create... to grow...
- Type: National Public
- Established: May 1, 1971
- Rector: Marisa Rovera
- Vice-Rector: Nora Bianconi
- Academic staff: 560 + 1000 auxiliaries
- Students: 20,700
- Undergraduates: 20,000
- Postgraduates: 700
- Location: Río Cuarto, Córdoba, Argentina; 33.109499°S 64.300511°W
- Campus: City outskirts
- Website: http://www.unrc.edu.ar/

The National University of Río Cuarto (Spanish: Universidad Nacional de Río Cuarto) is an Argentine national university, situated in the city of Río Cuarto, Córdoba. It currently has over 20,000 regular students, 1,500 teaching staff, 5 faculties and 42 available degrees.

== History ==
On May 1, 1971, the National Executive Power promulgated Law 19.020 thus creating the National University of Río Cuarto within a program to adapt Argentine university education to the development needs proposed by the Taquini Plan and in response to a both local and regional social strength that achieved the greatest cultural conquest of the region with the eponymous headquarters in the Province of Córdoba.

That is how the building works of the University Campus began on the outskirts of the downtown area, on Route 36. Then a new stage began: dismantling, requesting the bank line, the altimetric survey of the land, perimeter fencing and getting to the field electricity, telephone and provide water. The construction of the entrance and a checkpoint for surveillance was carried out, the flagpole and the flag were inaugurated, both donated by the Rural Society of Río Cuarto and the flag of ceremonies by the CGT of Río Cuarto.

== The University Campus ==
It is located 6 km. from the center of the city of Río Cuarto, and has 165 hectares to which are added 1,445 hectares of experimentation fields and diverse cultural practices.

The campus grounds are located in a pleasant natural landscape characterized by terraces gently leaning on the north bank of the Fourth River, alternated with more than 50,000 square meters of modern buildings that house spacious classrooms, laboratories and experimental cabinets, functional administrative offices, residences students and teachers, sports facilities and meeting rooms and events.

== See also ==
- Argentine Universities
