= National University of San Luis =

- Universidad Nacional de San Luis
- Type: Public
- Established: 1973
- President: Dr. Félix Nieto Quintas
- Academic staff: 1,656
- Students: 12,399
- Location: San Luis, San Luis, Argentine
- Website: www.unsl.edu.ar

The National University of San Luis (in Spanish, Universidad Nacional de San Luis, UNSL) is a public university in Argentina, with its seat in the city of San Luis, capital of the province of the same name, in the Cuyo region. It was created in 1973, along with the National University of San Juan, split off the National University of Cuyo based in Mendoza.

== Facilities and other institutions ==
UNSL has eight faculties:

- Faculty of Physico-Mathematical and Natural Sciences
- Faculty of Human Sciences
- Faculty of Psychology
- Faculty of Health Sciences
- Faculty of Engineering and Agricultural Sciences
- Faculty of Economico legal and Social Sciences
- Faculty of Tourism and Urban planning
- Faculty of Chemistry, Biochemistry and Pharmacy

Other institutions depending on it are:

- Juan Pascual Pringles Normal School
- San Luis Applied Mathematics Institute (IMASL)
- Applied Physics Research Institute (INFAP)
- Chemical Technology Research Institute (INTEQUI)
- Open and Distance Education Department (DEDA)
- Technico-Instrumental Teaching Department (DETI)
- Educational Alternatives Laboratory
- Educational Informatics Center
- Interdisciplinary Service Center

== See also ==
- List of Argentine universities
