= Napaleofú =

- Town
- Napaleoufu's main square
- Interactive map of Napaleofú
- Coordinates: 37°37.464′S 58°44.832′W
- Country: Argentina
- Province: Buenos Aires
- Partidos: Barcarce and Lobería
- Established: December 1914
- Elevation: 159 m (522 ft)

Population
  - Total: 374 inhabitants
- Source: 2010 INDEC National Census.
- Time zone: UTC−3 (ART)
- Postal code: 7007
- Area code: 02266

Napaleofú is a small town in the southeast of the province of Buenos Aires, in Argentina. It is located 50 km from Tandil and 63 km from Balcarce and administratively depends on the Balcarce Partido, although part of its territory belongs to the Lobería Partido.

Napaleofú's economy is mainly based on agricultural and livestock production, quarrying and some industrial activities such as the production of bread, pasta, and pastries on a smaller scale. The fact that the territory belongs to two partidos (three in practice) brings with it some problems: for example, half of a school belongs to one partido and the other half to the other. The 2001 census gives a population of roughly three hundred inhabitants, although unofficial polls report more than a thousand. The town has a kindergarten, a primary school and a secondary school.

== Geography ==
Napaleofú is 50 km from Tandil, 62 km from Balcarce and 63 km from Lobería. Territorially, the town is located between two partidos: the urban area is under the jurisdiction of the Balcarce Partido, but most of the rural area is under the jurisdiction of the Lobería Partido. It could also be said that it is a tripartite district, since some of the adjoining fields are in the territory of the Tandil Partido.

=== Terrain ===
It is located in an agricultural plain area, close to the sea to the east and to the Tandilia System to the west. It is a gently sloping piedmont area formed by loessic sediments. The depth of these sediments tends to be low to medium, and sometimes there is the presence of tosca (calcic rocky horizon before reaching a depth of 1.5 m). Where this petrocalcic horizon is found, it limits agricultural use.

=== Climate ===
The climate of the area has the characteristic of being an oceanic climate with a sub-humid-humid water regime, with an average annual rainfall of 800 mm with maximums in January, February and March and minimums in June, July and August. The average annual temperature is 13.3º. October to early March is considered the frost-free period.

=== Vegetation ===
Little remains of the original vegetation of this region, due to intensive human use of the territory. Potential vegetation corresponds to grass steppes of less than one meter in height.

== Toponymy ==
The name is a derivation of the Mapuche words napa or napad, a corruption of chapa, meaning "mud", and leuvú, standing for "stream", in the sense of "muddy brook" a compound term with which, probably, the Serranos tribe referred to what is known today as Arroyo Chico in Spanish ("Little Brook").

== History ==
=== Native people ===
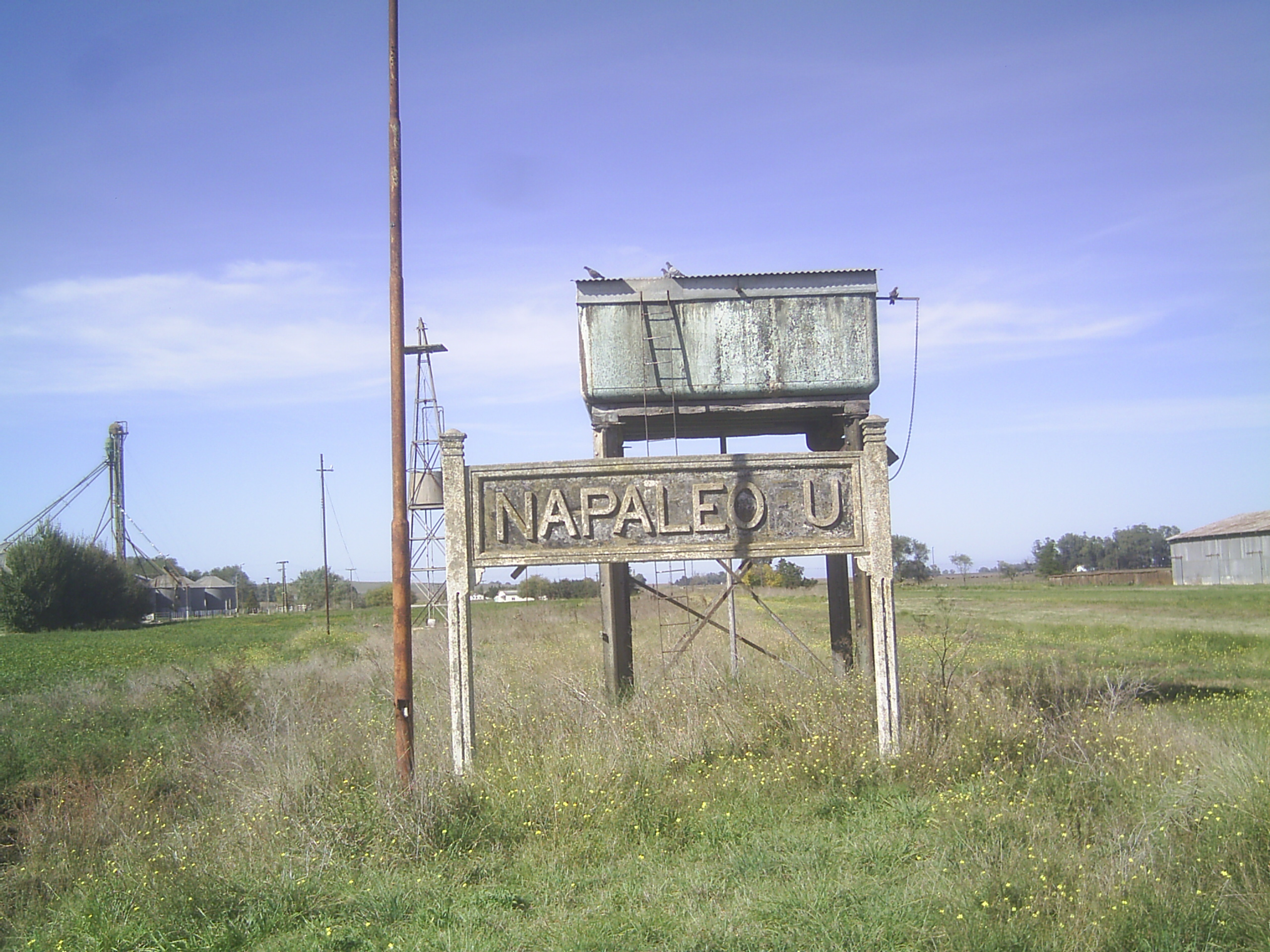
Napaleofú: entrance to the railroad station.

The original population of these lands was called serranos, a Puelche group belonging to the Tehuelche cultural complex which, from the middle of the 18th century, began to be affected by the expansion of the Mapuches or Araucanos. They hunted guanacos and used the stone from the mountain chains to make weapons and stone tools; there are archaeological remains of these workshops in several places in the mountain chain, such as in the so-called Cueva del Indio.

After the arrival of the Spanish conquistadors and the introduction of cattle in the Pampas region, these native groups reorganized their subsistence activities around the trade of the so-called cimarrón cattle, which multiplied freely thanks to the large extensions of natural pastures. The Indios Serranos (Spanish for "Highlands indigenous people") maintained commercial contacts with the "whites" established in the frontier zone and sometimes also attacked the estancias to steal the cattle.

As a result of the successive military expeditions carried out by the government of the Argentine Republic against the native peoples in the 19th century, known as the Desert Campaign, the native population began to disappear towards the middle of that century. Nevertheless, vestiges have remained in Napaleofú that bear witness to their presence in the region, such as the corrals built with superimposed stones that formed walls two meters high and one hundred meters long. These corrals were places of refuge and also for raising or maintaining livestock until they were sold.

=== Emphyteusis and First Settlers ===
Around 1825, after the military campaigns organized by General Martín Rodríguez while he was governor of the province of Buenos Aires, the lands obtained came under the jurisdiction of the government of that province, then part of the United Provinces of the Río de la Plata. But, soon after, they were ceded to the English company Baring Brothers Co. as a guarantee for a loan requested by the government. As these lands could not be sold, they were leased in large extensions and for periods of 20 or 30 years. The tenants of these lands were called emphyteuta.

In 1826, the governor of Buenos Aires Province granted Manuel Sánchez, as an emphyteusis, an extension of land of two leagues and three-quarters of an area adjacent to the Arroyo Napaleofú (at that time called "Arroyo Chico"), thus forming the "Estancia Napaleofú", the oldest property in the area.

Other enfiteutas in the Napaleofú area occupied land in the area of the Arroyo Chapaleofú and established estancias. Fuerte Independencia, in Tandil, assured them some protection against indigenous attacks. The first settlers arrived from the north of the Salado River and later on, Europeans. The colonizing expedition was organized by Governor Juan Manuel de Rosas in 1833 who used the indigenous attacks as a pretext. Once the indigenous population had been subdued, he divided the territories of Volcán, Tapalqué, Chapaleofú, Huesos, Quequén, Tandil and Napaleofú in emphyteusis. However, the raids continued for many years. Hermenegildo Italiano refers to the last one in the area in 1859, when "the indigenous population of Calfucurá and Mariano Rosas" carried out a raid on the city of Azul Partido with two thousand warriors. General Venancio Flores and Colonel Ignacio Rivas went out to beat them, so many of the attackers headed towards the Arroyo Chico, which runs through the Estancia San Juan. There they were beaten by the settlers.

There are numerous stories and legends about the existence of "vagos" and "malentretenidos", people who fled from their original towns where there were already justices of the peace, such as the Barrientos brothers, who hid in caves in the mountain chains near San Manuel, which today bear their names. In those times there were already "pulperías" that served as stores and refuge for travelers in case of a possible attack by the "malones".

=== Origins of the town ===
The first estancias with protective moats were joined by the estancias of Estancia Napaleofú, which gradually took shape with its corrals and the first trees. When Sánchez died in 1872, Estancia Napaleofú was inherited by his sister Benita, married to Santos Calvento. One of the daughters of the couple, Concepción, married Miguel Cuevas and after the death of her parents, she bought the corresponding parts of the estancia from her eight siblings, becoming the sole owner. The Cuevas family donated the land for the laying of the railroad where the station and the small town that bears the name of the estancia were constructed.

The settlement of Napaleofú was constituted as such from the estancias in the area. But the town itself originated with the arrival of the Southern Railroad, later called General Roca. After carrying out feasibility studies to set up the railway network, the company decided that the network should connect the most productive areas. Thus, in 1914, it reached Napaleofú, a place that was the railhead for 15 years and centralized the agricultural and commercial movement of a vast area.

In this plain environment, a railroad stop was set up every twenty kilometers. The Napaleofú Station facilities were erected where they are today, on land donated by the Cuevas family. The station was inaugurated on 16 December 1914, under the jurisdiction of the Balcarce Partido. It was intended to name the station Miguel Cuevas as a tribute to the head of the donor family, but the government official in charge of this procedure demanded a "bribe", to which Cuevas objected. Other sources maintain that this name was not possible because there was a railway stop in Mendoza called "De las Cuevas".

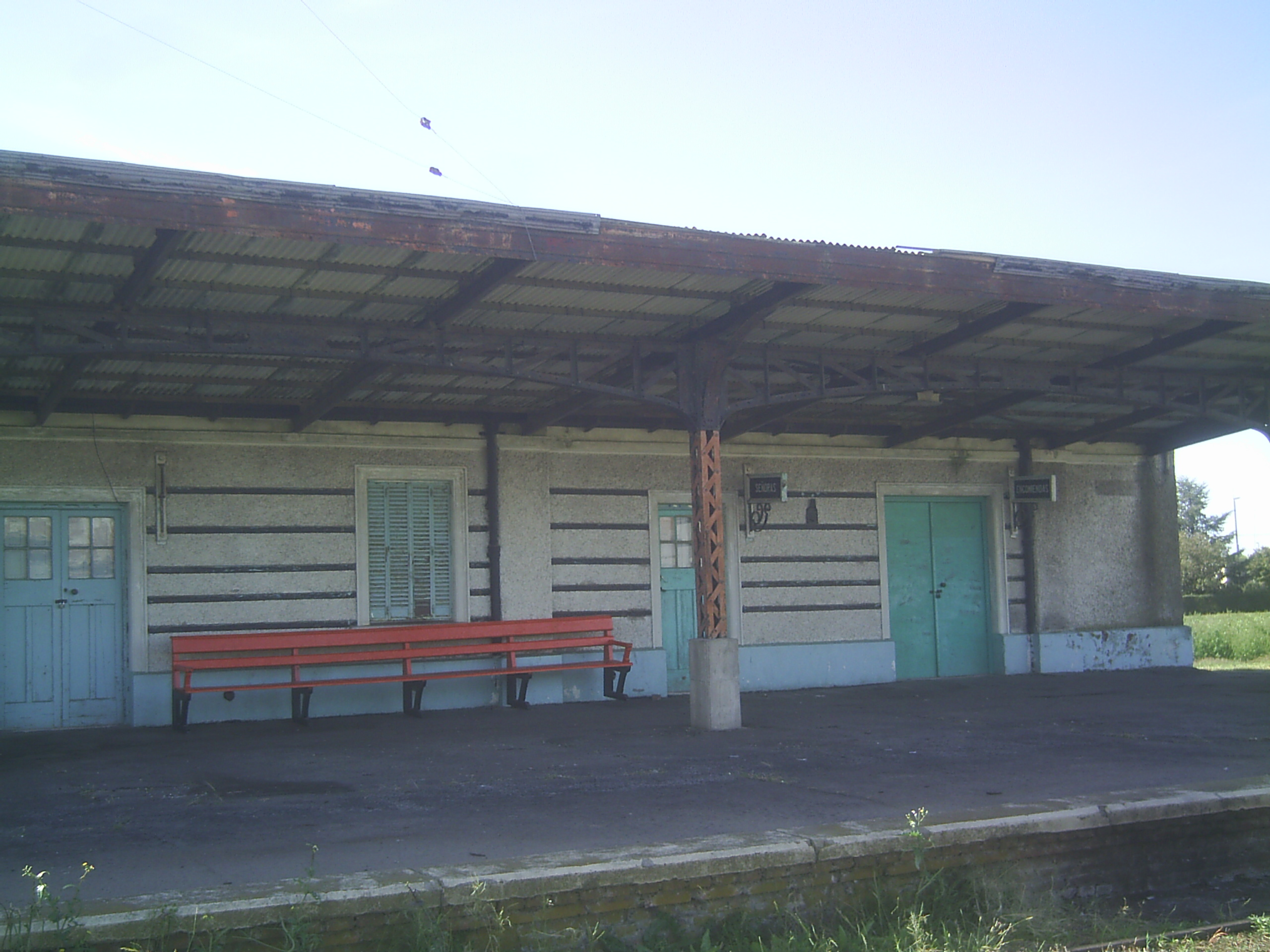
View of the railroad station.

Also in 1914 the store El Cantábrico opened its doors, the first store in town, with La Fundadora as its original name. Mr. Antonio Lagrutta was its first owner, later Mr. Fort and from 1939 the Balza brothers. In this store were concentrated services of warehouse, beverage dispatch and corralón of construction materials; it attended transactions and in the same building operated a small hotel or inn, a hairdresser's shop and later a social and sports club. A general store, a sawmill, an animal wharf and some houses were built around the station. In 1929, Napaleofú had a population of one hundred inhabitants dedicated to agricultural and livestock activities. Most of the current settlers are descendants of the immigrants who arrived in this rural area at the beginning of the 20th century. The new arrivals were mainly Spanish, Basque-French and Italian.

In addition, in the 1940s, groups of Argentine immigrants also settled in the area, predominantly from Santiago del Estero, who worked in the potato harvest.

In 1946, National Route 226 was inaugurated, which passed 5 km from the town and could be accessed by a road adjacent to the railroad. When National Route 227 was built, linking Route 226 with Quequén, the new town began to take shape. The Municipal Delegation, the church, the kindergarten and some businesses were built.

== Streets and their names ==
The streets of Napaleofú did not have names because everybody knew each other and knew where they lived, but it was inconvenient for the postal services to deliver the shipments; as an example we can mention the Telefónica company when it came to deliver the telephone bills. This company was the first to support a project of students from the Escuela de Educación Media Nº 1, approved in 1994 by the Balcarce Deliberating Council, which decided to recognize the roots of their town and pay homage to its first settlers by giving names derived from the Mapuche language to the streets.

Thus, the streets were given the following names: the street at the entrance to the town is called "Conque" (entrance in Mapuche language) and the one at the exit, "Tuun" (to leave); the one in the square, "Ranguiche" (in the middle of the crowd); the one of the bar, "Putupeyel" (drink); the street where the soccer field is located, "Palihue" (field); the one of the police station, "Lovhuen" (headquarters), the one of the store, "Huelucau" (commerce); the one of the middle school, "Quimelcan" (to instruct) and the one of the kindergarten, "Quiteu" (gardener). Others, such as "Cunapán" (to come here) or "Nguepal" (to pass through), do not designate a particular address or institution.

Some neighbors opposed this project because they wanted to maintain the tradition of not naming the streets. Even more than a decade after the new names were assigned, they still call the street "Conque" the street at the entrance, because it is difficult for them to pronounce the Mapuche names.

A neighbor said:

In Napaleofú there were no problems, because we all knew each other. The problem is outside, when it is time to do paperwork. For example, many people in the cities find it hard to understand that we live on a street without a number, because they have to fill in boxes with forms. And if they write down the name of the street, they write it in any way they can.

— Elsa Guillermo, a young woman from the town interviewed by La Nación newspaper

== Belonging to three partidos ==
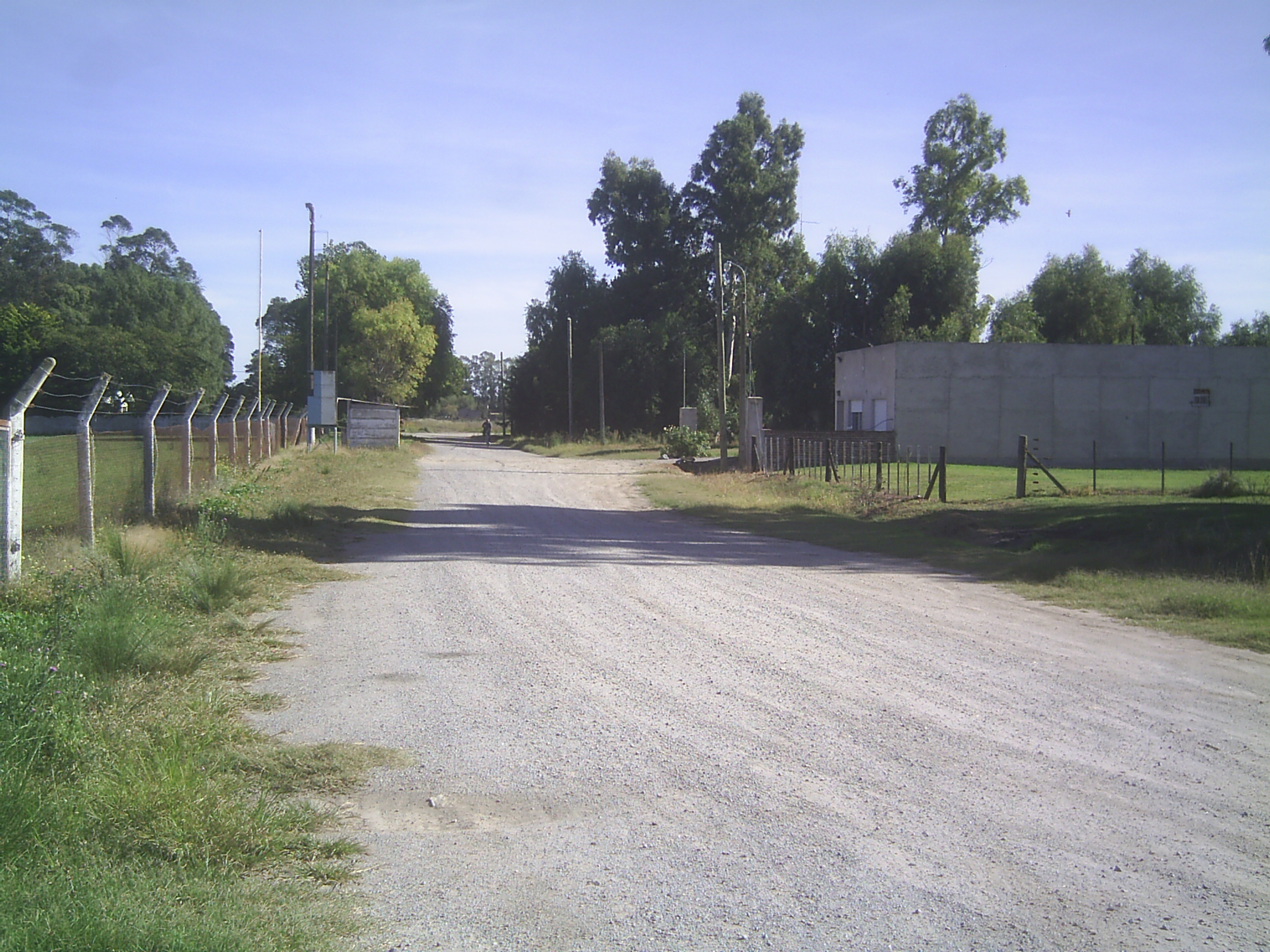
The street "Devupulen", limit between the partidos of Lobería and Balcarce.

When in 1914 the town was divided between Lobería and Balcarce, some problems arose. The former owners of vehicles had to pay two taxes: the one corresponding to the municipality of Lobería and the one of Balcarce to circulate in their streets. Some citizens put their legal domicile in Lobería to obtain their driving license faster than in Balcarce.

Another significant fact is that a large number of people are registered in Tandil, where they must go to vote, and students attending university courses at the National University of Central Buenos Aires.

Some of the consequences of belonging to different partidos are curious. The field of the club Defensores belongs to Lobería but the changing rooms are across the street "Devupulen" (which is the limit between the two partidos) and therefore belong to Balcarce. The same happens with School Nº26, some of its classrooms are in Balcarce and others in Lobería. The streets, on the other hand, must be repaired by an operator of the municipality to which it belongs.

== Population ==
Napaleofú has 374 inhabitants (INDEC, 2010), which represents a slight decrease of 0.8% compared to the 377 inhabitants (INDEC, 2001) of the previous census.

of demographic evolution vertical bar chart of Napaleofú between 1991 and 2010
Source: INDEC National Census.

Surveys conducted in 2008 indicated that there would be more than one thousand.

All the inhabitants regularly go to the club "Defensores" where most of the dances and parties are held and are followers of the peña El Fogón ("The Campfire").

The local people donated funds to paint the chapel, remodel the police station, purchase a patrol car and night vision goggles so that the police can fight rural crime.

A group of neighbors also plant soybeans on state-owned land belonging to the railroad to raise funds for local entities. The oilseed chosen offers the advantage of being cheaper and leaving more profit in the harvest. Wheat is very exposed to fires, sunflower is preyed upon by parrots, and the local people eat the corn if they plant corn. For these reasons these grains are not planted for the project. The railroad company allocated ten hectares for the group to farm. A local contractor planted and harvested the soybeans. The proceeds went to the club, schools, the retirement center and other establishments.

== Economy ==
Agricultural production is diversified, depending on the size of the land, soil characteristics and market fluctuations. Crop rotation is practiced: winter or spring wheat, oats for grazing, corn for grain or fodder, sunflower and potatoes. This area is outside the so-called "soybeanization" process (exclusive sowing of soybeans). There are silos in the area to store summer crop production as a reserve for the winter or to supplement livestock feed rations. This increases the average yield per hectare. Producers carry out chemical weed and pest control with ground or aerial equipment; they also use manure and fertilizers.

Regarding livestock activities, cows are raised for dairy farming or beef production. All of the production is sold in the Liniers Market or in cool stores. Sheep farming has decreased and is kept only for family consumption. Dairy farms vary in size, from the largest with modern technology to the smallest, which have strict quality control by Argentina's leading dairy companies.

There was an incipient mining activity. Stone began to be extracted to build breakwaters in Necochea and Quequén.

The production of manufactured goods of agricultural origin completes the picture of the town's economic activities. Bread, pasta and pastries, sausages, cheese and sweets are produced. There are also some workshops for artistic blacksmithing, ironwork and lathe work.

== Club Defensores de Napaleofú ==
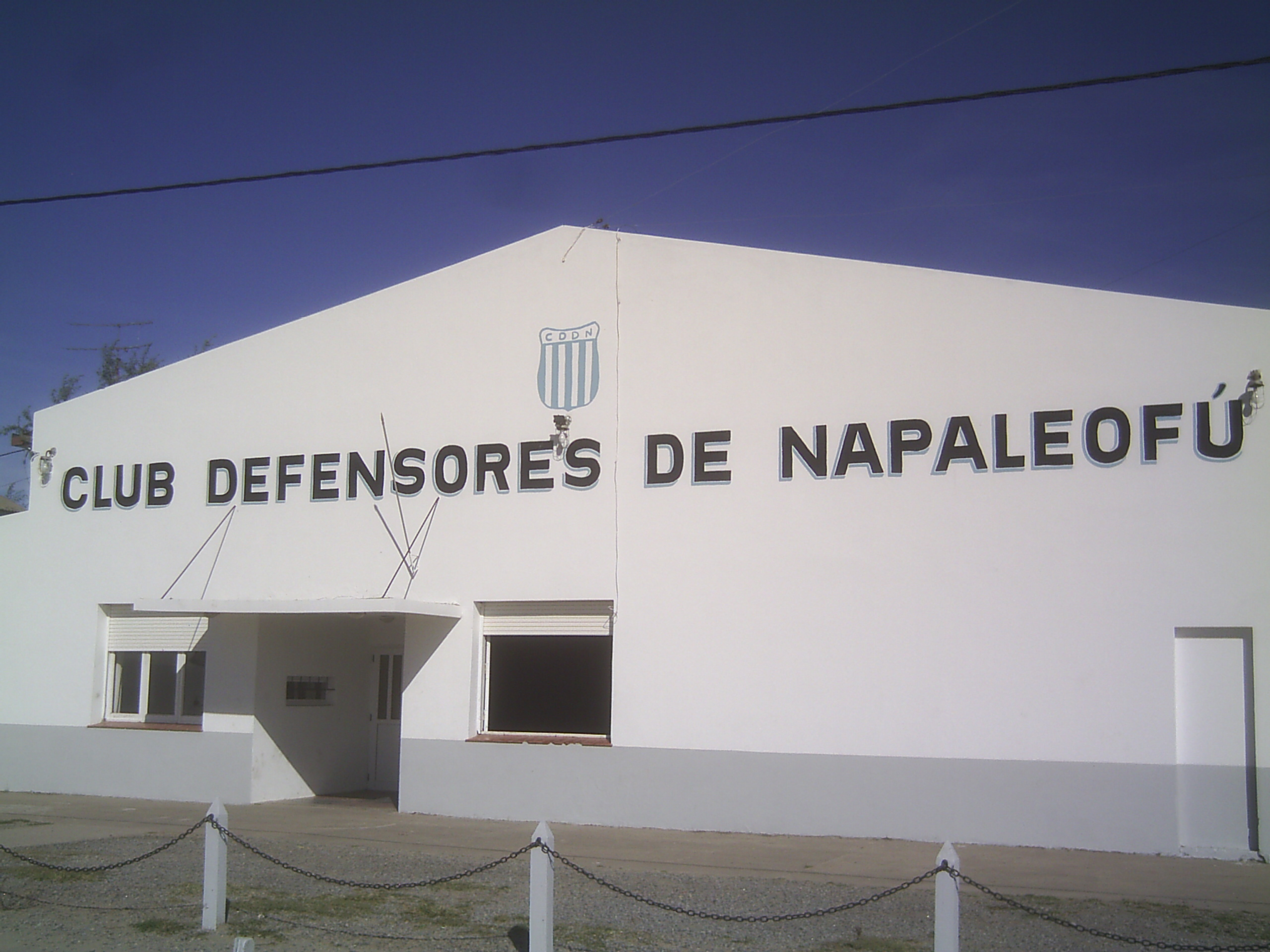
The Club Defensores of Napaleofú.

It began its activities in 1922 under the name of Club Defensores de Napaleofú. Between 1925 and 1927 it was closed. In 1930 it was reopened managed by a commission headed by Eduardo Varela who since 1928 was dedicated to the subject.

Currently the main sport is football, but it also develops social and cultural activities. These activities take place in the headquarters built in 1960, which replaced an old one built with sheet metal. In 1984 a place for board meetings or small social gatherings was added.

In soccer it is a member of the "Liga Agraria Amateur". In its beginnings and until 1969 it was a member of the "Liga Regional Agraria". Until 1979 it was a member of the "Liga Tandilense" of this sport, becoming champion in its first participation. During the year 1979 it was retired, re-entering in 1979 in the second division. In 1982 it retired and in 1992 it became affiliated to the Liga Amateur and formed a subcommittee in charge of the subject. The club's economy is based on the sale of raffles and donations and the percentage of ticket sales provided by the League.

== Bibliography ==
- Meineri, Ana María (1986). Congreso Nacional de Geografía. La importancia de los pequeños espacios (in Spanish). Sociedad Argentina de Estudios Geográficos GAEA.
- Saguier, Eduardo R. (2004). Genealogía de la tragedia argentina (1600–1900) (PDF) (in Spanish). Vol. III. UBA-CONICET.
