= San Manuel =

San Manuel may refer to the following:

== Places ==
Argentina

- San Manuel, Buenos Aires, a settlement in Lobería Partido

Honduras

- San Manuel, Cortés

Philippines

- San Manuel, Isabela
- San Manuel, Pangasinan
- San Manuel, Tarlac

United States

- San Manuel, Arizona

== People ==
- San Manuel Band of Mission Indians, a Serrano tribe in southern California
