= I Acevedo =

Argentine writer

- Born: 1983 (age 42–43); Napaleofú, Argentina
- Education: University of Buenos Aires
- Occupation: Writer

I Acevedo (Napaleofú, b. 1983) is an Argentine transgender activist and writer. He earned a Bachelor of Arts from the University of Buenos Aires and is former co-director of the digital publishing house La Colección. He published the autobiographical novel Una idea genial, a sci-fi novel (Quedate conmigo) and the stories Ja ja ja, Late un corazón and Paquete de Fe. He also has digital publications.

== Biography ==
Born in Napaleofú, a town near Tandil, I Acevedo started to write in childhood. One of his published stories was written in 1998 and he was a winner in the Torneos Juveniles Bonaerenses that year. When he was 18, he moved to Buenos Aires and settled in the city. In 2010 he published the autobiography Una idea genial (Mansalva), in which he said that his first partner was 70 years old.

He worked for several years in a bakery and years later published Panadera through the digital publishing house La Colección, where he was codirector.

I Acevedo transitioned in 2018, adopting a masculine gender identity.

== Works ==
=== Novels ===
- Una idea genial (2010)
- Quedate conmigo (2017)

=== Stories ===
- Ja Ja Ja (2017)
- Late un corazón (2019)
- Paquete de Fe (2020)

=== Diaries ===
- Diario de los quince (2022)

=== Essays ===
- Horas robadas al sueño (2019)

=== Digital Publications ===
- Panadera (2015)
