= Joaquín Indacoechea =

Argentine footballer

Personal information
- Full name: Joaquín Indacoechea
- Date of birth: 8 September 2000 (age 26)
- Place of birth: San Manuel, Argentina
- Position: Midfielder

Team information
- Current team: Círculo Deportivo

Youth career
- –2015: Atlético San Manuel
- 2015: Los Patos de Balcarce
- 2015: Gimnasia de Tandil
- 2016: Atlético San Manuel
- 2016–2018: Aldosivi

Senior career*
Years	Team	Apps	(Gls)
2018–2024	Aldosivi	60	(0)
2025–	Círculo Deportivo	1	(0)
- * Club domestic league appearances and goals as of 17:35, 22 March 2025 (UTC)

Joaquín Indacoechea (born 8 September 2000) is an Argentine professional footballer who plays as a midfielder for Círculo Deportivo.

== Club career ==
In 2015, Indacoechea was diagnosed with Burkitt's lymphoma, a rare lymphatic cancer. He fully recovered in 2016, and returned to football with Aldosivi. Indacoechea made his professional debut with Aldosivi in a 5-1 Argentine Primera División loss to Rosario Central on 26 November 2019.
