= Anahí Ballent =

Argentine architect

- Born: 1956 (age 69–70); Tandil, Argentina
- Education: National University of La Plata
- Occupation: Architect

Anahí Ballent (born 1956) is an Argentine architect whose research focuses on human habitation in Argentina. She is a professor at the National University of Quilmes and has been a full member of CONICET since 1998. She obtained a degree in architecture from the National University of La Plata's Faculty of Architecture and Urban Planning in 1981 and a Ph.D. in history from the University of Buenos Aires in 1997.

Ballent is the author of over 30 book chapters and four books.

== Career ==
Ballent began her career as a technical secretary at the Mario J. Buschiazzo Institute of American Art and Aesthetic Research from 1989 to 1990, cooperating with Martha Levisman in preparing an exhibit on Le Corbusier for his 60th birthday.
