= Juan Eluchans =

Argentine footballer (born 1980)

Personal information
- Full name: Juan Eduardo Eluchans
- Date of birth: April 14, 1980 (age 46)
- Place of birth: Tandil, Argentina
- Height: 1.78 m (5 ft 10 in)
- Position: Left midfielder

Youth career
- Independiente

Senior career*
Years	Team	Apps	(Gls)
2000–2007	Independiente	203	(8)
2006	→ Rosario Central (loan)	23	(0)
2007–2009	SM Caen	114	(18)
2010–2011	Universidad Católica	44	(7)
2011–2012	Banfield	30	(1)
2012–2015	Atlético Rafaela	123	(13)
2016–2017	Guaraní Antonio Franco	46	(6)
2020–2021	Atlético Posadas	48	(8)
- * Club domestic league appearances and goals

Juan Eduardo Eluchans (born 14 April 1980) is an Argentine former footballer who played as a left midfielder.

== Club career ==
=== SM Caen ===
In June 2007, Eluchans was transferred to Ligue 1 side SM Caen, signing a two-year contract in a €1 million deal. His league debut came on 4 August against Nice. He scored his first goal for the club in a 2–2 draw with Sochaux. After several weeks of adaptation, Eluchans conquered the fans of the team and fully participated in the club season.

=== Universidad Católica ===
Eluchans signed for the Chilean Primera División side Universidad Católica on 26 June 2010, agreeing on a one-year deal, and keeping him with the precordilleran club until winter 2011. He made his debut in a league game against Cobreloa in a 2–1 home win. Eluchans failed to have a good performance in the team during his first games in the club, but at the end of the tournament he achieved a good performance in the position of left back.

On 27 November 2010, Católica gain a crucial victory 3–2 at Calama to Cobreloa in the penultimate week of the league tournament, beating Colo-Colo in top-of-the-table by 3 points. In the same game, Eluchans scored the victory goal, after a free kick at 89th minute. In the next game, his club was proclaimed champion of the Chilean football after beat 5–0 to Everton.

In 2011, Eluchans achieved a good performance at Católica, scoring three important goals for the club, among themselves two goals of free kick against Santiago Wanderers and Colo-Colo. He became a key player during the team's good season. Because his performances, he received several offers from important clubs of South America.

However, his team loss the final of the playoffs championship against Universidad de Chile, Católica lost in the aggregate result for 4–3 loss, and Eluchans along with his teammates Rodrigo Valenzuela, Alfonso Parot and Francisco Pizarro protagonized a scandal insulting to the referee Enrique Osses.

=== Banfield ===
After his successful pass at Católica, Eluchans was released of the Chilean club and shortly after he joined to Banfield of the Argentine Primera División.

On 5 August 2011, Eluchans made his debut for Banfield in the 2–0 loss against Atlético Rafaela.

== Honours ==
=== Club ===
Independiente

- Primera División Argentina (1): 2002 Apertura

Universidad Católica

- Primera División de Chile (1): 2010
