= Iris Pavón =

Argentine writer (1906–1951)

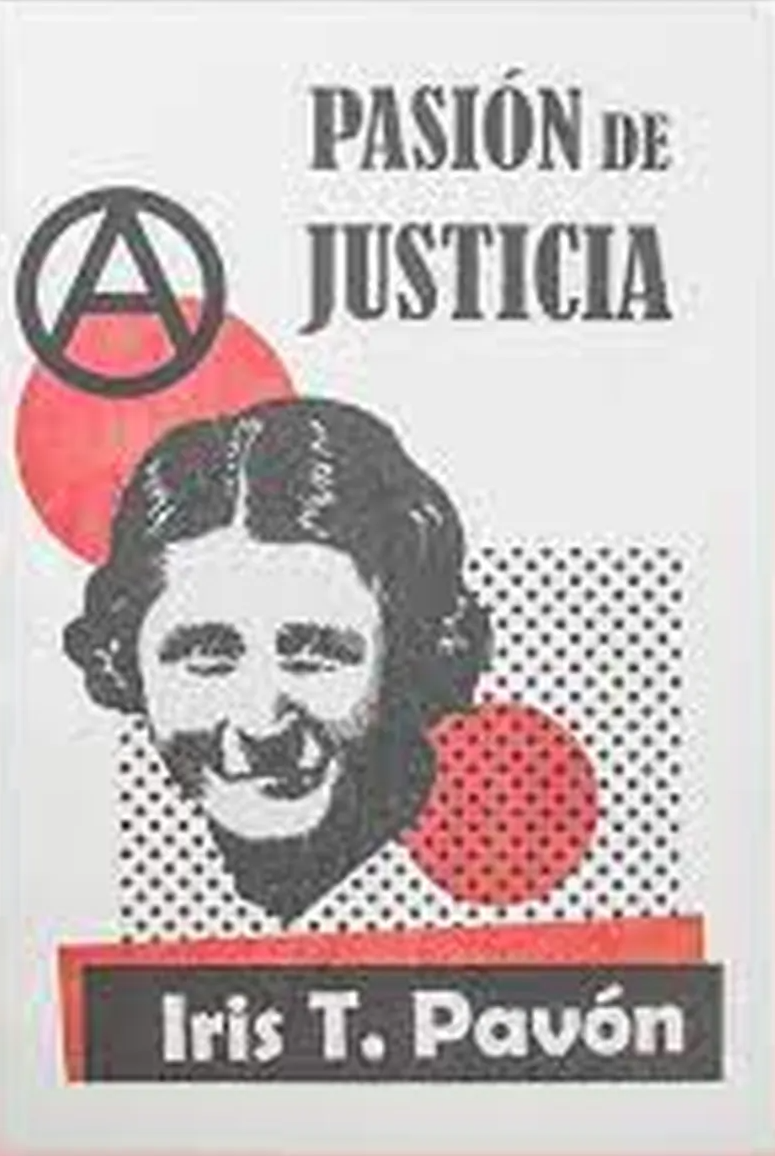
The cover of Iris Pavon's poetry book c. 1953

Iris Pavón (1906–1951) was an Argentine poet and writer.

== Life ==
Pavón was born in 1906 in the small pampas town of Loberia. She later relocated to Deán Funes, Cordoba and then to Cruz del Eje, where she came to maturity as a writer.

Anarchist in her beliefs, Pavón was very vocal on issues of social justice. She took up the pen on behalf of the Bragado case of 1931 and the Sacco-Vanzetti case in the US. She contributed to radical journals such as Reconstruir. She was imprisoned in 1944 alongside her partner Marcos Dukelsky.

Among her poems is "Huesos", dedicated to a worker who died during the construction of the Cruz del Eje dam. A collection of her texts, from the 1920s to the 1940s, was published two years after her death under the title Pasión de Justicia. It was reprinted in 2019.

She died in September 1951.
