= Piedra Movediza =

Former balancing rock in Argentina

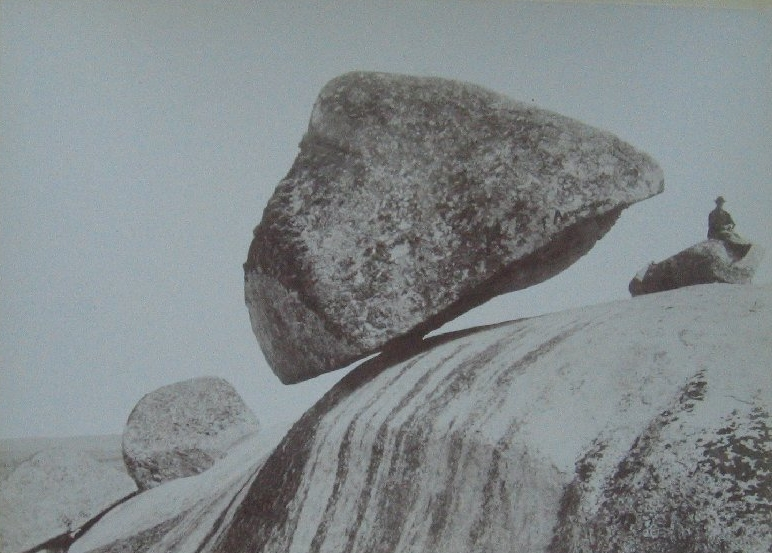
The stone, c. 1890

Piedra Movediza (lit. 'Moving Stone') was a balancing rock located in Tandil, Buenos Aires Province, Argentina. It weighed about 300 tons. It attracted attention and tourists because of the way it was balanced on the edge of a hill. The stone fell and broke on 29 February 1912. Some sources say it fell due to vandalism or vibrations caused by explosions in a nearby quarry.

== History ==
La Piedra Movediza was located on the top of La Movediza hill, at the coordinates 37°18′34″S 59°10′00″W.

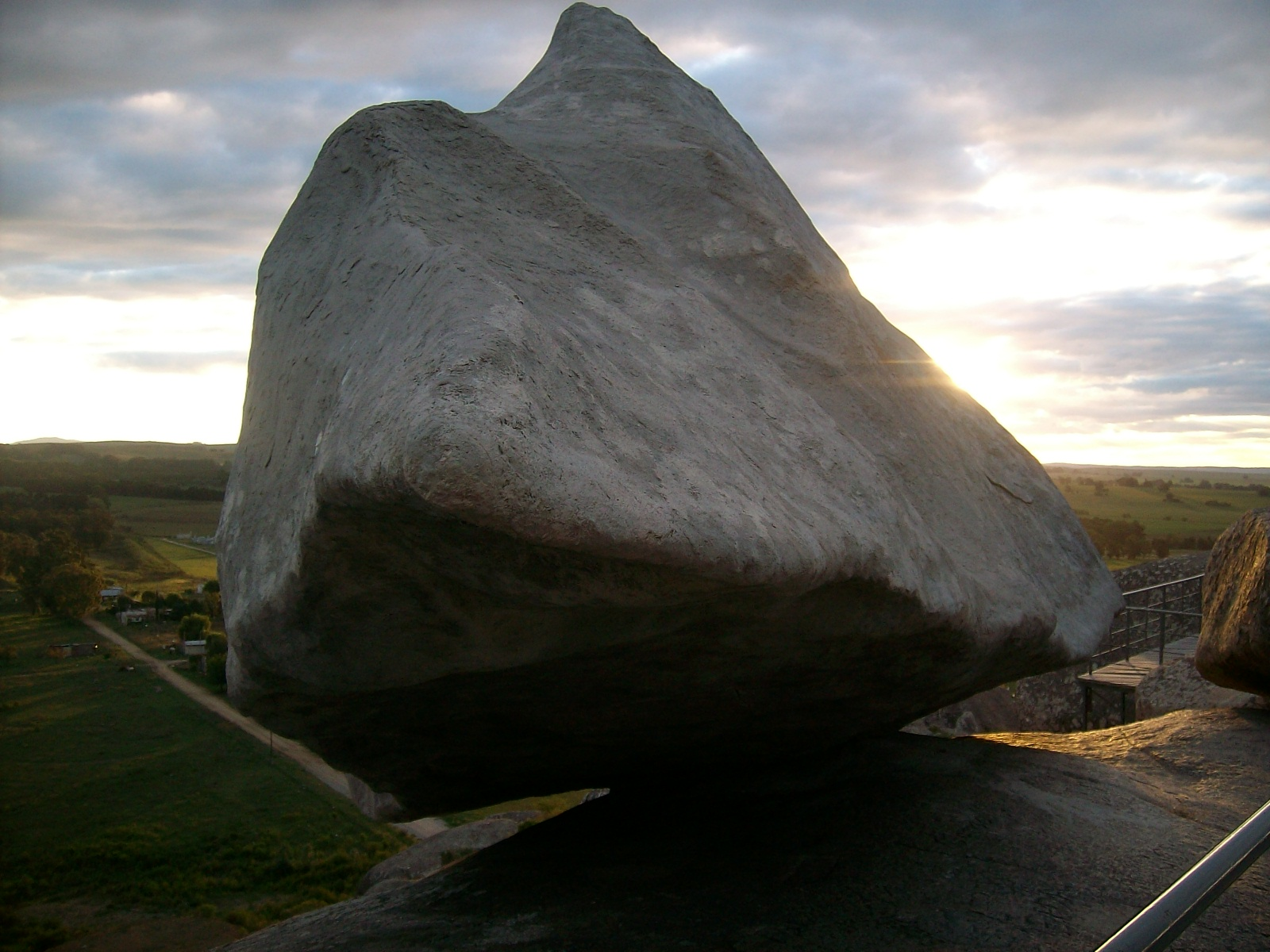
Replica of the stone, installed 2007.

The stone rocked from morning to evening in a very slow fashion, imperceptible to the eye. People would place glass bottles under the bottom of the rock, only to see them smashed later in the day.

The stone fell and broke on 29 February 1912, between 5 and 6 p.m. The true time and cause of the fall are unknown.

One theory for the cause of the fall was that quarrymen were annoyed with tourist visits to the area. Another possibility was that it fell due to vibrations from blasting of the bore in the quarries nearby. After the fall, an eyewitness (the wife of the mine's manager) said that a group of people had been rocking the stone that afternoon. Its fall was probably eased by an 1848 lightning strike, which hit the stone and flaked off a portion of its mass. No official reason for its fall was issued.

Various proposals were floated to move the three segments of the broken stone to the hill and re-cement them into position, but nothing was agreed upon. In 2007, a copy of the stone was put in the same place where the original was situated, and is considered a historical symbol of Tandil. This place was named "Parque Lítico La Movediza". The replica does not move, being securely fixed into the supporting rock.

== See also ==
- List of individual rocks
