= Quequén Grande River =

River in Argentina

Coordinates: 38°30′33″S 58°44′03″W

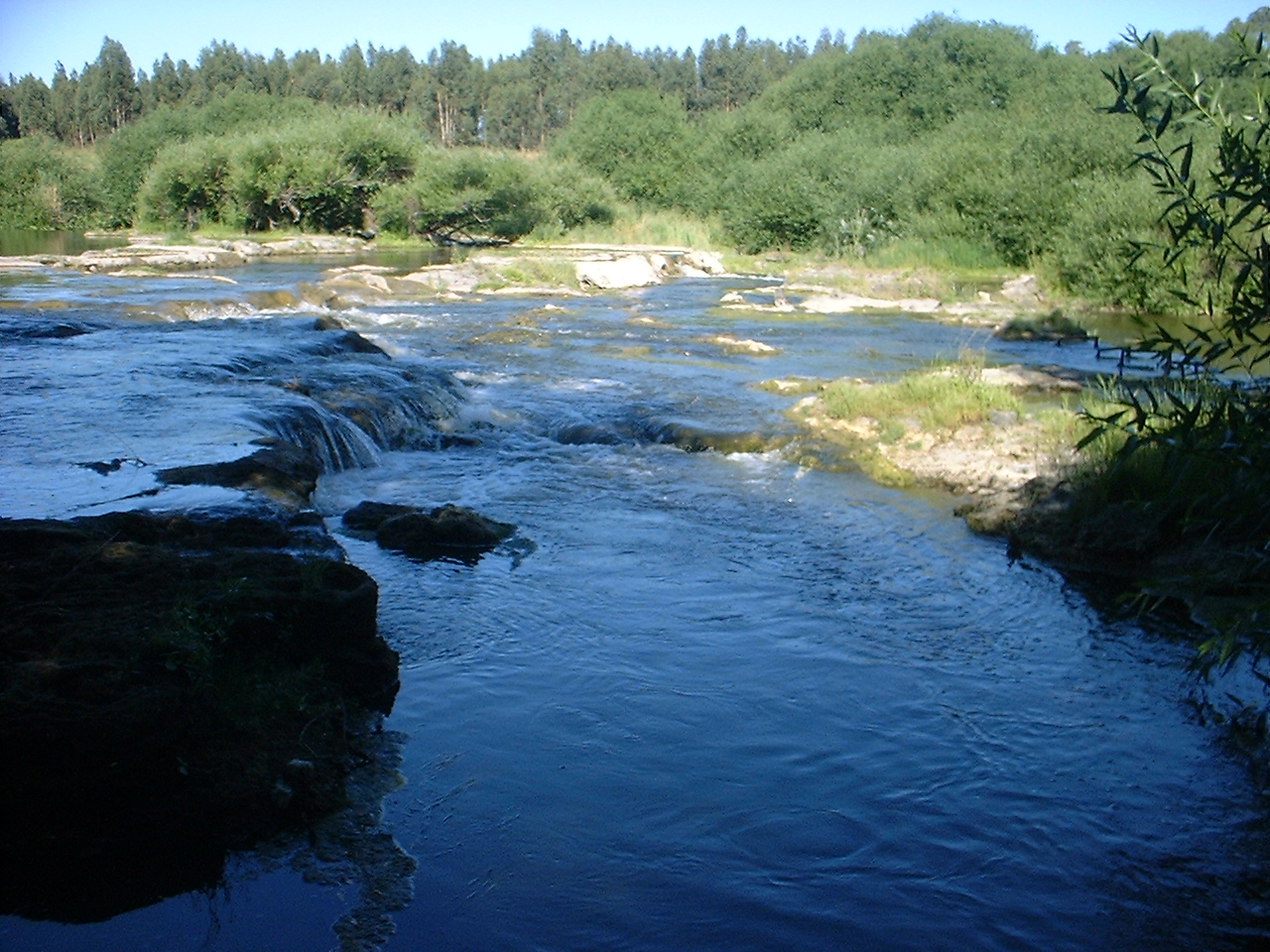

- Location of mouth

Location
- Country: Argentina

Physical characteristics
- Source
  - location: Benito Juárez, Buenos Aires
- Mouth
  - location: Necochea
- Length: 180 kilometres (110 mi)
- Basin size: 9,914 square kilometres (3,828 mi^{2})

The Quequén Grande River is located in southeastern Buenos Aires Province, Argentina. Its mouth flows into the Atlantic Ocean, along the eastern border of the resort city of Necochea. Discovered in 1748 by Jesuit missionaries José Cardiel and Thomas Falkner, they originally named the waterway San José; its eventual name originated from the gününa iajëch Kem Kem ("gully"). The port of Quequén, located at the mouth of the river, in the neighboring town of the same name, was established in 1922. The facility handles over 3 million tons of freight annually and is a major rail head for Argentine grain exports. One of only two existing suspension bridges in Argentina, the Hipólito Yrigoyen Bridge (1929), spans the river at Necochea.

== See also ==
- List of rivers of Argentina
