= Balcarce Partido =

Balcarce Partido de Balcarce
- Department
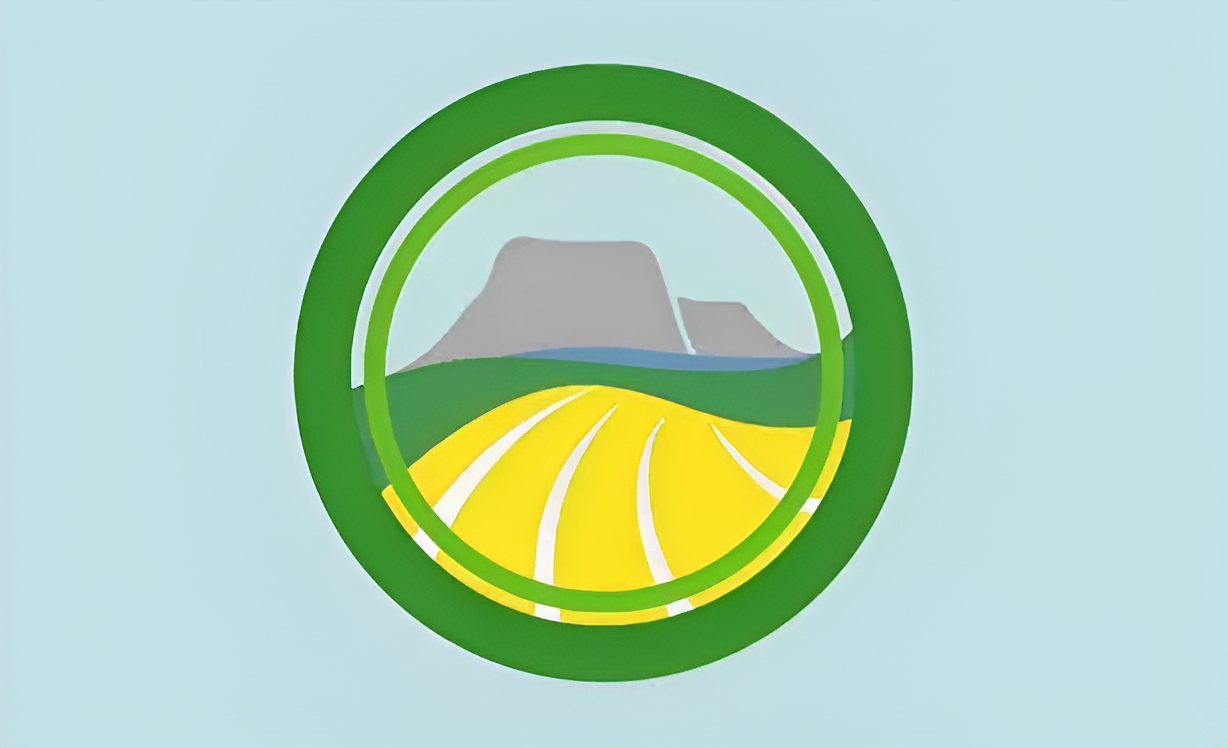
- Flag Emblem

- Location of Balcarce Partido in Buenos Aires Province
- Coordinates: 37°52′S 58°15′W
- Country: Argentina
- Established: 1865
- Seat: Balcarce

Government
  - Intendant: Esteban Reino (UCR-Cambiemos)

Area
  - Total: 4,120 km^{2} (1,590 sq mi)

Population
  - Total: 42,040
  - Density: 10.2/km^{2} (26.4/sq mi)
- Demonym: balcarceño
- Postal Code: B7620
- IFAM: BUE009
- Area Code: 02266
- Patron saint: San José
- Website: www.balcarce.gov.ar

Balcarce Partido is a partido of Buenos Aires Province in Argentina.

The provincial subdivision has a population of 42,040 inhabitants in an area of 4,120 km^{2} (1,590 sq mi), and its capital city is Balcarce, which is around 410 km (255 mi) from Buenos Aires.

== Name ==
The partido is named after Antonio González de Balcarce (1774-1819), an Argentine military commander, governor of Buenos Aires and Supreme Director (president) of Argentina in 1816.

== Economy ==
The economy of Balcarce Partido is dominated by agriculture. Other economic activities include mineral extraction and tourism.

Farming is dominated by the production of arable crops and potatoes.

The impact of modern farming techniques and mining has damaged the natural habitats of indigenous species such as emu, jackrabbit, viscacha and armadillo.

Balcarce is home to Argentina's National Institute of Agricultural Technology, Instituto Nacional de Tecnología Agropecuaria (INTA) and the faculty of agrarian sciences, Facultad de Ciencias Agrarias de la Universidad Nacional de Mar del Plata.

== Attractions ==
- Autódromo Juan Manuel Fangio
- Juan Manuel Fangio Museum

== Settlements ==
- Balcarce
- San Agustín
- Los Pinos
- Napaleofú
- Bosch
- Ramos Otero
- Villa Laguna La Brava.
