= Tandil =

- City
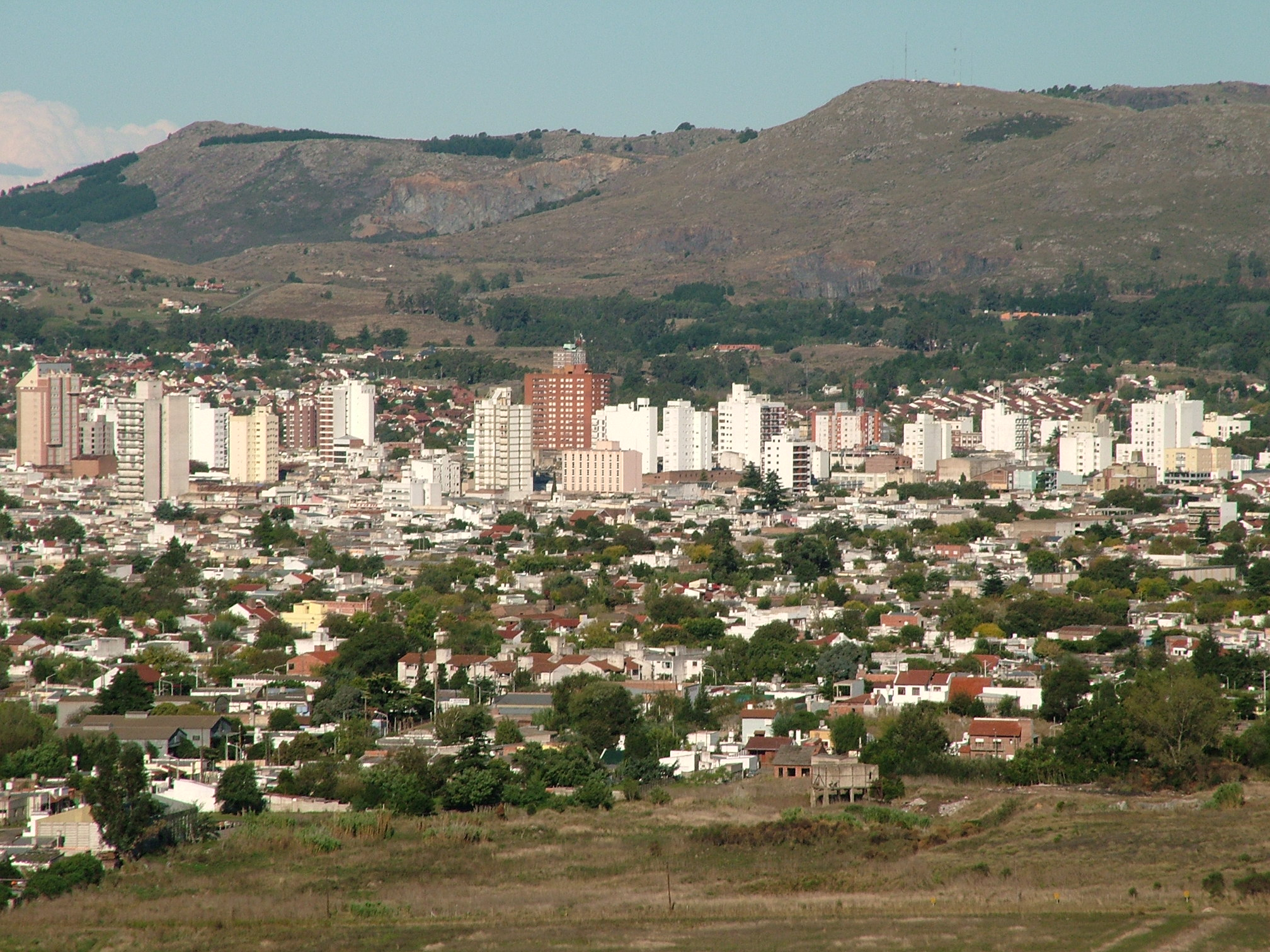
- Panoramic view of the city

- Location in Argentina Tandil (Buenos Aires Province)
- Coordinates: 37°19′S 59°08′W
- Country: Argentina
- Province: Buenos Aires
- Partido: Tandil
- Founded: April 4, 1823

Area
  - Total: 52.34 km^{2} (20.21 sq mi)
- Elevation: 188 m (617 ft)

Population (2022 census)
  - Total: 145,575
  - Density: 2,781/km^{2} (7,204/sq mi)
- CPA Base: B 7000
- Area code: +54 249
- Website: www.tandil.gov.ar

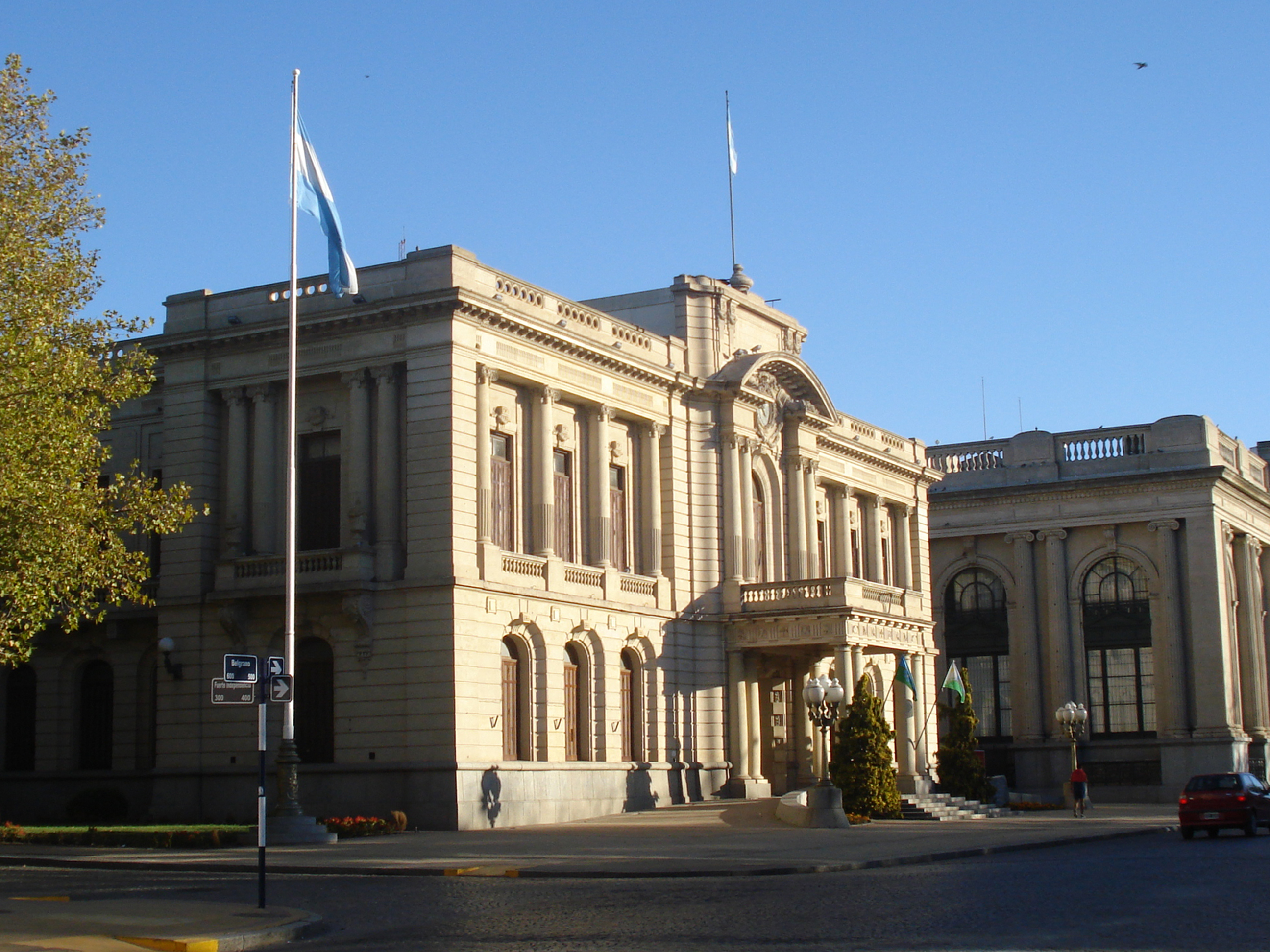
City Hall

Tandil is the main city of the homonymous partido (department), located in Argentina, in the southeast of Buenos Aires Province, just north-northwest of Tandilia hills. The city was founded in 1823, and its name originates from the Piedra Movediza ("Moving Stone") which fell in 1912. The city is the birthplace of many notable sports personalities, as well as former president of Argentina Mauricio Macri.

== Geography ==
Tandil is located 180 metres (590 ft) above sea level and its coordinates are 37°19′08″S 59°08′05″W. The city borders Rauch and Azul (to the north), Ayacucho and Balcarce (to the east), Lobería, Necochea and Benito Juárez (to the south) and Azul and Benito Juárez (to the west).

Tandil is situated approximately midway between La Plata (the provincial capital), 330 km (210 mi) to its NE, and Bahía Blanca, lying the same distance to its SW; it is also 160 kilometres (99 mi) NW of Mar del Plata, and 360 kilometres (220 mi) SSW of Buenos Aires. Tandil is in a zone within the Pampas known as the Humid Pampas.

According to the 2022 census (INDEC), Tandil had a population of 145,575. The total area of the Tandil partido is 4,935 km^{2} (1,905 sq mi).

=== Climate ===
Tandil's climate is mild and humid (classified as Cfb or an oceanic climate under the Köppen climate classification), with an average temperature of 13.8 °C (56.8 °F) and 888.6 millimetres (34.98 in) of precipitation annually. Mornings are often cold in autumn, winter and spring, and generally fresh in the summer. Fog is very common in autumn and winter, when frosts are also common. Minimum temperatures below −5 °C (23 °F) have been recorded in the winter months. Rainfall occurs throughout the year but more frequently in summer. Snow is not very common.

The climatological data in the table below is from the period 1991–2020:

Climate data for Tandil, Argentina (1991–2020, extremes 1961–present)
Month	Jan	Feb	Mar	Apr	May	Jun	Jul	Aug	Sep	Oct	Nov	Dec	Year
Record high °C (°F)	40.7 (105.3)	37.8 (100.0)	37.2 (99.0)	32.5 (90.5)	28.0 (82.4)	23.3 (73.9)	25.4 (77.7)	31.2 (88.2)	30.0 (86.0)	33.6 (92.5)	35.4 (95.7)	39.9 (103.8)	40.7 (105.3)
Mean daily maximum °C (°F)	28.4 (83.1)	26.9 (80.4)	24.5 (76.1)	20.5 (68.9)	16.5 (61.7)	13.3 (55.9)	12.5 (54.5)	15.0 (59.0)	16.9 (62.4)	19.9 (67.8)	23.4 (74.1)	27.0 (80.6)	20.4 (68.7)
Daily mean °C (°F)	20.8 (69.4)	19.6 (67.3)	17.4 (63.3)	13.5 (56.3)	10.2 (50.4)	7.2 (45.0)	6.2 (43.2)	8.2 (46.8)	10.2 (50.4)	13.3 (55.9)	16.4 (61.5)	19.5 (67.1)	13.5 (56.3)
Mean daily minimum °C (°F)	13.3 (55.9)	12.7 (54.9)	11.0 (51.8)	7.4 (45.3)	4.8 (40.6)	2.0 (35.6)	1.1 (34.0)	2.4 (36.3)	3.9 (39.0)	6.8 (44.2)	9.3 (48.7)	11.6 (52.9)	7.2 (45.0)
Record low °C (°F)	1.8 (35.2)	0.8 (33.4)	0.0 (32.0)	−4.6 (23.7)	−5.8 (21.6)	−11.0 (12.2)	−11.6 (11.1)	−8.5 (16.7)	−7.1 (19.2)	−4.8 (23.4)	−4.0 (24.8)	−0.3 (31.5)	−11.6 (11.1)
Average precipitation mm (inches)	108.8 (4.28)	98.5 (3.88)	91.6 (3.61)	93.5 (3.68)	56.0 (2.20)	48.6 (1.91)	41.1 (1.62)	57.5 (2.26)	58.7 (2.31)	85.9 (3.38)	98.4 (3.87)	74.0 (2.91)	912.6 (35.93)
Average precipitation days (≥ 0.1 mm)	7.9	7.1	7.6	7.3	6.0	5.4	6.3	5.4	6.9	8.7	8.8	7.2	84.6
Average snowy days	0.0	0.0	0.0	0.0	0.1	0.1	0.1	0.1	0.0	0.0	0.0	0.0	0.2
Average relative humidity (%)	67.0	72.8	76.9	78.3	81.6	80.5	80.2	75.9	74.4	73.8	69.7	64.6	74.6
Mean monthly sunshine hours	254.2	240.1	220.1	186.0	142.6	114.0	127.1	164.3	159.0	213.9	231.0	232.5	2,284.8
Mean daily sunshine hours	8.2	8.5	7.1	6.2	4.6	3.8	4.1	5.3	5.3	6.9	7.7	7.5	6.3
Percentage possible sunshine	59.1	63.7	58.4	49.1	46.2	37.2	42.4	52.2	46.7	53.7	53.6	49.9	51.0
Source: Servicio Meteorológico Nacional (percent sun 1991–2000)

== Place name ==
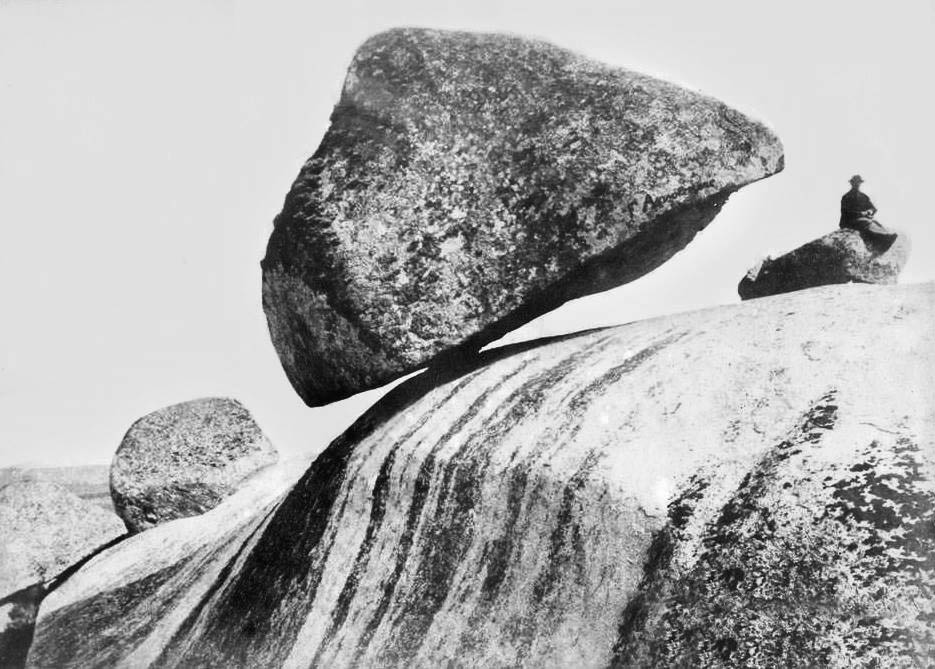
Piedra Movediza ("Moving Stone"), c. 1890

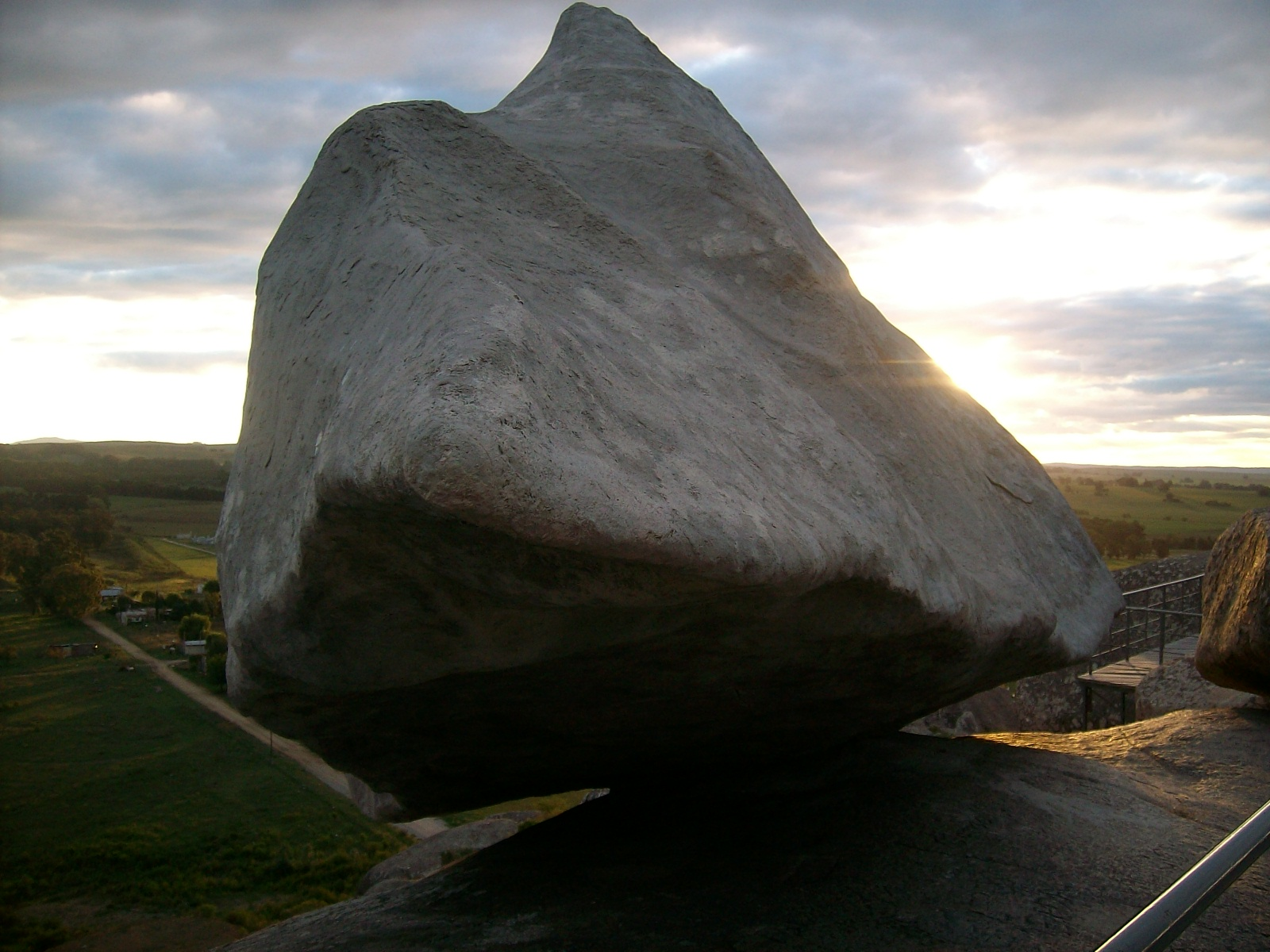
Replica of the Piedra Movediza installed in 2007

It is widely believed that the name of the city comes from the Mapuche words tan ("falling"), and lil ("rock"). It is probably a reference to the Piedra Movediza ("Moving Stone"), a large boulder which stood seemingly miraculously balanced on the edge of a rocky foothill. In order to demonstrate the slight movements of the boulder, it was common practice to place bottles under its base to watch them shatter. The "Moving Stone" toppled on February 29, 1912, and split into two pieces at the bottom of the hill.

In May 2007, a fix replica was set up in the same place where the original stood. The replica, made by engineering students, is actually cemented in place and does not teeter the way the original did.

== History ==
The town was founded by Martín Rodríguez on April 4, 1823, named Fuerte Independencia (Fort Independence). In time the original natives became assimilated and mingled with the increasing European population. The vast majority of immigrants came from Spain and Italy, but also Danish people settled mainly guided by the Danish College of Missions, the latter constituting a very active community. Tandil was designated a city (although by modern standards it was a large town) in 1895 and became a popular tourist destination attracting people from Buenos Aires and other parts of Argentina.

The Piedra Movediza fell in 1912 and split in two below. Although it is impossible after the fact to ascertain the reason it fell, it is possible that the balanced rock was thrown off balance by the common practice of placing glass bottles under it and watching them explode. This was the way the locals would prove to visitors that the rock moved, since the movement was too subtle to be detected by the naked eye. There have been projects to restore the rock, and a replica stone was placed where the original used to be. Other similar stones like El Centinela are also attractions, but none has the quality of teetering like the "moving rock" once did.

=== 1872 massacre ===
In the early morning of January 1st, 1872, a massacre against European immigrants took place in the city, instigated by a man known as Gerónimo G. Solané, who was also known as Tata Dios (Spanish for "Grandfather God"), a gaucho from either Entre Ríos or Santiago del Estero, who presented himself as a healer and prophet. In his name, several dozen gauchos had killed 36 immigrants.

== National University of Central Buenos Aires Province ==
The National University of Central Buenos Aires Province (Universidad Nacional del Centro de la Provincia Buenos Aires) is a public university located in Tandil. It was founded in 1974 as part of University of Buenos Aires Professor Alberto Taquini's plan to geographically diversify Argentina's National University system.

Established with the unification of a private school and a campus of the National University of the South, with more than 11,000 students, the university includes 10 schools offering 21 undergraduate, 58 graduate, and 19 post-graduate degrees. It maintains secondary campuses in Azul and Olavarría.

== Notable people ==
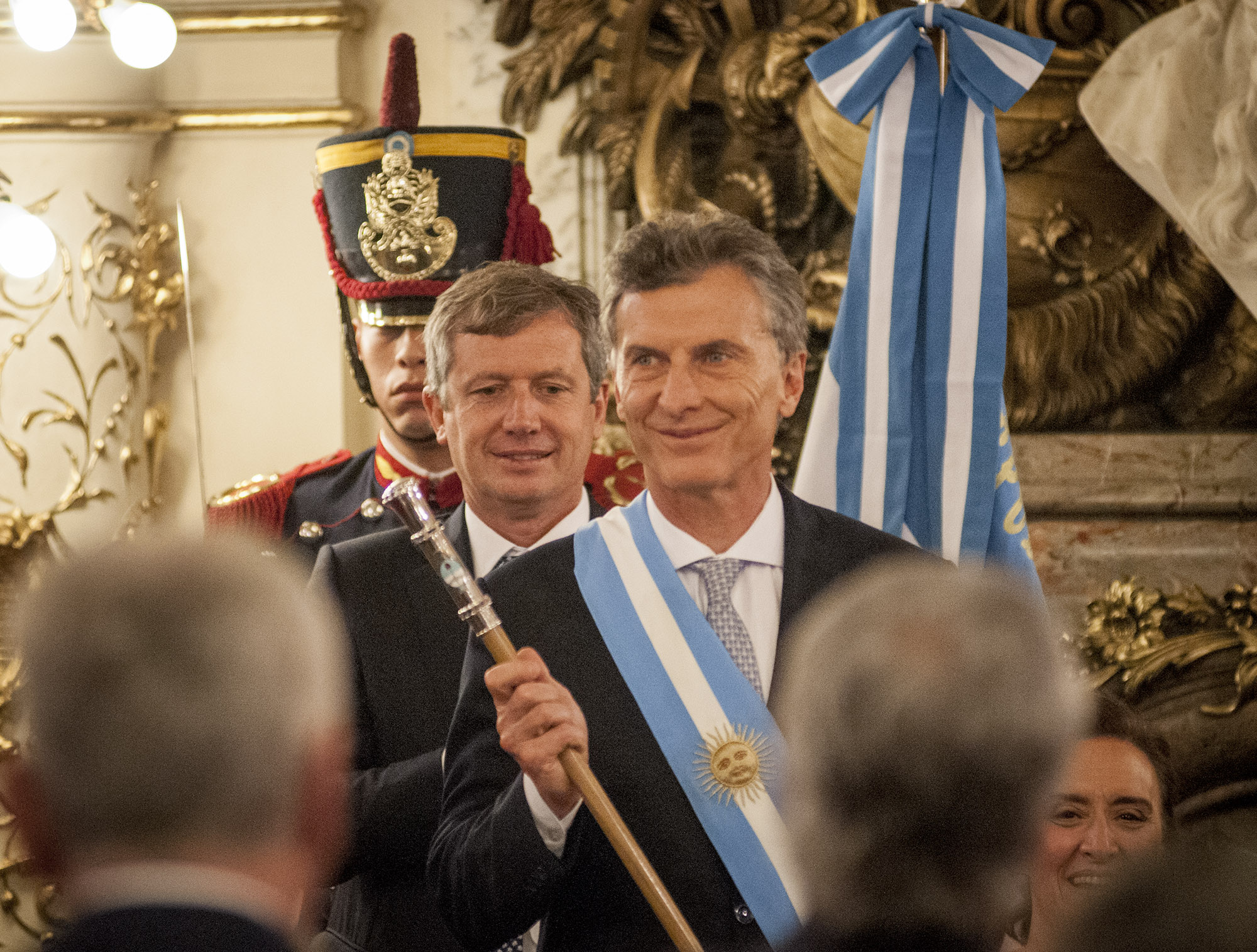
Argentina's president Mauricio Macri was born in Tandil

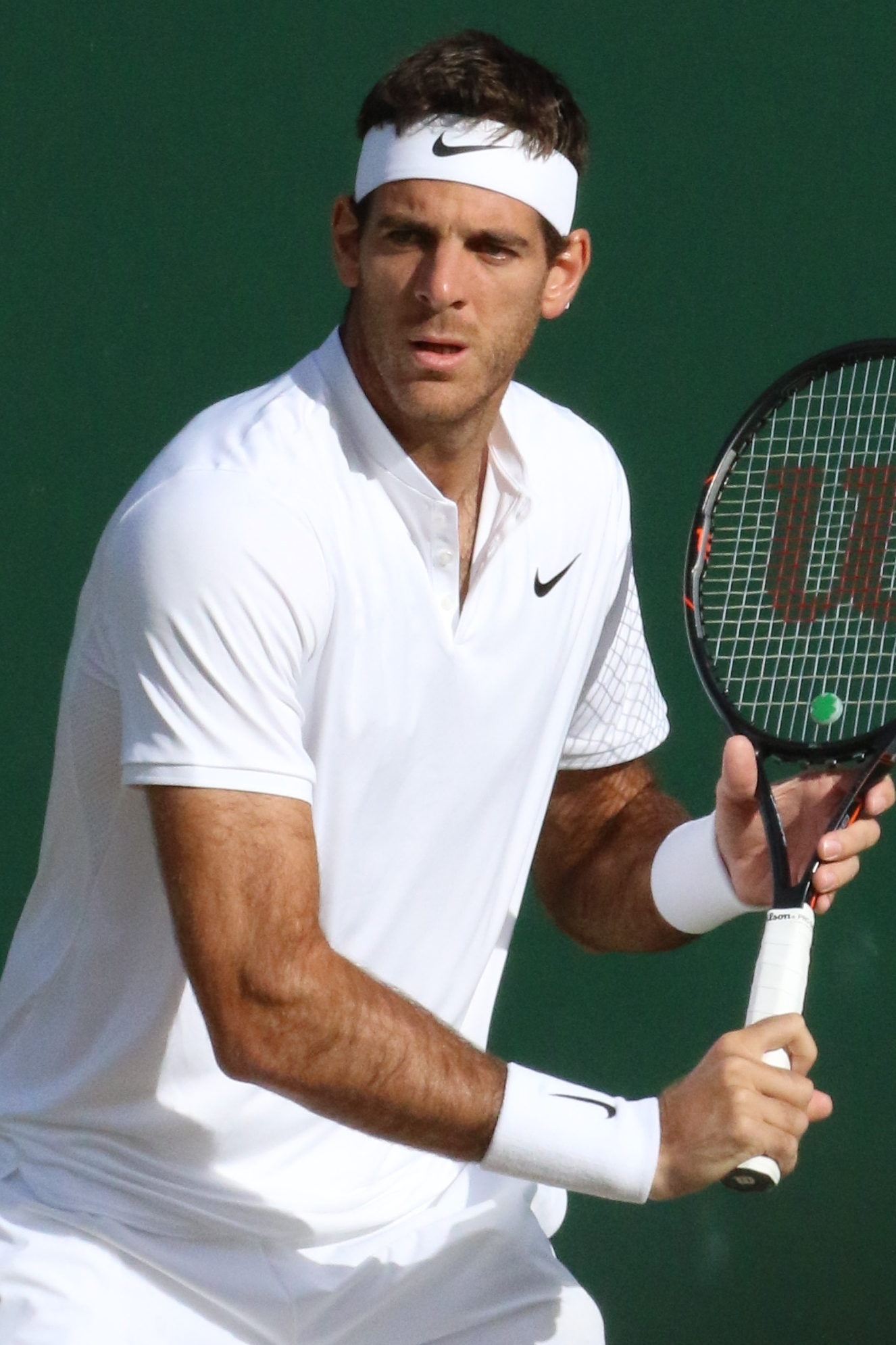
Juan Martín del Potro is a well known sport personality from the city

- Anahí Ballent (born 1956) - architect

=== Arts ===
- Facundo Cabral, singer, artist
- Rodolfo González Pacheco, writer, playwright, orator, anarchist journalist and activist
- María Cristina Kiehr, soprano
- Víctor Laplace, actor
- René Lavand, illusionist
- Robert Le Vigan, French actor and Nazi collaborator
- Carmen Platero, playwright and actress

=== Politics ===
- Diego Bossio, economist, executive director of ANSES, the national social security agency, from 2009 to 2015
- Mauricio Macri, politician, former president of Argentina

=== Sports ===
- Juan Martín del Potro, tennis player, 2009 US Open winner and bronze and silver medalist in the Summer Olympics, nicknamed the 'Tower of Tandil'
- Mauro Camoranesi, footballer, 2006 FIFA World Cup Champion with the Italian national team
- María Irigoyen, tennis player
- Matias Rueda, Latin, South American and Argentine champion of professional boxing
- Juan Eduardo Eluchans, football player
- Guillermo Pérez Roldán, tennis player
- Mariana Pérez Roldán, tennis player
- Ariel Garcé, football player
- Esteban Saveljich, football player
- Mariano Pernía, football player
- Jorge Iván Pérez, football player
- Alejandro Agustín Domenez, football player
- Mariano González, football player
- Pablo Andrés González, football player
- Vicente Pernía, football player
- Máximo González, tennis player
- Diego Junqueira, tennis player
- Juan Mónaco, tennis player
- Bernardo Daniel Romeo, football player
- Mariano Zabaleta, tennis player
- Jorge Baliño, football referee, former FIFA-listed.

== Gallery ==
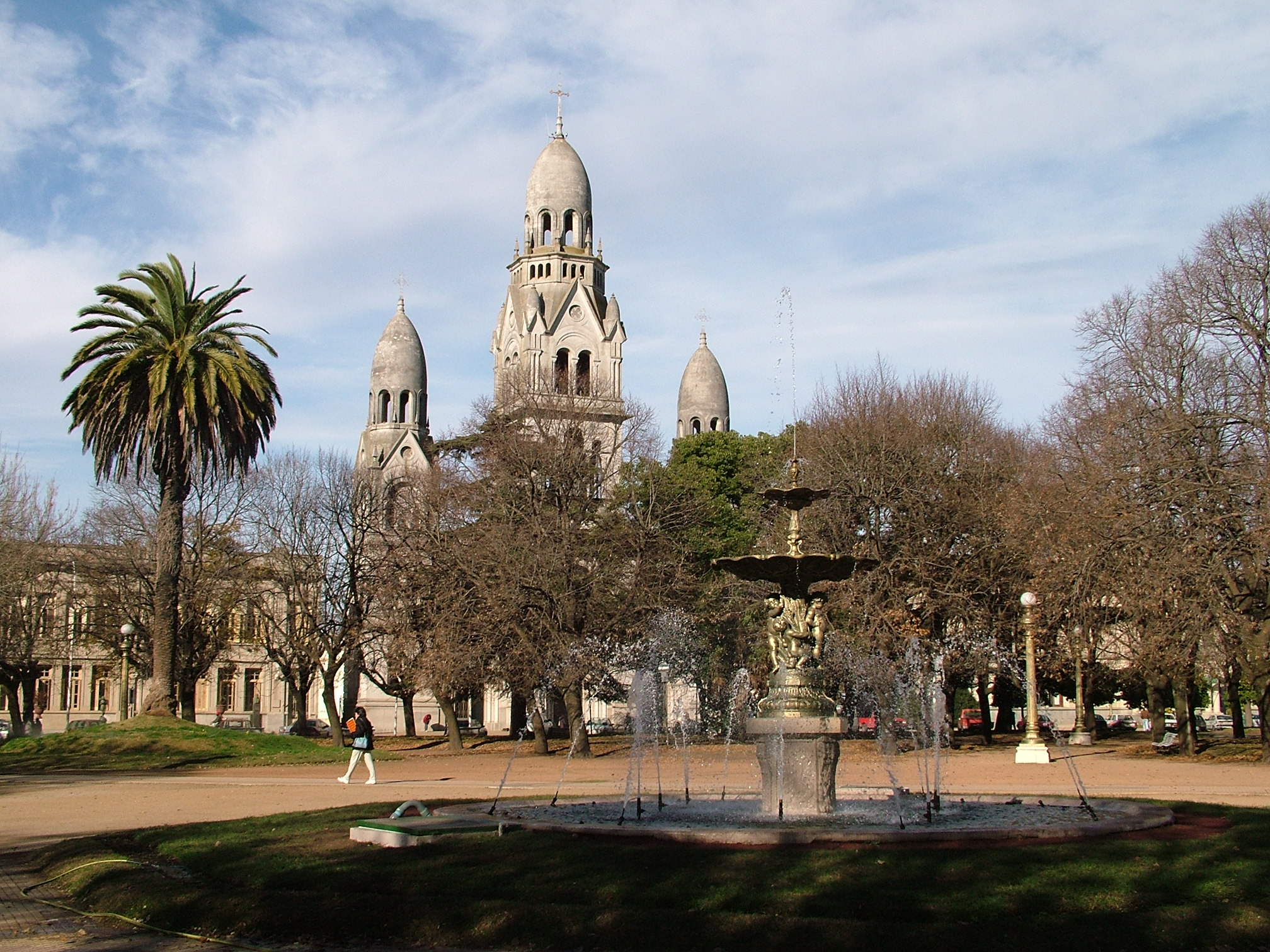
Plaza Independencia (Independence Square)

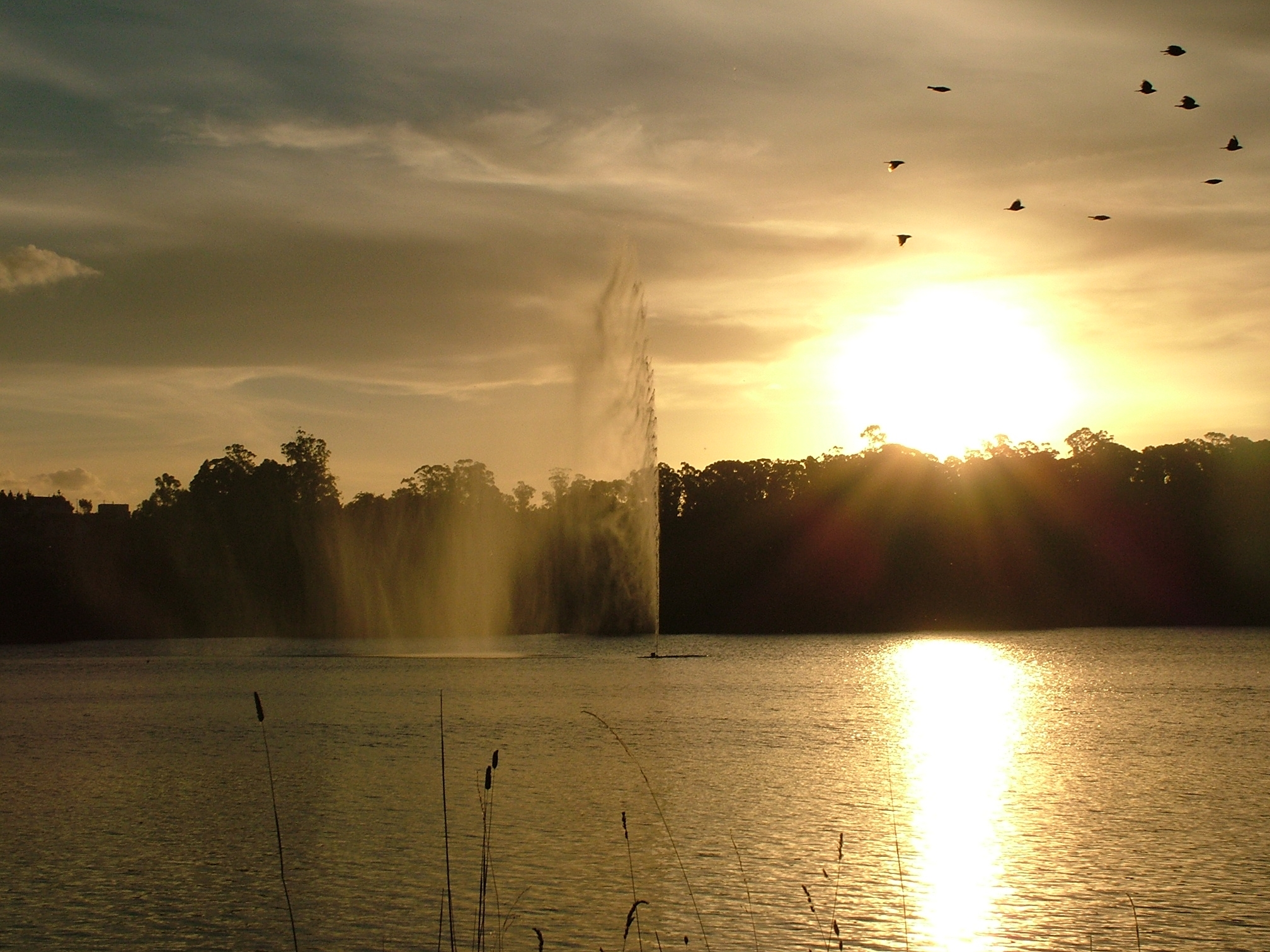
Lago del Fuerte (Fortress Lake), with its artificial geyser

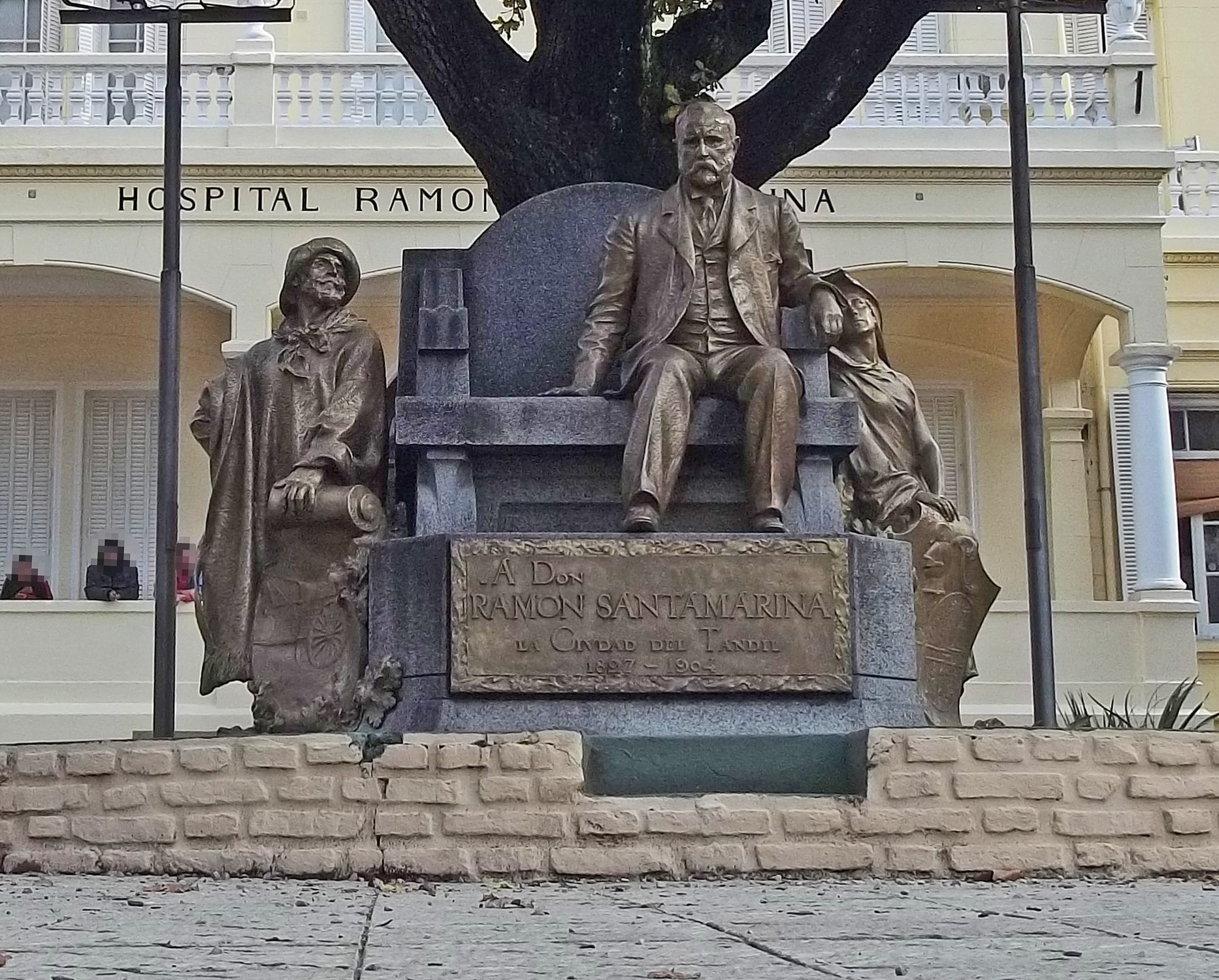
Statue outside Ramón Santamarina hospital

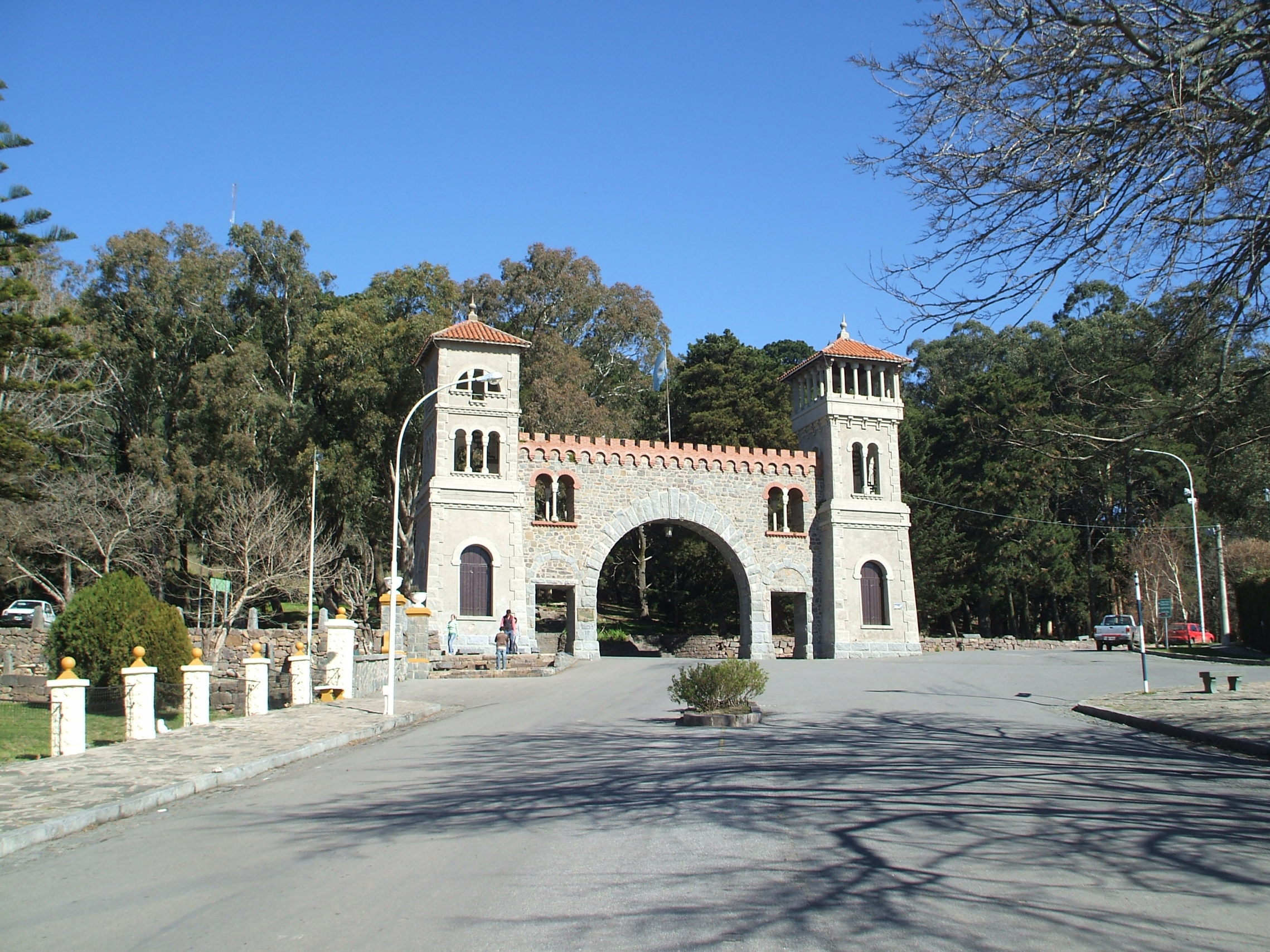
Entrance to Independence Park

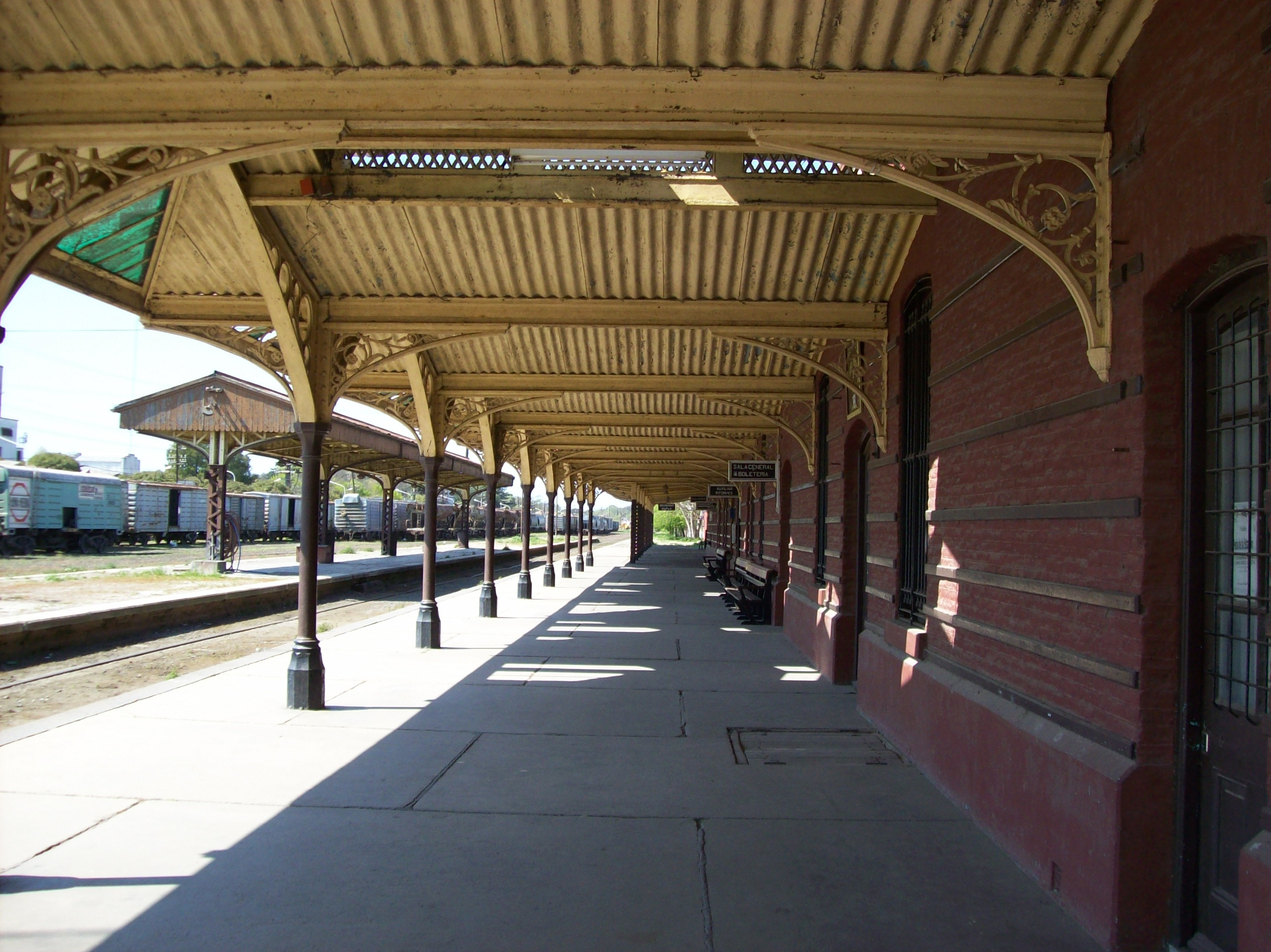
Railway station platform (Roca Railway)

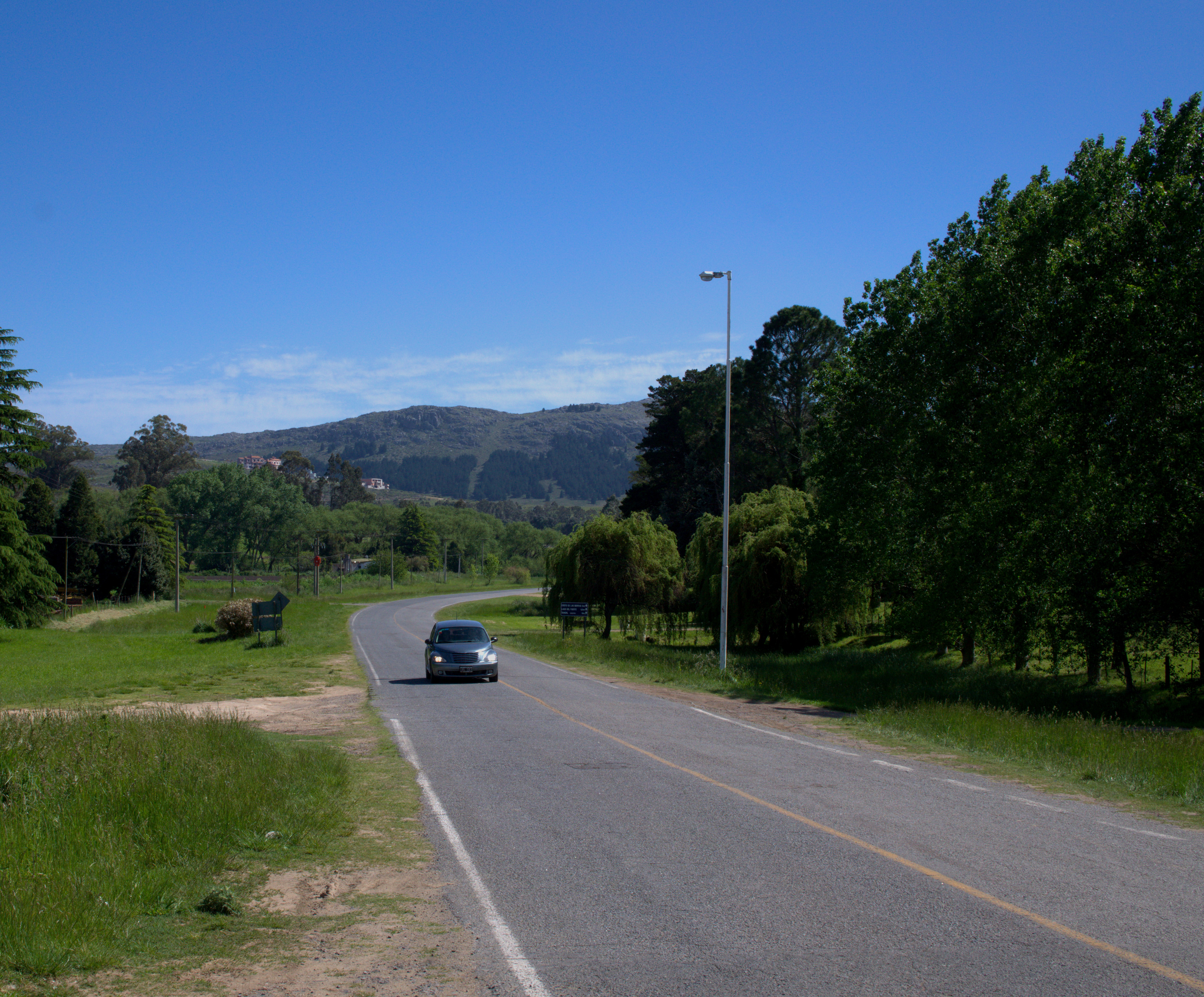
The city's rural surroundings

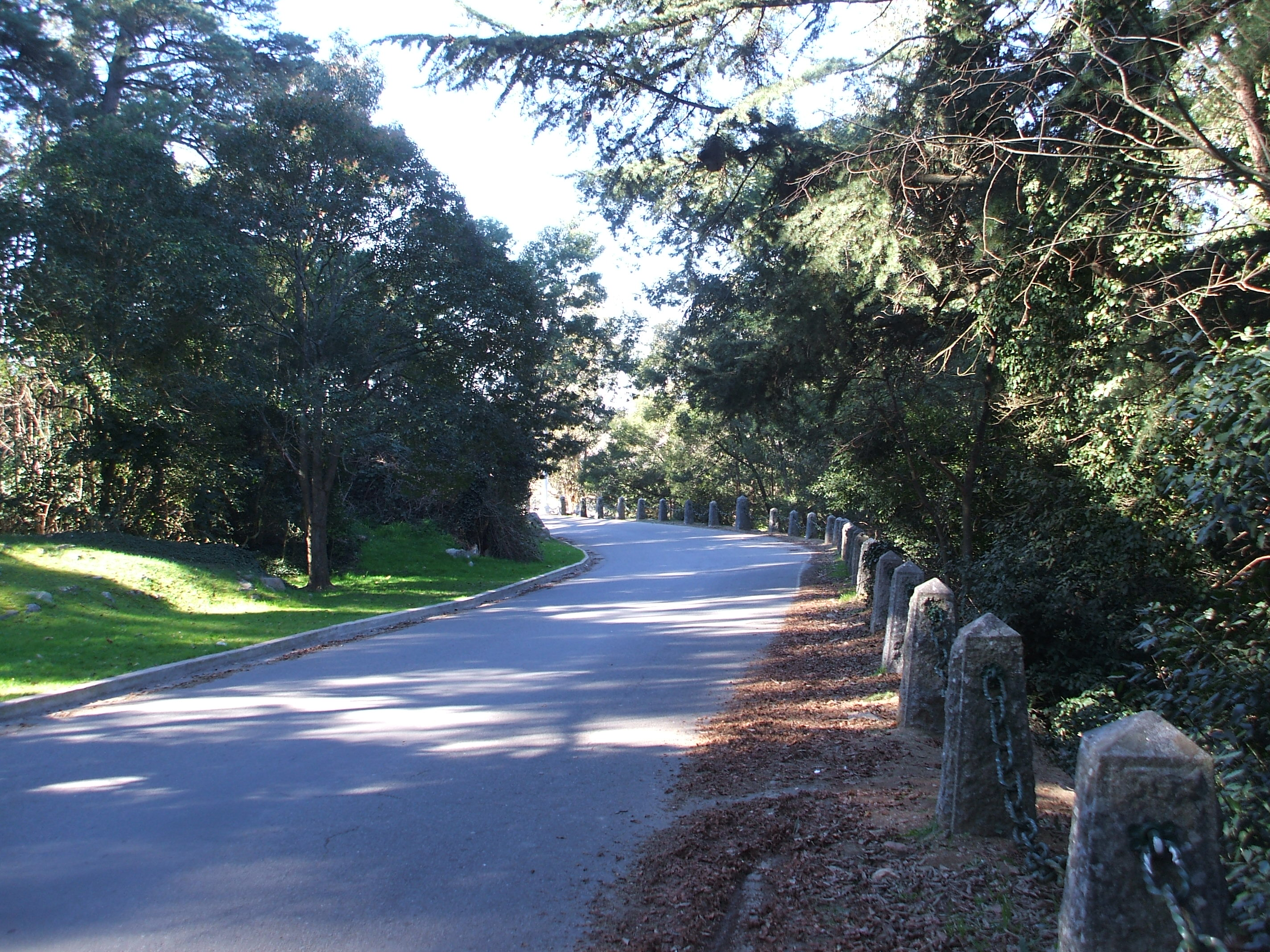
Road to the city's old fort

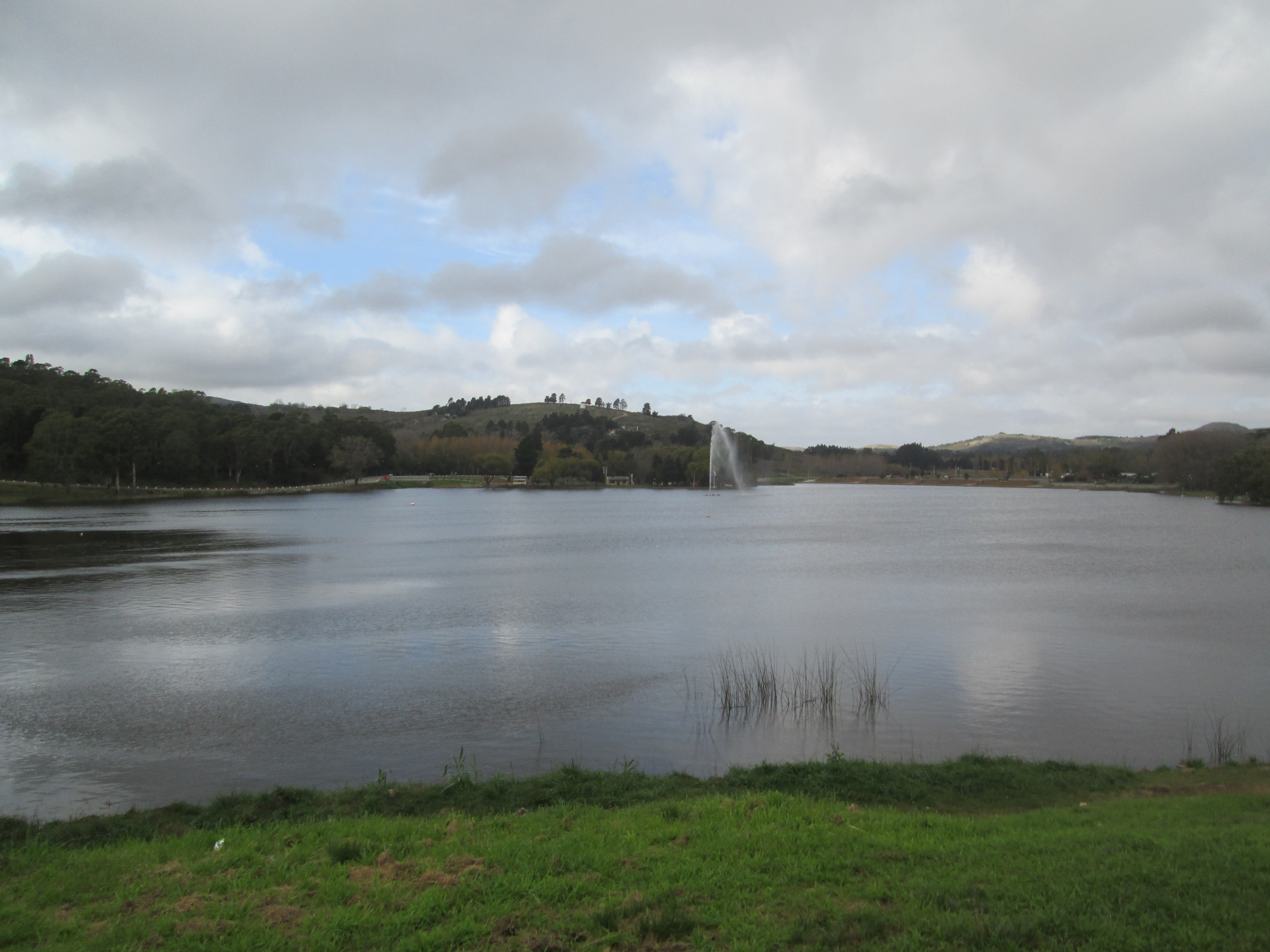
Lago del Fuerte in 2014

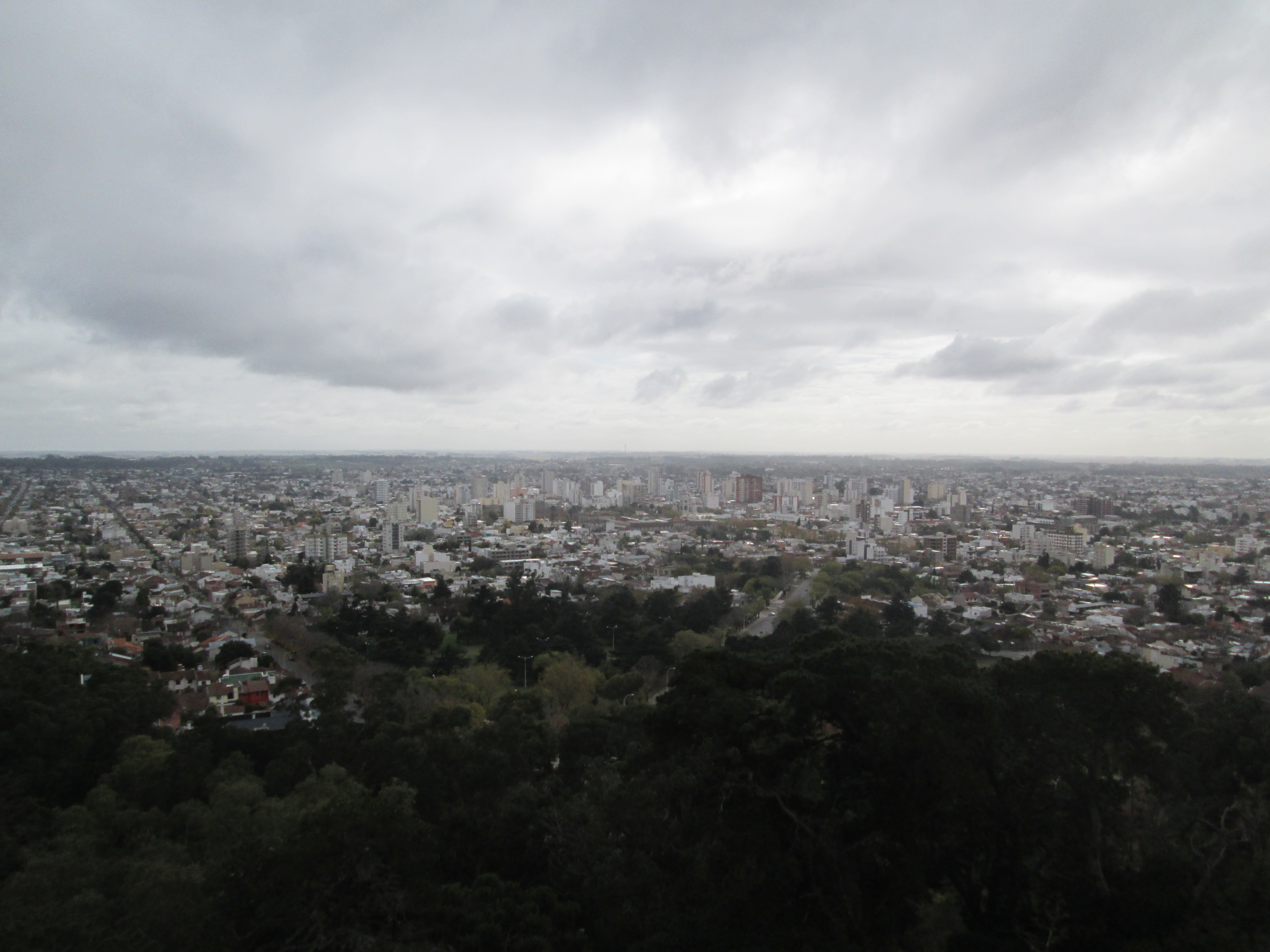
City skyline from Independence Park

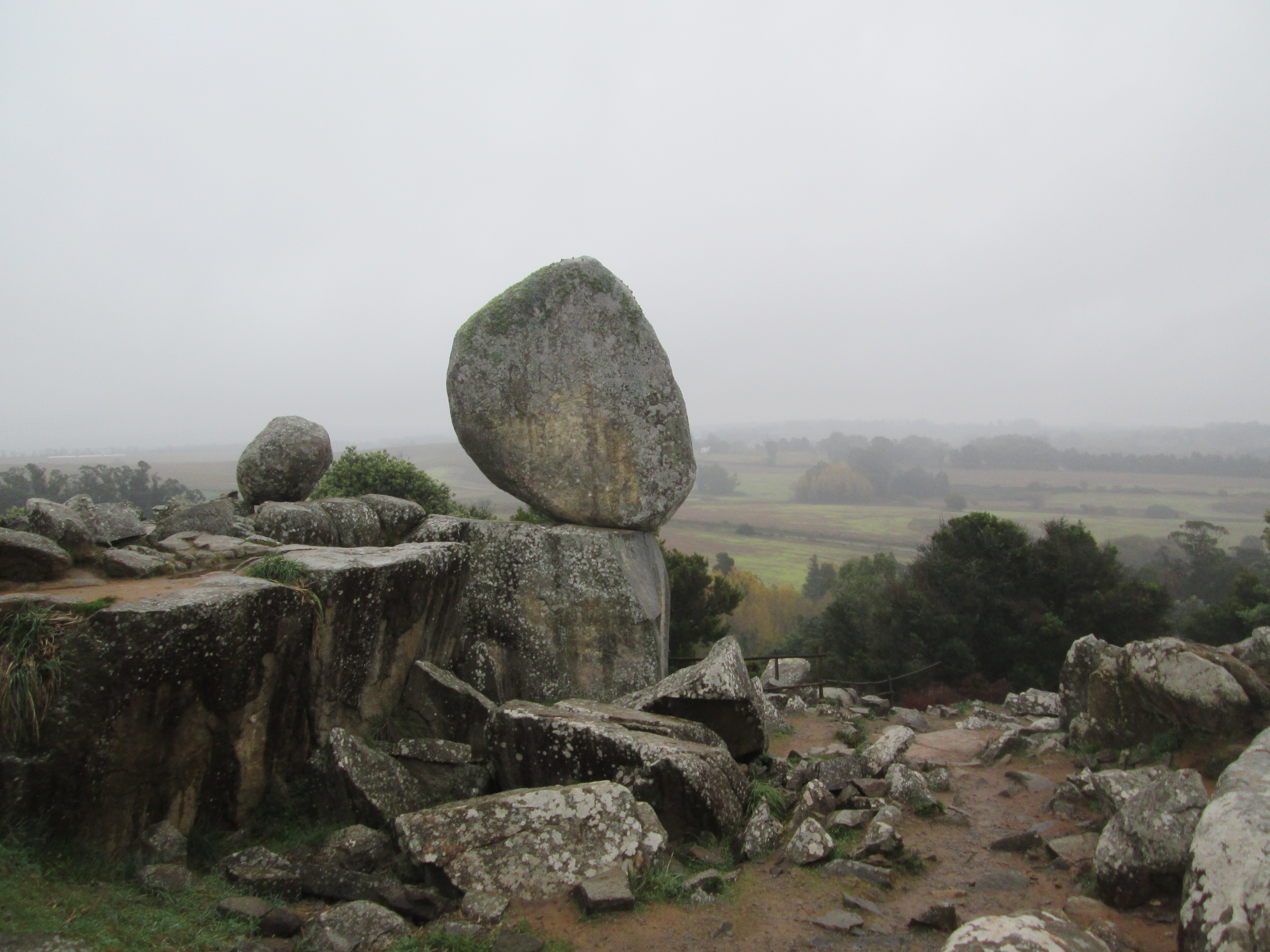
Centinela rock formation outside of the city

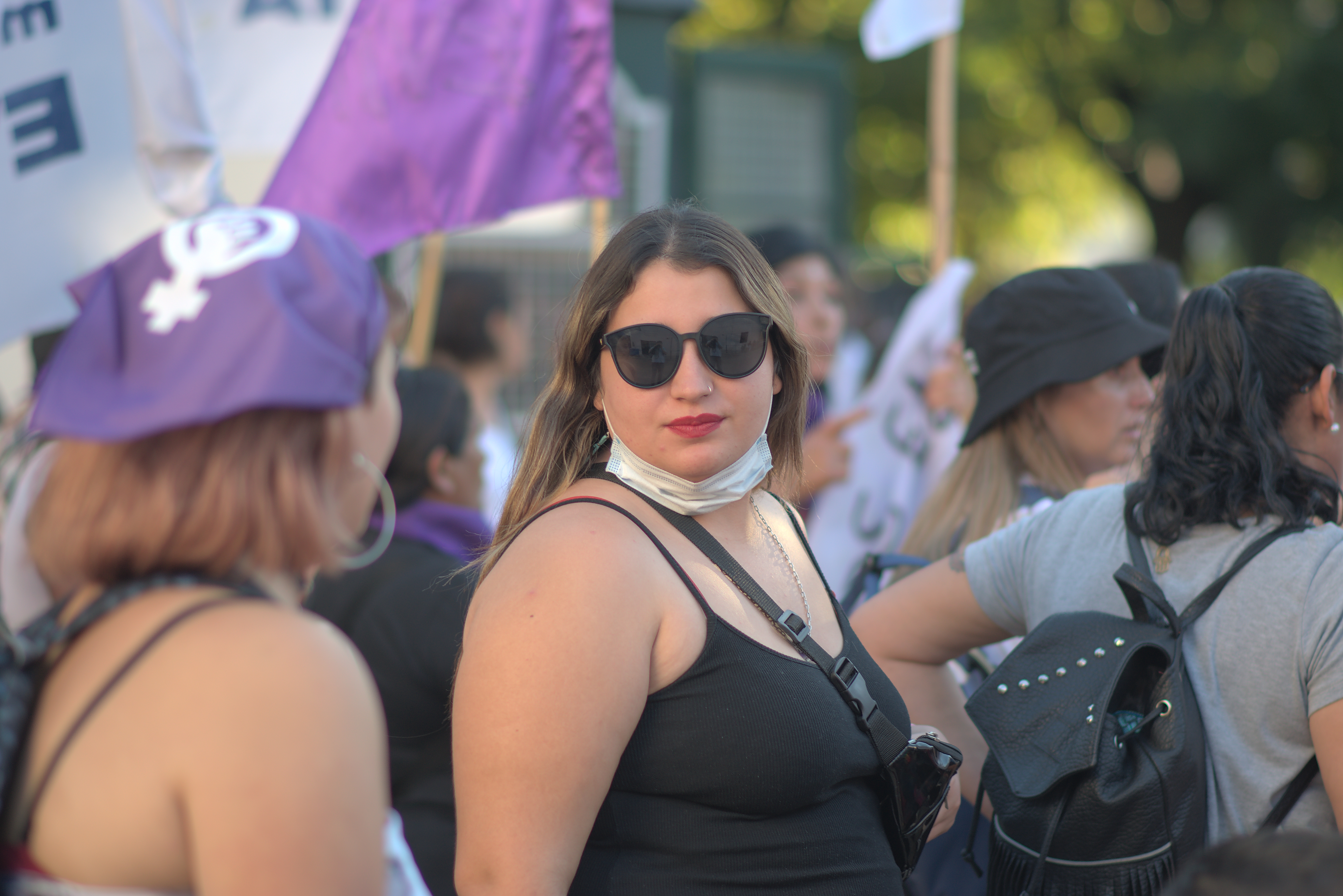
A participant in International Women's Day 2022 in Tandil
