= Alejandro Domenez =

Argentine footballer

Personal information
- Full name: Alejandro Agustín Domenez
- Date of birth: February 25, 1987 (age 39)
- Place of birth: Tandil, Argentina
- Height: 1.75 m (5 ft 9 in)
- Position: Left back

Team information
- Current team: Gimnasia y Esgrima

Senior career*
Years	Team	Apps	(Gls)
2006–2009	Gimnasia La Plata	4	(0)
2007	→ Almagro (loan)	6	(0)
2009–2011	Nueva Chicago		
2011–2012	Villa San Carlos		
2012–2013	Sportivo Belgrano	4	(0)
2013	Gimnasia y Esgrima	17	(0)
2013–2014	San Martín de Tucumán	6	(1)
2014–	Gimnasia y Esgrima	15	(2)
- * Club domestic league appearances and goals as of 11 April 2015

Alejandro Agustín Domenez (born 25 February 1987) is an Argentine football midfielder currently playing for Gimnasia y Esgrima.

Domenez made his league debut in a 3–1 defeat by Arsenal de Sarandí on 5 August 2006. In 2007, he was loaned to Almagro of the Argentine 2nd division. Since his return to Gimnasia in 2008 he has failed to return to first team football.

- (in Spanish) Argentine Primera statistics
