= Quequén =

Coordinates: 38°32′S 58°43′W

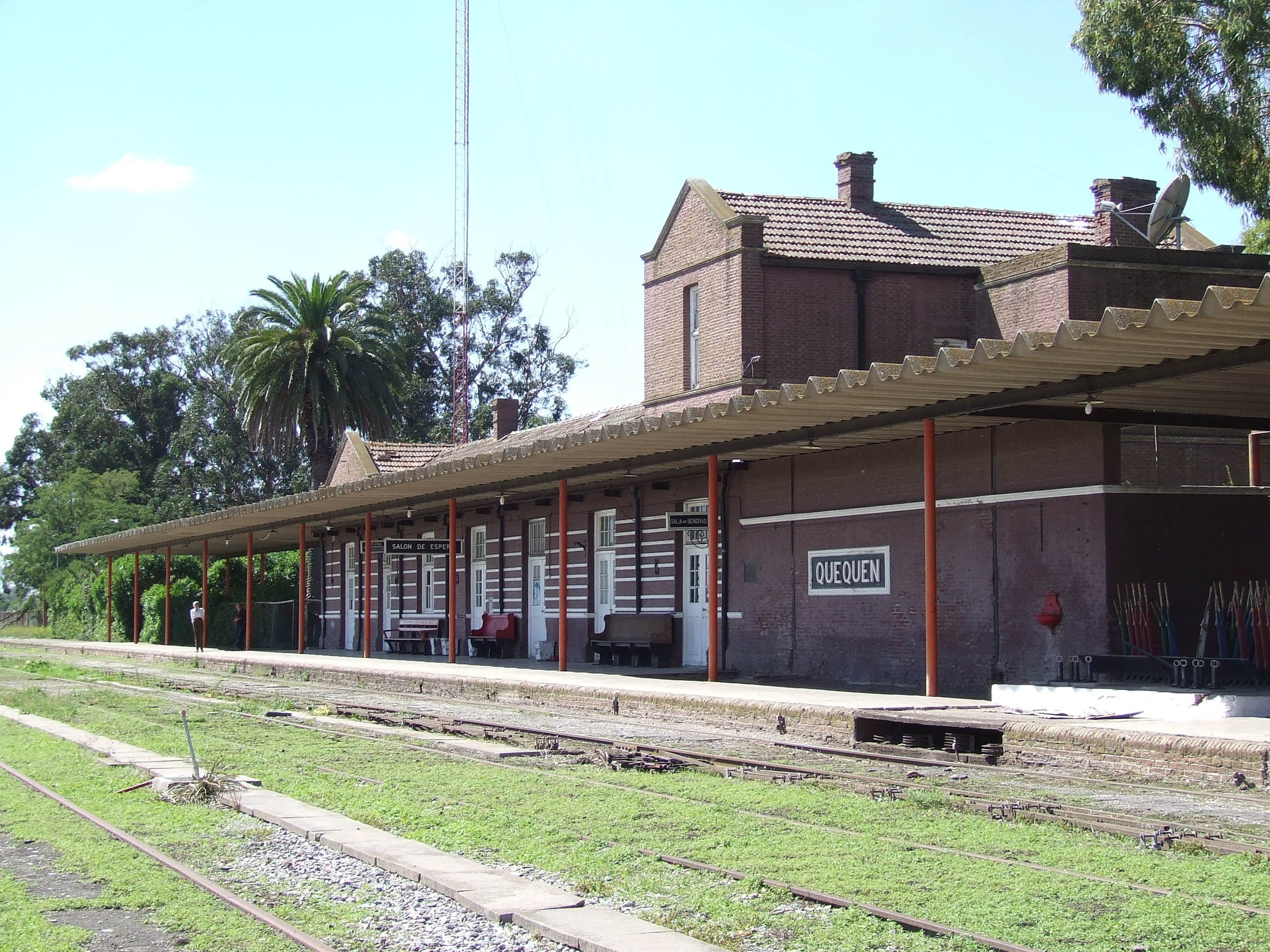
Train station.

Quequén is a port and a resort town in Necochea Partido, Buenos Aires province, Argentina, on the Atlantic Coast by the Quequén Grande River, directly adjacent to Necochea. With a population of 14,524 inhabitants (INDEC, 2001) it is one of the most important grain exporting harbours in Argentina.
Quequén, originated from the Puelche word "kem ken", meaning "high gullies" or "deep ravines", in the language spoken by the native people.

== History ==
The first Europeans to arrive in the area were a few soldiers who accompanied Juan de Garay, the second founder of Buenos Aires, on an expedition south of the río Salado in 1582. Garay describes the lands as fertile and emphasized the rich cattle ranching potential the area presented.

The first explorer and regional cartographer, the Jesuit Cardiel on his famous trip and mission to the Río de los Sauces in 1748, impressed by the deepness of the Quequén Grande River, he notes in his journal: "another very deep river with high banks." In 1748, the Englishman, Thomas Falkner, another Compañía de Jesús missionary, recognized the need to build a port at the mouth of the río Quequén Grande for better communication between the coast and the interior.

Quequén was founded on 3 August 1854. For many years, it was part of Lobería Parish (partido de Lobería) until 1979 when the acting military government elected to annex the city and the nearby seaside town of Costa Bonita into the Necochea Parish (partido de Necochea) since they bordered that parish's administrative seat.

=== Aspirations for Autonomy ===
There were several requests made by the city's inhabitants to be self-determining and administer their own resources. In 1854, in the locale “La Ballenera,” a neighborhood council formally petitioned for the founding of the city of Quequén and that it be made the administrative seat for Loberías Grandes, today known as Lobería Parish (partido de Lobería). The city remained part of this parish until 22 May 1979 when it was formally annexed by the district of Necochea, registered as Decree Law 9327 and endorsed by Ibérico Saint Jean, the then military governor of the province of Buenos Aires.

The Neighborhood Development Union of Quequén, founded in 1933, affirmed in its statutes that this institution must fight for and manage the autonomy of the people. The idea of “autonomy” began to mature and from 1983 with the re-establishment of democracy, movements sprung forth in favor of separating from Necochea Parish. These movements for autonomy petitioned the municipal governments, by way of its Deliberative Councils, to hold a referendum. The ordinances in favor of separation were vetoed by the Justicialist governments that governed Necochea Parish from 1983 to 2003. In 2004, Mayor Dr. Daniel Anselmo Molina of the Radical Civic Union (UCR), followed through on a campaign promise to hold a non-binding referendum.

In 2004, the referendum was carried out using an electronic voting system in which 93.9 percent of Quequen's residents voted in favor of creating a new autonomous district, 5.38 percent voting to remain part of Necochea Parish, and 0.63 percent electing to move to become part of Lobería Parish and form a special council to carry out negotiations with the province. It was from here that the Quequén Pro-Autonomy Commission was created led by the presidency from the Neighborhood Development Union; this commission ceased functions in 2007. In 2009, the Neighborhood Development Union created a Permanent Autonomous Forum that began to negotiate for the creation of a new municipality in the province of Buenos Aires.

Currently, the project to create the municipality of Quequén is in the Provincial Senate of Buenos Aires and holds parliamentary status. In 2011, the so-called "Tent of Hope" was erected near the port of Quequén. There, an important group of residents advocating for autonomy initiated activities linked to the struggle for the creation of the new municipality of Quequén. In 2012, Quequén began protest actions on Route 2, as did Lezama Parish, to achieve autonomy.
