= San Manuel, Buenos Aires =

San Manuel
- Town
- Location within Buenos Aires Province
- Coordinates: 37°48′S 58°50′W
- Country: Argentina
- Province: Buenos Aires
- Partidos: Lobería
- Established: March 25, 1929
- Elevation: 76 m (249 ft)

Population (2001 Census)
  - Total: 1,120
- Time zone: UTC−3 (ART)
- CPA Base: B 7007
- Climate: Dfc

San Manuel is a town located in the Lobería Partido in the province of Buenos Aires, Argentina. The town is managed by the San Manuel Municipal Delegation, which also runs the northern portion of the partido.

== History ==
San Manuel was established on March 25, 1929 with the construction of a railway station in the region. The town received its name from a pulp shop constructed in the region in 1870. The town's early economy was primarily based on agriculture and livestock. There are also several clay quarries located just outside of San Manuel.

== Population ==
According to INDEC, which collects population data for the country, the town had a population of 1,120 people as of the 2001 census.
