= Lobería =

- Location in Argentina
- Coordinates: 38°08′S 58°46′W
- Country: Argentina
- Province: Buenos Aires
- Partido: Lobería
- Founded: January 31, 1891

Population (2001 census [INDEC])
  - Total: 12,199
- CPA Base: B 7635
- Area code: +54 2261

Lobería is a town in Buenos Aires Province, Argentina. It is the administrative centre for the Lobería Partido. The town is located on Provincial Route 227. Lobería is home to several museums and cultural centers.

== History ==
The region was first mentioned in 1582 by Spaniard Juan de Garay, who noted the area as being abundant in sea lions. The region was referred to as Lobería Grande.

The partido where Lobería is located was founded in 1839. For over 50 years, there was a long-standing debate over whether the partido's seat should be located by the sea or in an inland location. The latter was eventually decided on, with Lobería being established as the seat on January 31, 1891.

The anarchist poet Iris Pavón was born in Lobería in 1906.

A college, the University of Lobería, was opened in the town in April 2019, becoming the first such center in Lobería. As of 2024, the facility enrolls over 300 students.

== Population ==
According to INDEC, which collects population data for the country, the town had a population of 12,199 people as of the 2001 census, making it by far the most populous locality in the Lobería Partido.
