= Balcarce, Buenos Aires =

City in Buenos Aires Province, Argentina

San José de Balcarce
- City
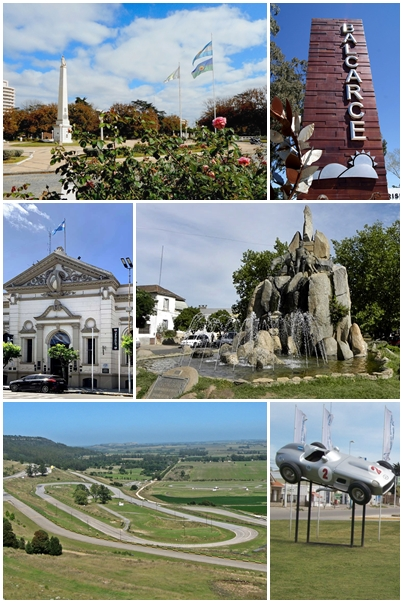

- Location in Argentina
- Coordinates: 37°49′S 58°15′W
- Country: Argentina
- Province: Buenos Aires
- Partido: Balcarce
- Founded: 22 June 1876

Area
  - Total: 4,120 km^{2} (1,590 sq mi)
- Elevation: 112 m (367 ft)

Population (2022 census [INDEC])
  - Total: 51,736
- CPA Base: B 7600
- Area code: +54 2266
- Climate: Cfb
- Website: Official website

San José de Balcarce (shortened to Balcarce) is a city in Buenos Aires Province (Argentina) about 51 km (32 mi) west of Mar del Plata with a population of approx 44,064 (2010 census). It is the head town of the Balcarce Partido (District of Balcarce). The UN/LOCODE is ARBCA.

The city is famous as the birthplace of Formula One legend Juan Manuel Fangio and today houses the Museo Juan Manuel Fangio ("Juan Manuel Fangio" Museum) and the Autódromo Juan Manuel Fangio, a motorsports circuit.

The town hall, cemetery portal and slaughterhouse were all designed by the architect Francisco Salamone, and contain elements of Art Deco style. Built in the late 1930s, these buildings were some of the first examples of modern architecture in rural Argentina.

== Museo del Automovilismo "Juan Manuel Fangio" ==
Located just a few blocks from where Fangio was born, the museum houses a collection of cars, trophies, photographs and other memorabilia.

Map of the Autódromo Juan Manuel Fangio, a race track nearby, named for Fangio.

== Climate ==
Climate data for Balcarce (1991–2020)
| Month | Jan | Feb | Mar | Apr | May | Jun | Jul | Aug | Sep | Oct | Nov | Dec | Year |
|---|---|---|---|---|---|---|---|---|---|---|---|---|---|
| Record high °C (°F) | 40.2 (104.4) | 37.2 (99.0) | 35.4 (95.7) | 32.1 (89.8) | 29.2 (84.6) | 22.7 (72.9) | 23.5 (74.3) | 30.1 (86.2) | 29.7 (85.5) | 31.6 (88.9) | 33.6 (92.5) | 40.7 (105.3) | 40.7 (105.3) |
| Mean daily maximum °C (°F) | 28.3 (82.9) | 26.6 (79.9) | 24.8 (76.6) | 20.7 (69.3) | 16.9 (62.4) | 13.4 (56.1) | 12.5 (54.5) | 14.9 (58.8) | 16.5 (61.7) | 19.5 (67.1) | 23.0 (73.4) | 26.6 (79.9) | 20.3 (68.5) |
| Daily mean °C (°F) | 20.6 (69.1) | 19.5 (67.1) | 17.8 (64.0) | 14.3 (57.7) | 11.2 (52.2) | 8.1 (46.6) | 7.3 (45.1) | 9.0 (48.2) | 10.4 (50.7) | 13.2 (55.8) | 16.2 (61.2) | 19.1 (66.4) | 13.9 (57.0) |
| Mean daily minimum °C (°F) | 14.3 (57.7) | 14.0 (57.2) | 12.6 (54.7) | 9.7 (49.5) | 7.0 (44.6) | 4.4 (39.9) | 3.4 (38.1) | 4.4 (39.9) | 5.3 (41.5) | 7.9 (46.2) | 10.4 (50.7) | 12.7 (54.9) | 8.8 (47.8) |
| Record low °C (°F) | 5.6 (42.1) | 5.3 (41.5) | 2.7 (36.9) | 0.5 (32.9) | −2.4 (27.7) | −3.9 (25.0) | −5.7 (21.7) | −3.9 (25.0) | −3.5 (25.7) | −1.8 (28.8) | 0.8 (33.4) | 2.4 (36.3) | −5.7 (21.7) |
| Average precipitation mm (inches) | 99.5 (3.92) | 84.8 (3.34) | 84.4 (3.32) | 85.3 (3.36) | 53.2 (2.09) | 58.4 (2.30) | 52.1 (2.05) | 59.8 (2.35) | 59.7 (2.35) | 87.3 (3.44) | 97.0 (3.82) | 79.3 (3.12) | 900.7 (35.46) |
| Average precipitation days (≥ 0.1 mm) | 8.3 | 7.2 | 7.9 | 8.8 | 6.4 | 7.3 | 8.1 | 6.4 | 7.3 | 9.9 | 9.2 | 7.9 | 94.7 |
| Average relative humidity (%) | 74.2 | 78.5 | 81.0 | 83.0 | 85.3 | 86.0 | 86.5 | 82.2 | 81.2 | 81.0 | 77.7 | 73.0 | 80.8 |
| Mean monthly sunshine hours | 266.6 | 228.8 | 217.0 | 162.0 | 136.4 | 114.0 | 120.9 | 145.7 | 168.0 | 195.3 | 231.0 | 269.7 | 2,255.4 |
| Mean daily sunshine hours | 8.6 | 8.1 | 7.0 | 5.4 | 4.4 | 3.8 | 3.9 | 4.7 | 5.6 | 6.3 | 7.7 | 8.7 | 6.2 |
| Percentage possible sunshine | 60.5 | 61.7 | 55.4 | 51.2 | 44.0 | 40.5 | 40.5 | 44.3 | 48.0 | 50.6 | 55.0 | 60.3 | 51.0 |
Source 1: Servicio Meteorológico Nacional
Source 2: Instituto Nacional de Tecnología Agropecuaria
