= Lobería Partido =

Lobería Partido de Lobería
- Department
- Coat of arms

- location of Lobería Partido in Buenos Aires Province
- Coordinates: 41°15′S 63°17′W
- Country: Argentina
- Established: January 31, 1891
- Seat: Lobería

Government
  - Mayor: Juan José Fioramonti (UCR)

Area
  - Total: 4,755 km^{2} (1,836 sq mi)

Population
  - Total: 17,008
  - Density: 3.577/km^{2} (9.264/sq mi)
- Demonym: loberense
- Postal Code: B2744
- IFAM: BUE072
- Area Code: 02261
- Website: loberia.gov.ar

Lobería Partido is a partido on the Atlantic coast of Buenos Aires Province in Argentina.

The provincial subdivision has a population of about 17,000 inhabitants in an area of 4,755 km^{2} (1,836 sq mi), and its capital city is the town of Lobería.

== Economy ==
Like its neighbouring partidos on the Atlantic coast, the economy of Lobería is dominated by the summer vacation season (December–February), which sees hundreds of thousands of Porteños make their way to the Atlantic coastline.

During the rest of the year the main economic activities are mainly related to farming and cattle breeding.

== Attractions ==
- Museo de Ciencias Naturales, Lobería (Natural Sciences Museum of Loberia)
- Museo Histórico, La Lobería Grande

== Settlements ==
- Lobería (district capital)
- El Lenguaraz
- El Moro
- Las Nutrias
- Licenciado Matienzo
- Los Pitos
- Pieres
- San Manuel
- Arenas Verdes beach

== Notable People from Lobería ==
- José Arce, President of the United Nations General Assembly in 1948.
