= List of universities in Argentina =

Universities in Argentina (National and Provincial) are public, tuition-free and state funded, while private universities require some form of tuition payment.

== Public universities ==
=== National universities ===
Name	Acronym	Main Location		Website	Creation	R.
Name	Acronym	City	Province	Website	Creation	R.
Alto Uruguay	UNAU	San Vicente	Misiones	unau.edu.ar	6 January 2015	
Arts	UNA	Buenos Aires City		www.una.edu.ar	7 November 2014 (Note: Created on 10 December 1996 as Instituto Universitario Nacional del Arte.)	
Arturo Jauretche	UNAJ	Florencio Varela	Buenos Aires	www.unaj.edu.ar	29 December 2009	
Austral Patagonia	UNPA	Río Gallegos	Santa Cruz	www.unpa.edu.ar	11 January 1995 (Note: Created on 22 December 1990 as Universidad Federal de la Patagonia Austral.)	
Avellaneda	UNdAV	Avellaneda	Buenos Aires	www.undav.edu.ar	3 December 2009	
Buenos Aires	UBA	Buenos Aires City		www.uba.ar	12 August 1821	
Catamarca	UNCa	Catamarca	Catamarca	www.unca.edu.ar	19 September 1972	
Central Buenos Aires	UniCen	Tandil	Buenos Aires	www.unicen.edu.ar	9 October 1974 (Note: Merging of the Instituto Universitario de Tandil created on 3 May 1964, and the Instituto Universitario de Olavarría.)	
Chaco Austral	UNCAus	Sáenz Peña	Chaco	www.uncaus.edu.ar	26 December 2007	
Chilecito	UNdeC	Chilecito	La Rioja	www.undec.edu.ar	18 December 2002	
Comahue	UNComa; UNCo	Neuquén	Neuquén	www.uncoma.edu.ar	21 July 1971 (Note: Created on 3 November 1964 as Universidad del Neuquén.)	
Comechingones	UNLC	Villa de Merlo	San Luis	www.unlc.edu.ar	7 November 2014	
Córdoba	UNC	Córdoba	Córdoba	www.unc.edu.ar	29 May 1854 (Note: Created on 19 June 1613 as Universidad de Córdoba, changed its name in 1800 to Real Universidad de San Carlos y de Nuestra Señora de Monserrat.)	
Cuyo	UNCuyo	Mendoza	Mendoza	www.uncuyo.edu.ar	4 April 1939	
Delta	UNDelta	San Fernando	Buenos Aires	undelta.edu.ar	12 October 2023	
Entre Ríos	UNER	Concepción del Uruguay	Entre Ríos	www.uner.edu.ar	30 May 1973	
Formosa	UNF	Formosa	Formosa	www.unf.edu.ar	21 October 1988	
General San Martín	UNSAM	General San Martín	Buenos Aires	www.unsam.edu.ar	2 July 1992	
General Sarmiento	UNGS	Malvinas Argentinas	Buenos Aires	www.ungs.edu.ar	10 June 1992	
Guillermo Brown	UNaB	Almirante Brown	Buenos Aires	www.unab.edu.ar	27 October 2015	
Hurlingham	UNaHur	Hurlingham	Buenos Aires	unahur.edu.ar	2 December 2014	
José C. Paz	UNPaz	José C. Paz	Buenos Aires	www.unpaz.edu.ar	29 December 2009	
Jujuy	UNJu	Jujuy	Jujuy	www.unju.edu.ar	13 December 1973	
La Matanza	UNLaM	La Matanza	Buenos Aires	www.unlam.edu.ar	23 October 1989	
La Pampa	UNLPam	Santa Rosa	La Pampa	www.unlpam.edu.ar	18 April 1973 (Note: Created on 4 September 1958 as Universidad de La Pampa.)	
La Plata	UNLP	La Plata	Buenos Aires	www.unlp.edu.ar	25 September 1905 (Note: Created on 8 February 1897 as Universidad Provincial de La Plata.)	
La Rioja	UNLaR	La Rioja	La Rioja	www.unlar.edu.ar	28 December 1993 (Note: Created on 2 June 1972 as Universidad Provincial de La Rioja.)	
Lanús	UNLa	Lanús	Buenos Aires	www.unla.edu.ar	29 June 1995	
Litoral	UNL	Santa Fe	Santa Fe	www.unl.edu.ar	17 October 1919 (Note: Created on 16 October 1889 as Universidad de Santa Fe.)	
Lomas de Zamora	UNLZ	Lomas de Zamora	Buenos Aires	www.unlz.edu.ar	24 October 1972	
Luján	UNLu	Luján	Buenos Aires	www.unlu.edu.ar	27 December 1972	
Mar del Plata	UNMdP	Mar del Plata	Buenos Aires	www.mdp.edu.ar	27 October 1975 (Note: Created on 19 October 1961 as Universidad de la Provincia de Buenos Aires. Merged with Universidad Católica Stella Maris in 1975.)	
Misiones	UNaM	Posadas	Misiones	www.unam.edu.ar	25 April 1973	
Moreno	UNM	Moreno	Buenos Aires	www.unm.edu.ar	29 December 2009	
National Defense	UNDef	Buenos Aires City		www.undef.edu.ar	2 December 2014	
National Technological University	UTN	Buenos Aires City		www.utn.edu.ar	2 December 1959 (Note: Created on 31 August 1948 as Universidad Obrera Nacional.)	
Northeast	UNNe	Corrientes	Corrientes	www.unne.edu.ar	14 December 1956	
Northwestern Buenos Aires	UNNoBA	Junín	Buenos Aires	www.unnoba.edu.ar	18 December 2002	
Patagonia San Juan Bosco	UNP	Comodoro Rivadavia	Chubut	www.unp.edu.ar	29 February 1980 (Note: Created on 30 February 1973 as Universidad Nacional de la Patagonia. Merged with Universidad Nacional de la Patagonia in 1980.)	
Pedagogical	UniPe	La Plata	Buenos Aires	unipe.edu.ar	17 November 2015 (Note: Created on 9 August 2006 as Universidad Pedagógica Provincial.)	
Pilar	UNPilar	Pilar	Buenos Aires	unpilar.edu.ar	12 October 2023	
Quilmes	UNQ	Quilmes	Buenos Aires	www.unq.edu.ar	23 October 1989	
Rafaela	UNRaf	Rafaela	Santa Fe	www.unraf.edu.ar	23 December 2014	
Raúl Scalabrini Ortiz	UNSO	San Isidro	Buenos Aires	www.unso.edu.ar	2 December 2015	
Río Cuarto	UNRC	Río Cuarto	Córdoba	www.unrc.edu.ar	7 May 1971	
Río Negro	UNRN	Viedma	Río Negro	www.unrn.edu.ar	19 December 2007	
Río Tercero	UNRT	Río Tercero	Córdoba	unrt.com.ar	12 October 2023	
Rosario	UNR	Rosario	Santa Fe	www.unr.edu.ar	18 December 1968	
Salta	UNSa	Salta	Salta	www.unsa.edu.ar	18 May 1972	
San Antonio de Areco	UNSAdA	San Antonio de Areco	Buenos Aires	www.unsada.edu.ar	2 December 2015	
San Juan	UNSJ	San Juan	San Juan	www.unsj.edu.ar	30 May 1973	
San Luis	UNSL	San Luis	San Luis	www.unsl.edu.ar	30 May 1973	
Santiago del Estero	UNSE	Santiago del Estero	Santiago del Estero	www.unse.edu.ar	16 May 1973	
South	UNS	Bahía Blanca	Buenos Aires	www.uns.edu.ar	19 January 1956	
Tierra del Fuego	UNTdF	Ushuaia	Tierra del Fuego	www.untdf.edu.ar	16 December 2009	
Tres de Febrero	UNTreF	Tres de Febrero	Buenos Aires	www.untref.edu.ar	30 June 1995	
Tucumán	UNT	Tucumán	Tucumán	www.unt.edu.ar	4 April 1921 (Note: Created on 2 July 1912 as Universidad de Tucumán.)	
Villa María	UNVM	Villa María	Córdoba	www.unvm.edu.ar	19 April 1995	
Villa Mercedes	UNViMe	Villa Mercedes	San Luis	www.unvime.edu.ar	3 December 2009	
West	UNO	Merlo	Buenos Aires	www.uno.edu.ar	3 December 2009	

=== Provincial universities ===
Name	Acronym	Main Location		Website	Creation	University Status	R.
Name	Acronym	City	Province	Website	Creation	University Status	R.
Arts	IUPA	General Roca	Río Negro	www.iupa.edu.ar	10 March 1999	15 May 2015	
Buenos Aires City	UniCABA	Buenos Aires City		udelaciudad.edu.ar	28 November 2018	–	
La Punta	ULP	La Punta	San Luis	www.ulp.edu.ar	19 May 2004	–	
Chubut	UDC	Rawson	Chubut	udc.edu.ar	22 December 2008	–	
Trades	UPrO	Villa Mercedes	San Luis	uprosanluis.edu.ar	22 October 2014	–	
Córdoba	UPC	Córdoba	Córdoba	www.upc.edu.ar	20 April 2007	16 September 2015	
Entre Ríos	UAdER	Paraná	Entre Ríos	www.uader.edu.ar	12 June 2000	22 June 2001	
Ezeiza	UPE	Ezeiza	Buenos Aires	upe.edu.ar	22 June 2009	16 September 2015	
Laguna Blanca	UPLaB	Laguna Blanca	Formosa	www.uplab.edu.ar	1 July 2022	30 January 2023	
Southwest	UPSo	Pigüé, Bahía Blanca	Buenos Aires	www.upso.edu.ar	8 July 1992	1 April 2014	

== Private universities ==
Name	Acronym	Main Location		Website	Creation	University Status	R.
Name	Acronym	City	Province	Website	Creation	University Status	R.
21st Century	US21	Córdoba	Córdoba	www.21.edu.ar	24 January 1995		
Aconcagua	UdA	Mendoza	Mendoza	www.uda.edu.ar	17 May 1965 (Note: Created as Instituto Superior de la Empresa. Changed its name in 1966 to Instituto Superior Aconcagua.)	9 May 1968	
Adventist	UAP	Libertador San Martín	Entre Ríos	www.uapar.edu	1898 (Note: Created as Colegio Adventista del Plata.)	7 December 1990	
Argentine Patagonia	UPat	Neuquén	Neuquén	upatagonia.edu.ar	9 November 2022		
Atlantis	UAA	Mar de Ajó	Buenos Aires	atlantida.edu.ar	8 April 1994		
Austral	Austral	Pilar	Buenos Aires	www.austral.edu.ar	20 May 1977 (Note: Created as Asociación Civil de Estudios Superiores.)	4 March 1991	
Belgrano	UB	Buenos Aires City		www.ub.edu.ar	11 September 1964	9 May 1968	
Blas Pascal	UBP	Córdoba	Córdoba	www.ubp.edu.ar	1980 (Note: Created as Instituto Superior Pascal.)	21 December 1990	
CAECE	Caece	Buenos Aires City		www.ucaece.edu.ar	9 May 1968		
Catholic of Córdoba	UCCor	Córdoba	Córdoba	www.uccor.edu.ar	8 June 1956 (Note: Created as Instituto Universitario pro Universidad Católica de Córdoba. Changed its name on 11 April 1959.)	22 August 1959	
Catholic of Cuyo	UCCuyo	Rivadavia	San Juan	www.uccuyo.edu.ar	4 May 1953 (Note: Created as Instituto Preuniversitario San Buenaventura.)	17 September 1963	
Catholic of La Plata	UCaLP	La Plata	Buenos Aires	www.ucalp.edu.ar	7 March 1964 (Note: Created as Universidad Comunitaria y Católica. Changed its name on 11 April 1966.)	9 May 1968	
Catholic of Misiones	UCaMi	Posadas	Misiones	www.ucami.edu.ar	13 September 2012		
Catholic of Salta	UCaSal	Salta	Salta	www.ucasal.edu.ar	19 March 1963	9 May 1968	
Catholic of Santa Fe	UCSF	Santa Fe	Santa Fe	www.ucsf.edu.ar	9 June 1957 (Note: Created as Instituto Libre Pro-Universidad Católica de Santa Fe.)	25 August 1960	
Catholic of Santiago del Estero	UCSE	Santiago del Estero	Santiago del Estero	www.ucse.edu.ar	21 June 1960	8 September 1969	
CEMA	UCEMA	Buenos Aires City		www.ucema.edu.ar	3 July 1978 (Note: Created as Centro de Estudios Macroeconómicos de Argentina.)	25 January 1995	
Champagnat	UCh	Godoy Cruz	Mendoza	www.uch.edu.ar	1967 (Note: Created as Instituto Superior Champagnat de los Hermanos Maristas. Changed its name to Facultad de Ciencias Empresariales Marcelino Champagnat in 1971)	4 September 1991	
Cinema	UCine	Buenos Aires City		www.ucine.edu.ar	1991	30 September 1993	
Concepción del Uruguay	UCU	Concepción del Uruguay	Entre Ríos	www.ucu.edu.ar	15 June 1971		
Congreso	UC	Mendoza	Mendoza	www.ucongreso.edu.ar	6 January 1995		
Cuenca del Plata	UCP	Corrientes	Corrientes	www.ucp.edu.ar	23 November 1993		
East	UdE	La Plata	Buenos Aires	ude.edu.ar	6 October 2008		
Enterprise	UADE	Buenos Aires City		www.uade.edu.ar	1957 (Note: Created as Instituto Superior de Estudios de la Empresa. Changed its name on 16 June 1962.)	9 May 1968	
Enterprise and Social Sciences	UCES	Buenos Aires City		www.uces.edu.ar	4 October 1991		
Evangelical	UE	Buenos Aires City		uevangelica.edu.ar	13 November 2023		
FASTA	UFASTA	Mar del Plata	Buenos Aires	www.ufasta.edu.ar	16 August 1991		
Favaloro	Favaloro	Buenos Aires City		www.favaloro.edu.ar	26 June 1992 (Note: Created as Instituto Universitario de Ciencias Biomédicas.)	30 August 1998	
Flores	UFlo	Buenos Aires City		www.uflo.edu.ar	3 January 1995		
Gastón Dachary	UGD	Posadas	Misiones	ugd.edu.ar	12 February 1998 (Note: Created as Instituto Universitario Gastón Dachary.)	26 February 2009	
Greater Rosario	UGR	Rosario	Santa Fe	ugr.edu.ar	5 May 2006 (Note: Created as Instituto Universitario del Gran Rosario.)	18 September 2018	
Interamerican Open	UAI	Buenos Aires City		www.uai.edu.ar	7 August 1995		
ISALUD	ISALUD	Buenos Aires City		www.isalud.edu.ar	14 December 1998 (Note: Created as Instituto Universitario de la Fundación ISALUD.)	10 December 2007	
John F. Kennedy	UK	Buenos Aires City		www.kennedy.edu.ar	4 April 1964	9 May 1968	
Juan Agustín Maza	UMaza	Guaymallén	Mendoza	www.umaza.edu.ar	4 May 1960	28 March 1963	
Latin American Educational Center	UCEL	Rosario	Santa Fe	www.ucel.edu.ar	3 December 1992		
Maimónides	UM	Buenos Aires City		www.maimonides.edu	21 June 1990		
Mendoza	UM	Mendoza	Mendoza	www.um.edu.ar	22 December 1959	7 January 1963	
Merchant Navy	UdeMM	Buenos Aires City		www.udemm.edu.ar	1965 (Note: Created as Fundación Manuel Trigo.)	17 January 1975	
Metropolitan for Education and Work	UMET	Buenos Aires City		umet.edu.ar	13 September 2012		
Morón	UM	Morón	Buenos Aires	www.unimoron.edu.ar	18 May 1960	9 May 1968	
Notarial	UNA	La Plata	Buenos Aires	universidadnotarial.edu.ar	29 September 1964	9 May 1968	
Palermo	UP	Buenos Aires City		www.palermo.edu	12 November 1986	21 December 1990	
Pontifical Catholic	UCA	Buenos Aires City		www.uca.edu.ar	7 March 1958	2 November 1959	
Saint Paul-Tucumán	USPT	Tucumán	Tucumán	uspt.edu.ar	6 July 2007		
Saint Thomas Aquinas	UNSTA	Tucumán	Tucumán	www.unsta.edu.ar	29 October 1959 (Note: Created as Instituto Universitario Santo Tomás de Aquino.)	6 August 1965	
Salesian	UniSal	Bahía Blanca	Buenos Aires	www.unisal.org.ar	1 April 2014		
San Andrés	UdeSA	Victoria	Buenos Aires	www.udesa.edu.ar	1 September 1988	23 August 1990	
San Isidro	USI	San Isidro	Buenos Aires	www.usi.edu.ar	13 September 2012		
Savior	USal	Buenos Aires City		www.usal.edu.ar	8 June 1944 (Note: Created as Instituto Superior de Filosofía. Changed its name to Institutos Universitarios del Salvador on 15 May 1958.)	8 December 1959	
Social Museum	UMSA	Buenos Aires City		www.umsa.edu.ar	5 November 1956	11 July 1961	
South American Integration	UNISUD	Posadas	Misiones	unisud.edu.ar	5 July 2022		
Southern Buenos Aires	USBA	Buenos Aires City		usba.edu.ar	28 September 2023		
Torcuato di Tella	UTdT	Buenos Aires City		www.utdt.edu	24 September 1991		
Instituto Tecnológico de Buenos Aires	ITBA	Buenos Aires City		www.itba.edu.ar	20 October 1959		

== Gallery ==
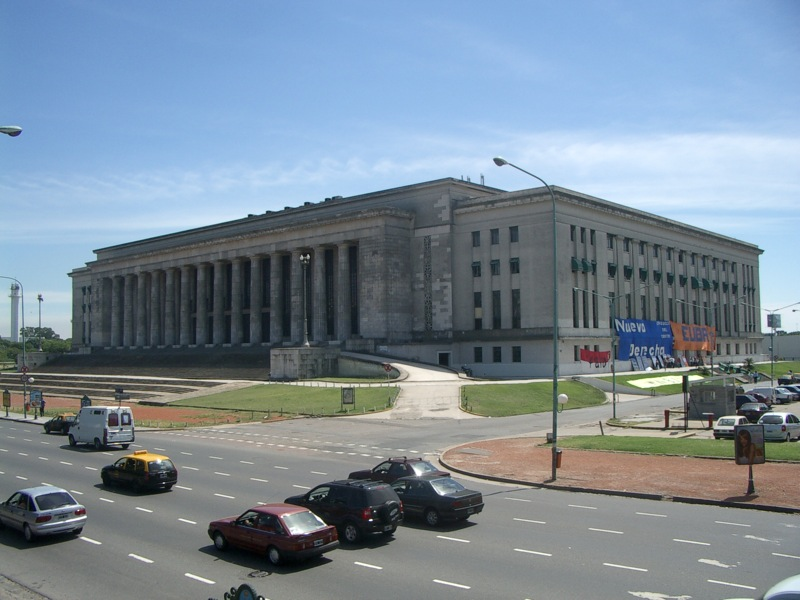
University of Buenos Aires, School of Law

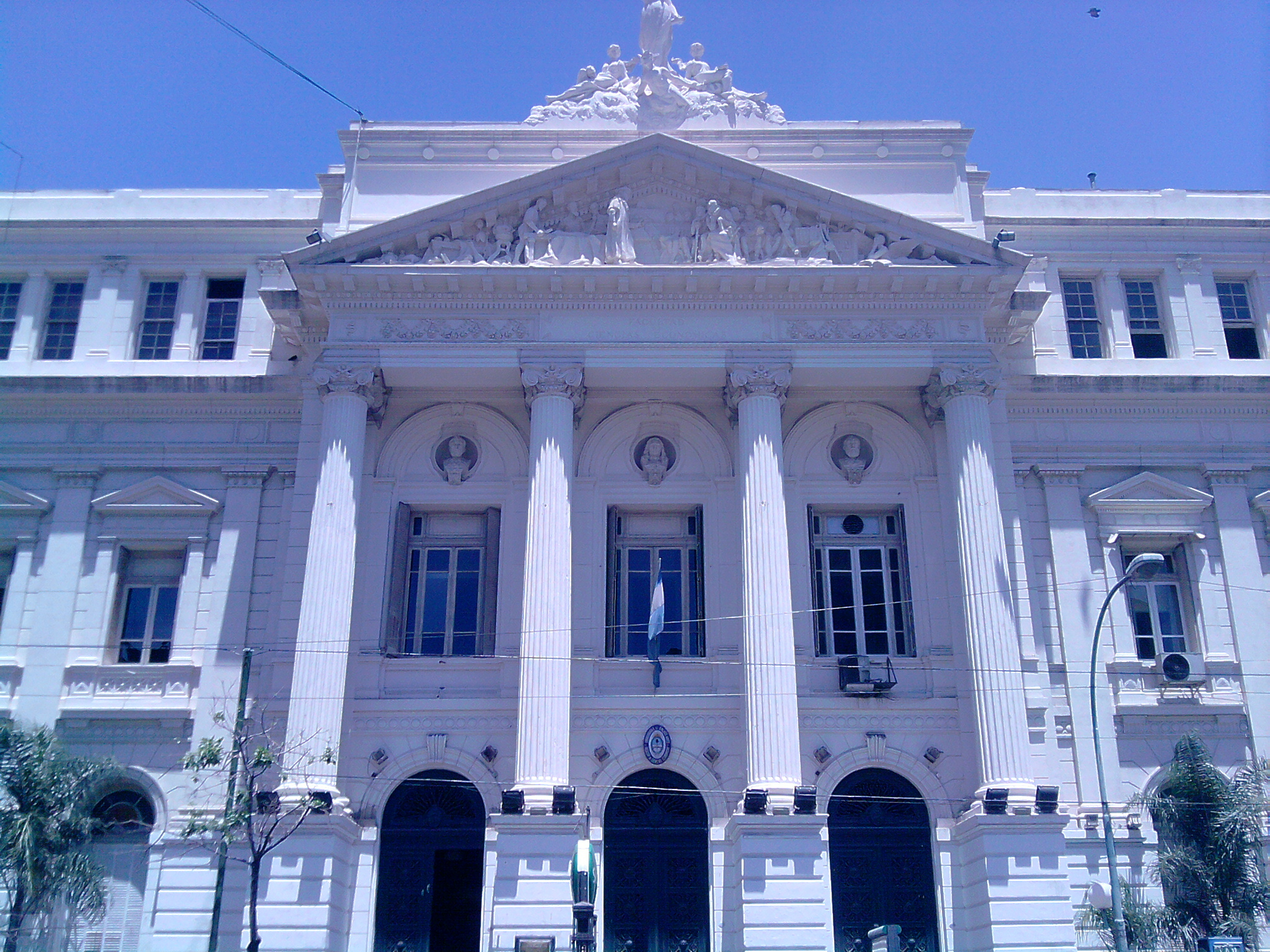
University of Buenos Aires, School of Economics

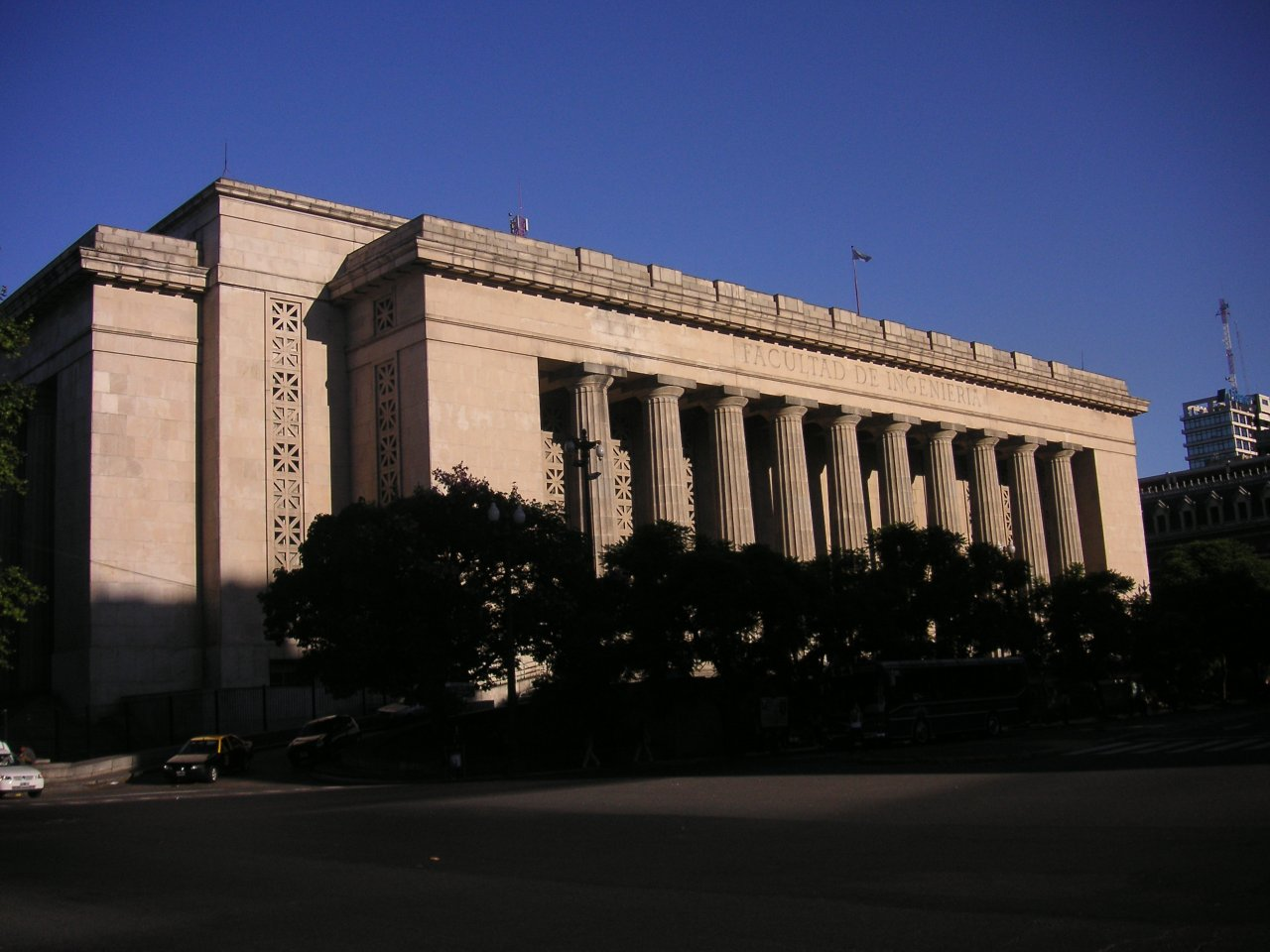
University of Buenos Aires, School of Engineering, Paseo Colón Branch

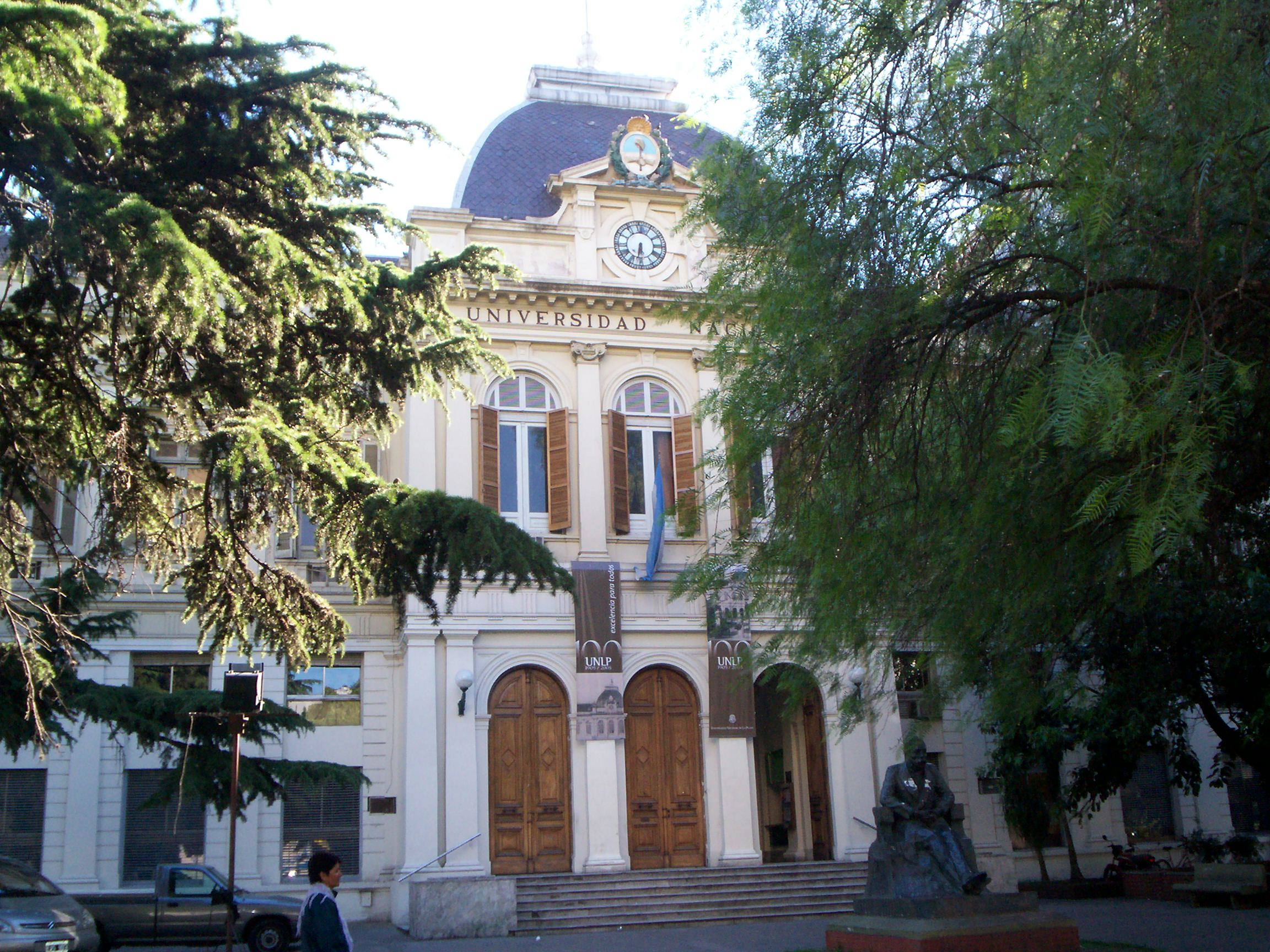
National University of La Plata, Rectorate

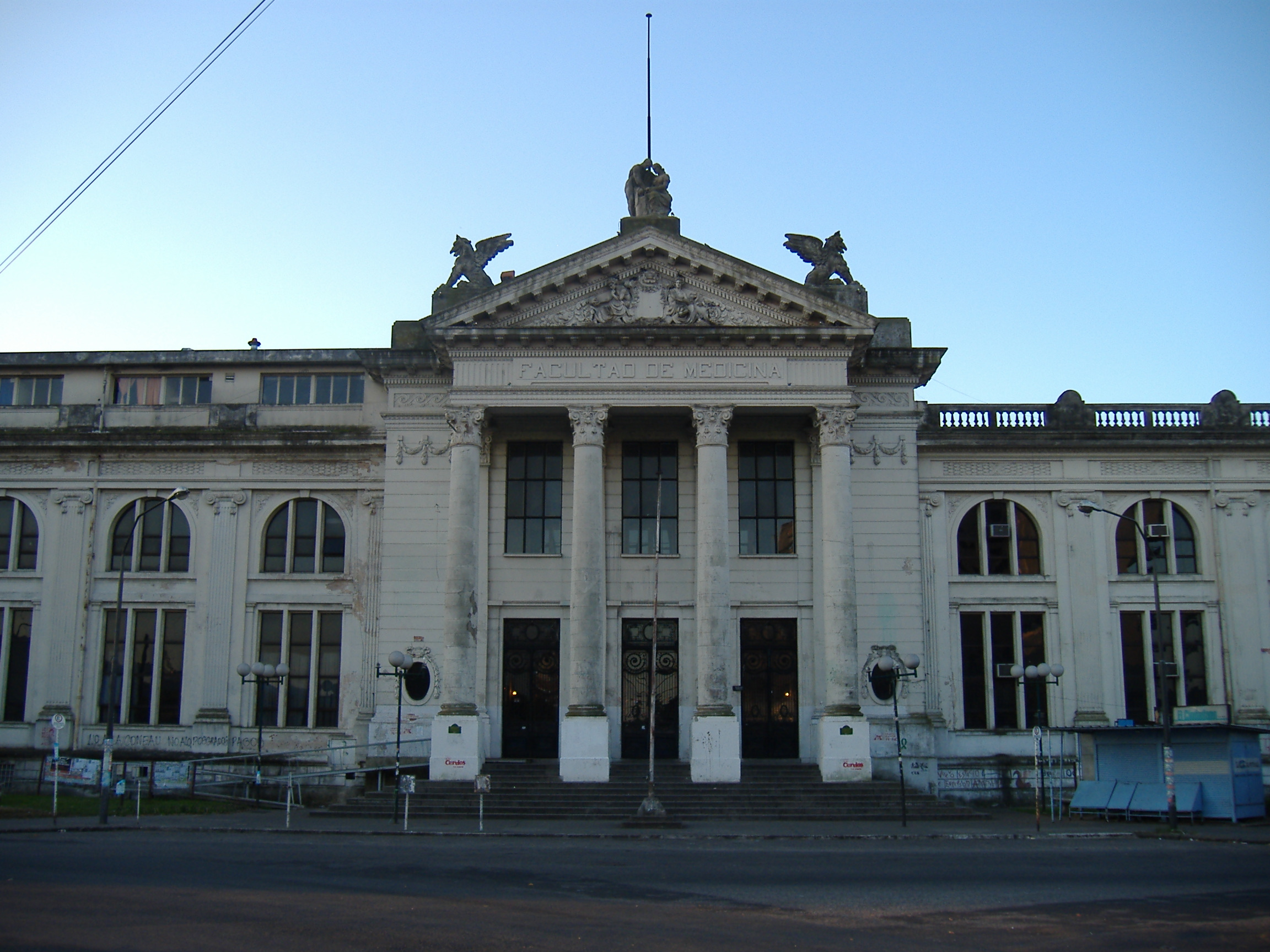
National University of Rosario, School of Medicine

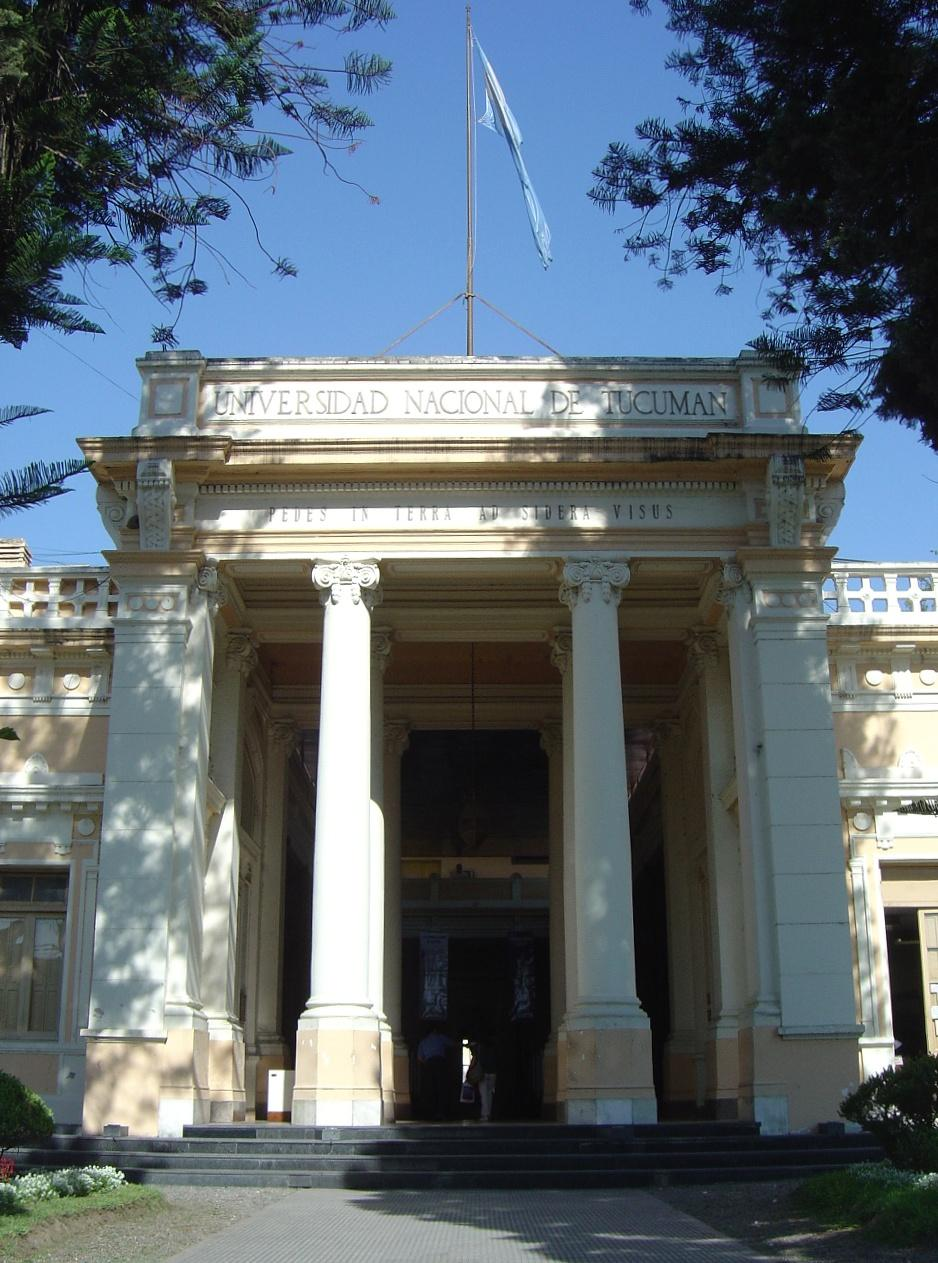
National University of Tucumán, Rectorate

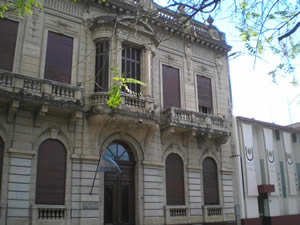
National University of the Northeast, Rectorate

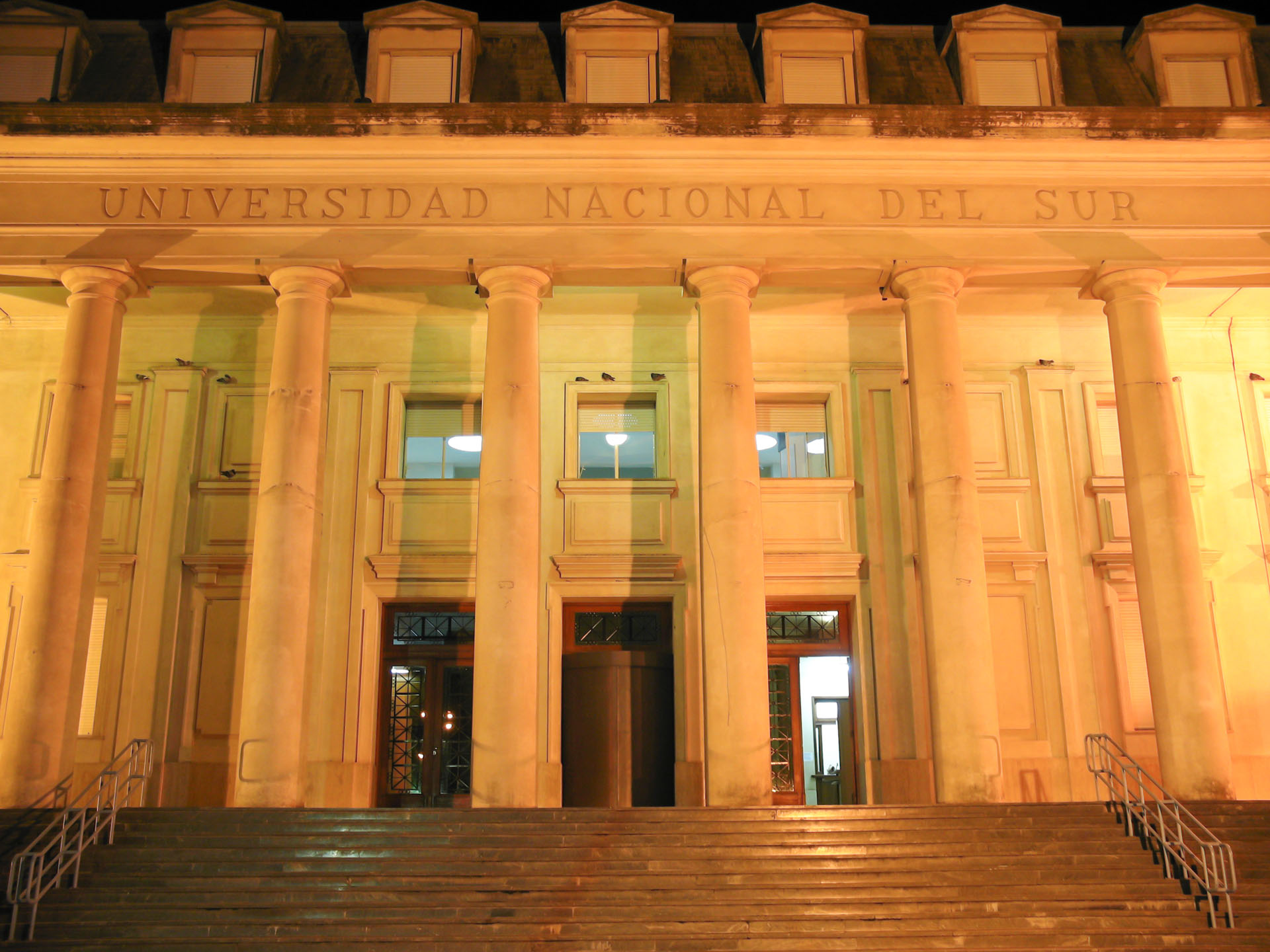
National University of the South, main building

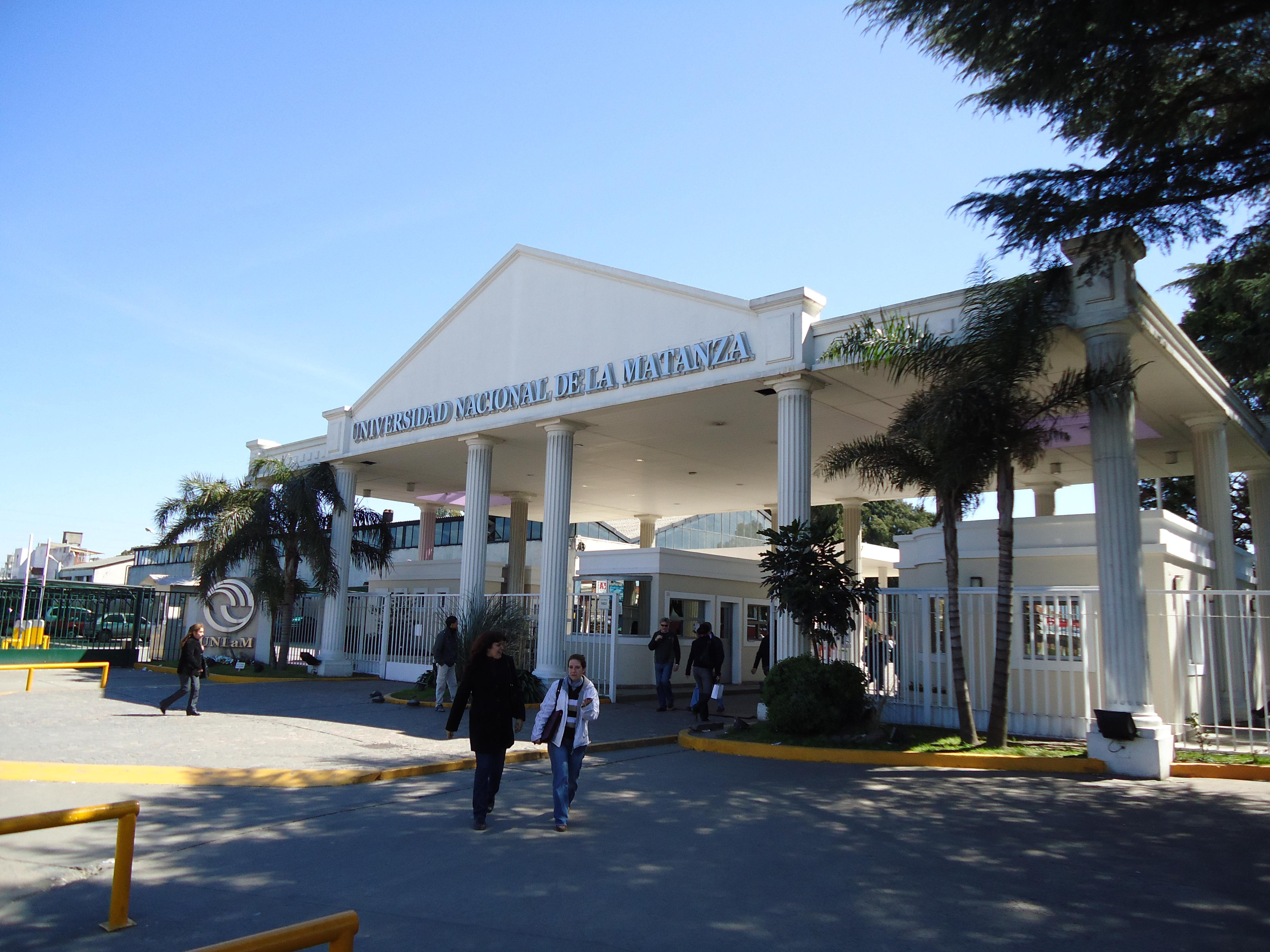
National University of La Matanza, entrance to the main campus

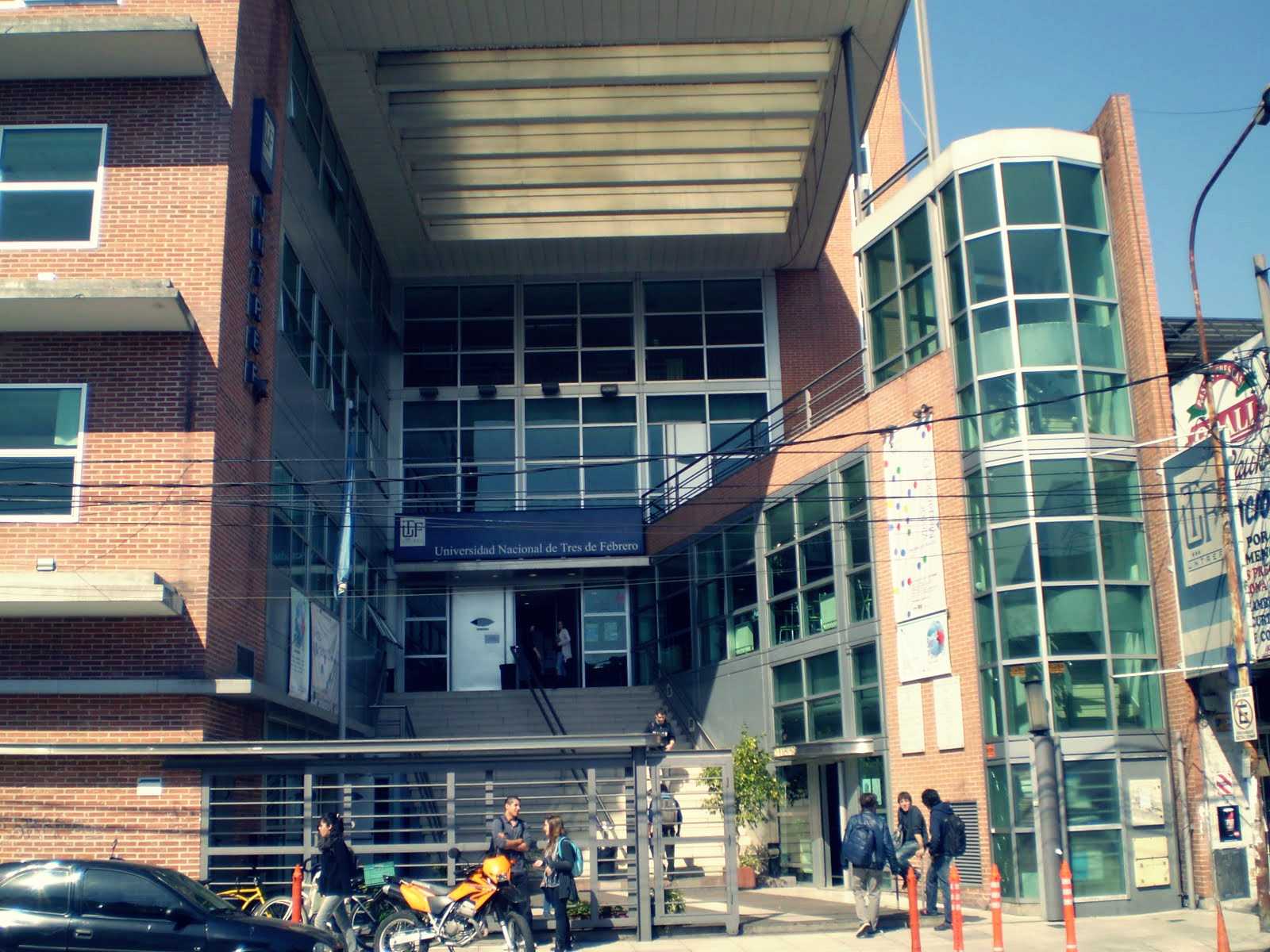
National University of Tres de Febrero, principal school

== See also ==
- Argentine University Federation
- Science and technology in Argentina
- University Revolution
