= UNF =

UNF may refer to:

== Technology ==
- Unified National Fine screw thread , a Unified Thread Standard
- Unnormalized form, a database data model

== Organizations ==
- UniFirst, a US supplier of uniforms
- United National Front (Afghanistan)
- United National Front (Sri Lanka)
- United Nations Foundation, a fund-raising organization
- University of North Florida, Jacksonville, US
- Ungdommens Naturvidenskabelige Forening, the Danish Youth Association of Science
- Ungdomens Nykterhetsförbund, a Swedish youth temperance organisation
- Union Nacional Fascista or National Fascist Union, Argentina, 1936-1939
- Universidad Nacional de Formosa or National University of Formosa, Argentina
