= Rosario Technological Center =

Polo Tecnológico Rosario (PTR) or Rosario Technological Center was founded in 2000, located in Rosario, Argentina. It is composed of provincial and municipal levels, the two universities in the province of Santa Fe and more than 70 private companies. PTR forms part of Argentina's vast pool of science and technology centers.

Currently, after ten years of existence it employs 3,500 people working on areas such as biotechnology, software development and telecommunications. It is expected that Rosario Technological Center will grow 100% by 2015 becoming one of the most important technology production centers in Latin America.
