= Estela Blaisten-Barojas =

Chemical physicist

Estela Olga Blaisten-Barojas is a chemical physicist whose research involves the modeling and computational simulation of elemental and molecular clusters. Educated in Argentina and France, she has worked in Mexico and the US, where she is a professor of computational physics and chemistry at George Mason University.

== Education and career ==
Blaisten-Barojas studied physics at the National University of Tucumán in Argentina, graduating in 1964. She then went to France for graduate study in theoretical molecular physics at Pierre and Marie Curie University, receiving a doctorat de troisième cycle (equivalent to a master's degree) in 1970 and completing her Ph.D. in 1974.

Next, she joined the National Autonomous University of Mexico as an assistant professor of physics in 1975. She was promoted there to associate professor in 1978 and full professor in 1981. In 1992 she moved to her present position as professor in the Department of Computational and Data Sciences and Department of Chemistry and Biochemistry at George Mason University in the US. Since 2006 she has directed the Center for Simulation and Modeling at George Mason. From 2009 to 2010 she went on leave to work as a program director in chemistry at the National Science Foundation.

== Recognition ==
Blaisten-Barojas has been a member of the Mexican Academy of Sciences (Physics Section) since 1980. She was elected as a Fellow of the American Physical Society (APS) in 2006, after a nomination from the APS Division of Computational Physics, "for pioneering work in the computational simulation of atomic and molecular clusters including significant advances in the understanding of the structure and other important properties of nanoscale systems".
