= Oreste Edmundo Pereyra =

Argentine writer (1933–2019)

Oreste Pereyra
- Born: Oreste Edmundo Pereyra; October 22, 1933; La Banda, Santiago del Estero Province, Argentina
- Died: October 2, 2019 (aged 85); La Banda, Santiago del Estero Province, Argentina
- Occupation: Novelist, short story writer, teacher

Oreste Edmundo Pereyra (22 October 1933 – 2 October 2019) was an Argentine novelist, short-story writer, essayist, poet and teacher. He wrote many fictional books as well as educational manuals of great importance in his country.

== Career ==
Oreste Pereyra was born in La Banda, Santiago del Estero Province, Argentina, on October 22, 1933. He graduated as Normal Teacher at the José B. Gorostiaga Normal School and then as Philosophy and Pedagogy teacher, working in schools in his province until ascending as Vice-Rector of the School No. 677 José de San Martín. Likewise, he was part of the Disciplinary Court of the General Council of Education as a member and then president, he created the Teacher Improvement School, he was sub-Secretary of Municipal Education and Culture of La Banda, and he served as a professor of secondary and tertiary level, and ad-honorem at the "Mariano Moreno" School of Journalism.

Also dedicating his life to literature, his book "Manual Suplementario para Cuarto Grado de Santiago del Estero" was published by Estrada Editorial in 1967. Since then, he has also published numerous narrative books, obtaining prizes and distinctions in different literary contests.

Due to his career and contribution to culture, he was declared "Illustrious Citizen of the City of La Banda" and "Ciudadano Sanmartiniano". Finally, in 2018, he was distinguished as "Dr. Honoris Causa" by the National University of Santiago del Estero (UNSE).

On October 2, 2019, at the age of 85, he died in his hometown due to complications in his health, with several tributes dedicated in his memory.

== Bibliography ==
Oreste Pereyra's bibliography covers both educational materials, such as plays, stories, poems, stories and novels.

- Manual Suplementario para Cuarto Grado de Santiago del Estero
- Nochebuena
- Ha nacido el Niño
- La Ciudad Perdida
- El Diablo se marchó
- La breve historia de José Eusebio Bustos
- Santiaguito
- Santiaguito y sus amigos
- Manual de Santiago del Estero
- Al paso de los años: Centurias en la Madre de Ciudades
