= UNPA =

UNPA may refer to:

- United National Progressive Alliance, a political grouping in India
- United Nations Parliamentary Assembly, a proposed elected parliament for the UN
- United Nations Postal Administration, the postal system of the UN
- United Nations Protected Area (UNFICYP), Cyprus; see UNFICYP
- United Nations Protected Area (UNPROFOR), in the former Yugoslav Republic of Croatia
- Unione Nazionale Protezione Antiaerea, a civil defense organisation of Fascist Italy
- Universidad del Papaloapan, Tuxtepec, Oaxaca state, Mexico
- National University of Austral Patagonia (Universidad Nacional de la Patagonia Austral), Santa Cruz Province, Argentina
- Unpa County, North Korea
- unpa, the Toki Pona word for sex
