= National University of Luján =

National university in Argentina

Coordinates: 34°34′41″S 59°05′14″W

- Universidad Nacional Luján
- Type: Public
- Established: 1973
- Academic staff: 1,843
- Students: 16,181
- Location: Luján, Buenos Aires, Argentina
- Website: http://www.unlu.edu.ar/

The National University of Luján (Spanish: Universidad Nacional de Luján) is an Argentine national university, situated in Luján, Buenos Aires Province.

== See also ==
- The Latin American Docta
- List of Argentine universities
- Science and Education in Argentina
- Argentine Higher Education Official Site
