= National University of the West =

Coordinates: 34°39′53″S 58°41′58″W

- Universidad Nacional del Oeste
- Type: Public
- Established: 2009
- Rector: Dr. Marcelo Ducrós
- Location: San Antonio de Padua, Buenos Aires, Argentina
- Website: http://uno.edu.ar/

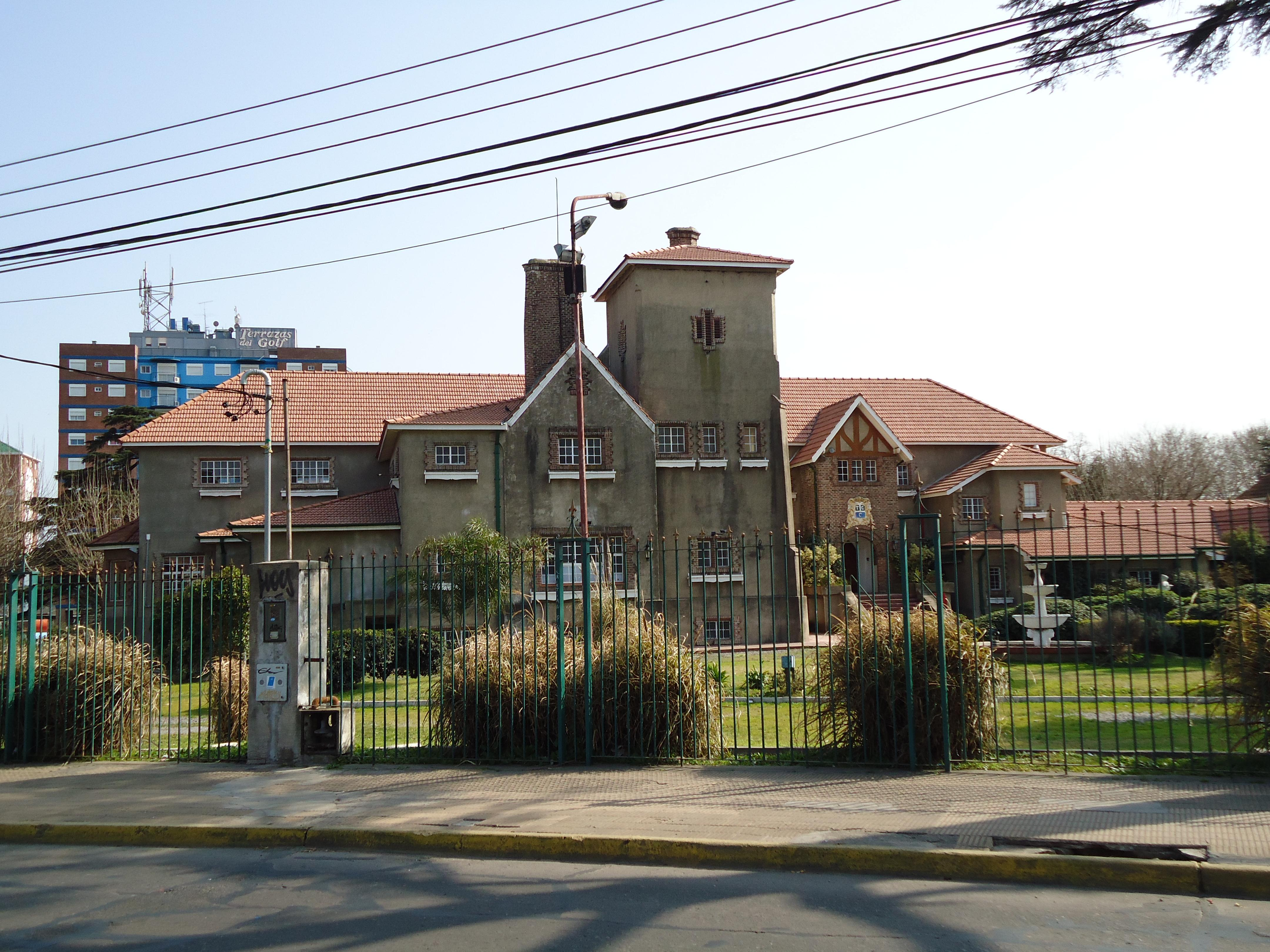
Administrative offices

The National University of the West (Spanish: Universidad Nacional del Oeste, UNO) is an Argentine national university, situated in San Antonio de Padua, Merlo Partido, Buenos Aires Province.

It was established on November 11, 2009, by National Law 26,544. The campus was formally inaugurated on September 16, 2011 - the 35th anniversary of the "night of the pencils" assault against a group of left-wing La Plata students at the height of the Dirty War. The school offers degrees in eight disciplines, including business administration, public administration, physical education, nursing and computer science.

== See also ==
- Science and Education in Argentina
- Argentine Higher Education Official Site
- Argentine Universities
- Science and technology in Argentina
