= National University of Formosa =

Coordinates: 26.1922°S 58.2003°W

- Universidad Nacional de Formosa
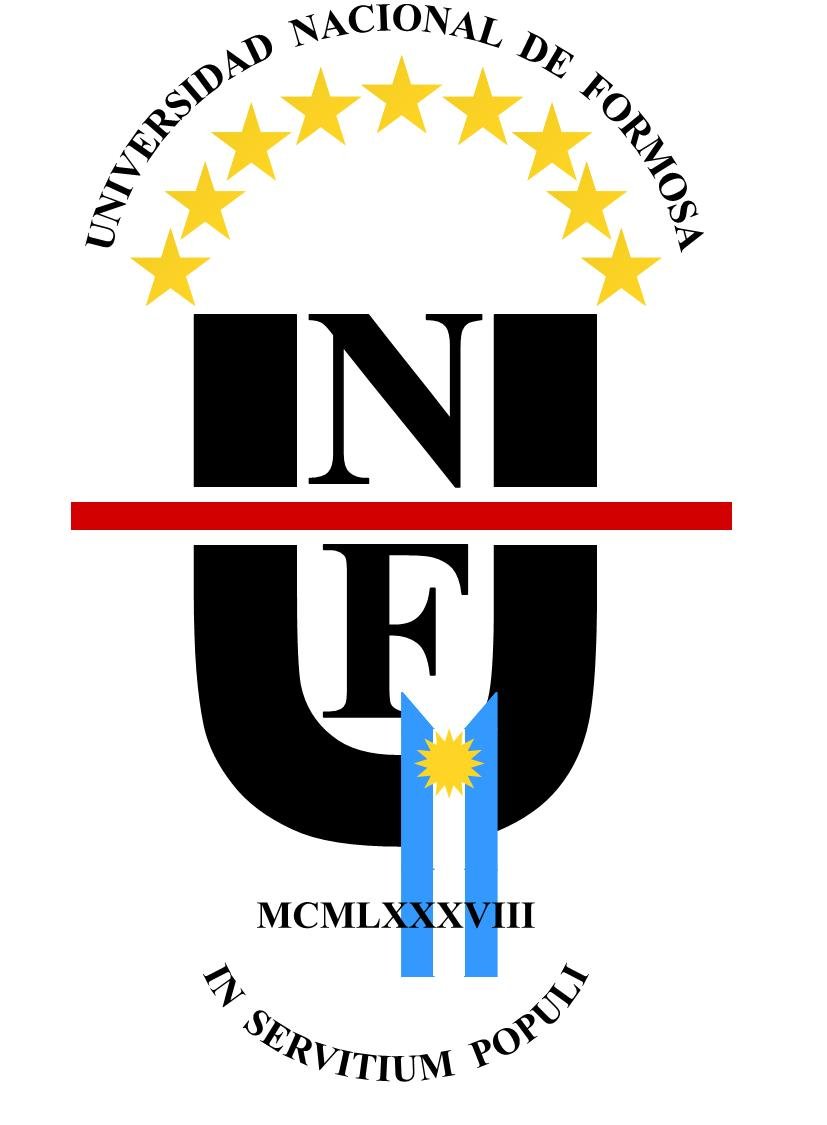
- Type: Public
- Established: 1988
- Academic staff: 995
- Students: 11,996
- Location: Formosa, Formosa, Argentina
- Website: www.unf.edu.ar

The National University of Formosa (Spanish: Universidad Nacional de Formosa, UNF) is an Argentine national university, situated in the city of Formosa, capital of Formosa Province. Its precursor, the University Institute of Formosa, was established in 1971 as a campus of the National University of the Northeast.

== See also ==
- Argentine Universities
- Science and technology in Argentina
- Science and Education in Argentina
- Argentine Higher Education Official Site
