= National University of Hurlingham =

Public university in Argentina

Logo

The National University of Hurlingham (Spanish: Universidad Nacional de Hurlingham) is a public university in Hurlingham, Buenos Aires Province, Argentina, with over 35.000 students.

== Creation ==
The university was created through Law 27.016 in 2014. In 2015 the National Commission for University Evaluation and Accreditation (CONEAU) approved the start of the university's functions under rector Jaime Perczyk, who was previously Secretary of the Secretariat of Education.

== Courses and academic structure ==
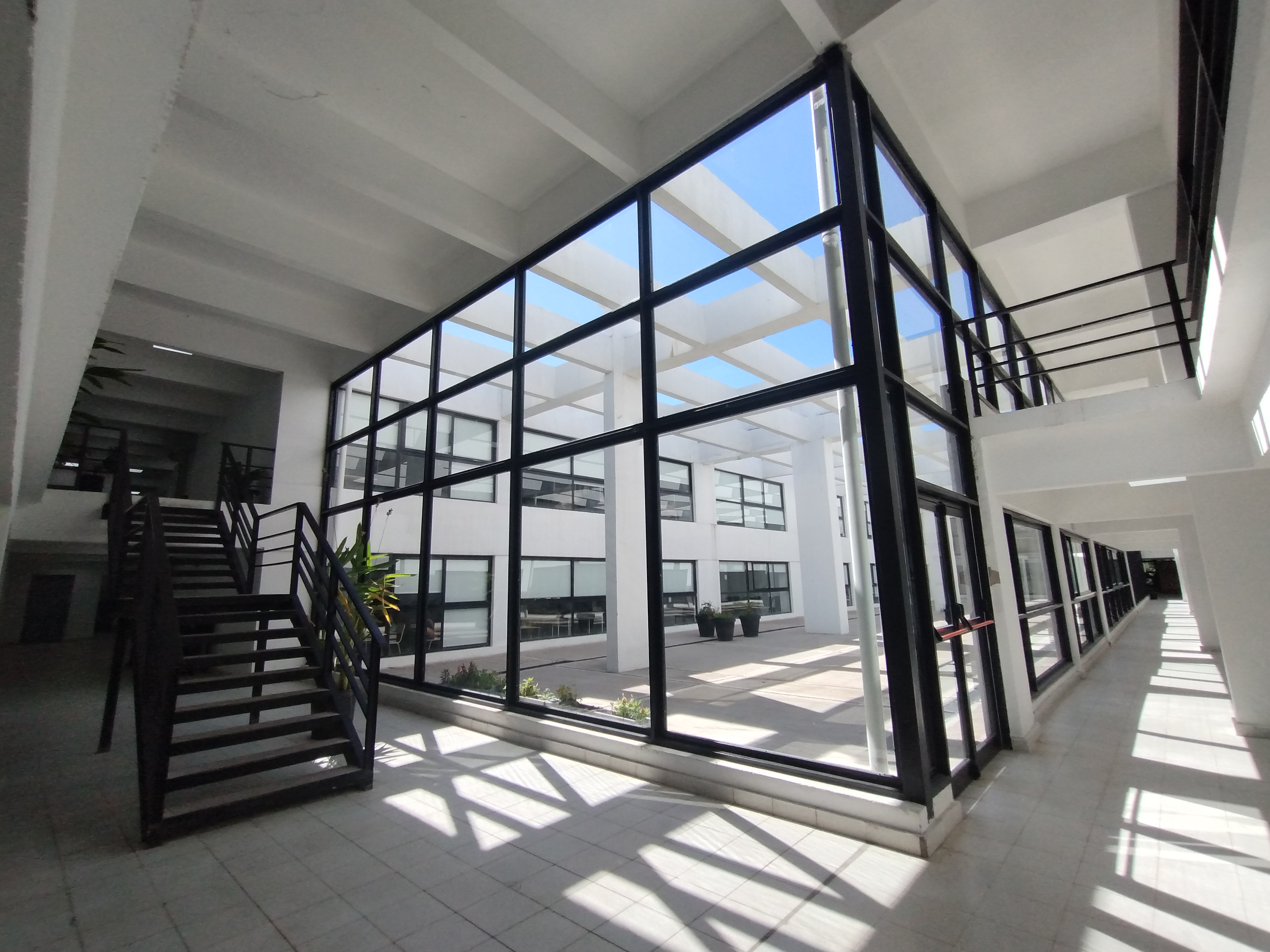
Interior of the Fourth Building of the campus

The courses were selected based on the needs of the industries that surround the campus, they are specially oriented toward the food and beverages industry, automotive industry and the metalworking industry.

The university is structured around four subdivisions: the Institute of Education, the Institute of Community Health, the Institute of Biotechnology and the Institute of Technology and Engineering.

== Extension ==
The university provides English and Chinese lectures for all the community.

The university created an institution called Centro PyME-UNAHUR, which provides technical and scientific assistance to small and medium-sized companies in the area.

== See also ==
- List of universities in Argentina
- Education in Argentina
