= National University of Villa María =

- Universidad Nacional de Villa María
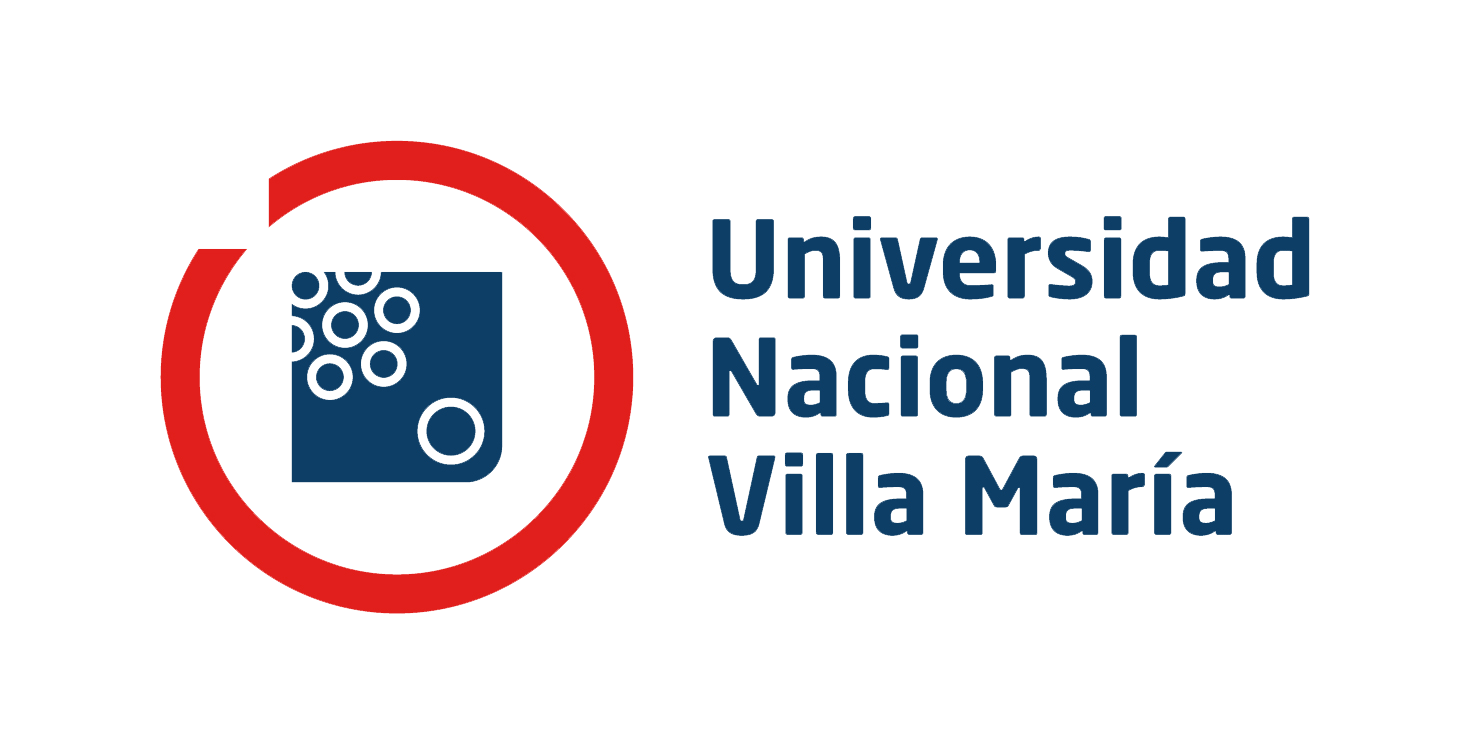
- Type: Public
- Established: 1995
- Faculty: 787 (2020)
- Students: 11,939 (2020)
- Location: Villa María, Córdoba, Argentina
- Website: http://www.unvm.edu.ar/

The National University of Villa María (Spanish: Universidad Nacional de Villa María) is an Argentine national university located city of Villa María in Córdoba Province. It has offices in the cities of: Villa del Rosario, Córdoba, and San Francisco.

== History ==
On December 21, 1994, the National Chamber of Deputies approved the project to create the UNVM. The bill was definitively approved when Law No. 24,484 creating the UNVM was passed with a single vote by the Senate in April of the following year. Shortly after the National Executive Power promulgated the law, on April 19, 1995. In September of that year, the Ministry of Education and Culture appointed accountant Carlos Domínguez as Normalizing Rector.

In 2020, the UNVM had a population of 11,939 students, with an average annual growth of 10.7%. The university has 5000 graduates, of which 87% are the first university graduates compared to their parents. The average annual growth of graduates is 17.9%. The UNVM has 787 teachers and 296 node teachers; and a total of 992 teaching assignments.

With different activities that included seminars, courses, special chairs, cultural exhibitions, television programs and a documentary, among other events; UNVM celebrated its 25th anniversary in 2020.

== Campus ==
The main campus is located at Av. Jauretche 1555, Villa María, Córdoba.

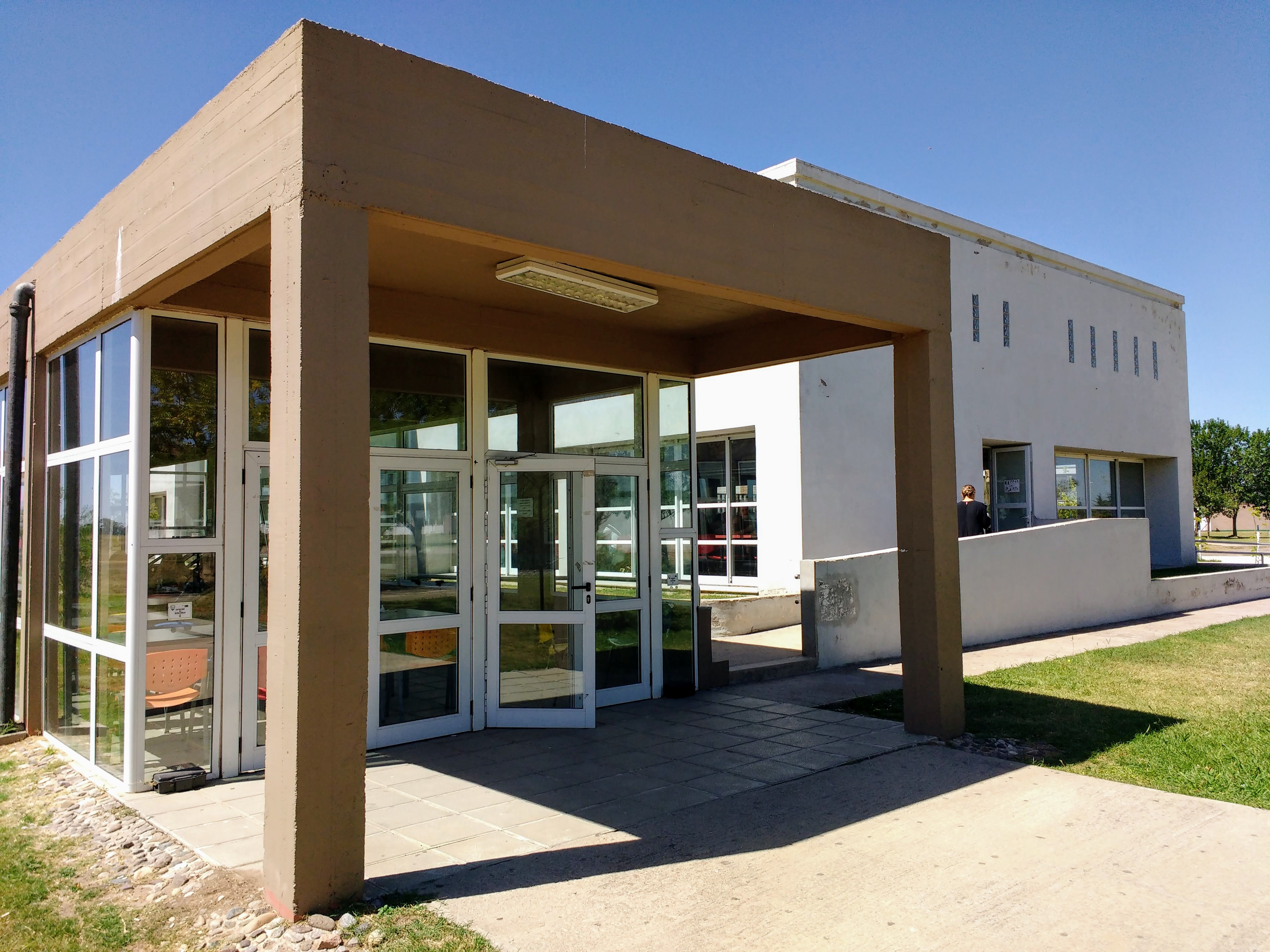
University cafeteria.

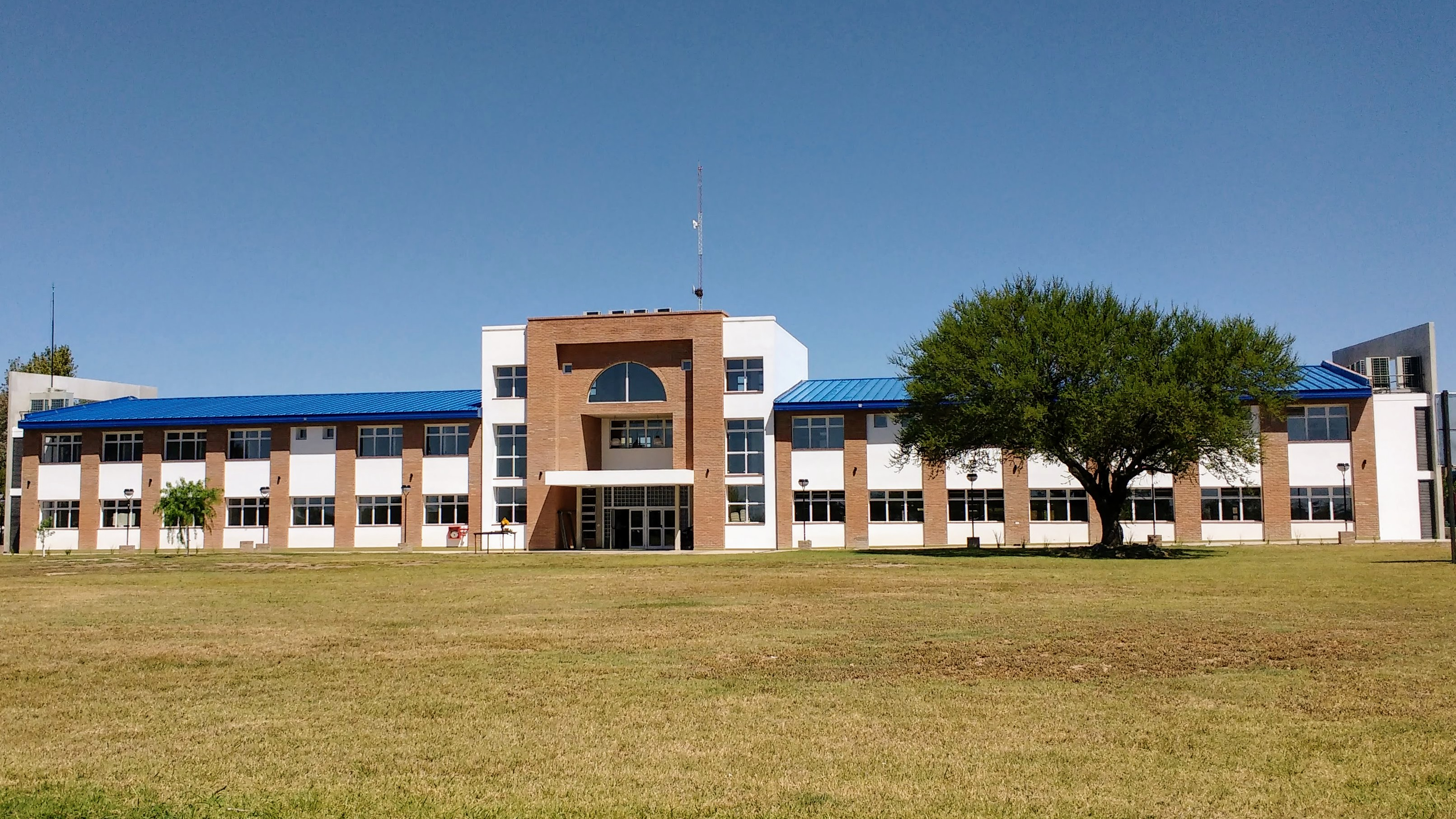
Classroom and research building.

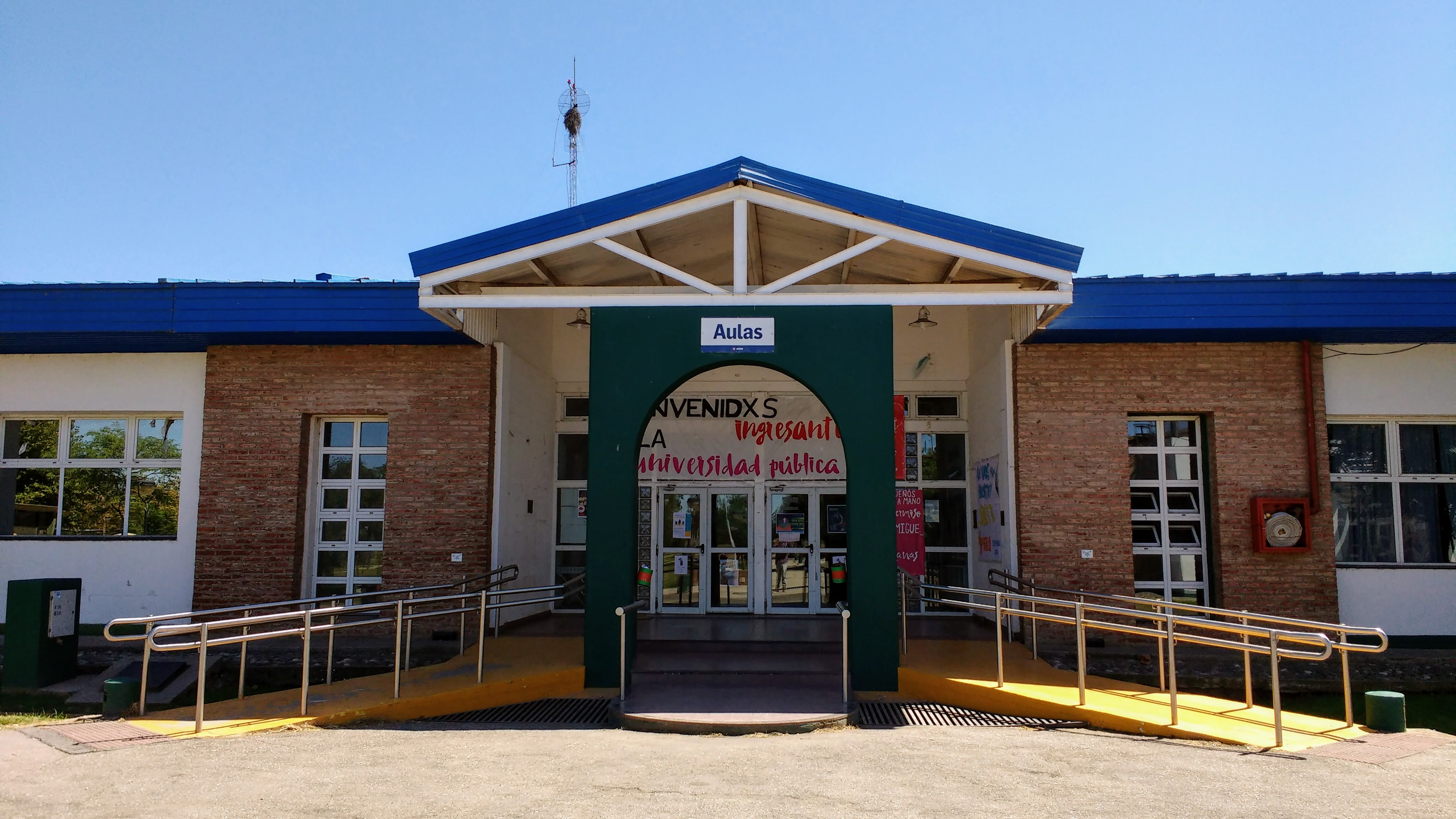
Classroom block.

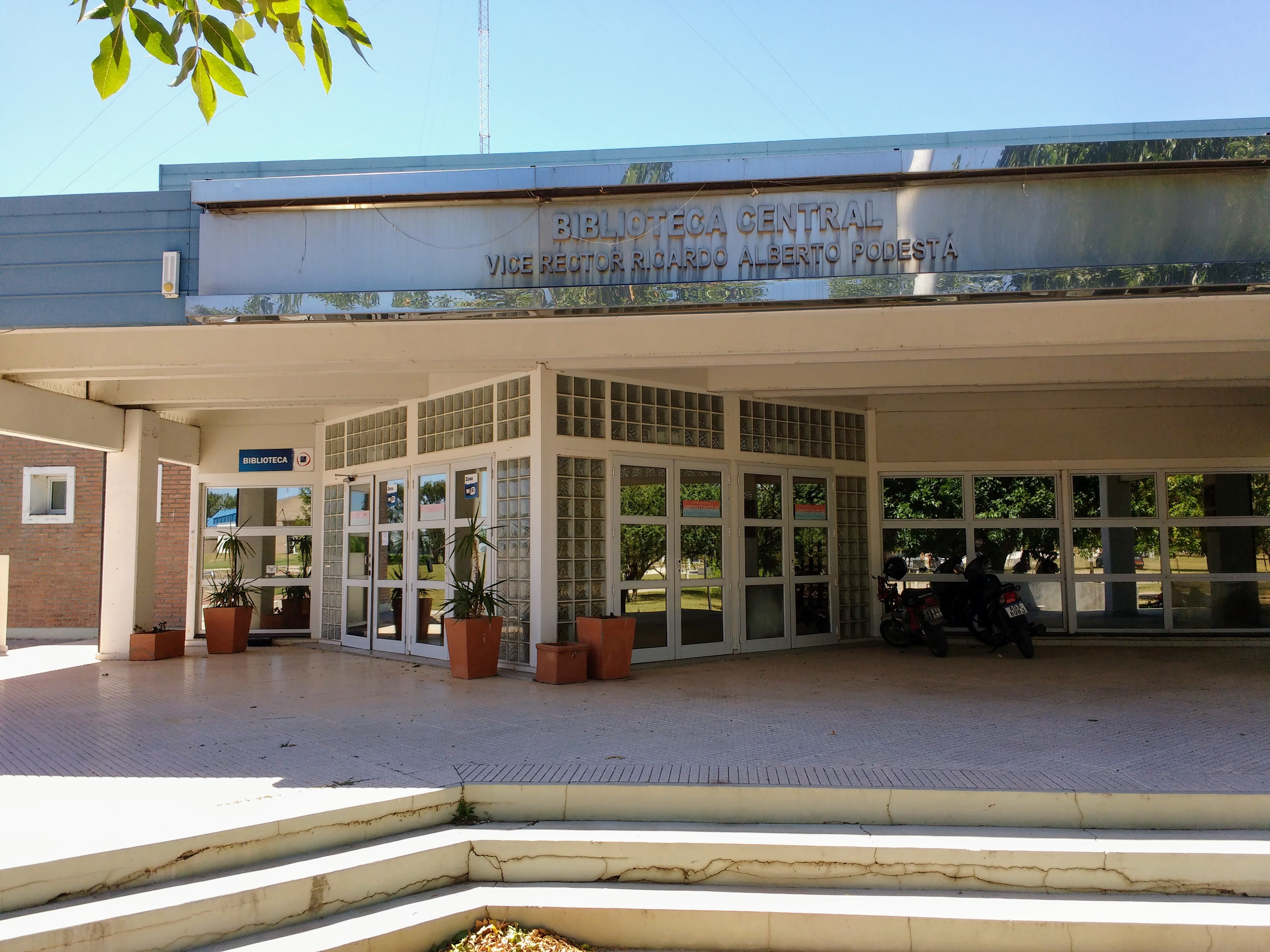
UNVM Main Library

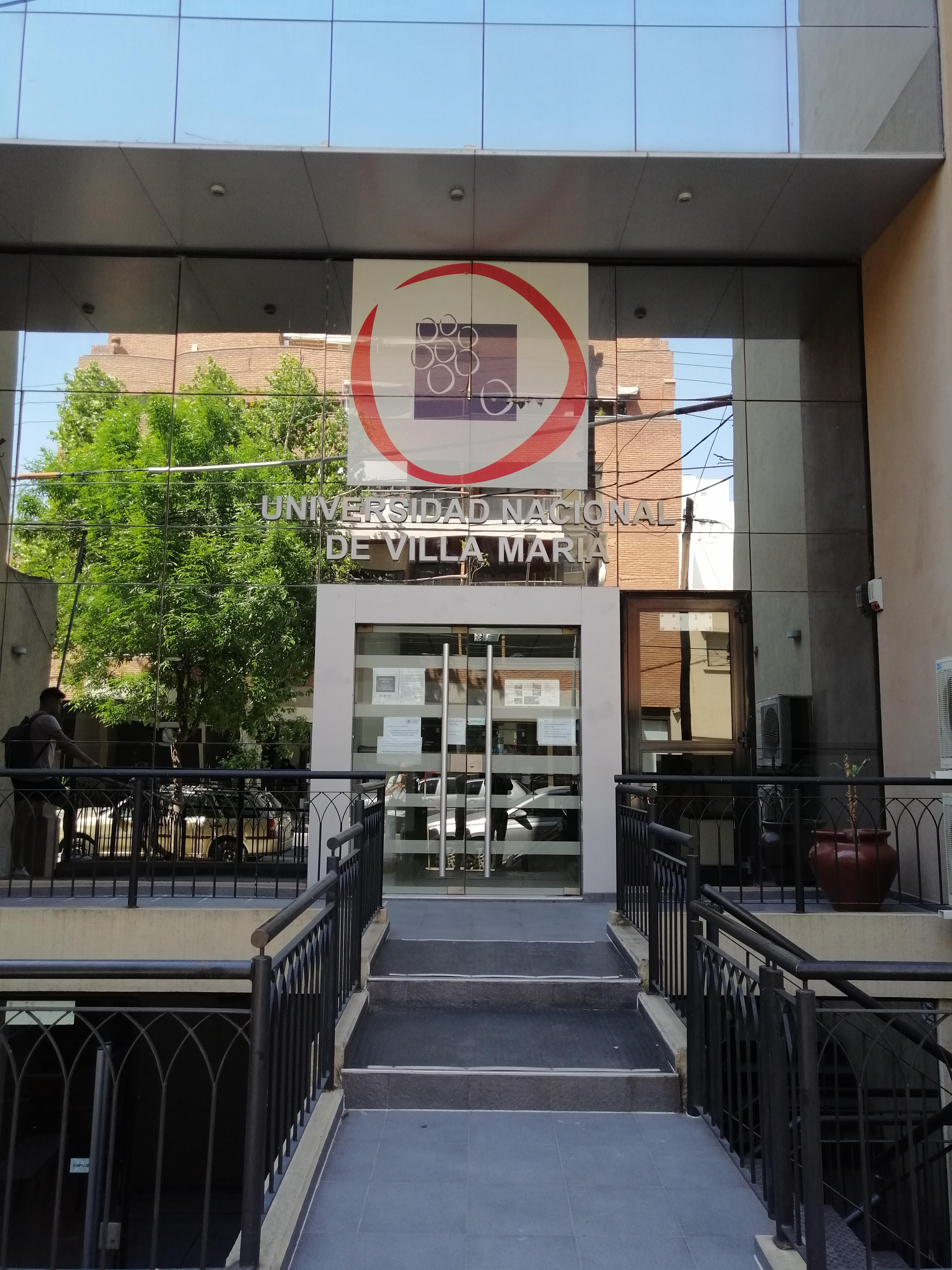
Córdoba Headquarters.

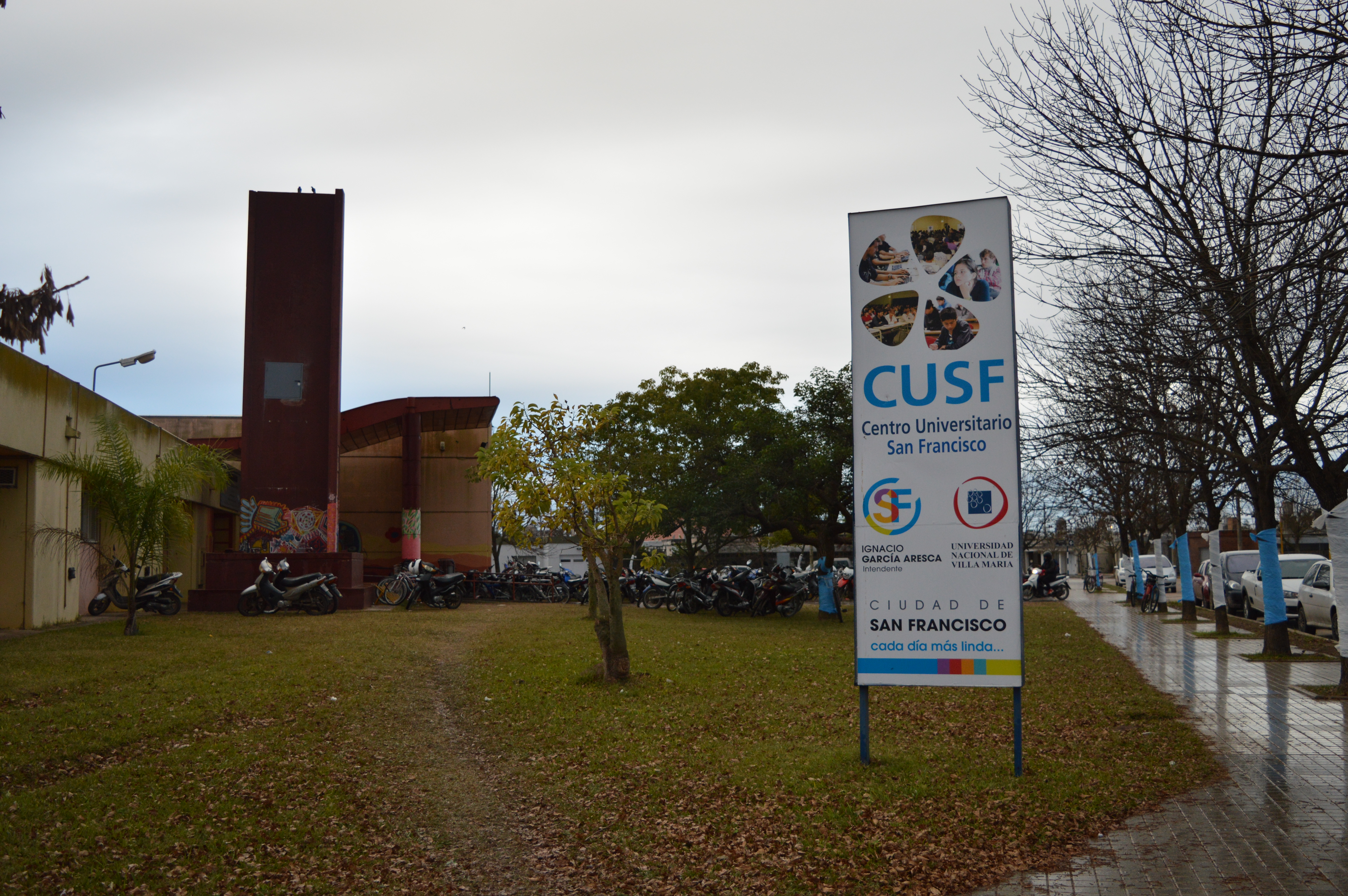
San Francisco University Center.

Córdoba: located at Calle 25 de Mayo 1065, General Paz neighborhood, City of Córdoba.

Villa del Rosario: located in Obispo Ferreyra 411, City of Villa del Rosario, Córdoba.

San Francisco: located in Trigueros 151 (IPEM 96 "Professor Pascual Bailón Sosa"), City of San Francisco, Córdoba.

== Academic units and careers ==
The National University of Villa María offers 43 undergraduate, graduate and postgraduate courses. They are organized in three Academic Pedagogical Institutes:

- Academic Pedagogical Institute of Basic and Applied Sciences
- Academic Pedagogical Institute of Human Sciences
- Academic Pedagogical Institute of Social Sciences

== Research and extension ==
The rector of the UNVM on the implementation of training workshops in penitentiaries.

The Research Institute provides financial support and/or academic endorsement to Research Projects and Programs developed at the National University of Villa María, with the aim of promoting the generation of knowledge, ensuring academic excellence and promoting the attention of strategic and priority issues at the national, regional, provincial level and at the National University of Villa María.

In the last decade, 1,370 research and extension activities were carried out, with 724 research projects financed between 2000 and 2019, and the participation of 1,393 people. The Extension Institute carried out 264 training activities in 2019; 71% of these activities were cultural or social. Since 2017, the institute's Scientific-Technological Transfer Directorate has trained 5,797 people.

== Dependencies ==
Isologotype of the Villa María University Publishing House

Central Library Vice-Rector Ricardo Alberto Podestá: Provides documentary resources and services to support teaching, research and dissemination of culture. It has a catalog of 34,000 volumes, in addition to managing the Institutional Repository.

EDUVIM: the Villa María University Publishing House was created in 2008 with the mission of providing the UNVM with an editorial label capable of publishing and disseminating the academic production generated locally. Over time, it expanded its editorial catalog on different fields of local and regional production, favoring exchanges with university publishers.

Integrated Media Center: the multimedia belonging to the UNVM. It is made up of Uniteve, a digital open television channel; FM Universidad, frequency modulated radio station; and Uniteve Noticias, an information portal for the city and the region. It was officially released on Thursday, June 26, 2016.

Usina Cultural: transdisciplinary cultural space of the National University of Villa María, inserted in territorial planning, educational, tourist and scientific policies. It is located at Avenida Sabattini 51, Villa María, Córdoba, Argentina.

Ardea Magazine: Journalistic space for the dissemination and generation of knowledge on contemporary issues related to art, science and culture.

== See also ==
- Argentine Universities
