= Arturo Jauretche National University =

University in Florencio Varela, Argentina

Coordinates: 34.776°S 58.268°W

- Universidad Nacional Arturo Jauretche
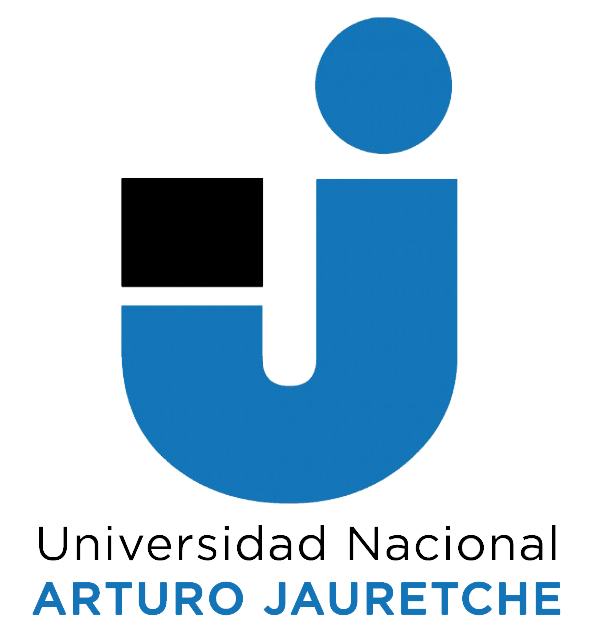
- Other name: UNAJ
- Type: Public and national
- Established: 29 December 2009; 16 years ago
- Rector: Arnaldo Medina
- Faculty: 758
- Students: 32,000
- Location: Av. Calchaquí 6200, Florencio Varela, Buenos Aires Province, Argentina
- Campus: Main campus: Florencio Varela • Berazategui
- Website: unaj.edu.ar

The Arturo Jauretche National University (Spanish: Universidad Nacional Arturo Jauretche; UNAJ) is a public university in Florencio Varela, Buenos Aires Province, Argentina.

The university was founded on December 29, 2009, when the Argentine National Congress approved Law 26.576, which contained its creation. It was named after Arturo Jauretche, a political thinker of the Radical Civic Union and later a prominent Peronist.

== Campus ==
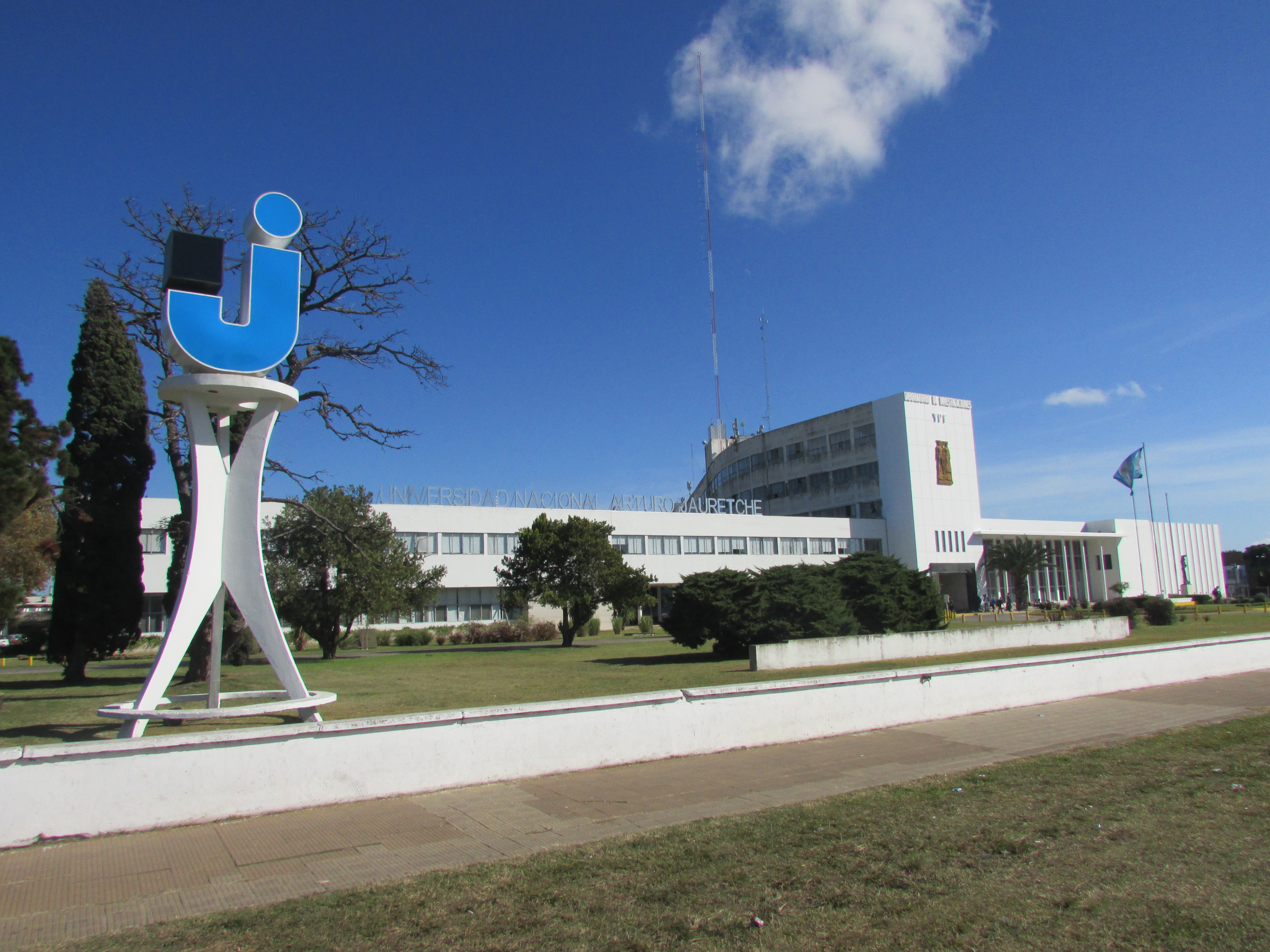
The campus of National University Arturo Jauretche in Florencio Varela, Argentina

The university is located in former YPF Research Labs inaugurated in 1942. The labs were the most advanced in Latin America by the time of their inauguration, 550 people worked in them and many scientific breakthroughs happened there, such as the creation of Elaion, the most popular motor oil of Argentina. The labs closed in 1994 and two decades later, YPF permitted the university to use the building free of charge in order to accommodate the university.

In 2012, the educational center received the National SCA/CICoP Prize awarded by the Argentine Central Society of Architects (Sociedad Central de Arquitectos) for the category "Restoration and Enhancement of Works over 1,000 square meters."

In 2022, the university benefited from funding for three infrastructure projects through the Complementary Works Program of the National Ministry of Education: the installation of a fire suppression system in the Mosconi Building, a clinical simulation center, and improvements to perimeter lighting and security.

== Academic structure ==
The university consists of three institutes: the Institute of Engineering and Agronomy, the Institute of Health Sciences and the Institute of Social Sciences and Administration. They provide several courses such as Industrial Engineering, Medicine, Biochemistry, Economics and Business.

== Courses ==
=== Undergraduate courses ===
- Medicine
- Biochemistry
- Nursing
- Kinesiology and Physiatry
- Organization and Assistance of Operating Rooms
- Obstetrics
- Sanitary Emergencies and Disasters
- Hospital Pharmacy
- Clinical Information and Patient Administration
- Oil Engineering
- Bioengineering
- Electromechanical Engineering
- Computer Engineering
- Industrial Engineering
- Agrarian Sciences
- Agrarian Administration
- Transportation Engineering
- Economics
- Social Work
- Business

=== Graduate courses ===
- Environmental Education for Sustainability
- Translational Research for Health
- Public Administration
- Health Networks
- Neurosciences
- Data Science
- Conurbano Studies
- Nursing Sciences

== Media ==
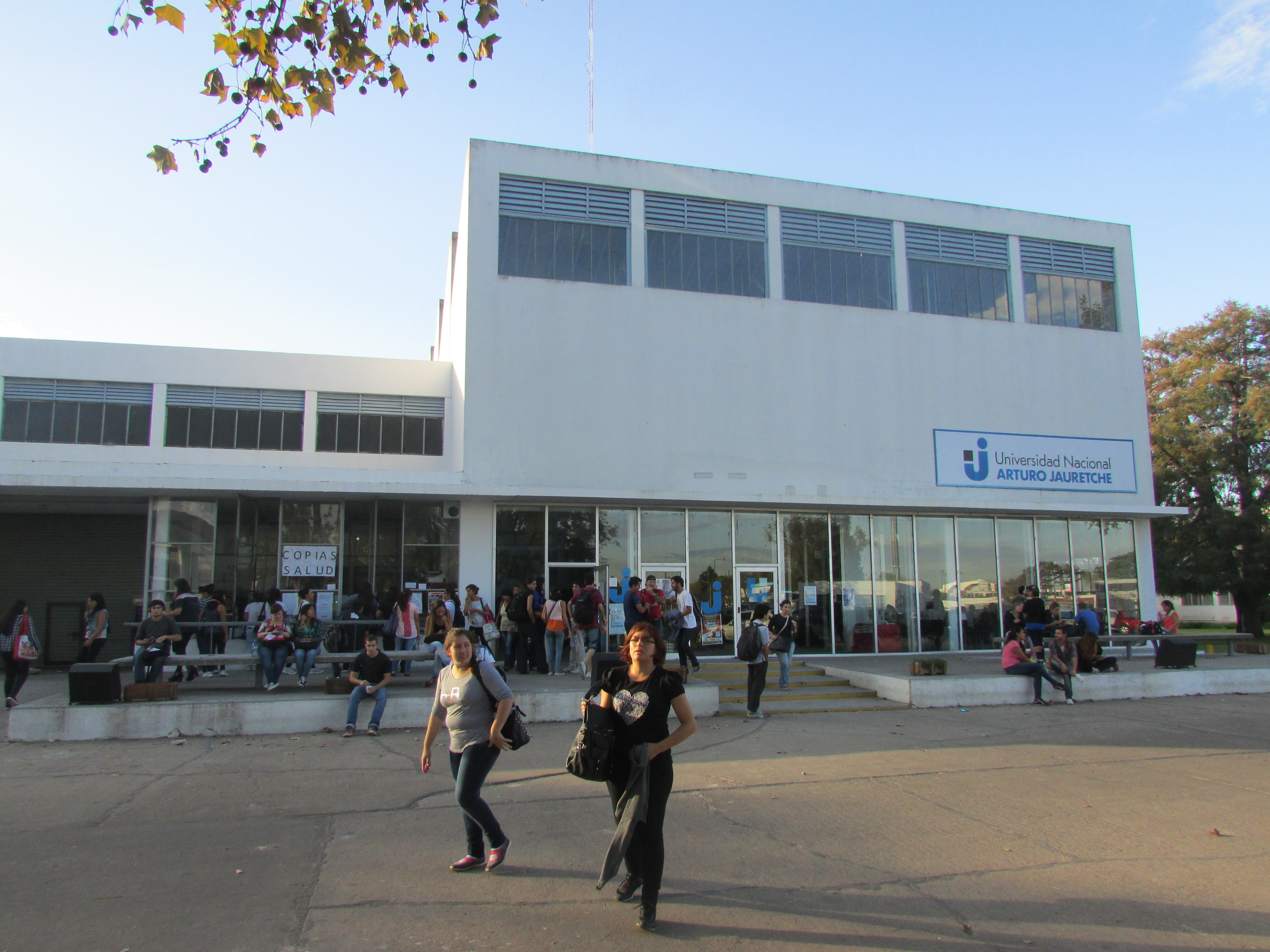
The Savio Sector of the Campus

The university owns a radio station, a digital magazine and an online TV broadcasting website. The Revista Mestiza (the university's digital magazine) publishes articles written by professors and students, related to politics and culture.

== International cooperation ==
The Arturo Jauretche National University is a founding member of the International Web of Academic Cooperation (COMPA) along with other universities from Colombia, Mexico and Peru.

== See also ==
- List of universities in Argentina
- Education in Argentina
