= University of Cuenca del Plata =

Coordinates: 27.4746°S 58.8527°W

Universidad de la Cuenca del Plata
- Universidad de la Cuenca del Plata
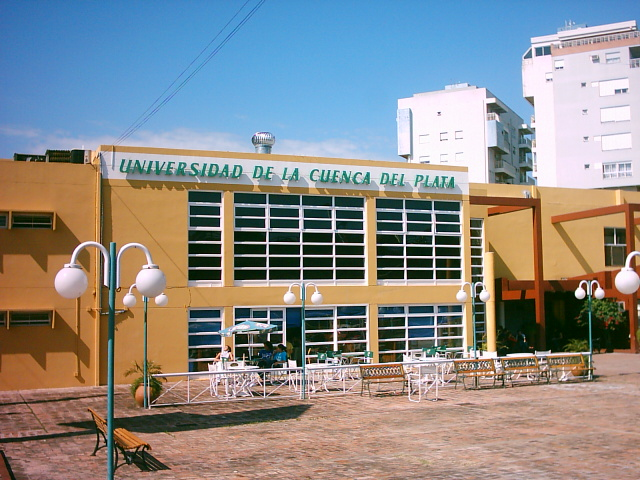
- Type: Private
- Students: (2009)
- Location: Corrientes, Argentina
- Campus: Corrientes
- Website: UCP

The River Plate Basin University (in Spanish: Universidad de la Cuenca del Plata - UCP) is a non-profit private university founded in 1991. Located in the province of Corrientes, Argentina, it has an undergraduate enrollment of 1,100 students and a graduate enrollment of 600.

The university is focused primarily on social sciences and engineering. The undergraduates majors available are accountancy, business administration, law, humanities.

== See also ==
- The Latin American Docta
- Science and Education in Argentina
- Argentine Higher Education Official Site
