= National University of Santiago del Estero =

Coordinates: 27.8010°S 64.2511°W

- Universidad Nacional de Santiago del Estero
- Type: Public
- Established: 1973
- Faculty: 972
- Students: 11,227
- Location: Santiago del Estero, Santiago del Estero Province, Argentina
- Campus: --
- Website: https://www.unse.edu.ar/

The National University of Santiago del Estero (Spanish: Universidad Nacional de Santiago del Estero) is an Argentine national university located in the capital of Santiago del Estero Province. Its 1973 establishment gathered the existing Tucumán University school of agronomy (1949) and the Córdoba University forestry institute (1958), as well as new schools created for the purpose.
