= National University of Austral Patagonia =

Coordinates: 46.4330°S 67.5205°W

- Universidad Nacional de la Patagonia Austral
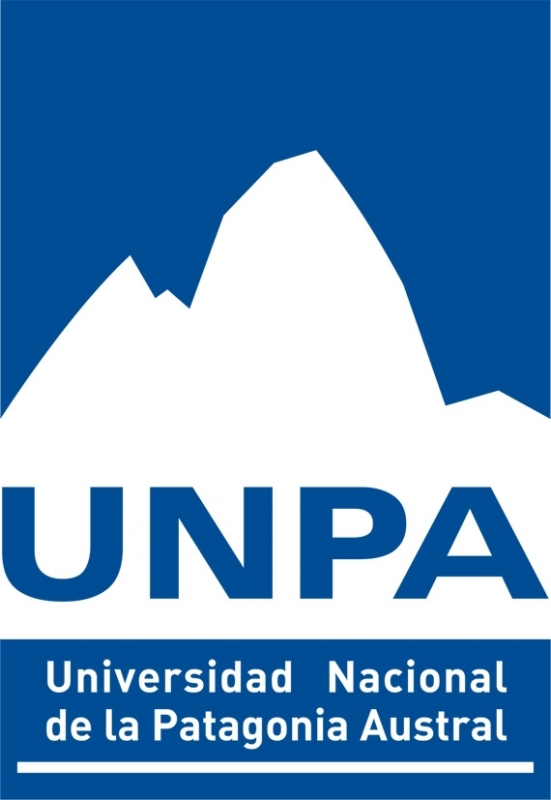
- Type: Public
- Established: 1995
- Faculty: 953
- Students: 7,068
- Location: Caleta Olivia, Río Gallegos, others, Santa Cruz Province, Argentina
- Campus: --
- Website: http://www.unpa.edu.ar/

The National University of Austral Patagonia (Spanish: Universidad Nacional de la Patagonia Austral) is an Argentine national university in Santa Cruz Province. The university is divided into four campuses, located in the cities of Caleta Olivia (UACO), Río Gallegos (UARG), San Julián (UASJ) and Río Turbio (UART), and was founded in 1995, by national law 24.446. As of 2015 it had about 7,000 students.

== See also ==
- Argentine Universities
