= National University of Tucumán =

Public university in Argentina

Coordinates: 26.8422°S 65.2313°W

- Universidad Nacional de Tucumán
- Motto: Pedes in terra ad sidera visus (Latin)
- Motto in English: Feet on the ground, eyes on the sky
- Type: Public
- Established: May 25, 1914; 112 years ago
- Rector: Alicia Bardón
- Vice-rector: José García
- Academic staff: 5,868
- Students: 62,872
- Location: San Miguel de Tucumán, Tucumán Province, Argentina
- Website: www.unt.edu.ar

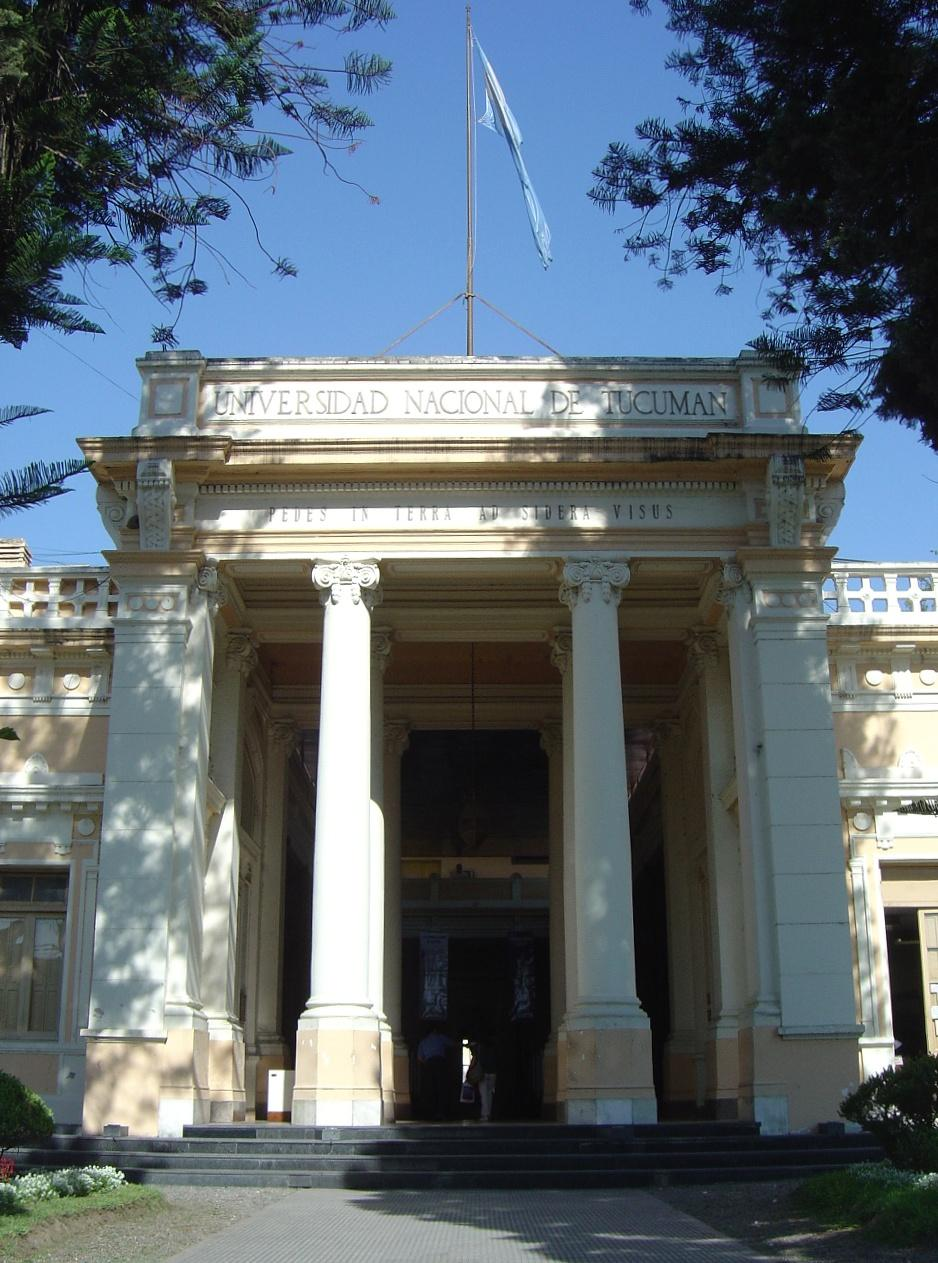
Rectorate building

The National University of Tucumán (Spanish: Universidad Nacional de Tucumán; UNT) is an Argentine national university located in Tucumán Province and the largest in Argentina's northwest region. Founded on 25 May 1914 in San Miguel de Tucumán, access to the university is unrestricted and free of charge.

== Organization ==
The university comprises 13 schools, 7 high schools, and 3 museums.

=== Schools ===
- Facultad de Agronomía y Zootecnia (School of Agronomy and Zootechnics)
- Facultad de Arquitectura y Urbanismo (School of Architecture and Urbanism)
- Facultad de Artes (School of Arts)
- Facultad de Bioquímica, Química y Farmacia (School of Biochemistry, Chemistry and Pharmacy)
- Facultad de Ciencias Económicas (School of Economics)
- Facultad de Ciencias Exactas y Tecnología (School of Exact Sciences and Technology)
- Facultad de Ciencias Naturales (School of Natural Science)
- Facultad de Derecho y Ciencias Sociales (School of Law and Social Science)
- Facultad de Educación Física (School of Physical Education)
- Facultad de Filosofía y Letras (School of Philosophy and Letters)
- Facultad de Medicina (School of Medicine)
- Facultad de Odontología (School of Dentistry)
- Facultad de Psicología (School of Psychology)

=== High schools ===
- Escuela de Agricultura y Sacarotecnia (School of Agriculture)
- Escuela de Bellas Artes (School of Fine Art)
- Escuela y Liceo Vocacional Sarmiento (School and Vocational Lyceum Sarmiento)
- Instituto Superior de Música (Superior Institute of Music)
- Gymnasium de la Universidad Nacional de Tucumán (Gymnasium of the National University of Tucumán)
- Instituto Técnico (Technical Institute)
- Instituto Técnico de Aguilares (Technical Institute of Aguilares)

=== Museums ===
- Instituto de Arqueología y Museo (Institute and Museum of Archaeology)
- Museo de la Universidad Nacional de Tucumán (Museum of the National University of Tucumán)
- Museo Miguel Lillo de Ciencias Naturales (Museum of Natural Science Miguel Lillo)

== Notable alumni ==
- Katharina Beck (born 1982), politician
- Cástulo Guerra (born 1945), actor
- Leda Valladares (1919-2012), composer
- César Pelli (1926-2019), architect

== See also ==
- Argentine university reform of 1918
- List of Argentine universities
- Science and technology in Argentina
