= San Vicente, Misiones =

San Vicente (Misiones)
- Municipality and village
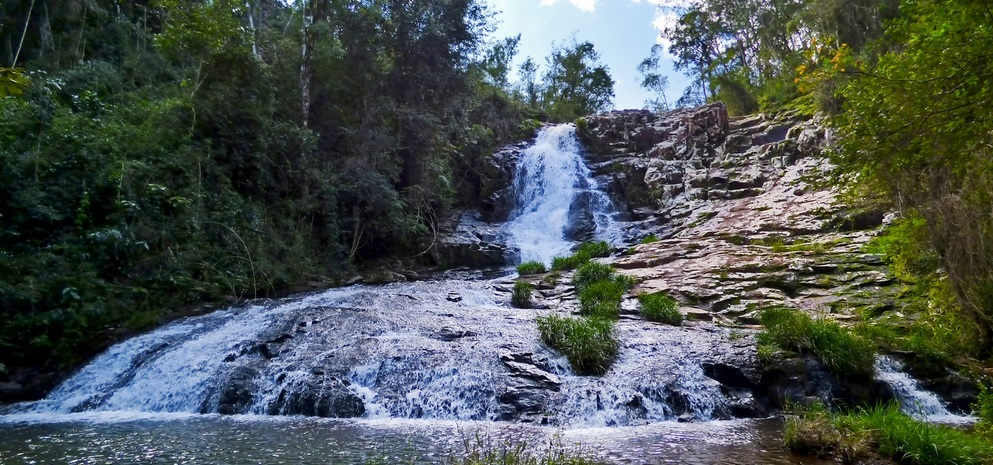

- Location within Misiones Province Location within Argentina
- Country: Argentina
- Province: Misiones Province

Government
  - Intendant: Sergio Fabián Rodríguez

Population (2010)
  - Total: 65,754
- Time zone: UTC−3 (ART)

San Vicente (Misiones) is a village and municipality in Misiones Province in north-eastern Argentina.
