= Argentine Atlantis University =

Argentine Atlantis University is a university in Buenos Aires, Argentina.
