= Ungdommens Naturvidenskabelige Forening =

Ungdommens Naturvidenskabelige Forening (UNF) (English: The Danish Youth Association of Science) is an association for young Danish people interested in science. It was founded in 1944 by interested high school teachers who were members of the society for the spreading of knowledge of the natural sciences (Danish: Selskabet for Naturlærens Udbredelse, SNU). The primary purpose of the association is to promote science to youth and give the already interested youth the possibility to gain a deeper insight in science.

The national association, UNF Danmark, has five local chapters in the major cities; Copenhagen, Aarhus, Odense, Lyngby, and Aalborg.

National Presidents of UNF
År	Navn
2020-	Mads Frimann Madsen
2019–2020	Søren Beck
2018–2019	Nikolaj Simling
2018	Beatrice Nyhus
2017–2018	Rasmus Rahbek Østergaard
2016–2017	Jakob Peter Thorsbro
2014–2016	Milena Laban
2013–2014	Cecilie Nøhr Pedersen
2013	Nils-Asbjørn Frederiksen
2012–2013	Freja Elbro
2011–2012	Steffen Stokbæk
2010–2011	Line Guldbrand
2010	Christian Brædstrup
2008–2010	Rune Thode Nielsen
2007–2008	Danny K. Malkowski
2007	Ingo Nielsen
2006–2007	Mathias Bach Poulsen
2005–2006	Joan Ilsø Sørensen
2004–2005	Johnny Hartvig Olsen
2002–2004	Torben Lund Skovhus

== ScienceCamps ==
Every year during the school summer holidays (July–August), UNF organises the so-called ScienceCamps. The aim of these ScienceCamps is to give young people an opportunity to meet others with similar interests and to spread interest in specific science subjects.

Over the years, UNF has organised ScienceCamps in the fields of Mathematics, Computer Science, Biotechnology, Physics, Chemistry, Medicine, Environmental Technology, ScienceShow, Game Development, Health Science, Artificial Intelligence, Machine Learning, and Software Development.

== Published material ==
A series of teaching material and a children's book have been published by the organization and is available on Danish libraries.
