= Science and technology in Argentina =

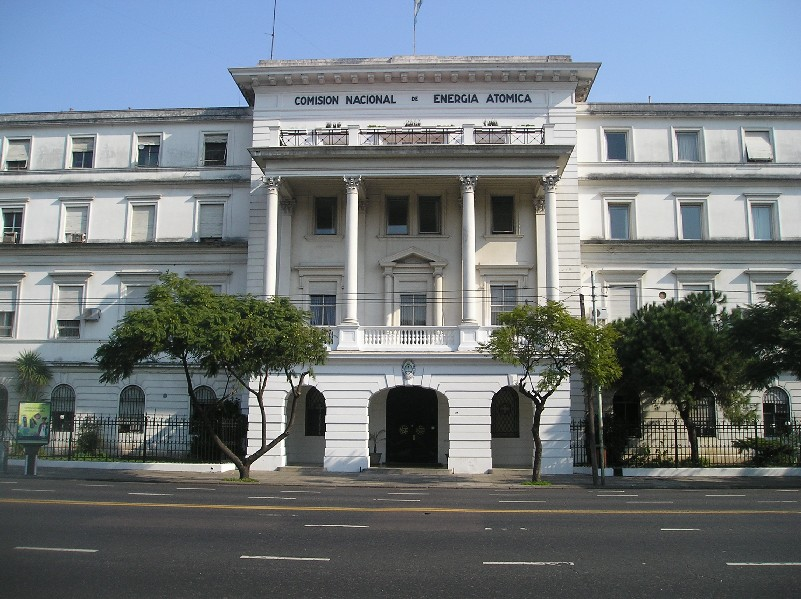
The National Atomic Energy Commission. Established in 1950, it was the world's first outside either the U.S. or the U.S.S.R. and had created a research reactor by 1957.

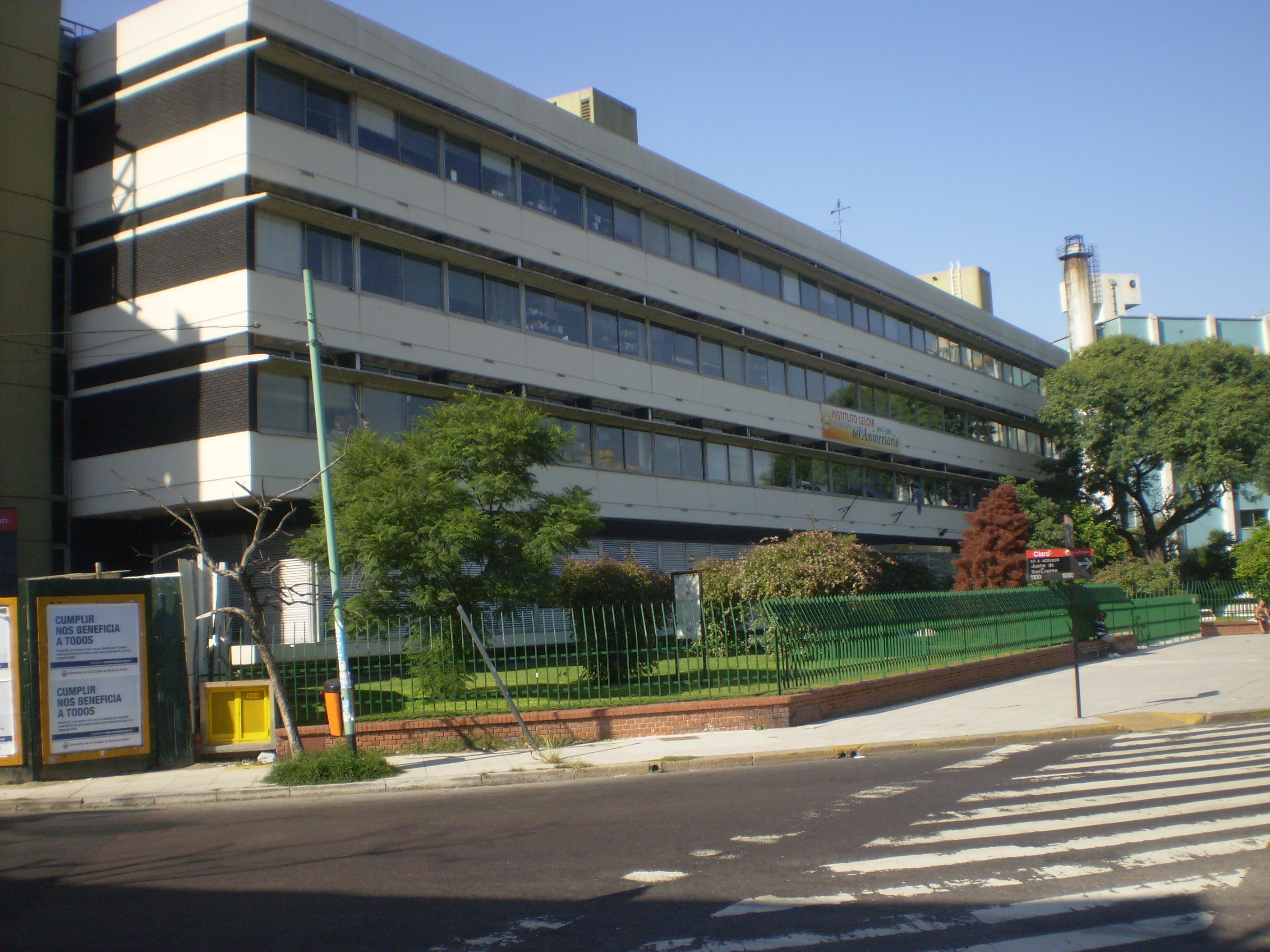
The Leloir Institute of biotechnology. Founded by Nobel Laureate Dr. Luis Leloir, it is among the most prestigious in its field in Latin America, and the world.

The most important aspects of science and technology in Argentina are concerned with medicine, nuclear physics, biotechnology, nanotechnology, space and rocket technology and several fields related to the country's main economic activities. According to the World Bank, Argentina exports in high-technology are products with high R&D intensity, such as in aerospace, computers, pharmaceuticals, scientific instruments, and electrical machinery. Benefiting from Latin America's highest literacy rates since shortly after President Domingo Faustino Sarmiento made primary education universally available in the 1860s and 1870s, Argentine researchers and professionals at home and abroad continue to enjoy a high standing in their fields. Argentine Bernardo Houssay was the first Latin American awarded with a Nobel Prize in sciences. Educated in a National University, Houssay went on to establish Argentina's National Research Council, a centerpiece in Argentine scientific and technological development, fifty years on. Many other Argentines have contributed to scientific development around the world, though sometimes having to emigrate to do so. Probably for that, the Argentine education is referred as the Latin American docta (in Spanish: La docta Latinoamericana), which originates from the Latin docta (learned). Argentina was ranked 77th in the Global Innovation Index in 2025.

== Eminences in their fields ==
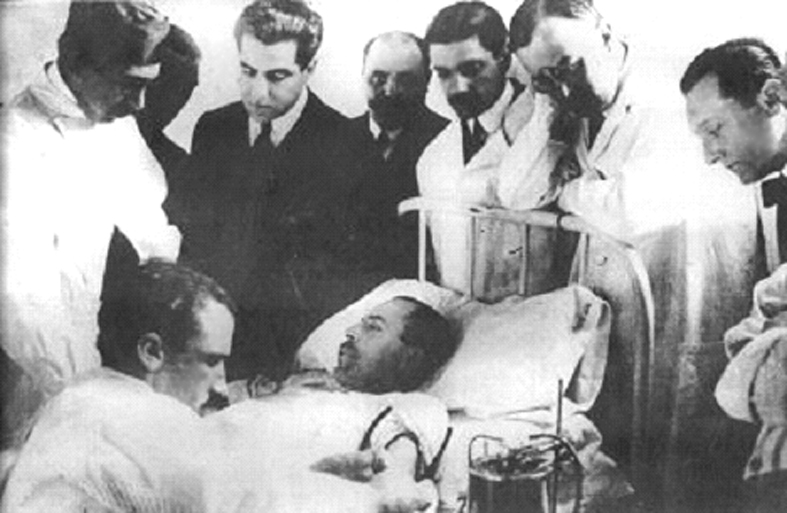
Dr. Luis Agote (second from right) overseeing the first safe and effective blood transfusion (1914)

Despite its modest budget and numerous setbacks, academics and the sciences in Argentina have enjoyed international respect since the turn of the 1900s, when Dr. Luis Agote devised the first safe and effective means of blood transfusion as well as René Favaloro, who was a pioneer in the improvement of the bypass surgery. Argentina is the Latin American country with the most Nobel Prize laureates; and has three Nobel Prize winners in the sciences: Bernardo Houssay in Physiology or Medicine in 1947, Luis Federico Leloir in Chemistry in 1970, and César Milstein in Physiology or Medicine in 1984. Dr. Domingo Liotta created the first artificial heart in 1969, revolutionizing the heart transplant field.

They have also contributed to bioscience in efforts like the Human Genome Project, where Argentine scientists have successfully mapped the genome of a living being, a world first. Argentina has its own satellite programme, nuclear power station designs (4th generation) and public nuclear energy company INVAP, which provides several countries with nuclear reactors.

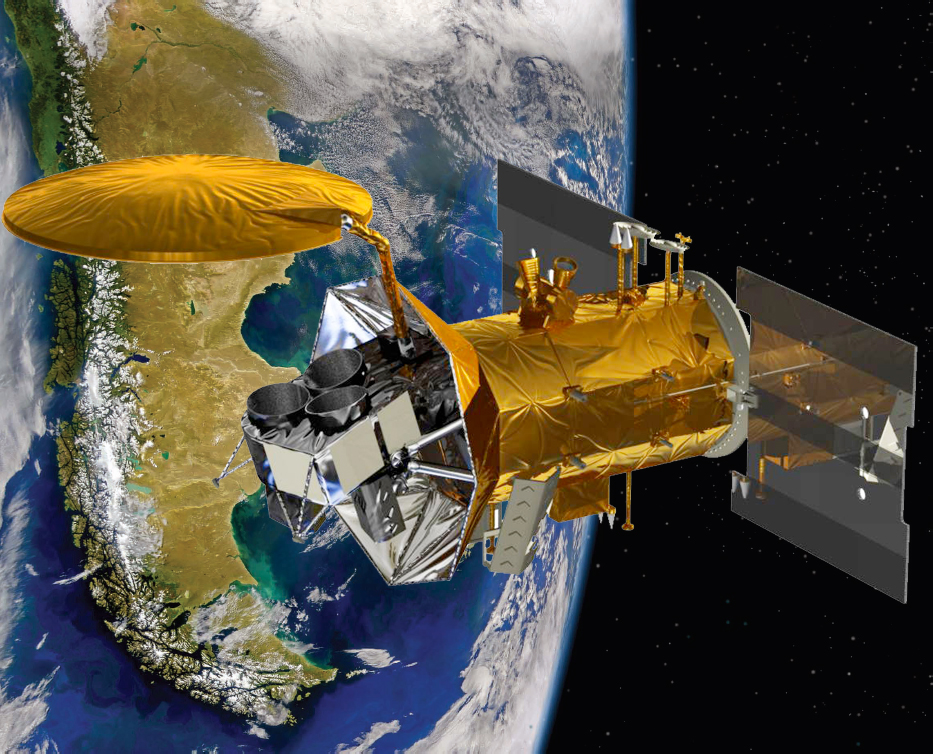
SAC-D satellite

Other projects are focusing on IS, nanotechnology, biotechnology, helicopters, farming machinery and military defensive systems. Established in 1991, the CONAE has since launched 8 indigenous built satellites successfully, AMSAT, MuSat, SAC-B, SAC-A, SAC-C, SAC-D/Aquarius, ARSAT I and ARSAT-2. In June 2009, secured an agreement with the European Space Agency on for the installation of a 35-m diameter antenna and other mission support facilities at the Pierre Auger Observatory. The facility will contribute to numerous ESA space probes, as well as CONAE's own, domestic research projects. Chosen from 20 potential sites and one of only three such ESA installations in the world, the new antenna will create a triangulation which will allow the ESA to ensure mission coverage around the clock.

Social sciences have a particularly strong tradition in Argentina. Home to 122 think tanks specializing in public policy and economics issues, Argentina ranks fifth in the number of these institutions worldwide.

In April 2009, Dr. Sandra Díaz, researcher from the Instituto Multidisciplinario de Biologia Vegetal (IMBIV - NU of C), was elected as a foreign associate member to the National Academy of Sciences (U.S.A.) in recognition of her outstanding work on climate change, being the first Hispanic woman to achieve this honor. Moreover, Dr. Diaz won the Nobel Peace Prize in 2007 as a member of the Intergovernmental Panel on Climate Change.

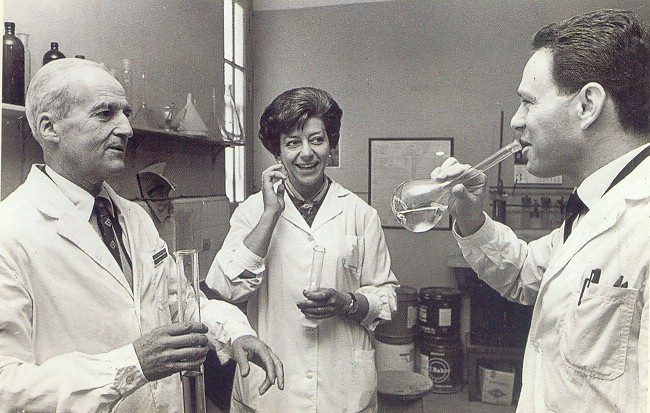
Dr. Luis Federico Leloir (left) and his staff toast his 1970 Nobel Prize in Chemistry.

Currently there are further outstanding Argentine researchers in the mentioned institution as Alberto Carlos Frasch (NU of SAM), Armando Parodi (NU of SAM - Leloir Institute), and Francisco de la Cruz (Balseiro Institute - NU of Cu).

Among the public institutions devoted to research and development in Argentina are:

- CITEDEF: Defense Scientific and Technical Research Institute
- CNEA: National Atomic Energy Commission
- CONAE: National Space Activities Commission
- CONICET: the National Research Council
- INTA: National Agricultural Technology Institute
- INTI: National Industrial Technology Institute
- INVAP: Argentine high-technology research & development company

== A well-educated work force ==
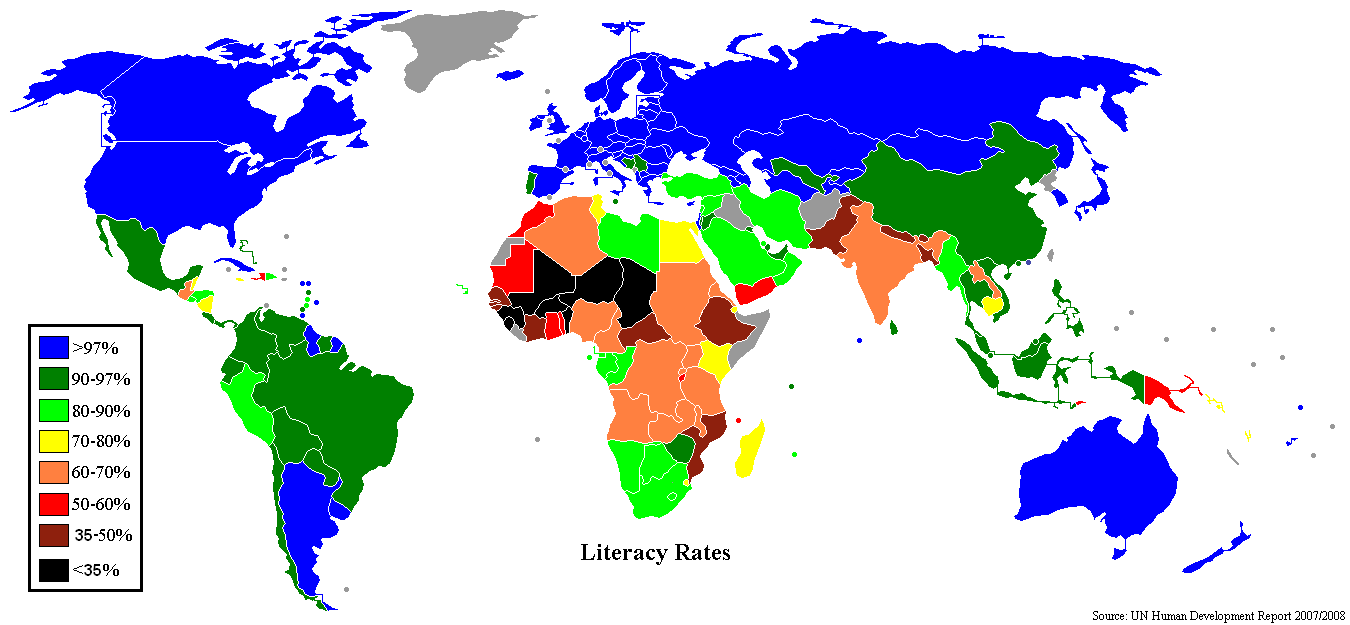
Literacy Level

Four out of five Argentine adults have completed grade school, over a third have completed their secondary education and one in nine Argentine adults have college degrees. Likewise, Argentina has the highest rate of university students in Latin America, besides having more within the southern hemisphere with professors and institutions awarded prestigious prizes and fellowships from philanthropic institutions like the John S. Guggenheim Foundation awards or the Howard Hughes Medical Institute, to name a few. Official sources recently reported roughly 1,500,000 college students within the Argentine University System; this represents the highest rate - relative to its total population - of academic students in Latin America and exceeds the ratio in many developed countries.

== Overview of policy environment, 2015–2019 ==
Upon taking office in December 2015, the Macri government set out eight goals and 100 priority initiatives to foster socioeconomic development. A number of these have links to the SDGs. Accordingly, through the National Council for the Coordination of Social Policies (CNCPS), the government established the National Inter-Institutional Commission for the Implementation and Monitoring of the SDGs, of which the Vice-Ministry of Science and Technology is a member.

A review found that progress had been made by 2018 towards aligning national priorities with the SDGs and in setting up adequate monitoring mechanisms. The government budget dedicated to research and development (R&D) and higher education also supports most of the national research institutes. This budget has decreased since 2015.

Although research intensity has dipped only slightly since 2015, other signs suggest that a lower priority is being accorded to science, technology and innovation; research and infrastructure projects have been cut back or cancelled in the following areas: the extension of satellite networks and radar; the expansion of the nuclear industry; and support for industrial and agricultural R&D through their respective technological institutes. In 2018, the Ministry of Science, Technology and Innovation was downgraded in the administrative hierarchy to a Secretariat of State under the Ministry of Education.

These quantitative and qualitative changes are likely to have perturbed the growth rate of scientific articles, which has been slow and irregular since 2011. Meanwhile, sectoral funds remain important programmes in Argentina, particularly FONSOFT, promoting the software industry and FONARSEC, the Argentine Sectoral Fund which focuses on medical, optical and precision instruments, machinery and electrical appliances. These sectoral funds are managed by the National Agency for Scientific and Technological Promotion (ANPCyT), with public and private counterparts.

== See also ==
- Education in Argentina
- List of universities in Argentina
- Argentine defense industry
- Spanish language in science and technology

== Sources ==
This article incorporates text from a free content work. Licensed under CC BY-SA 3.0 IGO. Text taken from Latin America. In: UNESCO Science Report: the Race Against Time for Smarter Development., Gabriela Dutrénit, Carlos Aguirre-Bastos, Martín Puchet and Mónica Salazar, UNESCO.
