= Troncos del Talar =

City in Buenos Aires, Argentina.

- City
- Location in Greater Buenos Aires
- Coordinates: 34°27′S 58°37′W
- Country: Argentina
- Province: Buenos Aires
- Partido: Tigre
- First land subdivision: 1949

Government
  - Intendant: Julio Zamora (UP)
  - Municipal delegate: Sebastián García Cupido

Population (2010 census [INDEC])
  - Total: 56,567
- CPA Base: B 1608
- Area code: +54 011

Troncos del Talar is a locality in Tigre Partido in Buenos Aires Province, Argentina. It forms part of the Greater Buenos Aires urban conurbation in the northern zone of the metropolitan area.

== History ==
The lands that would become Troncos del Talar originally belonged to General Ángel Pacheco, who acquired them from the López Camelo family. On the El Talar estate, José Felipe Pacheco Reynoso, son of General Ángel Pacheco, ordered the construction of a building so grand it was called El Castillo (The Castle). Access to the estate was by boat through a channel called Zanjón de Pacheco, which connected the Río de Las Conchas with the estate, or by land across a private toll bridge over the river.

In 1876, the Buenos Aires and Campana Railway crossed the partido and General Pacheco station was opened. The area east of the tracks became known as Troncos del Talar, considered an ideal location for collecting tala wood needed for the rural establishment.

In 1949, following a land subdivision by the company Legarreta, Tomas, Serra y Cía. S.R.L., the first land sales took place, marking the formal beginning of the locality. Route 197 was subsequently paved and the population organized itself by creating clubs, development societies, schools, and chapels.

In the 1960s, the Reconquista River Relief Canal, also known as the National Rowing Course, was built. The Tigre Industrial Park was established, and in the 1990s, a new bridge was built over the Reconquista River and Larralde Avenue, connecting the neighborhood with the Acceso Norte.

The area's growth led to the separation of this zone from General Pacheco, creating the Municipal Delegation of Troncos del Talar. Streets were paved and illuminated, and new services arrived, including a fire station, the Tigre Emergency Service, and a sports complex. Gated communities were developed, necessitating the construction of the Bancalari-Benavídez road. In recent years, the locality has received a library, police station, health center, ophthalmology center, prosecutor's office, and the Tigre Operations Center.

=== Coat of arms ===
On 26 October 2010, the Honorable Deliberative Council of Tigre approved the coat of arms of Troncos del Talar. The coat of arms features four symbols representing the locality's history: the Sacred Heart of Jesus image placed at the entrance in 1956, School No. 31 as the first educational establishment, the Taurita Bridge built in 1927 over the Las Conchas River, and the water tank constructed in the early 1950s that served as the only water source for the first settlers.

== Geography ==
Troncos del Talar lies within the floodplain area of the Reconquista basin in the northwest of Tigre Partido. It borders Tigre, Rincón de Milberg, Nordelta, General Pacheco, Don Torcuato, and San Fernando, and is connected by the local road network to Route 197 and the Acceso Norte.

== Demographics ==
According to the 2010 census [INDEC], the locality had a population of 56,567.

== Economy ==
Troncos del Talar contains the Parque Industrial de Tigre, an established industrial zone that concentrates warehousing, light industry, and logistics businesses and contributes to the local economy. Commercial activity along main avenues serves the residential population.

== Public services ==
Troncos del Talar houses the Tigre Operations Center (Centro de Operaciones Tigre or COT).

The COT is the operational hub managing the "Alerta Tigre" system. It administers over 800 security cameras monitored by 300 agents throughout the day. The center deploys more than 30 municipal mobile units and 100 personnel to reinforce police patrols, assigning one municipal vehicle per police grid. (Note: The municipal vehicles are 4x4 Volkswagen Amarok pickup trucks equipped with LED electronic beacons, traffic distributors, six-tone sirens, VHF radios, and GPS. The fleet also includes a security boat crewed by two officers for preventative patrols of the waterways.) GPS devices are installed in these mobile units, as well as in patrol cars and ambulances traversing the municipal area. The center coordinates rotating controls with the General Directorate of Traffic, the Argentine Federal Police, the Argentine National Gendarmerie, and the Naval Prefecture.

== Sports ==
The locality has the Mariano Moreno sports complex, which offers activities including hockey, volleyball, football, and futsal. The San Patricio golf course is also located in the area. In 2022, a marathon was held in order to celebrate the 76th anniversary of Troncos del Talar.

== Religion ==
The city belongs to the Roman Catholic Diocese of San Isidro. Its main parish is Nuestra Señora de Guadalupe. The locality also has several chapels: Nuestra Señora de Luján, Nuestra Señora de Fátima, Sagrado Corazón de Jesús, San José, San Juan Bautista, Sagrada Familia, Medalla Milagrosa, Señora de Caacupé, Virgen de Itatí, and San Cayetano.
