= El Talar, Buenos Aires =

City in Buenos Aires, Argentina

El Talar El Talar de Pacheco
- City
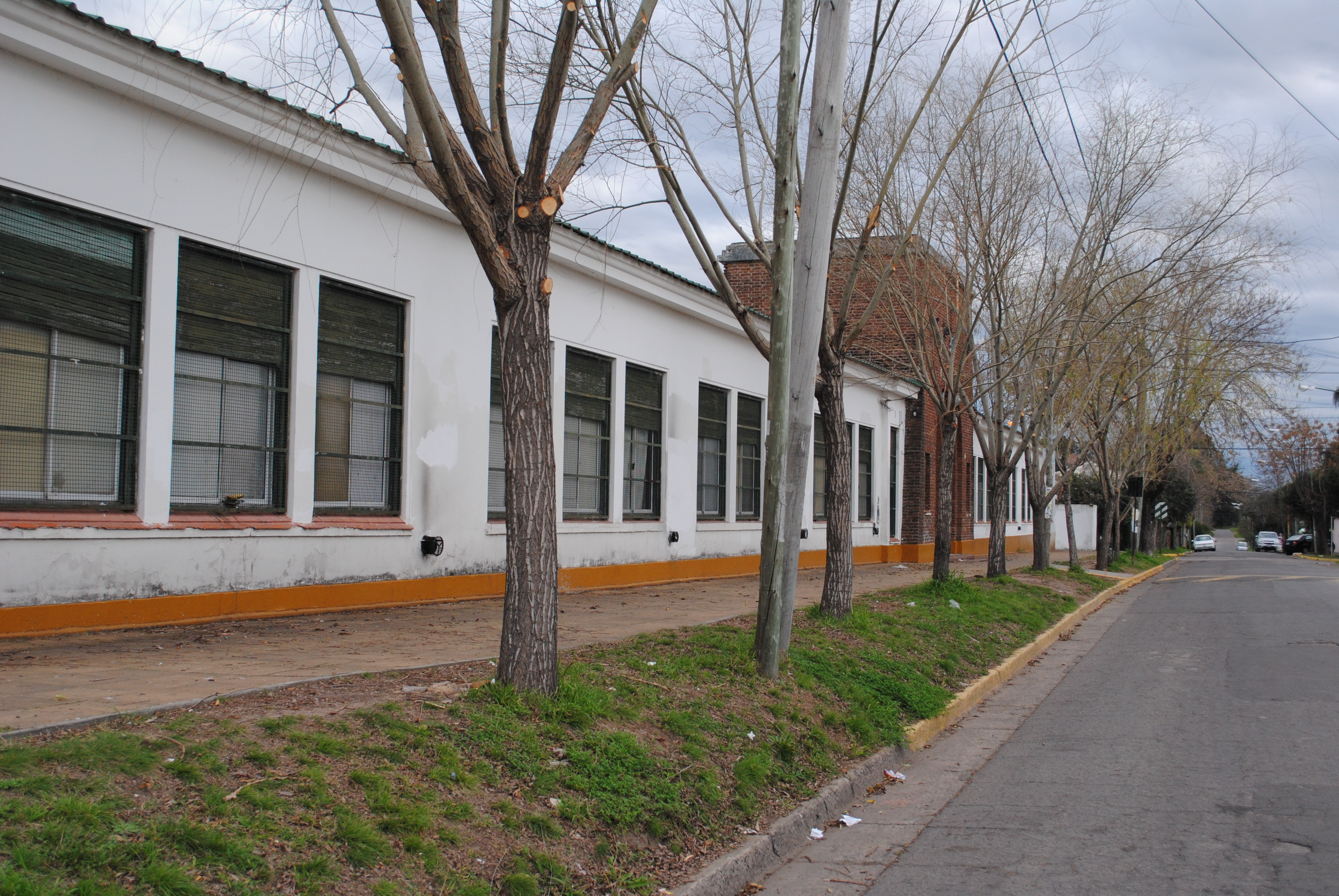
- School No. 15 Juan Bautista Alberdi

- Location in Greater Buenos Aires
- Coordinates: 34°28′19″S 58°39′18″W
- Country: Argentina
- Province: Buenos Aires
- Partido: Tigre
- First land subdivision: 1935

Government
  - Intendant: Julio Zamora (UP)
  - Municipal delegate: Eduardo González
- Elevation: 20 m (66 ft)

Population (2010 census [INDEC])
  - Total: 50,426
- CPA Base: B 1618
- Area code: +54 011

El Talar, also known as El Talar de Pacheco, is a city in Tigre Partido in Buenos Aires Province, Argentina. It forms part of the Greater Buenos Aires urban conurbation. El Talar is located 18 km (11 mi) from its nearest access point to the Autonomous City of Buenos Aires and 35 km (22 mi) northwest of downtown Buenos Aires.

== History ==
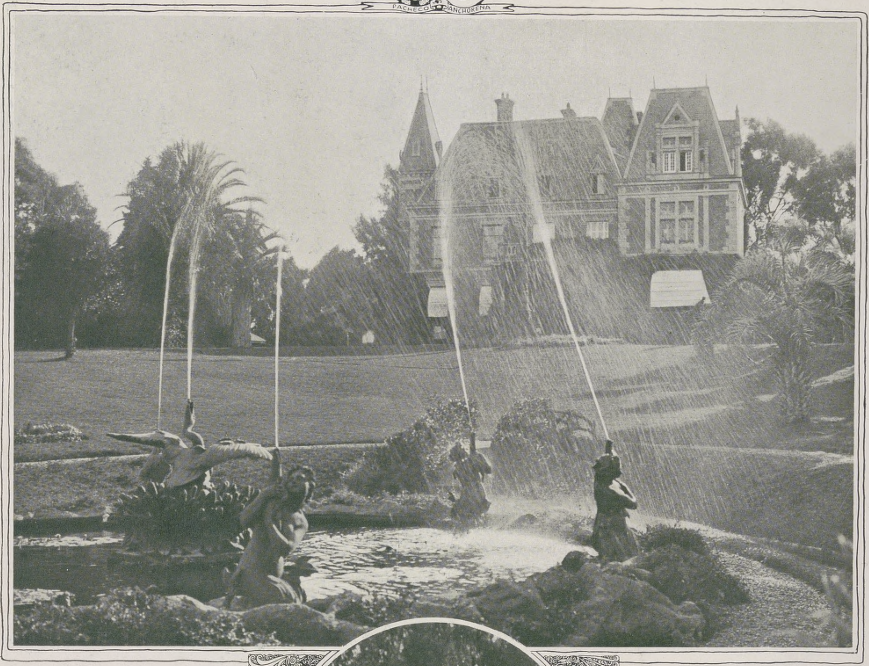
El Talar de Pacheco in 1917

In the 19th century, General Ángel Pacheco founded an estate in the area named El Talar. The name is derived from the groves of tala trees in the locality. The estate was thus referred to as El Talar de Pacheco.

In 1892, the Central Argentine Railway laid tracks for a branch line that crossed the estate. By the early 20th century, El Talar de Pacheco was leased to market gardeners and dairy farmers who loaded their products onto the railways passing through the area. From 1908, the railway's Stop km 35 was installed.

Around the 1920s, the entire area was referred to as General Pacheco, as this was the nearest urban center. During those years, the Aeroposta Argentina company established an airstrip. A small tramway connected the airstrip with Stop km 35. In 1931, National Route 197 was built, and the following year, buses from the La Independencia company, now Line 365, began operating.

In 1935, land subdivision began. The new development was named El Talar through a resolution of the Executive Branch of Buenos Aires Province on 20 July 1935. In 1937, Stop km 35 became El Talar railway station, and by then, the first houses and shops of the town were being built.

In the 1940s, the Sociedad de Fomento Unión El Talar was founded, along with the Club Social y Deportivo El Talar, and the current Line 720 began operating. The first doctor and pharmacist were established. School No. 15, which had operated in Pacheco since 1927, relocated to a house in El Talar until 1951, when its current building was constructed. A few years later, on subdivided land that belonged to Aeroposta, School No. 30 was created. In 1961, the Civil Registry of Pacheco moved to a location in El Talar. In 1962, the Technical Education School of El Talar began operating in the building of School No. 15.

In 1965, the Municipal Delegation of the locality was created. The current temple of the Medalla Milagrosa parish was then built, facing El Talar plaza, currently occupied by the Technical School. In 1968, Secondary Education School No. 1 was created, which also initially operated at night in the building of School 15, until the Technical School moved to its current building, leaving the previous one to Secondary 1. Several primary schools were established in the different neighborhoods that emerged in the locality.

By 1970, the population of El Talar exceeded that of General Pacheco. It was declared a city by Provincial Law 10,294, enacted and promulgated on 25 July 1985.

In 1993, a bridge was built over the tracks of the Mitre Railway (formerly Central Argentino), connecting the cities of General Pacheco and El Talar more quickly.

== Geography ==
=== Location ===
The city borders the localities of Pablo Nogués and Adolfo Sourdeaux in Malvinas Argentinas Partido, and Ricardo Rojas, Don Torcuato, and General Pacheco in Tigre Partido.

The locality is crossed by the Darragueira stream, which originates in Malvinas Argentinas and is a tributary of the Las Tunas stream.

=== Neighborhoods ===
- Almirante Brown
- Altos del Talar
- El Talar Norte
- El Talar Sur
- El Boyero
- El Perejil
- La Paloma
- Parque San Lorenzo
- San Francisco de Asís
- San Pablo
- 29 de Noviembre

== Economy ==
The construction of the Pan-American Highway transformed El Talar into an industrial center. Factories such as Ford, Terrabusi, Frigor, Armetal, Wobron, Corni, Fargo, and Piero established operations in the area, drawn by the highway's connectivity.

The city's proximity to the Pan-American Highway continues to drive economic activity. The Panamericana 29 industrial park hosts numerous companies and serves as a focal point for manufacturing in the locality. Local industries produce textiles, wicker goods, and leather products. Small-scale commerce includes neighborhood shops, local fairs, and markets that cater to residents and support entrepreneurship.

== Demographics ==
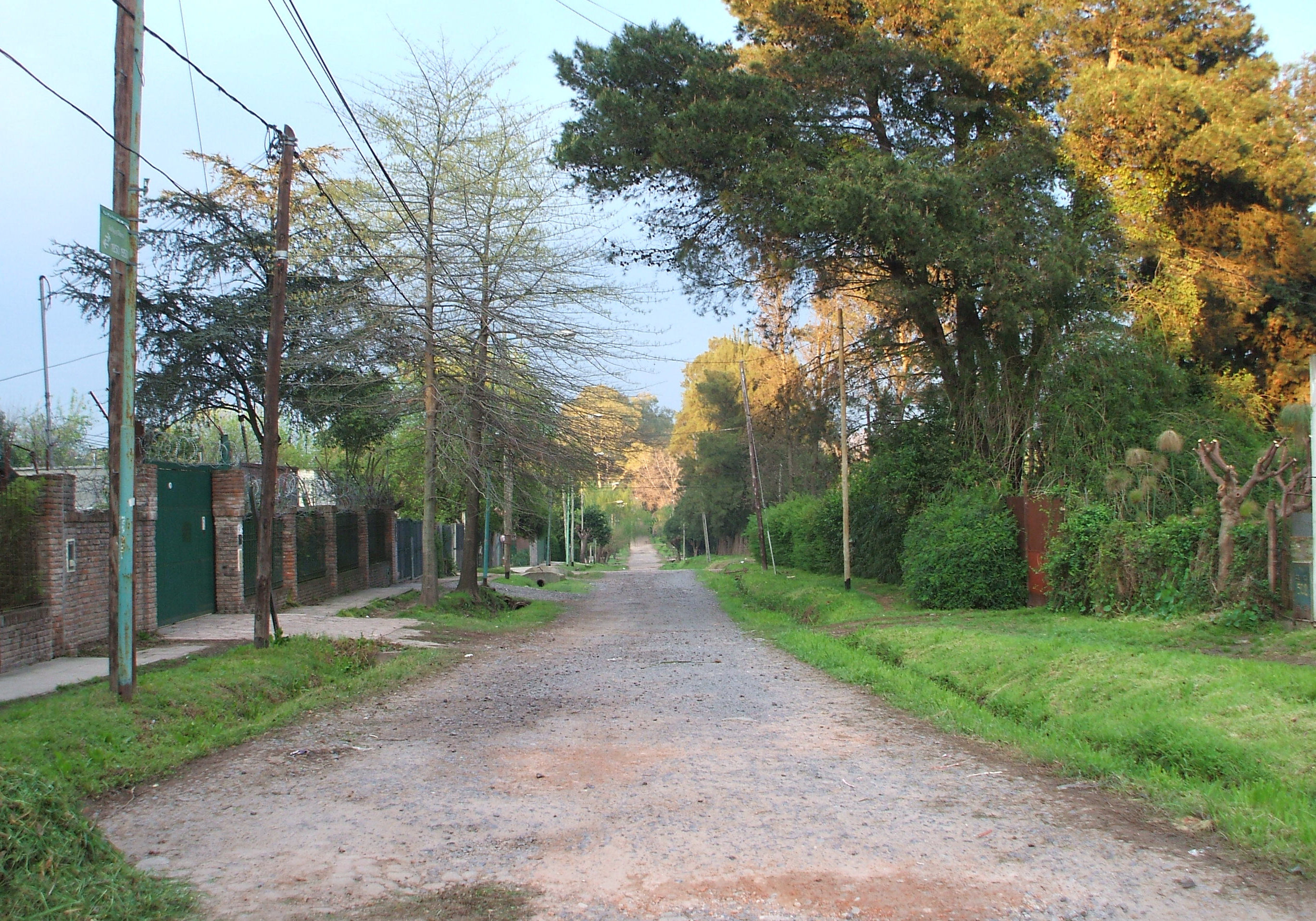
Gelly y Obes Street

According to the 2010 census [INDEC], the city had a population of 50,426, making it the fourth most populous locality in the partido. This represents an increase of 16.1% from the 43,420 registered in the 2001 census [INDEC].

== Transport ==
Provincial Route 24, named Hipólito Yrigoyen Avenue, and the Pan-American Highway at kilometer 30 pass through El Talar. The city is also served by El Talar railway station, which operates on the Victoria-Capilla del Señor service of the Mitre Line.

== Religion ==
The city belongs to the Roman Catholic Diocese of San Isidro. Its Catholic parishes are Espíritu Santo, Medalla Milagrosa, and Santa Clara de Asís.

In addition to the Catholic Church, there are multiple evangelical Christian congregations of various denominations present in the city.
