= Tigre Partido =

Tigre Partido Partido de Tigre
- Partido
- Municipio de Tigre
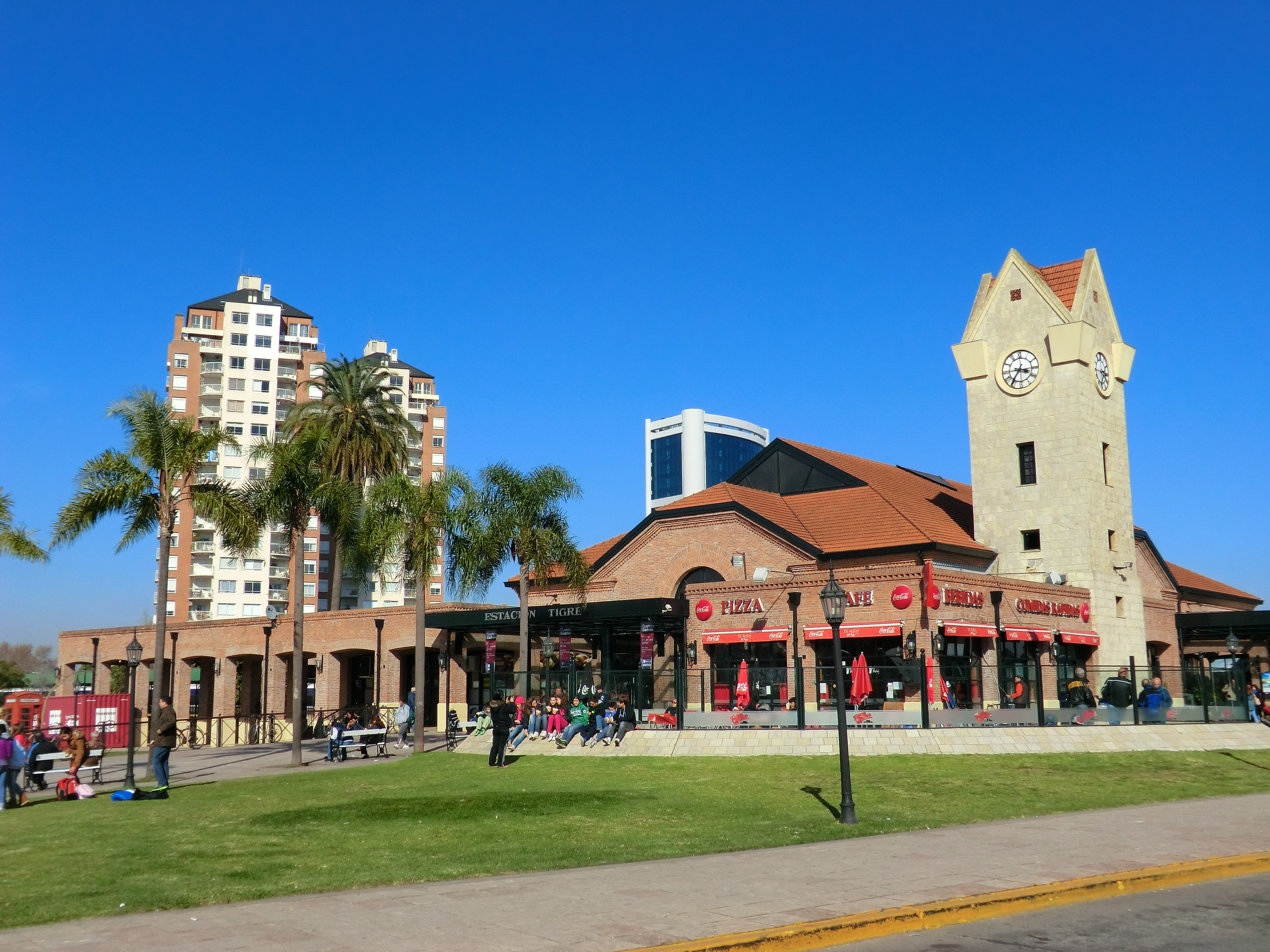
- Tigre railway station

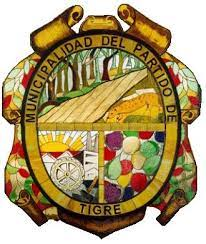
- Seal Municipal logo

- Location of Tigre Partido in Buenos Aires Province
- Coordinates: 34°25′22″S 58°34′51″W
- Country: Argentina
- Province: Buenos Aires
- Region: Greater Buenos Aires
- Established: 1785; 241 years ago
- Founded: 1790; 236 years ago
- Cabecera: Tigre

Government
  - Intendant: Julio Zamora (UP)

Area
  - Total: 368 km^{2} (142 sq mi)
  - Land: 148 km^{2} (57 sq mi)
  - Water: 220 km^{2} (85 sq mi)
- Elevation: 2 m (6.6 ft)

Population (2022 census [INDEC])
  - Total: 446,949
  - Rank: 12th in the province
  - Density: 1,214.53/km^{2} (3,145.6/sq mi)
  - Largest city: Don Torcuato: 64,867 (2,010 census)
- Demonym: Tigrense
- Time zone: UTC−3 (ART)
- CPA: B1608, B1610, B1611, B1617, B1618, B1621, B1623, B1624, B1648, B1649, B1670, B1671
- Area Code: 011, 0348, 03327
- HDI (2004): 0.835 (117th) – Very High
- Website: www.tigre.gob.ar

Tigre is one of the 135 partidos of the Buenos Aires province in Argentina. It is located in the northern area of the Greater Buenos Aires metropolitan region. This district encompasses a significant portion of the Paraná Delta and its low-lying islands, as well as a continental zone containing its administrative head, the city of Tigre, along with other localities such as Don Torcuato, General Pacheco, Benavídez, El Talar, Rincón de Milberg, and Nordelta.

The partido is bounded to the north by the Paraná de las Palmas River, which separates it from the San Fernando Partido; to the northeast by the Río de la Plata; to the southeast by San Fernando Partido and San Isidro Partido; to the south by San Martín Partido; to the southwest by San Miguel Partido and Malvinas Argentinas Partido; and to the west by Escobar Partido.

Its total area, including the islands, is 368 km^{2} (142 sq mi). As of the 2022 Census, the district had a population of 446,949 inhabitants.

Famous Argentine author Jorge Luis Borges described the area with the words: "no other city do I know that adjoins a secret group of green islands, which get lost at unknown waters of such a slow river that literature called it frozen..."

== History ==
=== Colonial Times ===
The history of Tigre dates back to the establishment of a port on the banks of the Las Conchas River, which gave origin to the Pueblo de las Conchas (Las Conchas Village/Town of the Shells). The river was named after the seashell debris that was abundant in the riverbed; its old course now runs along what is today Liniers Street, while the modern river is known as the Reconquista River.

Before European settlement, the islands were inhabited by indigenous groups, particularly the Guaraníes. These were nomadic hunters, gatherers, and firewood seekers who utilized the river network.

Following the second founding of Buenos Aires in 1580 by Juan de Garay, lands were distributed for ranches and farms. The port at Las Conchas became a strategic hub for ships sailing the Paraná River to or from Paraguay, as well as for those carrying timber, charcoal, and firewood from the Delta to Buenos Aires. Due to its strategic importance, the area was also a target for smugglers and occasional Portuguese, English, and Spanish incursions.

By 1780, a church had been built, and the parish was established. In 1785, the area was formally recognized as a partido. However, the settlement was prone to severe natural disasters. In early June 1805, Las Conchas village was almost devastated by a heavy rainstorm that made the river overflow its banks. Most of the population moved to higher nearby lands, where the village of San Fernando de la Buena Vista was founded, and a canal was built to serve as a new port.

=== 19th Century: Invasions and Geological Changes ===
The village of Las Conchas was deserted and almost completely abandoned after the 1805 floods, but it remained a key military point. On August 4, 1806, during the British invasions of the Río de la Plata, Captain Santiago de Liniers landed at the Las Conchas River to organize his troops before marching to retake Buenos Aires from British General William Carr Beresford. Liniers' troops camped at the Goycochea estate, and many local residents joined the Reconquista.

In August 1820, the village was destroyed once again, this time by a tornado. The rising floodwaters trapped the entrance to the port. Simultaneously, the outflow of water carved a wider bed through a small stream known as the "Tigre" (named after the jaguars or tigres seen in the area), turning it into a river. Consequently, the port was moved to its present location on the Luján River, and in time, the village adopted the name Tigre.

=== Promotion of the Delta ===
During the second half of the 19th century, the area became economically and socially more important, mainly due to Domingo Faustino Sarmiento, president of Argentina from 1868 to 1872. Sarmiento insisted on the favorable development possibilities of the islands and fought for the rights of settlers to own the land they were working on. His house on the island has been turned into a museum that lies on the bank of the river that bears his name.

The arrival of the railway line to San Fernando in 1863, reaching Tigre in 1865, improved communications with Buenos Aires. This facilitated the trade of Delta products—basically fresh fruit, cider, jams, and timber—and allowed for one-day visits by city dwellers. This favored the setting up of recreos (recreational areas) to spend the day on the islands and aroused interest in rowing along the quiet waters.

=== Island Dwellers and Social Life ===
From the moment Sarmiento encouraged development, the islands underwent a significant immigration process. New settlers came to live off the commercial exploitation of local products. Early construction materials included mudbrick (sun-dried bricks), rush, straw, and wood. The simple huts made from these materials were eventually followed by houses made entirely of wood, elevated on stilts to survive the rising tides.

Islanders developed a strong sense of identity. In 1933, Hungarian immigrant Sandor Mikler founded the Delta journal to share the common interests and troubles of the community. By that time, nearly 20,000 people lived on the islands, peaking at 40,000 in subsequent years. In 1936, local producers founded the "Consejo de Productores Isleños" (Island Producers Board) and established October 31 as "Islanders' Day".

Social activity was intense, with weekly meetings at numerous clubs. Religious services were adapted to the geography; a "floating church" was created to sail along the rivers to facilitate service, though it was discontinued towards 1952 due to high costs. A bell tower from this era remains at the Police Station in the Paraná de las Palmas and Carapachay rivers. A distinct tradition is the nautical procession celebrated every December 8 (Immaculate Conception Day), where a boat carrying the image of the Virgin Mary is followed by a parade of decorated commercial and private vessels.

=== Delta Economy ===
Historically, the early inhabitants lived mostly by hunting, fishing, and gathering small palm coconuts. In colonial times, the area supplied Buenos Aires with firewood and charcoal. Later, fruit growing prevailed until 1940, when a massive river rise spoiled most plants. The crisis provoked a mass departure of a large part of the population, and the emergence of new fruit markets in other regions of the country hindered the recovery of this traditional resource.

Other regional products include wicker baskets and furniture. The cultivation of osier, native to European and Asian cold regions, was proposed by Sarmiento because it resists floods. Another plant adapted to the wetlands is New Zealand flax, which was industrialized from 1925 for use in containers, burlap, cords, and mats. By the end of the 20th century, competition from synthetic fibers made it largely uneconomic.

Today, modern developments include apiculture, camellia and azalea nurseries, handicrafts, and timber production. The Puerto de Frutos in Tigre city remains the central hub where these products are sold to tourists and locals.

=== The Golden Years of Tigre ===
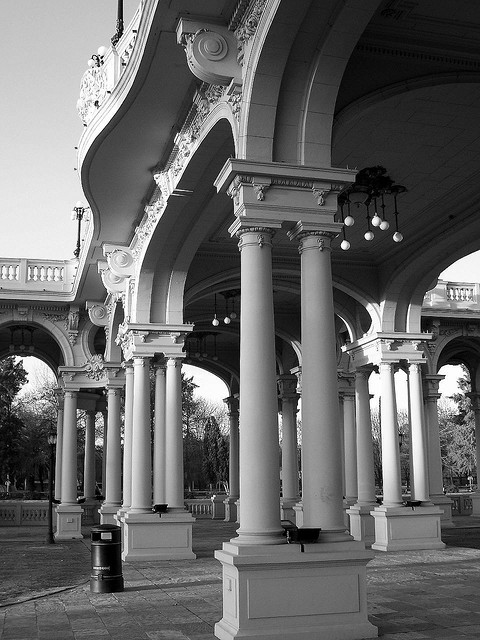
The Tigre Art Museum, formerly the Tigre Club, a symbol of the "Belle Époque".

Rowing was one of the main attractions that fueled the boom of the area in the late 19th and early 20th centuries. President Sarmiento was present at the first regatta organized on December 8, 1873. The event was so successful that existing rowing clubs moved to Tigre, and new ones were founded by members of various foreign communities (British, Italian, Swiss, Scandinavian) residing in Buenos Aires.

Yachting began to be practiced in 1883 with the founding of the "Yacht Club Argentino" (later moved to San Fernando) and the "Tigre Sailing Club".

The era, known as the "Golden Years", saw the construction of magnificent European-style buildings. The Tigre Hotel was opened in 1890 on the bank of the Luján River, and next to it, the Tigre Club was opened in 1912. These elegant buildings became meeting places for the social elite of the Belle Époque. The hotel was demolished in 1940, but the Tigre Club stands today, restored as the Museo de Arte Tigre (MAT) and declared a National Historic Monument.

In 1952, the name of the district was officially changed from Partido de las Conchas to Partido de Tigre.

== Environmental issues ==
The Tigre district is situated at the mouth of the Reconquista River basin, which, along with the Matanza-Riachuelo, is one of the most polluted in Argentina. The Tigre River and the Aliviador canal carry high levels of industrial and domestic waste, posing long-standing health risks to residents.

Urbanization has intensified these challenges. The 1990s saw a massive real estate boom with the construction of large gated communities (barrios privados) such as Nordelta, Santa Bárbara, and Villanueva. These developments, often built on raised land, have altered natural drainage patterns.

Infrastructure historically lagged behind this rapid growth. According to UNICEF census data, in 2010 approximately 83% of the district's population lacked access to sewer systems. In 2015, the Municipality signed a historic agreement with the national water company AySA to extend potable water and sewage networks to the entire territory, with major works aiming to close this gap in subsequent years.

== Geography ==
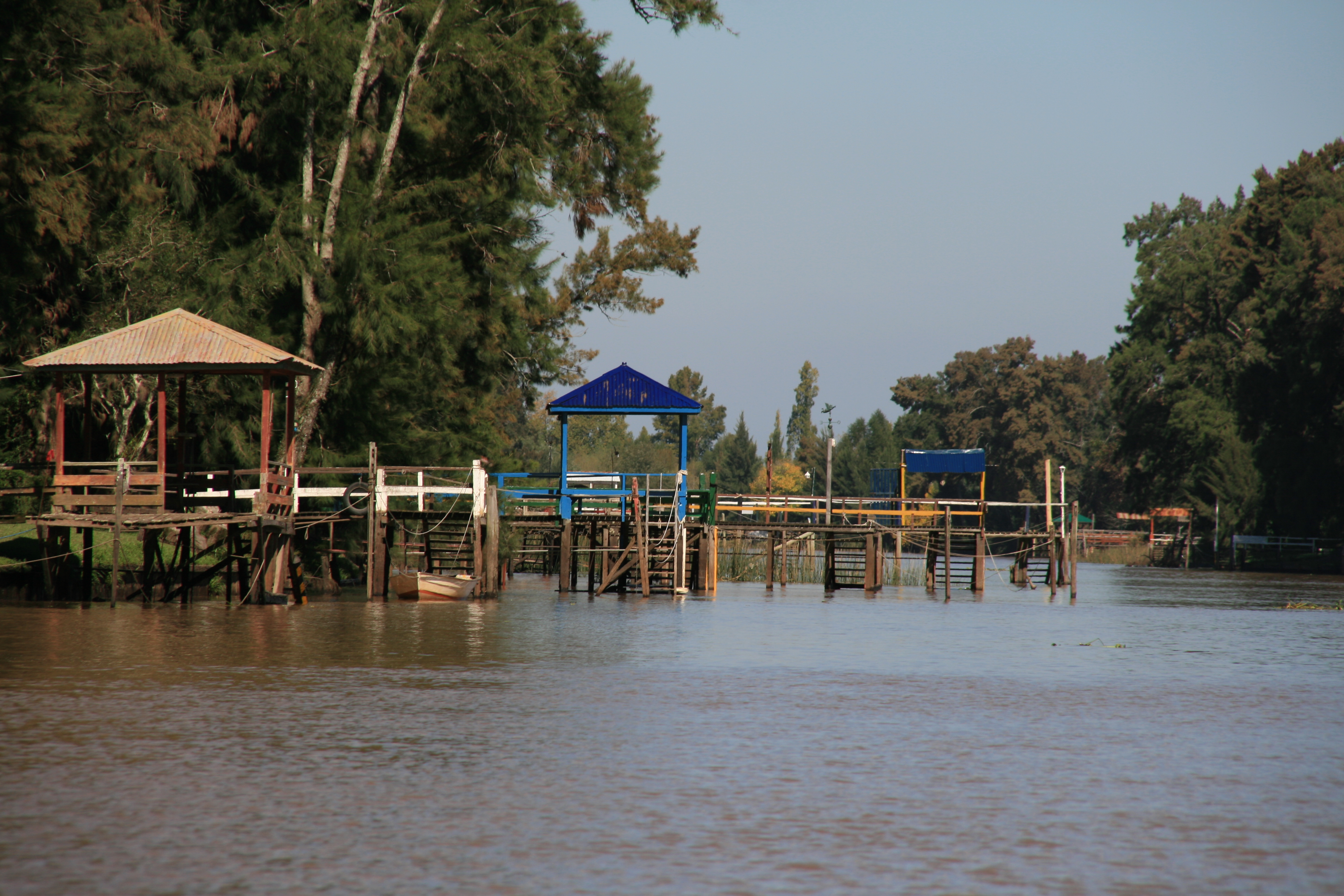
Moorings on the Paraná Delta, a key geographical feature of the district.

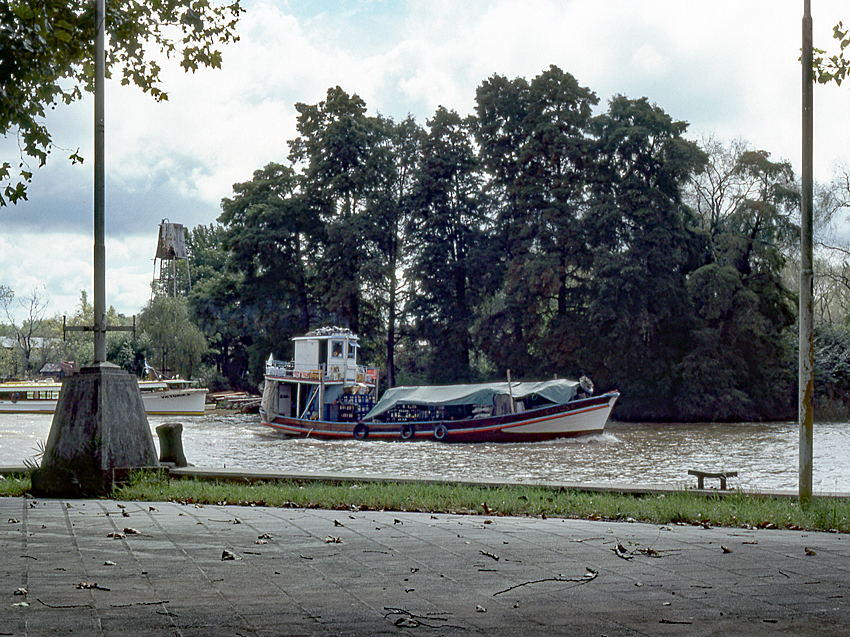
A supply boat ("supermercado flotante") navigating the Delta channels, essential for island logistics.

Tigre Partido is located in the northern zone of the Greater Buenos Aires agglomeration, approximately 31 km (19 mi) northwest of the federal capital, Buenos Aires. The district covers a total area of 368 km^{2} (142 sq mi), divided into two distinct geographical areas:

- Continental Sector: Occupies 148 km^{2} (57 sq mi) and comprises the densely populated urban settlements, including the administrative seat, Tigre.
- Insular Sector: Occupies 220 km^{2} (85 sq mi) and comprises the first section of the Paraná Delta. This area consists of low-lying islands prone to flooding, separated by a complex network of rivers and streams.

The district is bounded by the Paraná River to the north, separating it from San Fernando Partido; the Río de la Plata to the east; the partidos of San Fernando, San Isidro, and San Martín to the southeast; San Miguel and Malvinas Argentinas to the southwest; and Escobar to the northwest.

=== Seismicity ===
The region lies within the "Paraná River sub-fault" and the "Río de la Plata sub-fault" zones. While the area is generally considered to have low seismic activity, it is not risk-free. The last significant seismic event was the 1888 Río de la Plata earthquake, which occurred on 5 June 1888 at 3:20 UTC-3, with an estimated magnitude of 5.0 on the Richter scale.

== Localities ==
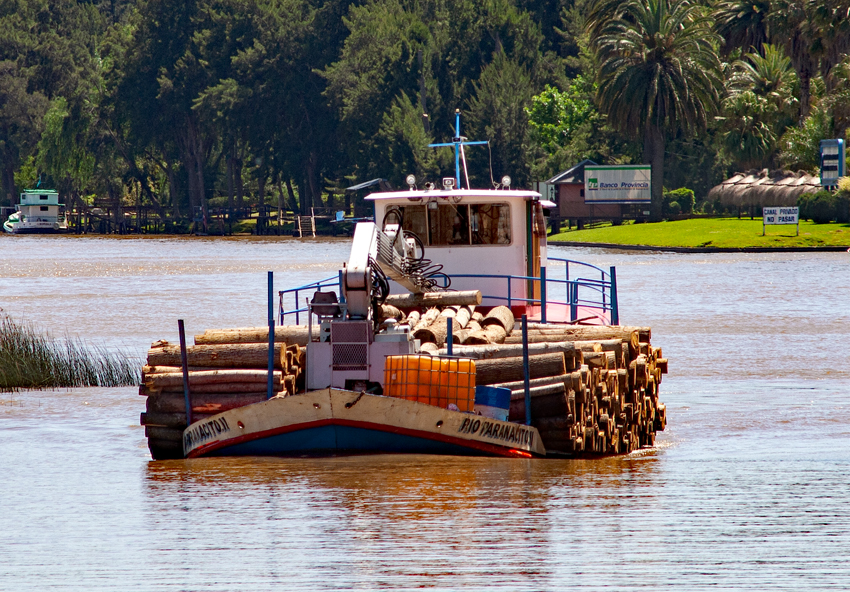
Timber boat descending the Luján River, connecting the localities of the Delta with the mainland.

The partido is divided into several administrative units or localities (localidades). While Tigre serves as the government seat, other localities like Don Torcuato and General Pacheco are significant population centers.

Localities of Tigre Partido
Name	Postal Code (CPA)	Notes
Tigre	B1648	Administrative seat (cabecera).
Don Torcuato	B1611	Major residential and industrial hub.
General Pacheco	B1617	Historically associated with the cattle industry; home to the Pacheco University.
El Talar	B1618	Densely populated urban area.
Troncos del Talar	B1608	Residential neighborhood adjacent to Tigre city.
Benavídez	B1621	Known for its semi-rural estates and sports clubs like Club Newman.
Dique Luján	B1622	Located near the canal built to prevent flooding; gateway to the Delta.
Ricardo Rojas	B1610	Smaller locality situated between El Talar and Benavídez.
Rincón de Milberg	B1624	Originally extensive lowlands, now heavily developed with gated communities.
Nordelta	B1670	A massive master-planned gated community (ciudad pueblo) established in the 1990s, recognized as a census locality in recent years.
Delta Islands	Various	The insular territory is administratively organized into sections (e.g., Primera Sección).

== Demographics ==
According to the definitive results of the 2022 Census, the population of Tigre Partido reached 446,949 inhabitants. This represents a significant growth of 18.7% compared to the 376,381 inhabitants recorded in the 2010 Census.

The district has experienced explosive demographic growth over the last century, transforming from a small riverside community into a densely populated suburban hub within the Greater Buenos Aires region.

Population evolution of Tigre Partido according to national censuses and inter-census variation percentage
Census	1869	1881	1895	1914	1947	1960	1970	1980	1991	2001	2010	2022
Population	3,329	4,715	8,978	16,691	58,348	91,725	152,335	206,349	257,922	301,223	376,381	446,949
Variation	—	▲41.63%	▲90.41%	▲85.91%	▲249.57%	▲57.20%	▲66.07%	▲35.45%	▲24.99%	▲16.78%	▲24.95%	▲18.7%

Source: National Institute of Statistics and Censuses (INDEC).

== Sports ==
Club de Regatas La Marina, one of the many historic rowing clubs in the district.

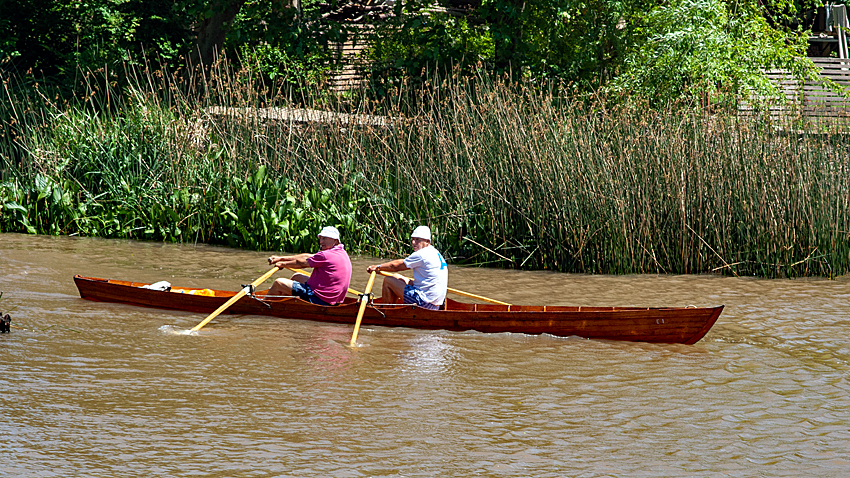
Rowing on the Luján River is a hallmark of Tigre's identity.

Tigre is often considered the national capital of rowing in Argentina. The district has a prestigious sporting tradition, particularly in water sports practiced along the Luján River and the Delta channels.

=== Rowing ===
The development of rowing in the area dates back to the late 19th century, driven by British immigrants and later adopted by other communities. On 16 December 1873, the Buenos Aires Rowing Club was founded, marking the beginning of organized water sports in the region.

Today, there are fifteen major rowing and yacht clubs concentrated in the city of Tigre, many of which are housed in buildings of significant architectural heritage. These clubs were founded by diverse immigrant communities, reflecting the cosmopolitan history of the area:

- Buenos Aires Rowing Club (1873)
- Club de Regatas La Marina (1876)
- Tigre Boat Club (1888)
- Club de Remeros Escandinavos (1895)
- Club de Regatas Hispano-Argentino (1913)
- Club Suizo de Buenos Aires (1913)
- Nahuel Rowing Club (1916)

These institutions have produced numerous athletes who have competed internationally, representing Argentina in the Olympic Games and Pan American Games.

=== Football ===
The most prominent football club associated with the district is Club Atlético Tigre (nicknamed El Matador). Although it was founded in the city of Tigre in 1902, its stadium, the Estadio José Dellagiovanna, is currently located in the Victoria neighborhood of the adjacent San Fernando Partido.

Locally, Benavídez FC competes in regional leagues such as the Liga Escobarense. The club is also known for its social work, including programs to assist youths with addiction issues.

=== Rugby Union ===
The district is a stronghold for rugby union in the Buenos Aires region, hosting several top-tier clubs that compete in the URBA (Unión de Rugby de Buenos Aires) tournaments:

- Hindú Club: Located in Don Torcuato, it is one of the most successful rugby clubs in Argentine history.
- Club Newman: A prestigious club located in Benavídez.
- Tigre Rugby Club: The local club representing the city.
- Delta Rugby Club: Also based in the district, with facilities inaugurated in recent years.

== Politics ==
=== Government ===
The local government of Tigre is composed of two branches: the Executive Branch, headed by a directly elected Intendant (mayor), and the Legislative Branch, represented by the Deliberative Council (Concejo Deliberante). The intendant is elected for a four-year term and can be re-elected indefinitely.

The current Intendant is Julio César Zamora, who has been in office since 2013.

=== Municipal Intendants since 1983 ===
Since the return of democracy in 1983, the office has been held by the following individuals:

List of Intendants of Tigre (1983–Present)
Intendant	Term	Party	Alliance	Election
Oscar Egidio Giordano	10 December 1983 – 10 December 1987	UCR	—	1983
Ricardo José Ubieto	10 December 1987 – 10 December 1991	AC	Vecinalismo (Neighborhood Party)	1987
Ricardo José Ubieto	10 December 1991 – 10 December 1995	AC	Vecinalismo (Neighborhood Party)	1991
Ricardo José Ubieto	10 December 1995 – 10 December 1999	AC	Vecinalismo (Neighborhood Party)	1995
Ricardo José Ubieto	10 December 1999 – 10 December 2003	AC	Vecinalismo (Neighborhood Party)	1999
Ricardo José Ubieto	10 December 2003 – 16 November 2006 (Note: Died in office.)	AC	Vecinalismo (Neighborhood Party)	2003
Hiram Gualdoni	16 November 2006 – 10 December 2007	AC	Vecinalismo (Neighborhood Party)	2003
Sergio Tomás Massa	10 December 2007 – 23 July 2008 (Note: Resigned to assume office as Chief of the Cabinet of Ministers.)	PJ	FPV	2007
Julio Zamora	23 July 2008 – 24 July 2009	PJ	FPV	2007
Sergio Tomás Massa	24 July 2009 (Note: Resumed office after resigning as Chief of the Cabinet of Ministers.) – 10 December 2011	PJ	FPV	2007
Sergio Tomás Massa	10 December 2011 – 25 November 2013 (Note: Resigned to assume office as a National Deputy.)	PJ	FPV	2011
Sergio Tomás Massa	10 December 2011 – 25 November 2013	FR (Note: Founded by Massa on 24 June 2013.)	—	2011
Julio Zamora	25 November 2013 – 10 December 2015	FR	—	2011
Julio Zamora	10 December 2015 – 10 December 2019	FR	UNA	2015
Julio Zamora	10 December 2019 – 10 December 2023	UT	FdT	2019
Julio Zamora	10 December 2023 – Incumbent	UT	UP	2023

=== Deliberative Council ===
The Honorable Deliberative Council (HCD) is the legislative body of the municipality, composed of 24 councilors. Its current composition for the 2023–2025 period, presided over by Miguel Escalante, is as follows:

Composition of the Deliberative Council (2023–2025)
Political Coalition	Seats	Status
Unión por la Patria	12	Majority (Officialism)
Juntos por el Cambio	9	Opposition
La Libertad Avanza	3	Opposition
Total	24	

=== Municipal elections ===
==== Elections in the 2020s ====
Municipal Election Results (2020–2029)
2023 Tigre Partido Municipal Election Sunday 22 October 2023
Mayoral Candidate	Party / Alliance	Votes	%	Councilors	School C.	Elected Officials
Julio Zamora (UpT)	Unión por la Patria View alliance parties: Justicialist Party; Intransigent Party; Communist Party; Broad Front; Victory Party; Solidary Party; Kolina; Electoral Instrument for Popular Unity; Meeting for Democracy and Equity; Party of Labour and the People; Culture, Education and Labour Party; Federal Commitment; Project South; Bonaerense Christian Popular Party; Memory and Social Mobilization; Federal Integration Movement; New Buenos Aires Party; Social Pole; Bonaerense Thought Current; Authentic Renewal Front; Green Party; Authentic Communist Party; Equity, Justice and Organization Party; New Leadership; Buenos Aires Province Party; Popular Left Party; Action for Tigre's Growth; United for Tigre Grouping; Neighborhood Force for Social Change	120,226	50.31%	6/12	3/5	Councilors: Cecilia Alejandra Pereyra; Miguel Ángel Escalante; Adriana Patricia Paludi; Federico Miguel Stachowiak; Mónica Marilina Silva; Lucas Geronimo Gianella; School Councilors: Adrián Darío Pintos; Clara Reina Antunez; Ramón Emilio Moreno
Pedro "Segundo" Cernadas (PRO)	Juntos por el Cambio View alliance parties: Integration and Development Movement; Radical Civic Union; Democratic Progressive Party; UNIR; Civic Coalition ARI; Republican Proposal; Faith Party; Autonomist Party; Democratic Party; Open Space for Development; Federal Proposal for Change; Social Movement for the Republic; Integrar Party; Dialogue Party; Acción Comunal del Partido de Tigre	57,957	24.25%	3/12	1/5	Councilors: Mariano José Pelayo; Sofía Enoe Bravo Adamoli; Marcelo Fabián Barrios; School Councilors: Andrea Martins
Claudio Baumgarten (PL)	La Libertad Avanza View alliance parties: Libertarian Party; Democratic Party; Faith Party; Federal Renovator Party; Union of the Centre (UCeDe)	51,802	21.98%	3/12	1/4	Councilors: Juan José Cervetto; Adriana La Magna; Diego Avancini; School Councilors: Claudia Patricia Escudero
Paula Akerfeld (PO)	FIT-U View alliance parties: Left for a Socialist Option; Socialist Workers' Movement; Socialist Workers' Party; Workers' Party	8,979	3.76%	0/12	0/4	—
Positive votes		199,204	93.17%			
Blank ballots		12,830	6.00%			
Invalid ballots		11,461	0.68%			
Turnout		236,164	81.42%			
Registered voters		316,145	100%			
Source: Junta Electoral de la Provincia de Buenos Aires
2021 Tigre Partido Legislative Election Sunday 14 November 2021
Mayoral Candidate	Party / Alliance	Votes	%	Councilors	School C.	Elected Officials
Midterm Election (No Executive)	Juntos View alliance parties: MID; UCR; Christian Democratic Party; Democratic Progressive Party; Federal Popular Union; National Constitutional Party; Civic Coalition ARI; Socialist Party; PRO; Generation for a National Encounter; Federal Renovator Party; Open Space; Loyalty and Dignity; Federal Proposal; Dialogue Party; Social Movement; Integrar; Public Trust	89,749	39.59%	7/12	3/5	Councilors: Segundo Cernadas; María Marcela Cesare; Adolfo Leber; Ximena Pereyra; Nicolás Massot; Josefina Ponde; Lisandro Lanzón; School Councilors: Ana Laura Visca; Mariano José Visoso; Mayra Anahí Godoy
Midterm Election (No Executive)	Frente de Todos View alliance parties: Justicialist Party; Intransigent Party; Communist Party; Broad Front; Victory Party; Solidary Party; Kolina; Popular Unity; New Encounter; PTP; CET; Faith Party; Federal Commitment; Project South; Renewal Front; Open Politics for Social Integrity|; New Buenos Aires; Patria Grande; Action for Tigre; United for Tigre	86,336	38.09%	5/12	2/5	Councilors: Gisela Lucía R. Hortazo de Zamora; Francisco "Toto" Fernández Miranda; Sandra Beatriz Rossi; Ramón Alejandro Ríos; Mariana Victoria Etchart; School Councilors: Lucas Gabriel Lezcano; Rosana Noemí Pérez
Midterm Election (No Executive)	Avanza Libertad	17,773	7.84%	0/12	0/5	—
Midterm Election (No Executive)	FIT-U	16,616	7.33%	0/12	0/5	—
Midterm Election (No Executive)	Vamos con Vos View alliance parties: Libres del Sur; Third Position Party; H.A.C.E.R. Front; Acción Comunal del Partido de Tigre	8,698	3.84%	0/12	0/5	—
Midterm Election (No Executive)	Unión Celeste y Blanco (+Valores)	7,496	3.31%	0/12	0/5	—
Positive votes		226,668	96.42%			
Blank ballots		5,454	2.32%			
Invalid ballots		2,959	1.26%			
Turnout		235,081	69.79%			
Registered voters		336,803	100%			
Source: Junta Electoral de la Provincia de Buenos Aires

==== Elections in the 2010s ====
Municipal Election Results (2010–2019)
2019 Tigre Partido Municipal Election Sunday 27 October 2019
Mayoral Candidate	Party / Alliance	Votes	%	Councilors	School C.	Elected Officials
Julio Zamora (UpT)	Frente de Todos View alliance parties: Justicialist Party; Renewal Front; Kolina; Victory Party; New Encounter; Project South; Communist Party; Intransigent Party; Solidary Party; Broad Front; Popular Unity; FORJA Concertation Party	135,293	55.48%	7/12	3/5	Councilors: Micaela Ferraro; Rodrigo Juan Molinos; Mayra Lorena Mariani; Fernando Daniel Mantelli; María Florencia Mosqueda; Damián Rodrigo Álvarez; Mirta Verónica Caamaño; School Councilors: María Gloria Zingoni; Adrián Darío Pintos; María Fernanda Correa
Pedro "Segundo" Cernadas (PRO)	Juntos por el Cambio View alliance parties: PRO; UCR; Civic Coalition ARI; PDP; MID; Faith Party; Democratic Party; Acción Comunal	84,680	34.72%	5/12	2/5	Councilors: Mariano José Pelayo; Sofía Enoe Bravo Adamoli; Maximiliano Carlos Picco; Ana María Ramos Fernandes Costa; Juan María Furnari; School Councilors: Alberto Camilo Piccone Sánchez; Andrea Martins
Juan Manuel Laborde Rodríguez	Consenso Federal	11,566	4.74%	0/12	0/5	—
Paula Akerfeld	FIT-U	8,188	3.36%	0/12	0/5	—
Adrián Zolezzi	Frente NOS	4,144	1.70%	0/12	0/5	—
Positive votes		243,871	94.00%			
Blank ballots		13,643	5.26%			
Invalid ballots		1,924	0.74%			
Turnout		259,438	80.41%			
Registered voters		322,608	100%			
Source: Junta Electoral de la Provincia de Buenos Aires
2017 Tigre Partido Legislative Election Sunday 22 October 2017
Mayoral Candidate	Party / Alliance	Votes	%	Councilors	School C.	Elected Officials
Midterm Election (No Executive)	Cambiemos View alliance parties: PRO; UCR; Civic Coalition ARI; UCeDe; Faith Party; Acción Comunal	80,748	35.19%	4/12	2/5	Councilors: Pedro "Segundo" Cernadas; Carla Eleonora Kammann; Matías Casaretto; Camila Benedit; School Councilors: Mariano José Visoso; Andrea Martins
Midterm Election (No Executive)	1País View alliance parties: Renewal Front; Generation for a National Encounter; Libres del Sur; MID	65,890	28.71%	4/12	2/5	Councilors: Gisela Zamora; Carlos Daniel Gambino; María Alejandra Nardi; Luis Emilio Samyn Ducó; School Councilors: Damián Rodrigo Álvarez; Rosana Noemí Pérez
Midterm Election (No Executive)	Unidad Ciudadana View alliance parties: Broad Front; Victory Party; Kolina; Solidary Party; New Encounter	62,252	27.13%	4/12	1/5	Councilors: Roxana Alejandra López; Lucas Gerónimo Gianella; Gladys Mirta Pollan; Cristian Javier Forlenza; School Councilors: Marta Graciela Meza
Midterm Election (No Executive)	FIT	12,385	5.40%	0/12	0/5	—
Midterm Election (No Executive)	Frente Justicialista Cumplir	8,192	3.57%	0/12	0/5	—
Positive votes		229,467	94.64%			
Blank ballots		11,020	4.54%			
Invalid ballots		1,987	0.82%			
Turnout		242,474	77.85%			
Registered voters		311,453	100%			
Source: Junta Electoral de la Provincia de Buenos Aires
2015 Tigre Partido Municipal Election Sunday 25 October 2015
Mayoral Candidate	Party / Alliance	Votes	%	Councilors	School C.	Elected Officials
Julio Zamora (FR)	UNA	96,839	44.09%	6/12	3/6	Councilors: Malena Galmarini De Massa; Rodrigo Juan Molinos; José María Paesani; Sonia Margarita Gatarri; Fernando Daniel Mantelli; Daniel Osvaldo Macri; School Councilors: Adrián Darío Pintos; Adriana Eugenia Frega; Fabiana Melina Ávalos
Sergio Bartolomé Szpolski	Frente para la Victoria	56,874	25.90%	3/12	2/6	Councilors: Martín Gerónimo Gianella; Sergio Ramón Romano; María Florencia Mosqueda; School Councilors: Juan Manuel Reboredo Rodríguez; Martín Daniel López
Ernesto Casaretto (AC)	Cambiemos View alliance parties: Acción Comunal; PRO; UCR; Civic Coalition ARI; Faith Party	50,438	22.96%	3/12	1/6	Councilors: Guillermo Ricardo Edward; Pedro "Segundo" Cernadas; Ana María Ramos Fernandes Costa; School Councilors: Alberto Camilo Piccone Sánchez
Gabriela Macauda	FIT	10,116	4.61%	0/12	0/6	—
Romina Paola Capomasi	Progresistas	5,364	2.44%	0/12	0/6	—
Positive votes		219,631	90.85%			
Blank ballots		20,555	8.50%			
Invalid ballots		1,555	0.64%			
Turnout		241,741	82.38%			
Registered voters		293,441	100%			
Source: Junta Electoral de la Provincia de Buenos Aires
2013 Tigre Partido Legislative Election Sunday 27 October 2013
Mayoral Candidate	Party / Alliance	Votes	%	Councilors	School C.	Elected Officials
Midterm Election (No Executive)	Renewal Front	127,360	61.82%	9/12	4/4	Councilors: Carlos Daniel Gambino; María Alejandra Nardi; Carlos Diego Santillán; José María Paesani; Teresa Vilma Paunovich; Carlos Eugenio Samyn Ducó; Carlos Alberto Figueroa; Sandra Beatriz Rossi; Alejandro Raúl Forlong; School Councilors: Raúl Osvaldo Mansilla; Viviana Andrea Flores; Marta Graciela Meza; Marcelo Ricardo Agusti
Midterm Election (No Executive)	Frente para la Victoria	38,316	18.60%	3/12	0/4	Councilors: Federico Ugo; Gustavo Rafael Enrique Piantino; Roxana Alejandra López
Midterm Election (No Executive)	Acción Comunal	14,085	6.84%	0/12	0/4	—
Midterm Election (No Executive)	Civic and Social Progressive Front	10,352	5.03%	0/12	0/4	—
Midterm Election (No Executive)	FIT	9,465	4.59%	0/12	0/4	—
Positive votes		206,007	94.14%			
Blank ballots		11,337	5.18%			
Invalid ballots		1,494	0.68%			
Turnout		218,838	81.74%			
Registered voters		267,710	100%			
Source: Junta Electoral de la Provincia de Buenos Aires
2011 Tigre Partido Municipal Election Sunday 23 October 2011
Mayoral Candidate	Party / Alliance	Votes	%	Councilors	School C.	Elected Officials
Sergio Massa (PJ)	Frente para la Victoria View alliance parties: Justicialist Party; Kolina; Communist Party; Popular Conservative; Victory Party; New Encounter; Broad Front; Humanist Party; Intransigent Party	130,810	73.14%	12/12	4/4	Councilors: Julio Zamora; Rodrigo Juan Molinos; Sonia Margarita Gatarri; Oscar Ramón Zacca; Daniel Osvaldo Macri; Blanca Beatriz Ledesma; Jorge Carlos Watson; Juan Baldo; Celia Nélida Geromel; Marcelo Alfredo Marina; José Daniel Núñez; Marta Ángela Sendra; School Councilors: Luis Andrés Amores; Rosa Magdalena Gioja; Luis Emilio Samyn Ducó; Hinginia Jesús González
Hugo Guillermo Leber	Acción Comunal	10,645	5.95%	0/12	0/4	—
Ariel Darío Arnedo	Union for Social Development (UCR)	9,371	5.24%	0/12	0/4	—
Martín Nunziata	FAP	7,518	4.20%	0/12	0/4	—
Positive votes		178,842	88.72%			
Blank ballots		21,536	10.68%			
Invalid ballots		1,213	0.60%			
Turnout		201,591	81.94%			
Registered voters		246,008	100%			
Source: Junta Electoral de la Provincia de Buenos Aires

==== Elections in the 2000s ====
Municipal Election Results (2001–2009)
2009 Tigre Partido Legislative Election Sunday 28 June 2009
Mayoral Candidate	Party / Alliance	Votes	%	Councilors	School C.	Elected Officials
Midterm Election (No Executive)	Frente para la Victoria View alliance parties: Justicialist Party; Acción para Crecer de Tigre; Social Progress Party	86,329	53.21%	7/12	3/4	Councilors: Malena Galmarini; Carlos Daniel Gambino; María Alejandra Nardi; Adrián Eduardo Gastaldi; Carlos Eugenio Samyn Ducó; Ana María Grandi; Walter Ramón Ríos; School Councilors: Raúl Osvaldo Mansilla; María Gloria Zingoni; Marcelo Ricardo Agusti
Midterm Election (No Executive)	Acción Comunal + Civic and Social Agreement View alliance parties: Acción Comunal del Partido de Tigre; UCR; Socialist Party; ARI; Democratic Progressive Party; Generation for a National Encounter; Open Politics for Social Integrity; Encuentro Popular; Integración y Movilidad Social; Movimiento Vecinalista Provincial	42,477	26.18%	3/12	1/4	Councilors: Hugo Guillermo Leber; Luis Alberto Cancelo; Ana María Ramos Fernandes Costa; School Councilors: Viviana María Roes
Midterm Election (No Executive)	Unión PRO View alliance parties: Federal Party; MID; PRO; RECREAR; Light Blue and White Union; UCeDé; Partido Nuevo Buenos Aires; Partido Popular Cristiano Bonaerense	26,262	16.19%	2/12	0/4	Councilors: Guillermo Diego García de la Vega; Ariel Darío Arnedo
Midterm Election (No Executive)	Nuevo Encuentro View alliance parties: Encounter for Democracy and Equity; Communist Party; Electoral Instrument for Popular Unity; Free of the South Movement; Solidarity and Equality; Partido de la Revolución Democrática	2,078	1.28%	0/12	0/4	—
Midterm Election (No Executive)	Workers' Left Front View alliance parties: MAS; PTS; IS	1,904	1.17%	0/12	0/4	—
Midterm Election (No Executive)	Política Obrera	807	0.50%	0/12	0/4	—
Midterm Election (No Executive)	MIJyD	691	0.43%	0/12	0/4	—
Midterm Election (No Executive)	Nueva Unión Ciudadana	579	0.36%	0/12	0/4	—
Midterm Election (No Executive)	Partido Vecinalista de Integración Ciudadana	578	0.36%	0/12	0/4	—
Midterm Election (No Executive)	Frente Es Posible View alliance parties: Es Posible Party; UNIR; Democratic Conservative Party	425	0.26%	0/12	0/4	—
Midterm Election (No Executive)	Consenso Federal	117	0.07%	0/12	0/4	—
Positive votes		162,247	92.93%			
Blank ballots		9,814	5.62%			
Invalid ballots		2,526	1.45%			
Turnout		174,587	77.42%			
Registered voters		225,493	100%			
Source: Junta Electoral de la Provincia de Buenos Aires
2007 Tigre Partido Municipal Election Sunday 28 October 2007
Mayoral Candidate	Party / Alliance	Votes	%	Councilors	School C.	Elected Officials
Sergio Massa (PJ)	Front for Victory + Acción Comunal View alliance parties: Front for Victory; Justicialist Party; Conservative People's Party; Victory Party; Christian Democratic Party; Broad Front; Intransigent Party; Free of the South Movement; Social Progress Party; Socialist Party; Integración y Movilidad Social; Memoria y Movilización Social; Movimiento H.A.C.E.R. por Buenos Aires; Polo Social; Acción para Crecer de Tigre	72,099	46.46%	6/12	2/4	Councilors: Julio César Zamora; Carlos Daniel Gambino; Marta Ángela Sendra De Vega; Juan Baldo; Juan Carlos Riquelme Escobar; Blanca Beatriz Ledesma; School Councilors: Raúl Osvaldo Mansilla; Luis Andrés Amores
Ernesto Guillermo Casaretto	Acción Comunal del Partido de Tigre	65,201	42.02%	6/12	2/4	Councilors: Ricardo A. Fabris; Jorge Carlos Watson; Celia Nélida Geromel; Sabrina Rebeca Torres; Daniel Osvaldo Macri; Rosa María González; School Councilors: María C. Chama; Amílcar Enrique Tacchini
Mario Jorge Fabris (ARI)	Civic Coalition View alliance parties: Generation for a National Encounter; ARI; Encuentro Popular; Movimiento Vecinalista Provincial; Voluntad para la Integración y el Desarrollo Auténtico	6,551	4.22%	0/12	0/4	—
Ariel Darío Arnedo (UCyB)	Unión PRO View alliance parties: Light Blue and White Union; PRO; Partido Nuevo Buenos Aires; Partido para la Acción Nueva	3,099	2.00%	0/12	0/4	—
Hugo Gass	UCR	1,575	1.02%	0/12	0/4	—
Jaime Castillo	Sociedad Justa View alliance parties: MID; Democratic Progressive Party; UNIR; Democratic Conservative Party; Movimiento Popular Bonaerense; Partido Auténtico; Partido Popular Cristiano Bonaerense	1,253	0.81%	0/12	0/4	—
Carlos Rivero	Partido Unidad Federalista	1,101	0.71%	0/12	0/4	—
Esteban Maitenu	MST	809	0.52%	0/12	0/4	—
Luis Alberto Antón	PO	773	0.50%	0/12	0/4	—
Marcelo Ariel Rivas	UCeDé	769	0.50%	0/12	0/4	—
Antonio Barrientos	FIT View alliance parties: PTS; New MAS; Socialist Left	661	0.43%	0/12	0/4	—
Ricardo Mansilla	Vamos View alliance parties: Federal Party; Partido Laborista de Buenos Aires; Movimiento de las Provincias Unidas; New Civic Union	436	0.28%	0/12	0/4	—
Gabriela Balbuena	PC	341	0.22%	0/12	0/4	—
Dante Silvetti	MIJyD	333	0.21%	0/12	0/4	—
Carmen Salcedo	Convocatoria de Integración Ciudadana	164	0.11%	0/12	0/4	—
Positive votes		155,165	91.48%			
Blank ballots		13,536	7.98%			
Invalid ballots		911	0.54%			
Turnout		169,612	78.58%			
Registered voters		215,840	100%			
Source: Junta Electoral de la Provincia de Buenos Aires
2005 Tigre Partido Legislative Election Sunday 23 October 2005
Mayoral Candidate	Party / Alliance	Votes	%	Councilors	School C.	Elected Officials
Midterm Election (No Executive)	Acción Comunal del Partido de Tigre	65,527	46.18%	8/12	2/4	Councilors: Juan Urionaguena; Roberto Oscar Ramón Romano; Ana María Ramos Fernandes Costa; José María Eguibar; Ernesto Raúl Girola; Irma Beatriz Brandoni; Juan Carlos Vilaqui; Luján Ramón Rago; School Councilors: Susana Inés Vera; Viviana María Roes
Midterm Election (No Executive)	Front for Victory View alliance parties: Victory Party; Broad Front; Movimiento H.A.C.E.R. por Buenos Aires; Nueva Democracia; Partido para la Acción Nueva; Polo Social	38,144	26.88%	4/12	2/4	Councilors: Ana María Grandi; José Alfredo Di Mateo; Carlos Daniel Gambino; María Alejandra Nardi; School Councilors: Carlos Alberto Araujo; Marcelo Ricardo Agosti
Midterm Election (No Executive)	Justicialist Party	9,981	7.03%	0/12	0/4	—
Midterm Election (No Executive)	ARI	5,932	4.18%	0/12	0/4	—
Midterm Election (No Executive)	Partido Unidad Federalista	5,833	4.11%	0/12	0/4	—
Midterm Election (No Executive)	Alianza PRO View alliance parties: Action for the Republic; Federal Party; Conservative People's Party; Compromiso para el Cambio; Democratic Progressive Party; RECREAR; Voluntad para la Integración y el Desarrollo Auténtico	3,316	2.34%	0/12	0/4	—
Midterm Election (No Executive)	Unión Vecinal de Tigre	2,737	1.93%	0/12	0/4	—
Midterm Election (No Executive)	UCR	1,912	1.35%	0/12	0/4	—
Midterm Election (No Executive)	PO	1,563	1.10%	0/12	0/4	—
Midterm Election (No Executive)	Humanist Party	1,346	0.95%	0/12	0/4	—
Midterm Election (No Executive)	Confederación Vecinal View alliance parties: Partido Celeste y Blanco; Open Politics for Social Integrity	1,223	0.86%	0/12	0/4	—
Midterm Election (No Executive)	MST	1,086	0.77%	0/12	0/4	—
Midterm Election (No Executive)	Frente Unión Popular View alliance parties: Popular Union; Democratic Conservative Party	751	0.53%	0/12	0/4	—
Midterm Election (No Executive)	Frente MAS — PTS View alliance parties: PTS; New MAS	657	0.46%	0/12	0/4	—
Midterm Election (No Executive)	Encuentro Amplio View alliance parties: Socialist Party; Communist Party; Intransigent Party	584	0.41%	0/12	0/4	—
Midterm Election (No Executive)	Frente Popular View alliance parties: Frente de la Militancia Popular; Movimiento Popular para la Reconquista	428	0.30%	0/12	0/4	—
Midterm Election (No Executive)	Movimiento por la Justicia Social	339	0.24%	0/12	0/4	—
Midterm Election (No Executive)	Federación Demócrata Cristiana View alliance parties: Christian Democratic Party; Partido de Renovación Federal	286	0.20%	0/12	0/4	—
Midterm Election (No Executive)	Partido Renovador de Buenos Aires	224	0.16%	0/12	0/4	—
Midterm Election (No Executive)	Partido Auténtico	21	0.01%	0/12	0/4	—
Midterm Election (No Executive)	Acción Ciudadana	9	0.01%	0/12	0/4	—
Positive votes		141,899	90.31%			
Blank ballots		13,616	8.67%			
Invalid ballots		1,604	1.02%			
Turnout		157,119	76.04%			
Registered voters		206,615	100%			
Source: Junta Electoral de la Provincia de Buenos Aires
2003 Tigre Partido Municipal Election Sunday 14 September 2003
Mayoral Candidate	Party / Alliance	Votes	%	Councilors	School C.	Elected Officials
Ricardo José Ubieto (Note: Died on 16 November 2006, succeeded by Hiram Antonio Gualdoni.)	Acción Comunal del Partido de Tigre	88,338	66.20%	10/12	4/4	Councilors: Hiram Antonio Gualdoni; Rubén Omar Agnez; Celia Nélida Geromel; Alberto Héctor Quijada; Jorge Alejandro Fernández; Marta Ángela Sendra De Vega; Héctor Herminio Cagnin; Saúl Renato Torasso; María Rita Vivas; Eduardo Héctor Sofía; School Councilors: María Cristina Chama; Alejandra Beatriz Manzelli; María Adelina Cousiño; Adriana Nora Di Carlo
Julio César Zamora	Justicialist Party	19,248	14.43%	2/12	0/4	Councilors: Ramón Alejandro Arrua; Omar Carlos Alberto Gómez
	Acción Federalista por Buenos Aires / Frente Unión y Libertad View alliance parties: Partido Unidad Federalista; Action for the Republic; Partido Celeste y Blanco; Partido Unión y Libertad	5,686	4.26%	0/12	0/4	—
	ARI + PI	4,175	3.13%	0/12	0/4	—
	Frente Popular Bonaerense View alliance parties: MODIN; Movimiento Popular Bonaerense; Partido Nuevo Buenos Aires	3,307	2.48%	0/12	0/4	—
	IU - PS View alliance parties: Communist Party; MST; Socialist Party	2,155	1.62%	0/12	0/4	—
	Autonomist Party	2,025	1.52%	0/12	0/4	—
	Acción Ciudadana de Tigre	1,583	1.19%	0/12	0/4	—
	UCR	1,215	0.91%	0/12	0/4	—
	RECREAR View alliance parties: RECREAR; Democratic Progressive Party	1,064	0.80%	0/12	0/4	—
	PO	1,017	0.76%	0/12	0/4	—
	Partido Humanista Ecologista	876	0.66%	0/12	0/4	—
	Unión Vecinal de Tigre	838	0.63%	0/12	0/4	—
	Encuentro Popular	519	0.39%	0/12	0/4	—
	PDC	472	0.35%	0/12	0/4	—
	Polo Social	366	0.27%	0/12	0/4	—
	PTS	309	0.23%	0/12	0/4	—
	Frente Cambia Buenos Aires View alliance parties: Frente para el Cambio; Nueva Democracia	194	0.15%	0/12	0/4	—
	Alianza Confluencia	30	0.02%	0/12	0/4	—
	VIDA	17	0.01%	0/12	0/4	—
Positive votes		133,434	93.64%			
Blank ballots		7,594	5.33%			
Invalid ballots		1,473	1.03%			
Turnout		142,501	70.87%			
Registered voters		201,074	100%			
Source: Junta Electoral de la Provincia de Buenos Aires
2001 Tigre Partido Legislative Election Sunday 14 October 2001
Mayoral Candidate	Party / Alliance	Votes	%	Councilors	School C.	Elected Officials
Midterm Election (No Executive)	Acción Comunal del Partido de Tigre	52,592	43.51%	8/12	2/4	Councilors: Pedro José Etcheverry; Antonio Carlos Grandoni; Ana María Ramos Fernandes Costa; Carlos Daniel Gambino; José María Eguibar; Irma Beatriz Brandoni; Luis Roberto Ulpiani; Hernán Gastón Giannazzo; School Councilors: Susana Inés Vera; Jorge Oscar Milne
Midterm Election (No Executive)	Frente Justicialista View alliance parties: Justicialist Party; UCeDé; Frente Compromiso Social (Open Politics for Social Integrity, Partido Auténtico, Partido Popular Cristiano Bonaerense); Social Progress Party	32,092	26.55%	4/12	2/4	Councilors: Raúl Osvaldo Mansilla; Ángel Pausides Icardo; Ana María Grandi; Gloria Adriana Ordeig; School Councilors: Ignacio Rafael Di Mateo; Leticia Elizabeth Salvetti
Midterm Election (No Executive)	Alianza View alliance parties: UCR; MID; Broad Front; Democratic Progressive Party; Autonomist Party	6,982	5.78%	0/12	0/4	—
Midterm Election (No Executive)	Partido Unidad Federalista	6,364	5.26%	0/12	0/4	—
Midterm Election (No Executive)	PSD (ARI)	4,731	3.91%	0/12	0/4	—
Midterm Election (No Executive)	Izquierda Unida View alliance parties: Communist Party; MST	3,673	3.04%	0/12	0/4	—
Midterm Election (No Executive)	Frente Renovador Popular View alliance parties: Conservative People's Party; Partido Renovador de Buenos Aires	3,639	3.01%	0/12	0/4	—
Midterm Election (No Executive)	Frente Polo Social View alliance parties: Free Fatherland Current; Christian Democratic Party; Frente para el Cambio; Intransigent Party; Movimiento Generacional Bonaerense; UNIR; Nueva Dirigencia; Por la Acción Nueva	3,437	2.84%	0/12	0/4	—
Midterm Election (No Executive)	Humanist Party	2,284	1.89%	0/12	0/4	—
Midterm Election (No Executive)	PO	2,092	1.73%	0/12	0/4	—
Midterm Election (No Executive)	PTS	1,072	0.89%	0/12	0/4	—
Midterm Election (No Executive)	Partido Laborista	979	0.81%	0/12	0/4	—
Midterm Election (No Executive)	Movimiento Popular para la Reconquista	749	0.62%	0/12	0/4	—
Midterm Election (No Executive)	PPR	189	0.16%	0/12	0/4	—
Positive votes		120,875	82.43%			
Blank ballots		13,628	9.29%			
Invalid ballots		12,134	8.28%			
Turnout		146,637	77.34%			
Registered voters		189,588	100%			
Source: Junta Electoral de la Provincia de Buenos Aires

==== Elections in the 1990s ====
Municipal Election Results (1990–1999)
1999 Tigre Partido General Election Sunday 24 October 1999
Mayoral Candidate	Party / Alliance	Votes	%	Councilors	School C.	Elected Officials
Ricardo Ubieto	Acción Comunal	83,371	60.59%	8/12	3/4	Councilors: Hiram Antonio Gualdoni; Julio S. Pando; Ernesto Raúl Girola; Jorge Carlos Watson; Nélida C. Vivas; Juan Urionaguena; Guillermo R. Edward; Inés P. Pertino; School Councilors: Susana Inés Vera; Celia Nélida Geromel; Jorge O. Milne
Ernesto Tenenbaum	Alliance (UCR-Frepaso)	25,125	18.26%	2/12	1/4	Councilors: Gustavo A. Posse; Norberto De Rentis; School Councilors: Fernando O. Centioni
Julio Zamora	Concertación Justicialista	23,061	16.76%	2/12	0/4	Councilors: Julio César Zamora; Fátima C. Pérez
Adolfo L. M. Sauli	Action for the Republic	3,702	2.69%	0/12	0/4	—
Positive votes		137,595	94.39%			
Blank ballots		6,681	4.58%			
Invalid ballots		1,501	1.03%			
Turnout		145,777	81.25%			
Registered voters		179,425	100%			
Source: Junta Electoral de la Provincia de Buenos Aires
1997 Tigre Partido Legislative Election Sunday 26 October 1997
Mayoral Candidate	Party / Alliance	Votes	%	Councilors	School C.	Elected Officials
Midterm Election (No Executive)	Acción Comunal	60,005	47.53%	7/12	2/4	Councilors: José María Eguibar; Antonio Carlos Grandoni; Ana María Ramos Fernandes Costa; Carlos Daniel Gambino; Roberto Oscar Ramón Romano; Irma Beatriz Brandoni; Luis Roberto Ulpiani; School Councilors: Raúl O. Mansilla; Marta A. Sendra
Midterm Election (No Executive)	Frente Justicialista Bonaerense	28,157	22.31%	3/12	1/4	Councilors: Jesús P. A. Vdovsovzen; Eduardo A. Fernández; Néstor J. Lima; School Councilors: Patricia E. Roldán
Midterm Election (No Executive)	Alliance (UCR-Frepaso)	27,157	21.51%	2/12	1/4	Councilors: Ricardo A. Ivoskus; Juan Carlos Zuccotti; School Councilors: Héctor J. Bonillo
Midterm Election (No Executive)	MODIN	2,385	1.89%	0/12	0/4	—
Positive votes		126,244	94.30%			
Blank ballots		6,279	4.69%			
Invalid ballots		1,349	1.01%			
Turnout		133,872	81.25%			
Registered voters		164,756	100%			
Source: Junta Electoral de la Provincia de Buenos Aires
1995 Tigre Partido General Election Sunday 14 May 1995
Mayoral Candidate	Party / Alliance	Votes	%	Councilors	School C.	Elected Officials
Ricardo Ubieto	Acción Comunal	69,949	58.30%	8/12	4/4	Councilors: Hiram Antonio Gualdoni; Julio S. Pando; Ernesto Raúl Girola; Jorge Carlos Watson; Nélida C. Vivas; Juan Urionaguena; Guillermo R. Edward; Inés P. Pertino
	Frente Justicialista Federal	24,858	20.72%	2/12	0/4	Councilors: Hugo O. P. Lezana; Julio César Zamora
	Frepaso	14,400	12.00%	2/12	0/4	Councilors: Norberto De Rentis; Luis Alberto Cancelo
	UCR	6,249	5.21%	0/12	0/4	—
Positive votes		119,975	94.70%			
Blank ballots		5,721	4.52%			
Invalid ballots		991	0.78%			
Turnout		126,687	81.56%			
Registered voters		155,337	100%			
Source: Junta Electoral de la Provincia de Buenos Aires
1993 Tigre Partido Legislative Election Sunday 3 October 1993
Mayoral Candidate	Party / Alliance	Votes	%	Councilors	School C.	Elected Officials
Midterm Election (No Executive)	Acción Comunal	48,550	43.16%	6/12	3/4	Councilors: José María Eguibar; Antonio Carlos Grandoni; Ana María Ramos Fernandes Costa; Carlos Daniel Gambino; Roberto Oscar Ramón Romano; Irma Beatriz Brandoni
Midterm Election (No Executive)	Frente Justicialista Federal	34,250	30.45%	4/12	1/4	Councilors: Jesús P. A. Vdovsovzen; Eduardo A. Fernández; Néstor J. Lima; Gualberto A. Godoy
Midterm Election (No Executive)	UCR	12,850	11.42%	2/12	0/4	Councilors: Ernesto E. Tenenbaum; Juan C. Zuccotti
Midterm Election (No Executive)	MODIN	10,540	9.37%	0/12	0/4	—
Positive votes		112,488	94.50%			
Blank ballots		5,120	4.30%			
Invalid ballots		1,429	1.20%			
Turnout		119,037	78.40%			
Registered voters		151,832	100%			
Source: Junta Electoral de la Provincia de Buenos Aires
1991 Tigre Partido General Election Sunday 27 October 1991
Mayoral Candidate	Party / Alliance	Votes	%	Councilors	School C.	Elected Officials
Ricardo Ubieto	Acción Comunal	46,801	45.12%	7/12	2/4	Councilors: Hiram Antonio Gualdoni; Julio S. Pando; Ernesto Raúl Girola; Jorge Carlos Watson; Nélida C. Vivas; Juan Urionaguena; Guillermo R. Edward
	Frente Justicialista Federal	30,125	29.04%	3/12	2/4	Councilors: Hugo O. P. Lezana; Julio César Zamora; Fátima C. Pérez
	UCR	12,450	12.00%	2/12	0/4	Councilors: Gustavo A. Posse; Norberto De Rentis
	MODIN	7,120	6.86%	0/12	0/4	—
Positive votes		103,724	92.15%			
Blank ballots		7,210	6.41%			
Invalid ballots		1,620	1.44%			
Turnout		112,554	79.20%			
Registered voters		142,113	100%			
Source: Junta Electoral de la Provincia de Buenos Aires

==== Elections in the 1980s ====
Municipal Election Results (1983–1989)
1989 Tigre Partido Legislative Election Sunday 14 May 1989
Mayoral Candidate	Party / Alliance	Votes	%	Councilors	School C.	Elected Officials
Midterm Election (No Executive)	Frente Justicialista de Unidad Popular	44,520	42.10%	5/12	3/4	Councilors: Justicialist councilors elected
Midterm Election (No Executive)	Acción Comunal	31,240	29.54%	4/12	1/4	Councilors: José María Eguibar; Antonio Carlos Grandoni; Ana María Ramos Fernandes Costa; Carlos Daniel Gambino
Midterm Election (No Executive)	UCR	20,150	19.05%	3/12	0/4	Councilors: UCR councilors elected
Midterm Election (No Executive)	UCeDe	5,120	4.84%	0/12	0/4	—
Positive votes		105,750	94.50%			
Blank ballots		3,820	3.41%			
Invalid ballots		2,340	2.09%			
Turnout		111,910	84.20%			
Registered voters		132,910	100%			
Source: Junta Electoral de la Provincia de Buenos Aires
1987 Tigre Partido General Election Sunday 6 September 1987
Mayoral Candidate	Party / Alliance	Votes	%	Councilors	School C.	Elected Officials
Ricardo Ubieto	Acción Comunal	35,712	36.12%	5/12	3/4	Councilors: Hiram Antonio Gualdoni; Julio S. Pando; Ernesto Raúl Girola; Jorge Carlos Watson; Nélida C. Vivas
	Justicialist Party	31,250	31.60%	4/12	1/4	Councilors: Justicialist councilors
	UCR	26,140	26.44%	3/12	0/4	Councilors: UCR councilors
Positive votes		98,875	95.10%			
Blank ballots		3,950	3.80%			
Invalid ballots		1,143	1.10%			
Turnout		103,968	83.50%			
Registered voters		124,512	100%			
Source: Junta Electoral de la Provincia de Buenos Aires
1985 Tigre Partido Legislative Election Sunday 3 November 1985
Mayoral Candidate	Party / Alliance	Votes	%	Councilors	School C.	Elected Officials
Midterm Election (No Executive)	Acción Comunal	27,150	30.50%	4/12	2/4	Councilors: First electoral victory of the local party; José María Eguibar; Antonio Carlos Grandoni
Midterm Election (No Executive)	UCR	26,520	29.80%	4/12	1/4	Councilors: UCR councilors
Midterm Election (No Executive)	Frente Justicialista de Liberación	24,110	27.10%	4/12	1/4	Councilors: PJ councilors
Midterm Election (No Executive)	Partido Intransigente	5,340	6.00%	0/12	0/4	—
Positive votes		89,000	94.60%			
Blank ballots		3,760	4.00%			
Invalid ballots		1,316	1.40%			
Turnout		94,076	81.80%			
Registered voters		115,007	100%			
Source: Junta Electoral de la Provincia de Buenos Aires
1983 Tigre Partido General Election Sunday 30 October 1983
Mayoral Candidate	Party / Alliance	Votes	%	Councilors	School C.	Elected Officials
Oscar Giordano	UCR	40,022	47.60%	12/24	6/6	Councilors: Return of democracy; UCR majority
	Justicialist Party	31,540	37.51%	10/24	0/6	Councilors: PJ minority
Ricardo Ubieto	Acción Comunal	6,720	7.99%	2/24	0/6	Councilors: Ricardo Ubieto (First term as councilor)
	Partido Intransigente	3,210	3.82%	0/24	0/6	—
Positive votes		84,078	93.00%			
Blank ballots		5,420	6.00%			
Invalid ballots		904	1.00%			
Turnout		90,402	85.40%			
Registered voters		105,857	100%			
Source: Junta Electoral de la Provincia de Buenos Aires

==== Elections in the 1970s and 1960s ====
Municipal Election Results (1963–1973)
1973 Tigre Partido General Election Sunday 11 March 1973
Mayoral Candidate	Party / Alliance	Votes	%	Councilors	School C.	Elected Officials
Néstor Obdulio Pozzi (PJ)	FREJULI View alliance parties: Justicialist Party; MID; Popular Conservative; Christian Popular Party	36,736	54.42%	14/20	4/6	Councilors: Lorenzo Mora; Luis Yolando Rufino; Alcira María Nogués; Martín Francisco Iriarte; Omar Humbruchner; Fermín Alberto García; Ismael Berterreigts; Roberto Antonio Pino; Haedo Gregorio Aguilar; Rodolfo Oscar Quinteros; Osvaldo Galupe; Luis Lacroix; Demoficia Alicia Mazzarella; Gerónimo Félix Muñoz
	UCR	9,222	13.66%	3/20	1/6	Councilors: Andrés Sotelo Tolosa; Rubén Alonso; Eloy E. Toscano
	Tigre Neighborhood Union	8,699	12.89%	3/20	1/6	Councilors: Alfredo Carrasquero; Alberto Rodolfo E. Parodi; Julián Llorenti
	Intransigent Party	4,180	6.19%	0/20	0/6	—
	Federalist Popular Alliance	3,796	5.62%	0/20	0/6	—
Positive votes		67,501	95.61%			
Blank ballots		2,786	3.95%			
Invalid ballots		311	0.44%			
Turnout		70,598	—			
Registered voters		—	—			
Source: Junta Electoral de la Provincia de Buenos Aires
1965 Tigre Partido Legislative Election Sunday 14 March 1965
Mayoral Candidate	Party / Alliance	Votes	%	Councilors	School C.	Elected Officials
Midterm Election (No Executive)	Popular Union (Peronist)	18,092	45.71%	6/10	2/3	Councilors: Raúl Eduardo Botelli; Domingo Manuel Ficicchia; Ismael Berterreigts; Juan Carlos Coria; Alcira María Nogués; Juan Carlos Ruiz
Midterm Election (No Executive)	UCR-P	12,130	30.65%	4/10	1/3	Councilors: José Pedro Etcheverry; Ramón Varela; Eloy E. Toscano; Juan Bofarull
Midterm Election (No Executive)	UCRI	1,959	4.95%	0/10	0/3	—
Midterm Election (No Executive)	Democratic Socialist Party	1,238	3.13%	0/10	0/3	—
Midterm Election (No Executive)	Conservative Union	1,029	2.60%	0/10	0/3	—
Positive votes		39,579	95.67%			
Blank ballots		1,792	4.33%			
Invalid ballots		—	—			
Turnout		41,371	—			
Registered voters		—	—			
Source: Junta Electoral de la Provincia de Buenos Aires
1963 Tigre Partido General Election Sunday 7 July 1963
Mayoral Candidate	Party / Alliance	Votes	%	Councilors	School C.	Elected Officials
Indirect Election	UCR-P	10,644	35.08%	8/20	3/6	Councilors: José A. Recio; Virgilio Velázquez; Héctor J. Panchazzi; Juan Esnoz; Hugo J. Diminutto; Andrés S. Tolosa; Raúl Masud; José Degiovanni
Indirect Election	UCRI	6,851	22.58%	5/20	2/6	Councilors: Alfredo Carrasquero; Mario Vega; Héctor E. Lettieri; Roberto C. Erhart; Lelio A. De Panphilis
Indirect Election	Union of the Argentine People	2,750	9.06%	2/20	1/6	Councilors: Oscar Abadie; Eugenio Jorge Leroux
Indirect Election	Democratic Socialist Party	2,561	8.44%	1/20	0/6	Councilors: Alfredo Arderius
Indirect Election	Democratic Progressive Party	2,002	6.60%	1/20	0/6	Councilors: Román Vettorato
Positive votes		30,341	77.17%			
Blank ballots		8,150	20.73%			
Invalid ballots		825	2.10%			
Turnout		39,316	—			
Registered voters		—	—			
Source: Junta Electoral de la Provincia de Buenos Aires

== Transportation ==
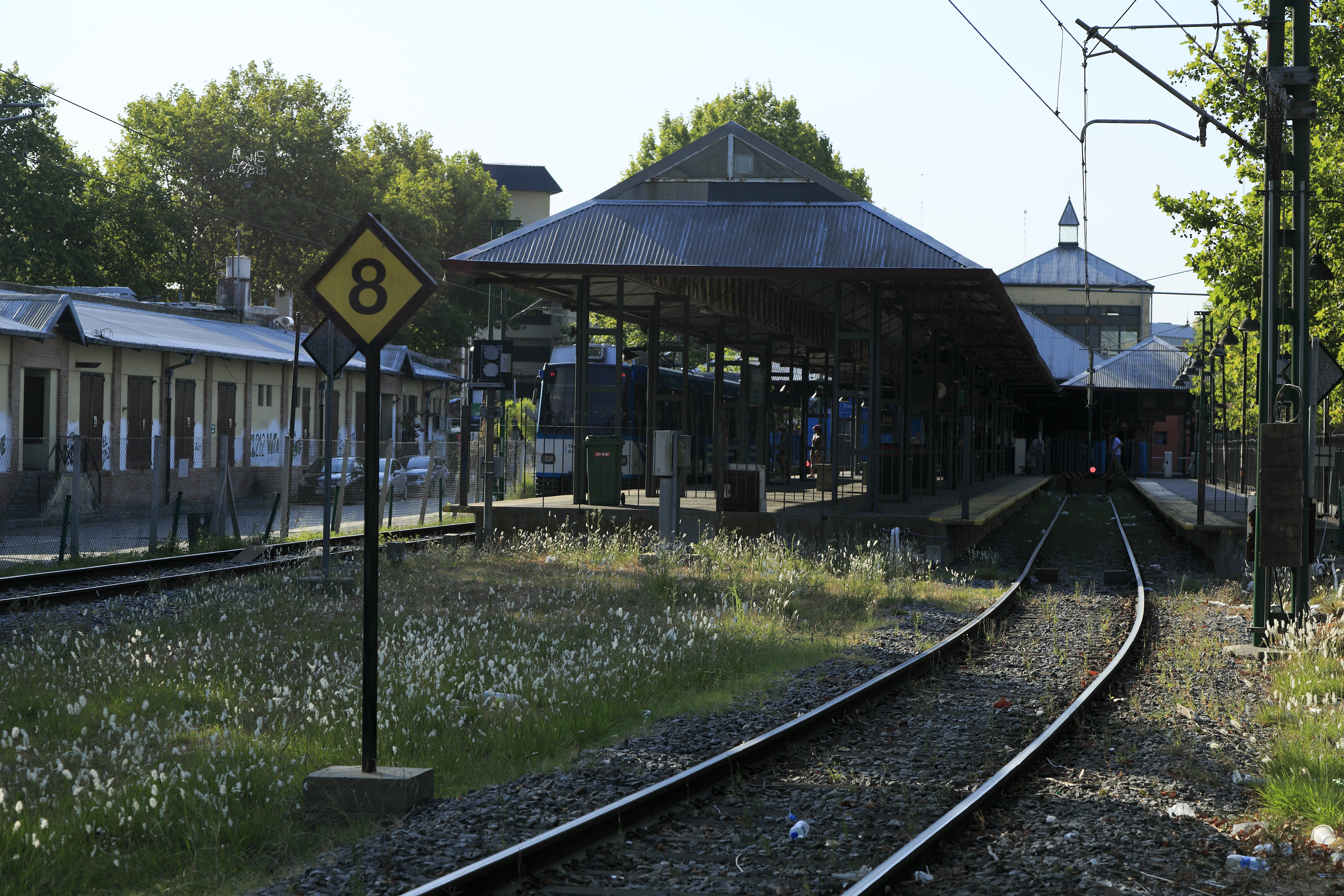
Delta railway station, terminal of the Tren de la Costa.

The Tigre Partido has excellent connectivity with the City of Buenos Aires and the rest of the metropolitan area through a complex network of railways, roads, and river transport.

=== Railways ===
The district is crossed by five railway branches belonging to two different lines:

- Mitre Line (Retiro–Tigre branch): This electrified line connects the district directly to Retiro Mitre in Buenos Aires. It is the most popular commuter link. The stations within the district are Carupá (shared with San Fernando) and the terminal Tigre.
- Tren de la Costa (Maipú–Delta branch): A light rail tourist line that runs along the river coast. Its northern terminal, Delta, is located in Tigre, connecting with the connection to Olivos and the Mitre Line at Maipú station.
- Belgrano Norte Line: A diesel commuter line connecting Retiro Belgrano with Villa Rosa. It serves the industrial and residential south-west of the district with two stations: Don Torcuato and Vicealmirante Montes.
- Mitre Line (Villa Ballester–Zárate branch): A diesel service that serves the localities of General Pacheco (General Pacheco station) and Benavídez (Benavídez station).
- Mitre Line (Victoria–Capilla del Señor branch): Another diesel branch serving the localities of El Talar (El Talar station) and Ricardo Rojas (López Camelo station).

=== Bus Services ===
The district is served by a dense network of public bus routes (colectivos) that connect the different localities with each other and with the Capital Federal.

- Local and Metropolitan Lines: 15, 21, 57, 60, 80, 87, 127, 194, 203, 204A, 204B, 228 (branches A, B, F), 244, 291, 303, 315, 341, 343, 365, 379, 391, 430, 437, 448, 720, 721, 722, and 723.

=== River Transport ===
Tigre is the main hub for passenger river transport in Argentina. The Estación Fluvial de Tigre (River Station) serves as the terminal for the lanchas colectivas (public transport boats) that function like aquatic buses, connecting the islands of the Paraná Delta with the mainland. These boats are operated by several private companies (such as Interisleña, Jilguero, and Líneas Delta) and are the only means of public access to the insular sector.

== Local media ==
The district has a variety of local media outlets covering news from its neighborhoods and the wider northern zone:

- El Talar Noticias
- Industria y Nación (Business and industry news)
- Tigre Noticias
- Norte Online
- Politica Tigre (Digital newspaper)
- Para Todos (Regional news coverage)
- Infobán
- El Comercio On Line
- InfoData35
- Pluma de Río

== See also ==
- Tigre, Buenos Aires
- Paraná Delta
- Greater Buenos Aires
- Nordelta
