= Rincón de Milberg =

- Town
- Location in Greater Buenos Aires
- Coordinates: 34°24′50″S 58°36′11″W
- Country: Argentina
- Province: Buenos Aires
- Partido: Tigre

Population (2001 census [INDEC])
  - Total: 28,620
- CPA Base: B 1624
- Area code: +54 11

Rincón de Milberg is a town located on one of the islands that make up the Tigre Partido, in the Buenos Aires Province, Argentina. It forms part of the Greater Buenos Aires urban agglomeration.

== Geography ==
=== Population ===
According to the 2001 census INDEC, the town had a population of 28,620 inhabitants.

=== Boundaries ===
The area comprises the territory between the Pacheco lowlands (bajos de Pacheco), Williams Street, the Luján River, the Aliviador Canal, and the Guasú Nambí Stream.

=== Access ===
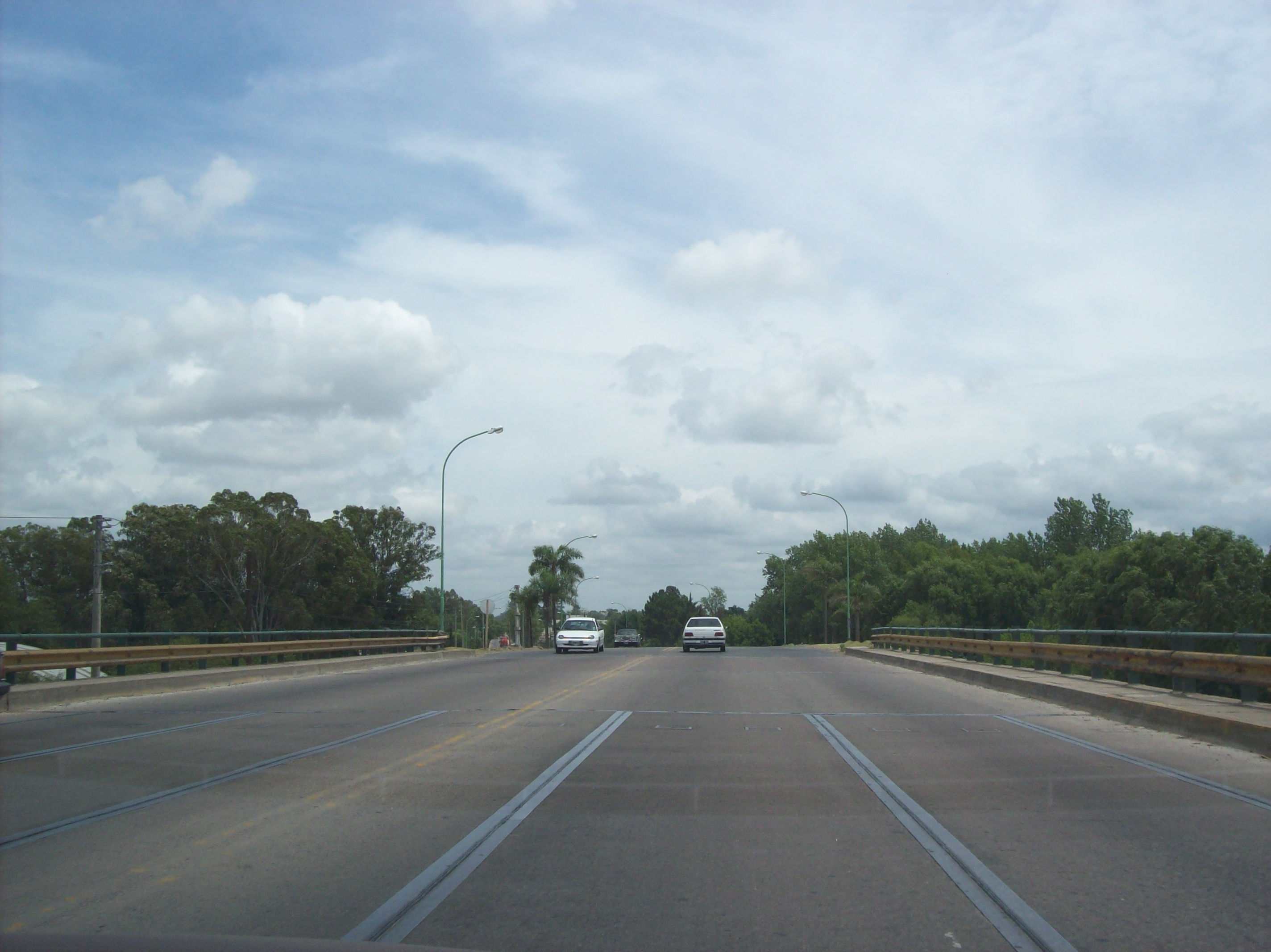
Provincial Route 27 bridge over the Aliviador Canal.

From the city of Tigre, Rincón de Milberg is accessible via several bridges crossing the Reconquista River, which is bordered by Liniers Street. Two of the most important bridges are the one connecting Santa María Avenue (Provincial Route 27) with 25 de Mayo Street, and the bridge connecting Libertador Gral. San Martín Boulevard (known as Avenida de las Palmeras) with José C. Paz Street. The only access point from the city of Benavídez is Provincial Route 27, which takes the name Benavídez Avenue within that city.

== History ==
The lands that form the Rincón de Milberg area were originally owned by López Camelo. Due to an enmity with Pacheco and a desire not to own lands bordering those of his enemy, Camelo offered them for sale to his friend Juan Milberg Dillan, who at the time was the Justice of the Peace in his native Barracas.

After celebrating his marriage to Ángela Arditi Rojas, Milberg Dillan settled in his new Estancia on the newly acquired lands, which he named "El Rincón" (The Corner). The many descendants of this marriage eventually sold off parcels of the land until the area took its current form, which consists of an urban layout featuring a thriving commercial center alongside several gated communities.

== Religion ==
The town is part of the Roman Catholic Diocese of San Isidro.

Catholic Church
Diocese	San Isidro
Parish	Nuestra Señora del Perpetuo Socorro
