= Ricardo Rojas, Buenos Aires =

Ricardo Rojas
- Locality
- Location in Greater Buenos Aires
- Coordinates: 34°27′14″S 58°40′48″W
- Country: Argentina
- Province: Buenos Aires
- Partido: Tigre

Government
  - Intendant: Julio Zamora (UP)

Population (2001 census [INDEC])
  - Total: 19,492
- CPA Base: B 1610
- Area code: +54 011 / 03327

Ricardo Rojas is a locality in Tigre Partido in Buenos Aires Province, Argentina. It forms part of the Greater Buenos Aires urban conurbation in the northern zone of the metropolitan area.

== Geography ==
=== Neighborhoods ===
The locality is divided into the following neighborhoods:

- Ricardo Rojas
- López Camelo
- Bello Horizonte (Gated community)
- Parque San Lorenzo
- Los Ceibos (Semi-private neighborhood)
- Las Tunas
- Delfino
- El Dorsal

== Transport ==
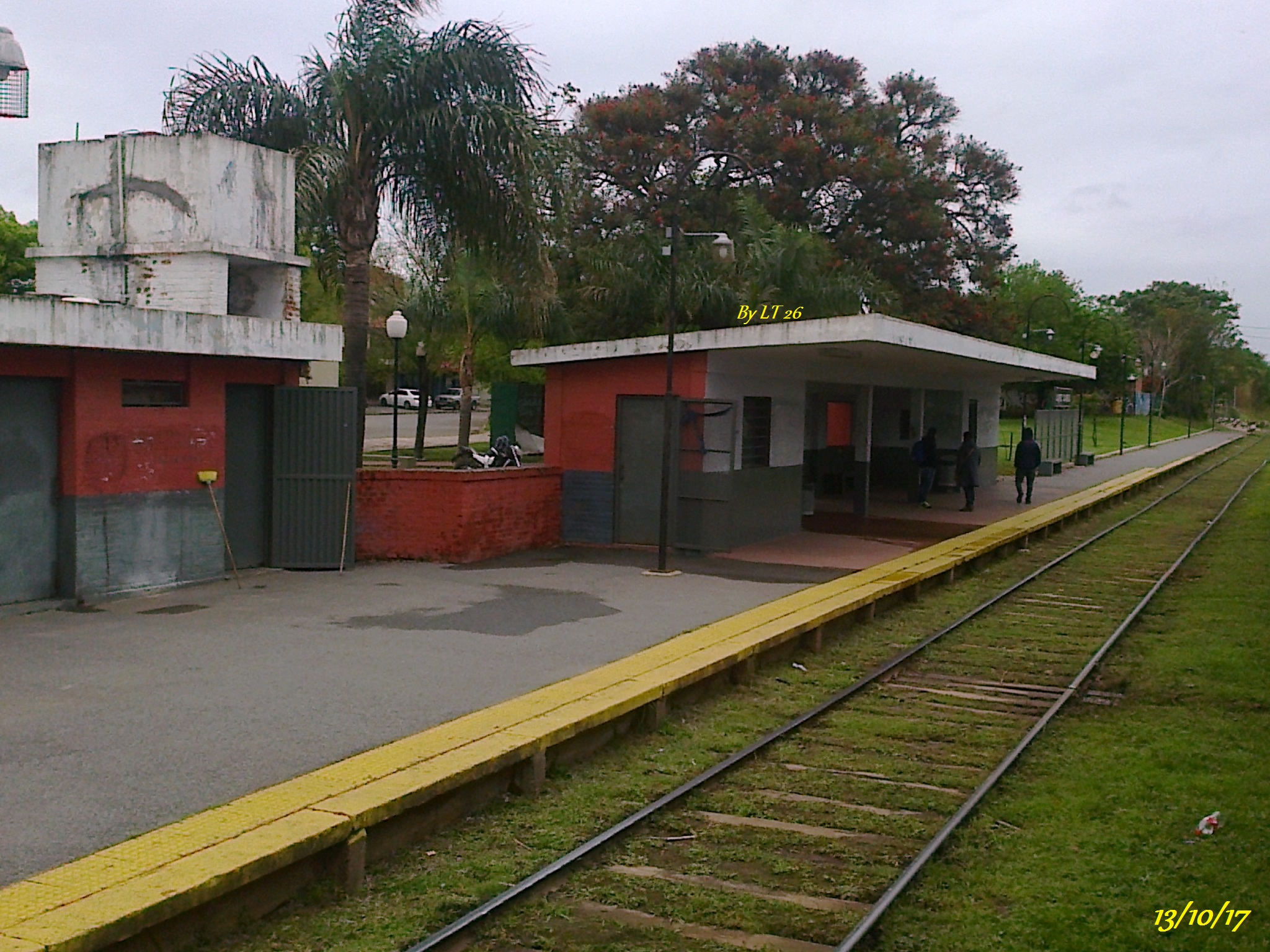
Ricardo Rojas's López Camelo train station

The locality is served by López Camelo railway station on the Mitre Line.

== Religion ==
The locality belongs to the Roman Catholic Diocese of San Isidro. Its parish is San Juan Bautista.

== Media ==
Several local media outlets cover events in the district and its neighborhoods, including Infoban, Para Todos, El Comercio Online, De Norte a Norte Noticias, and the Ricardo Rojas Cultural Circuit.

== Demographics ==
According to the 2001 census [INDEC], the locality had a population of 19,492.
