= Néstor de Vicente =

Argentine footballer

Personal information
- Full name: Néstor Adrián de Vicente
- Date of birth: 16 June 1964
- Place of birth: Sarandí, Argentina
- Date of death: 20 March 2011 (aged 46)
- Place of death: Rincón de Milberg, Argentina
- Position: Midfielder

Senior career*
Years	Team	Apps	(Gls)
1982–1985	River Plate	?	(?)
1985–1986	Instituto	?	(?)
1986–1987	Talleres	?	(?)
1987–1988	Platense	?	(?)
1989–1993	Grasshopper	?	(?)
1993–1994	Estudiantes	11	(0)
1994–1998	Racing Club	91	(11)
Total		?	(?)
- * Club domestic league appearances and goals

Néstor Adrián de Vicente (16 June 1964 – 20 March 2011) was an Argentine professional footballer who played as a midfielder.

== Career ==
De Vicente played in Argentina for River Plate, Instituto, Talleres, Platense, Estudiantes and Racing Club, and in Switzerland for Grasshopper.

== Later life and death ==
De Vicente died on 20 March 2011, in a car crash, at the age of 46.
