= Benavídez =

- City
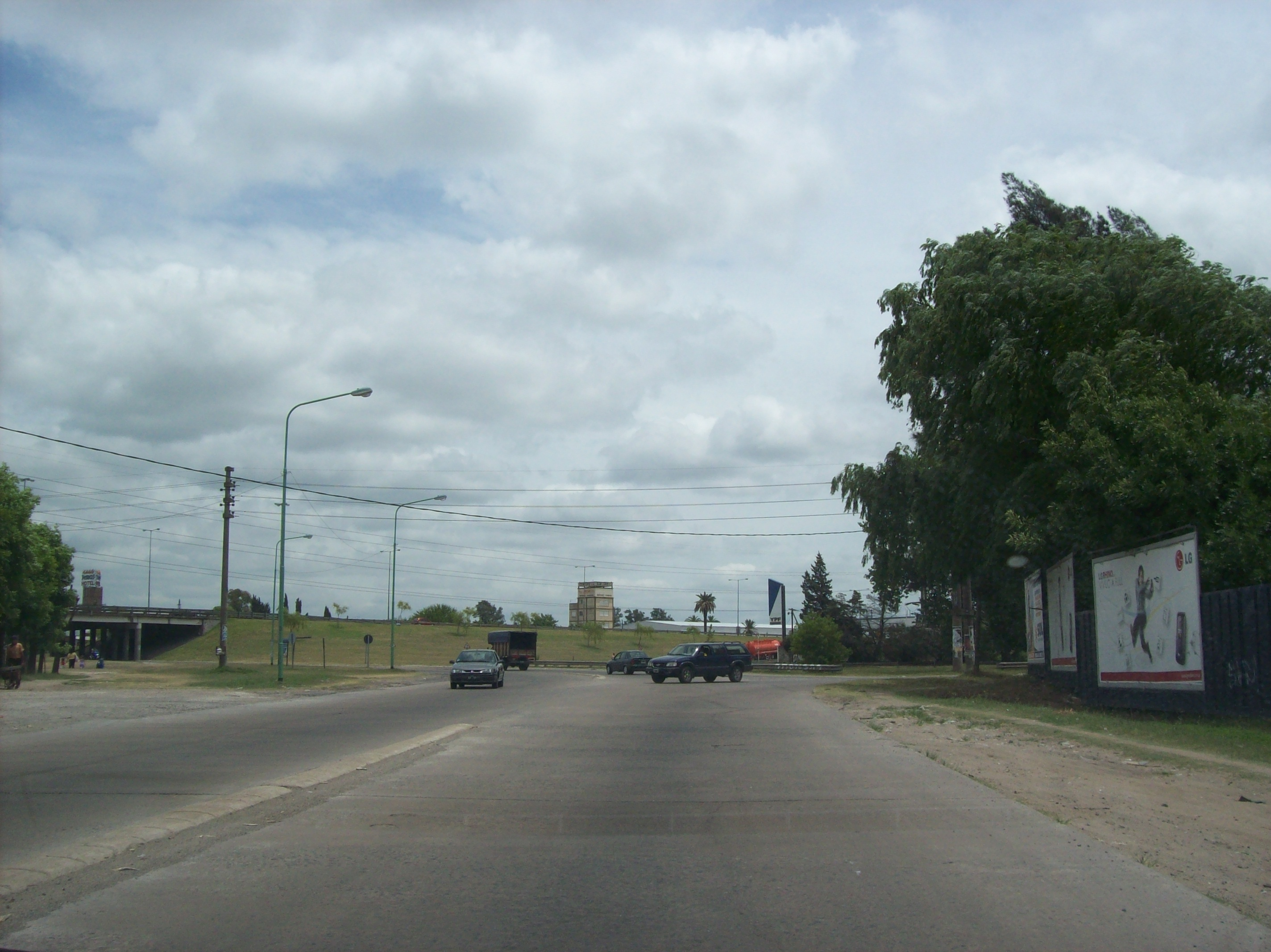
- Acceso Norte seen from Juan Bautista Alberdi Avenue

- Location in Greater Buenos Aires
- Coordinates: 34°24′34″S 58°32′34″W
- Country: Argentina
- Province: Buenos Aires
- Partido: Tigre
- First land auction: 1929

Government
  - Intendant: Julio Zamora (UP)
- Elevation: 11 m (36 ft)

Population (2001 census [INDEC])
  - Total: 34,162
- CPA Base: B 1621
- Area code: +54 03327 / 03484

Benavídez is a city in Tigre Partido in Buenos Aires Province, Argentina. It forms part of the Greater Buenos Aires urban conurbation in the northern zone of the metropolitan area.

== Geography ==
=== Location ===
Benavídez has direct access to the city of Buenos Aires via the General Mitre line of the General Bartolomé Mitre Railway through Benavídez railway station, as well as by the Autopista Pascual Palazzo (Pan-American Highway).

The city borders the localities of Garín, Ingeniero Maschwitz, Dique Luján, Tigre, and General Pacheco.

=== Neighborhoods ===
The residential sector of Benavídez is known as Residencial de Tigre. It is divided into several neighborhoods:

- Ojo de Agua
- Los Olmos
- Las Casitas
- El Prado
- Esperanza
- Don Bosco
- El Progreso
- El Arco
- El Claro
- San Vicente
- San Patricio
- San Lucas
- Barrio IRSA
- Altos de Benavídez
- Complejo Villanueva
- Barrio La Mascota
- Lomas de Benavídez
- La Bota
- Villa Bertha

== Economy ==
Benavídez is characterized by a large sector of country houses (casas-quintas) and gated communities inhabited by upper-middle and upper-class residents. The commercial center is located on Alvear Avenue between Maraboto and General Pacheco streets, featuring supermarkets, clothing stores, bookstores, bazaars, hardware stores, glass shops, and other businesses.

== Sports ==
Benavídez is home to Club Newman, located in a gated community of the same name, known for its rugby team. Other gated communities in the area include Villa Bertha, Las Glorias, and those within the Villanueva complex: San Rafael, San Gabriel, San Francisco, Santa Clara, Santa Catalina, San Pedro, Vila Vela, San Agustín, Santa Teresa, San Marcos, San Carlos, San Pablo, San Benito, Santa Ana, Casas de Santa Ana, Casas de Santa María, and Casas de San Patricio.

Club 12 de Octubre, located at Belgrano 2600, offers various activities including basketball, futsal, and roller skating.

== Technology ==
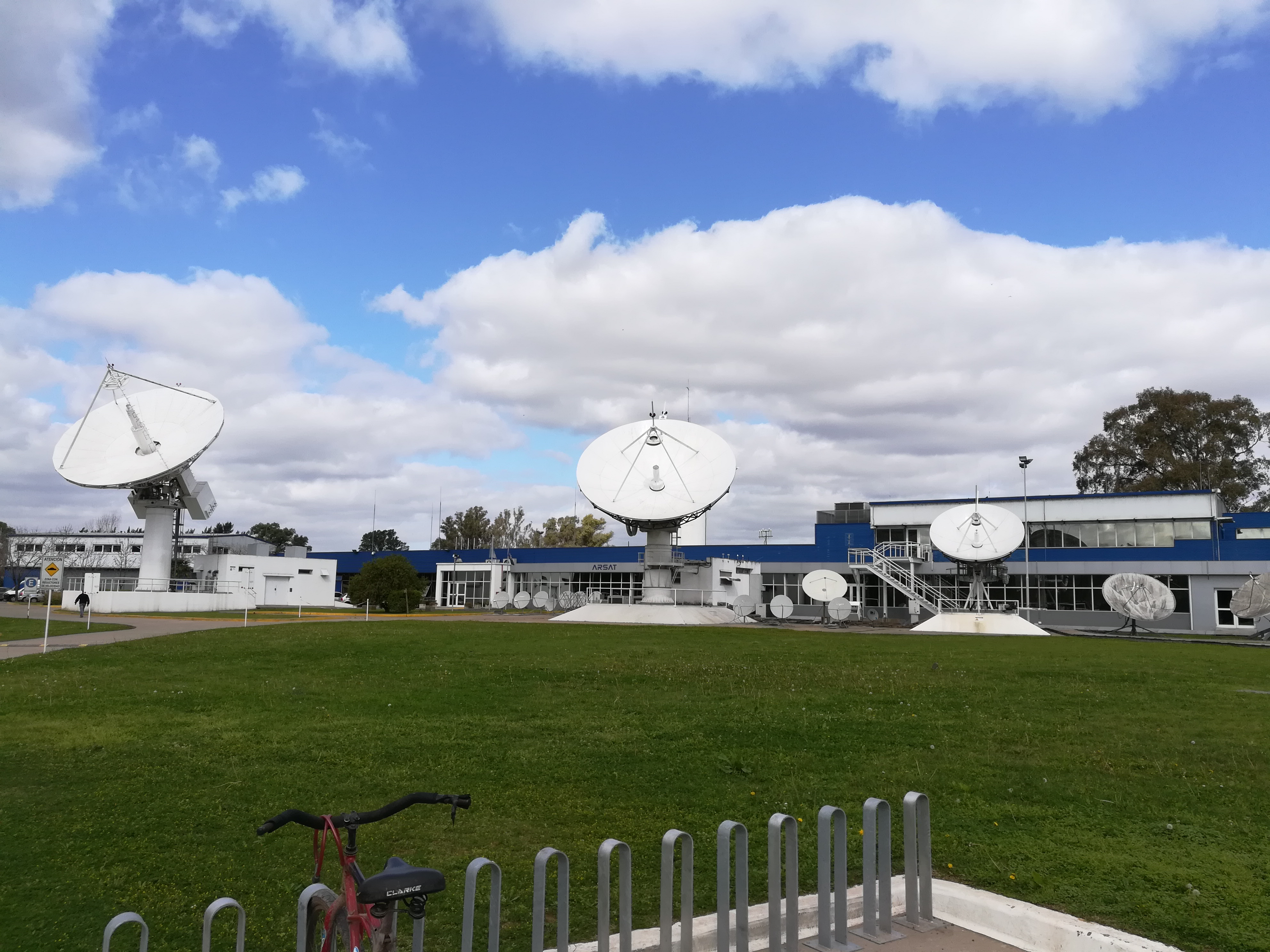
Benavídez station and ARSAT HQs

The Benavídez Earth Station is Argentina's third earth station and serves as the operations center for ARSAT (Argentine Company of Satellite Solutions). Inaugurated on 21 June 1996, the facility is equipped with the necessary infrastructure to control satellites and send and receive signals. The station has antennas that provide television, Internet access, data services, and IP telephony to southern South America and North America.

From this facility, ARSAT controls and receives data from Argentina's first geostationary satellite, ARSAT-1, as well as ARSAT-2.

== Religion ==
The city is part of the Roman Catholic Diocese of San Isidro.

Catholic Church
Diocese	San Isidro
Parish	Nuestra Señora del Carmen

In addition to the Nuestra Señora del Carmen Parish, located in the center on Jujuy Street and Alvear Avenue facing Plaza San Martín, several chapels depend on it: Nuestra Señora de Itatí (in El Progreso neighborhood), Capilla San Cayetano (in El Arco neighborhood), Capilla Santa María de la Esperanza, San Agustín, Capilla San Antonio, María Salud de los Enfermos, and Vicaría Santa Elena (a retreat house named Cura Brochero).

Benavídez also has a house of the Missionaries of Charity, founded by Mother Teresa, and a headquarters of the Patronato de la Infancia, which includes the Nuestra Señora de Loreto chapel. In the San Benito neighborhood within the Villanueva complex, the San Juan de Luz chapel operates, attached to the Sedes Sapientiae School.
