= Argentina census =

Decennial federal census

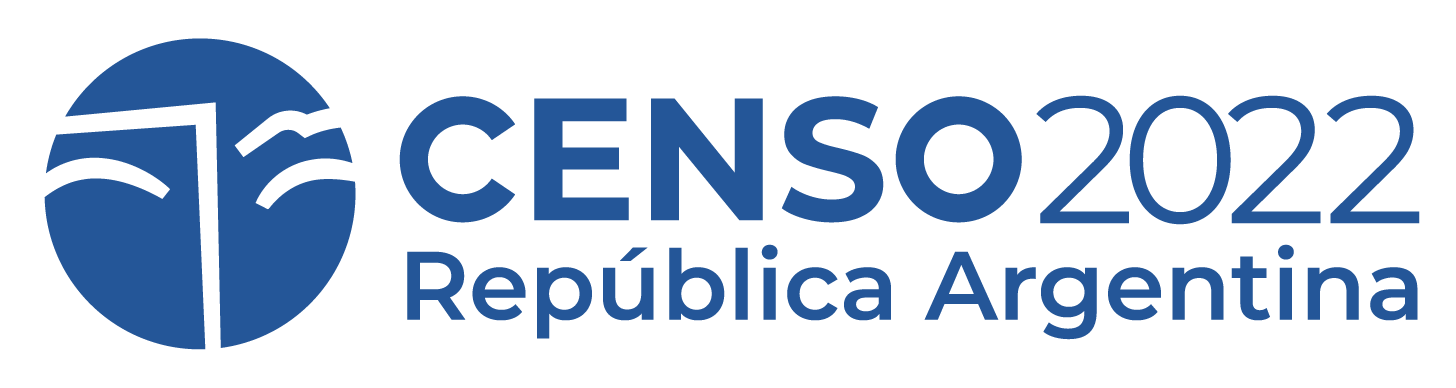
- 2022 census logo
- Frequency: Decennial
- Country: Argentina
- Inaugurated: 1869; 157 years ago
- Most recent: 18 May 2022; 4 years ago
- Website: censo.gob.ar

The Argentina census (Spanish: Censo Nacional de Población, Hogares y Viviendas en la Argentina) is a census that takes place every 10 years since 1960. (Note: Except for 1990 and 2000, postponed for one year due to budgetary reasons, and 2020, postponed to 2022 due to the COVID-19 pandemic.) The first census was taken in 1869, under president Domingo Faustino Sarmiento; there have been 11 federal censuses since that time. The most recent national census took place in 2022. Since 1968, the National Institute of Statistics and Census of Argentina is the public body responsible for conducting the census.

== History ==
Adapted from the official website.

| Year | Date | Total population | Change in population |
|---|---|---|---|
| 1869 | 15–17 September | 1,877,490 | |
| 1895 | 10 May | 4,044,911 | ▲115.4% |
| 1914 | 1 June | 7,905,502 | ▲95.4% |
| 1947 | 10–21 April, 10–12 May | 15,803,827 | ▲99.9% |
| 1960 | 30 September | 20,013,793 | ▲26.6% |
| 1970 | 30 September | 23,364,431 | ▲16.7% |
| 1980 | 22 October | 27,949,480 | ▲19.6% |
| 1991 | 15 May | 32,615,528 | ▲16.6% |
| 2001 | 17–18 November | 36,260,130 | ▲11.1% |
| 2010 | 27 October | 40,117,096 | ▲10.6% |
| 2022 | 18 May | 46,044,703 | ▲13.7% |

== Immigration ==
Only European immigrants (1869)

Only European immigrants (1895)

Only European immigrants (1914)

Only European immigrants (1947)

Only South American immigrants (2022)
