= Nordelta, Buenos Aires =

Nordelta
- Motto: "Es vivir muy bien" ("It is living well")
- Interactive map of Nordelta
- Coordinates: 34°24′36″S 58°39′18″W
- Country: Argentina
- Province: Buenos Aires
- Partido: Tigre
- Founded: 1999

Population (2014)
  - Total: 25,000
- Time zone: UTC−3 (ART)
- Website: http://www.nordelta.com/ingles/inicio.htm

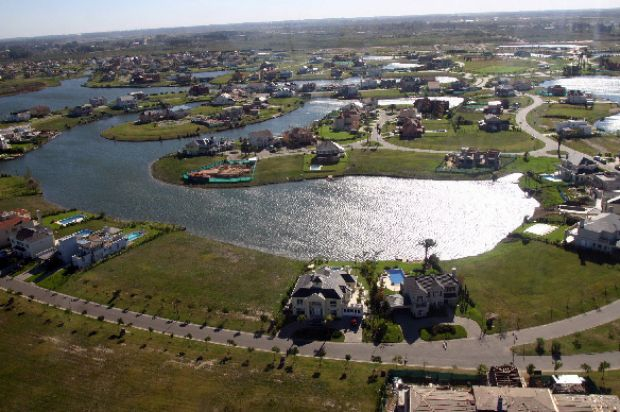
Nordelta

Nordelta is an affluent city in Tigre Partido, Buenos Aires Province, Argentina, about 30 kilometres (19 mi) from Buenos Aires. It consists of a large gated community made up originally of nine neighborhoods, founded in 1999 and known as the first ciudadpueblo ("city-ville" in English) of Argentina; it is close to the towns of General Pacheco and Benavidez. Nordelta has been referred to as "the Miami of the Argentina".

When compared to older gated communities in Pilar, Nordelta's natural features (trees, plants, etc.) stand out as too "artificial", because Pilar's trees, for instance, are very large and mature compared to Nordelta's miniature trees.

Because of its size and relatively affluent population, Nordelta has developed and maintained commercial and services infrastructure, including swimming pools, soccer and tennis fields, a shopping mall, a medical center, a sports club, four private schools, playgrounds, and saunas. Over the years, there has been development of new neighborhoods as more people moved in. It was one of the first places in Argentina to have a Telecom communications network of a new generation.

The Nordelta project has been criticised for encroaching upon the Paraná wetlands, the habitat for wildlife and, with other processes such as urban sprawl and the extension of farming, contributing to wildfires and reducing the capacity of the land to absorb rainfall.

The people of Nordelta created the Nordelta Foundation, in an effort to help improve the quality of life of poor people living in Las Tunas, a shantytown located very close to Nordelta.

== History ==
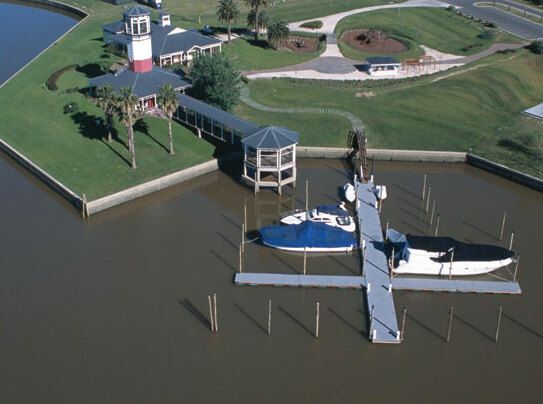
A marina club house in the Nordelta area.

The district was built on swampy land after it had been shaped into a series of lakes surrounded by grass and trees, making the place attractive for people seeking a calm life. The district is the largest and most successful example of gated communities in Greater Buenos Aires, and is said to greatly improve the urban setting and standard of living of the population in general in the area. This idea dates back to a long history attempting to “civilize” swampy or flood-prone lands, often portraying them as empty, unproductive spaces despite being ecologically rich and inhabited areas. These imaginaries of “vacant land” resurfaced in the 1990s, when real estate developers reframed the delta’s wetlands as the ideal site for modern enclaves. In addition to the quiet and landscaped settings, the main attraction for residents is the multiple layers of security that make it much more secure than the surrounding area and other smaller developments. Marketed as a self-contained city, Nordelta included private schools, hospitals, shopping centers, and recreational facilities, all secured by controlled-access perimeters. Its model has been interpreted as a prime example of gated urbanism in Latin America, deepening social and spatial segregation between affluent residents and surrounding neighborhoods. Consultatio, with Eduardo Constantini as head, was involved in the project as 50 percent investor.

By the year 2000, 98 people were living in Nordelta.

In 2004, during construction works, human remains and ceramic pieces were discovered on the site. The findings sparked mobilization by neighbors and Indigenous groups, including the Movimiento en Defensa de la Pacha Mama, who sought to protect the area as a place of cultural and historical significance. These efforts ultimately led to the recognition of the Communitarian, Ancestral, Sacred, and Educational Indigenous Peoples' Territory of Punta Querandí.

In December 2004, 30 musicians on a raft on Nordelta's information center's lake, from the Argentine Orquesta Sinfónica Nacional, gave an open-air concert.

On February 4th, 2005, a tennis match between two famous players was held in Nodelta, in which Argentine Guillermo Cañas beat Spaniard Carlos Moyà by 6-1 and 6-2.

On May 6, 2006, pianist Horacio Lavandera played a concert to an audience of over 800 people. Proceeds were donated to the Nordelta Foundation.

A bit later on May 18, singer Fabiana Cantilo performed to an audience of 700 people. Proceeds were donated to the Nordelta Foundation.

On August 19, Vicentico performed to an audience of 1400 people, with proceeds allocated to the Nordelta Foundation.

Diego Torres held a concert in Nordelta to 3,000 people, sending the year 2006 off with a two-hour party; by the year 2007, approximately 10,000 inhabitants were living in the district.

On May 19, 2007, Horacio Lavandera, along with 30 musician of the National Symphony Orchestra under the direction of Pedro Ignacio Calderón, once again played in a concert in honor of Ludwig van Beethoven. The event was exclusive for property owners of Nordelta and their guests.

On June 2, Gustavo Cerati, a famous rock musician, staged a concert in Nordelta, with over 2,000 people attending. Proceeds from the tickets sold were allocated to the charitable organization Nordelta Foundation, to aid Las Tunas.

As of 2021 the development was one of the locations of the "Soltando Amarras" Bioflow program.

A severe car accident took place in Nordelta, on October 18, 2009. Four people died when a car sunk into an artificial lake inside the property.

In late 2021, there was an invasion of carpinchos (capybaras), which destroyed lawns, bit dogs, caused traffic accidents, and deposited excrement to a point where some residents were forced to fence their lawns from their encroachment. Ecologist Enrique Viale said it was a mistake to view the influx as an invasion: "It's the other way round: Nordelta invaded the ecosystem of the carpinchos". Some critics of Nordelta as an enclave for the wealthy have satirically supported the carpinchos recovering their habitat, viewing them as a symbol of class war in Argentina.

== Family structure ==
The family structures in Nordelta, a wealthy suburban area in Greater Buenos Aires, mostly follow international and national trends influenced by the economic and social environment of the region. The nuclear family, made up of a married couple with professional jobs and their children, is the most common. Many families can afford to hire servants, which helps them manage a dual-income household while still being involved in their children's lives. Education and extracurricular activities are highly valued, allowing children to develop both academically and personally.

Extended families are less common in Nordelta compared to other areas of Argentina. However, close relationships with extended family members, like grandparents, are maintained through childcare and family gatherings, even if they don't live together.

Single-parent and blended families are also present, but they may face more challenges due to the high costs of living in such an affluent area. Single-parent families, in particular, might struggle financially compared to dual-income households. Blended families may encounter difficulties fitting into the traditional family model that still exists in these communities. However, both types of families are becoming more accepted as Argentine society evolves.

Child-free families, especially among younger, career-focused couples, are also more common in Nordelta. These families often choose not to have children due to their lifestyle preferences. While there may be some social pressure to follow the traditional family model, Nordelta's progressive, upscale community is increasingly open to accepting various family types.

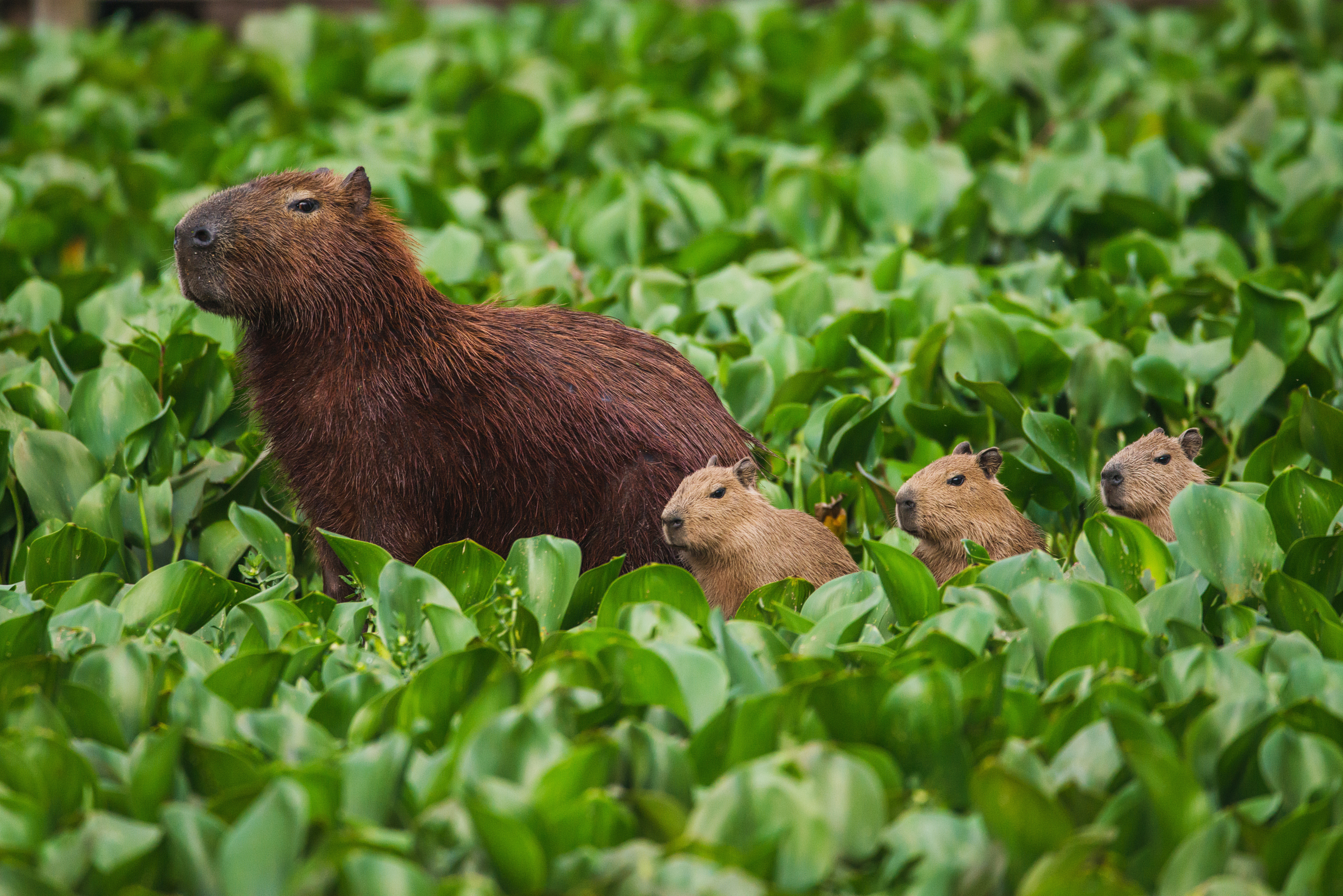
A capybara or carpincho. Capybaras recovered their habitat in Nordelta

== Criticism ==
Environmentalists disapprove of Nordelta because it is built on the wetlands of the River Paraná, a major river second only to the Amazon in South America in terms of size. Enrique Viale said "Wealthy real-estate developers with government backing have to destroy nature in order to sell clients the dream of living in the wild – because the people who buy those homes want nature, but without the mosquitoes, snakes or capybaras".

The vast Paraná wetlands have been encroached upon by urban sprawl and cattle and soy farmers, partly responsible for wildfires that have destroyed vast areas. Wetland projects like Nordelta prevent the land from absorbing rains, so extreme rainfall leads to flooding of nearby, poorer, neighbourhoods.

== Neighborhoods ==
1. El Golf
2. La Isla
3. Los Castores
4. Portezuelo
5. Las Caletas
6. Las Glorietas
7. La Alameda
8. Barrancas del Lago
9. Los Sauces
10. Cabos del Lago
11. Los Alisos
12. Bahía Grande
13. El Palmar
14. El Yacht
All the flags share an element in common: The sun.

== Schools ==
- Northlands
- Michael Ham Memorial College
- Colegio Cardenal Pironio
- Northfield School
