= Luján River =

River in Argentina

Coordinates: 34°25′55″S 58°32′28″W

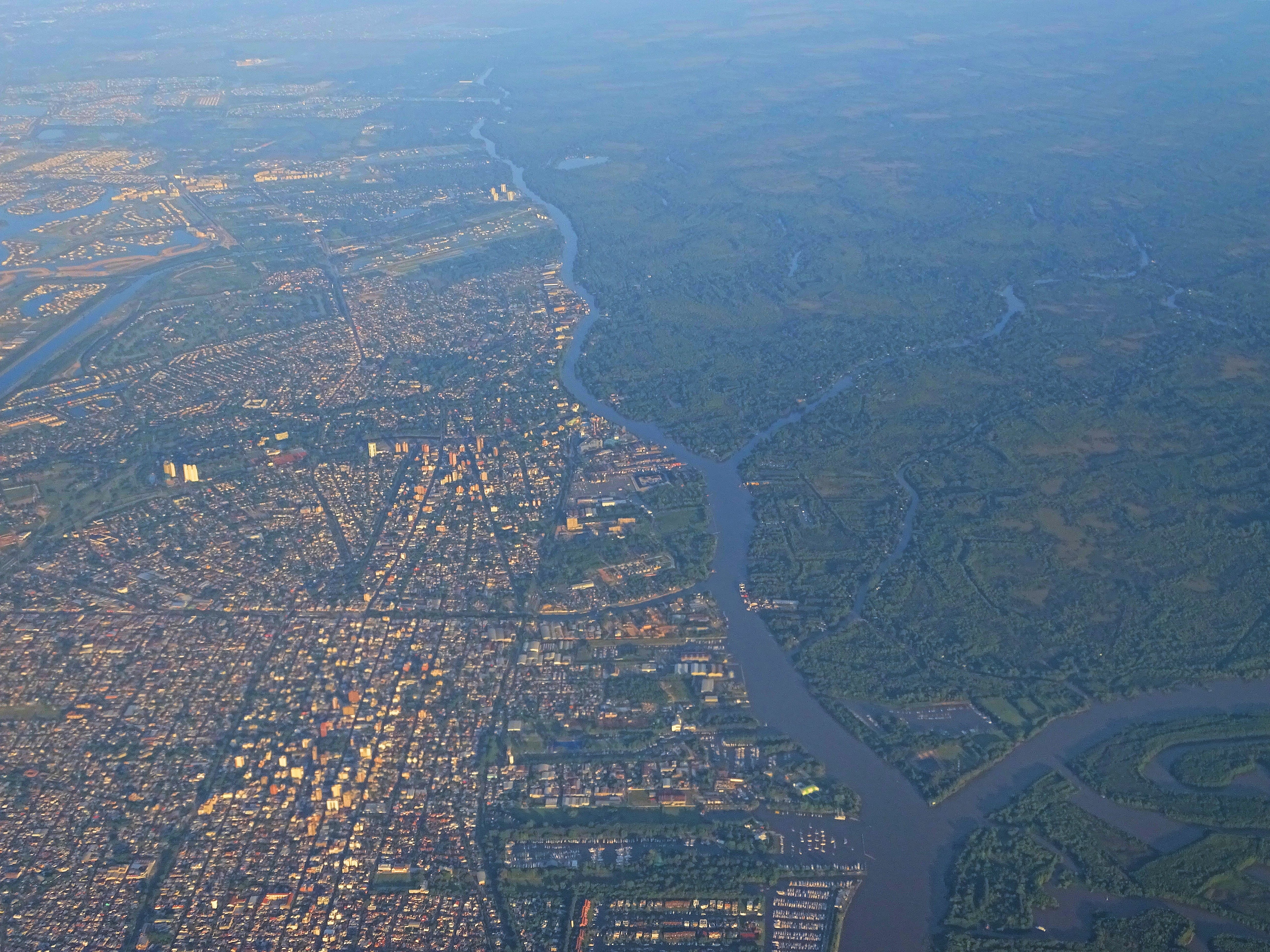
Luján River, marking the northern limit of urban Buenos Aires.

The Luján River (Spanish, Río Luján) runs from its source near Espora about 100 kilometres (62 mi) west of Buenos Aires, Argentina, to its outflow into the Río de la Plata north of the city. The first Megatherium fossil was found on the banks of the river in 1789.

== See also ==
- List of rivers of Argentina
