= Don Torcuato =

- Town
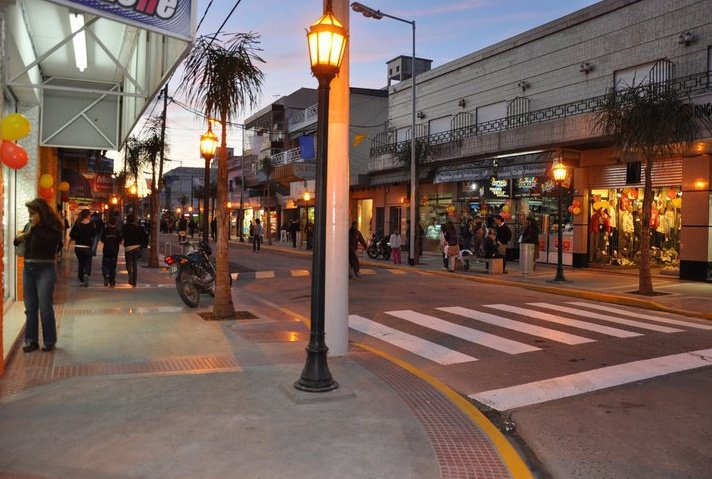
- Almirante Brown Commercial Center

- Location in Greater Buenos Aires
- Coordinates: 34°30′S 58°37′W
- Country: Argentina
- Province: Buenos Aires
- Partido: Tigre
- Elevation: 17 m (56 ft)

Population (2001 census [INDEC])
  - Total: 64,867
- CPA Base: B 1611
- Area code: +54 11

Don Torcuato is a town in the Tigre Partido of the urban agglomeration of Greater Buenos Aires, Argentina. It is named after Marcelo Torcuato de Alvear, ex-President of Argentina, as he had his ranch and residency there. Most of the streets are named after his immediate family and his governmental staff.

Don Torcuato has two train stations on the Belgrano Norte Line with direct connection to Buenos Aires, and also the nearby Pascual Palazzo highway, part of the Pan-American Highway. It formerly had a general aviation airfield, bearing the same name (Don Torcuato - ICAO:SADD), that was closed in January 2006.

== Climate ==
Climate data for Don Torcuato (1991–2000)
Month	Jan	Feb	Mar	Apr	May	Jun	Jul	Aug	Sep	Oct	Nov	Dec	Year
Record high °C (°F)	36.8 (98.2)	34.8 (94.6)	34.5 (94.1)	31.2 (88.2)	29.0 (84.2)	25.9 (78.6)	29.0 (84.2)	34.0 (93.2)	32.0 (89.6)	31.8 (89.2)	34.4 (93.9)	40.0 (104.0)	40.0 (104.0)
Mean daily maximum °C (°F)	28.6 (83.5)	27.5 (81.5)	26.5 (79.7)	21.8 (71.2)	18.8 (65.8)	15.2 (59.4)	14.2 (57.6)	17.5 (63.5)	18.6 (65.5)	21.6 (70.9)	24.6 (76.3)	28.1 (82.6)	21.9 (71.4)
Daily mean °C (°F)	23.5 (74.3)	22.3 (72.1)	21.2 (70.2)	16.9 (62.4)	13.7 (56.7)	10.7 (51.3)	9.4 (48.9)	11.9 (53.4)	13.8 (56.8)	16.8 (62.2)	19.5 (67.1)	22.5 (72.5)	16.8 (62.2)
Mean daily minimum °C (°F)	18.6 (65.5)	17.5 (63.5)	16.6 (61.9)	12.6 (54.7)	9.6 (49.3)	6.9 (44.4)	5.2 (41.4)	6.7 (44.1)	9.0 (48.2)	12.2 (54.0)	14.5 (58.1)	17.5 (63.5)	12.2 (54.0)
Record low °C (°F)	9.0 (48.2)	6.0 (42.8)	4.0 (39.2)	3.0 (37.4)	−1.8 (28.8)	−4.0 (24.8)	−4.5 (23.9)	−3.6 (25.5)	−0.9 (30.4)	0.0 (32.0)	2.6 (36.7)	5.0 (41.0)	−4.5 (23.9)
Average precipitation mm (inches)	107.8 (4.24)	86.7 (3.41)	79.4 (3.13)	116.8 (4.60)	99.8 (3.93)	62.2 (2.45)	46.6 (1.83)	43.7 (1.72)	49.5 (1.95)	108.1 (4.26)	108.9 (4.29)	132.6 (5.22)	1,042.2 (41.03)
Average precipitation days (≥ 0.1 mm)	7.2	6.1	6.2	9.8	6.0	7.4	5.7	5.1	6.8	8.1	9.0	8.0	85.4
Average relative humidity (%)	67.8	69.3	73.0	79.4	81.9	82.5	80.5	75.6	72.4	72.0	68.8	66.3	74.1
Mean monthly sunshine hours	306.9	251.4	244.9	180.0	182.9	141.0	167.4	201.5	201.0	229.4	267.0	294.5	2,667.9
Percentage possible sunshine	70.4	67.3	64.9	54.0	58.3	48.8	54.6	59.8	56.5	56.4	63.8	66.5	60.1
Source: Servicio Meteorológico Nacional

== Sports ==
Don Torcuato is known to be the home of Hindu Club, Buenos Aires most recent rugby tournament champion.
