= Diocese of San Isidro =

Catholic ecclesiastical territory

Diocese of San Isidro Dioecesis Sancti Isidori in Argentina Diócesis de San Isidro

Catholic
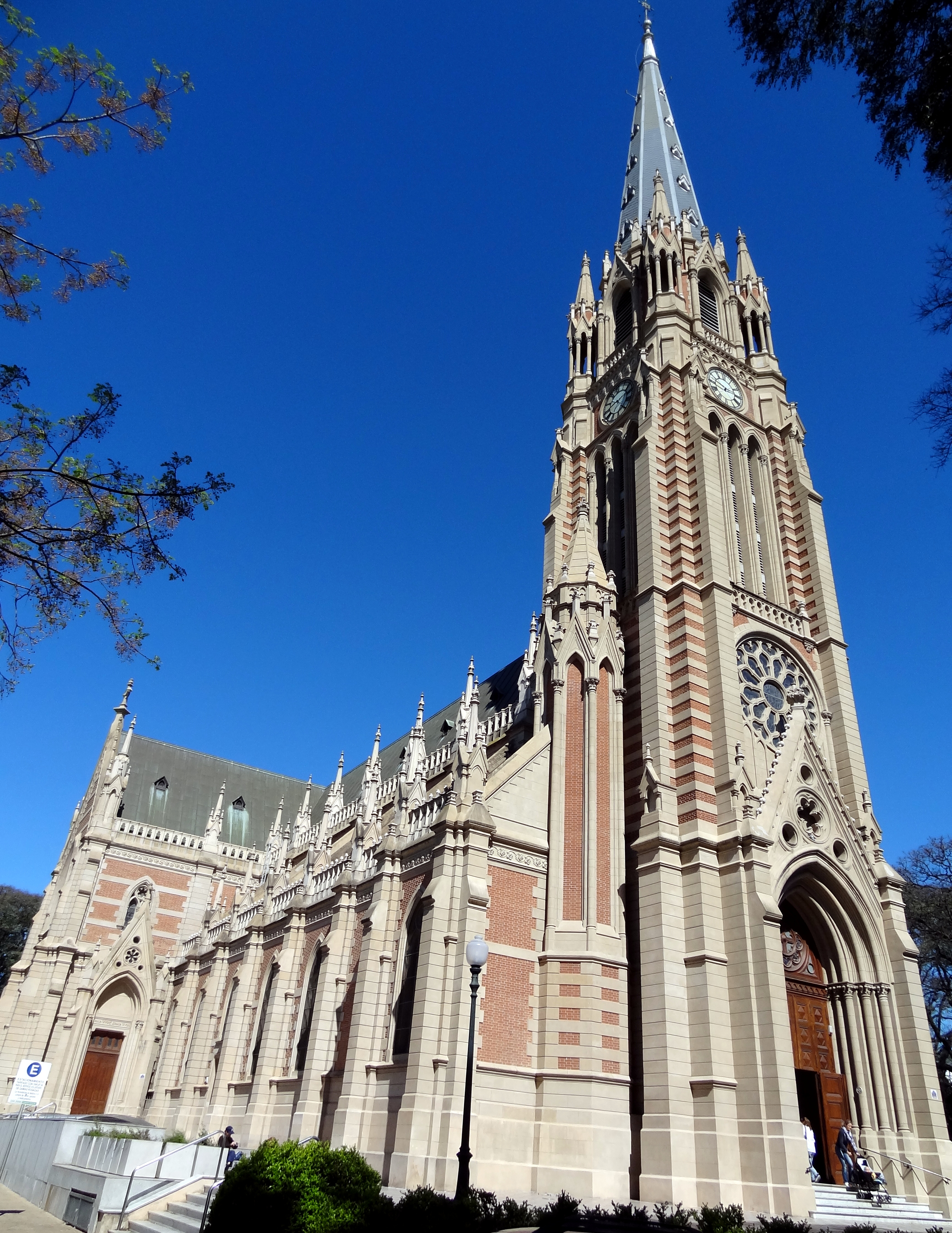
- Cathedral of St. Isidor the Worker

Location
- Country: Argentina
- Ecclesiastical province: Buenos Aires
- Metropolitan: Buenos Aires

Statistics
- Area: 1,379 km^{2} (532 sq mi)
- Population: Total; Catholics: (as of 2010); 1,145,000; 1,091,000 (95.3%)
- Parishes: 66

Information
- Denomination: Roman Catholic
- Rite: Roman Rite
- Established: 11 February 1957
- Cathedral: Cathedral of St Isidore the Laborer in San Isidoro
- Patron saint: St Isidore the Laborer

Current leadership
- Pope: Leo XIV
- Bishop: Óscar Vicente Ojea
- Metropolitan Archbishop: Mario Aurelio Poli
- Auxiliary Bishops: Guillermo Eduardo Caride, Raúl Pizarro
- Bishops emeritus: Jorge Casaretto

Website
- Website of the Diocese

The Diocese of San Isidro is an administrative division of the Roman Catholic Church in Argentina. It was established on 11 February 1957 and covers an area of 1,379 square kilometres (532 sq mi).

== Bishops ==
=== Ordinaries ===
- Antonio María Aguirre (1957–1985)
- Jorge Casaretto (1985–2011)
- Óscar Vicente Ojea (since 2011)

=== Coadjutor bishop ===
- Jorge Casaretto (1983–1985)

=== Auxiliary bishops ===
- Justo Oscar Laguna (1975–1980), appointed Bishop of Morón
- Martín Fassi (2014–2020), appointed Bishop of San Martín
- Guillermo Eduardo Caride (2018–
- Raúl Pizarro, elect (2020–

=== Other priests of this diocese who became bishops ===
- Carlos María Franzini, appointed Bishop of Rafaela in 2000
- Miguel Ángel D’Annibale, appointed Auxiliary Bishop of Río Gallegos in 2011
- Jorge Eduardo Scheinig, appointed Auxiliary Bishop of Mercedes-Luján in 2017
- Marcelo Fabián Mazzitelli, appointed Auxiliary Bishop of Mendoza in 2017
- Jorge Ignacio García Cuerva, appointed Auxiliary Bishop of Lomas de Zamora in 2017
