= Clandestine detention center (Argentina) =

Accommodation facility for detainees disappeared during the Dirty War

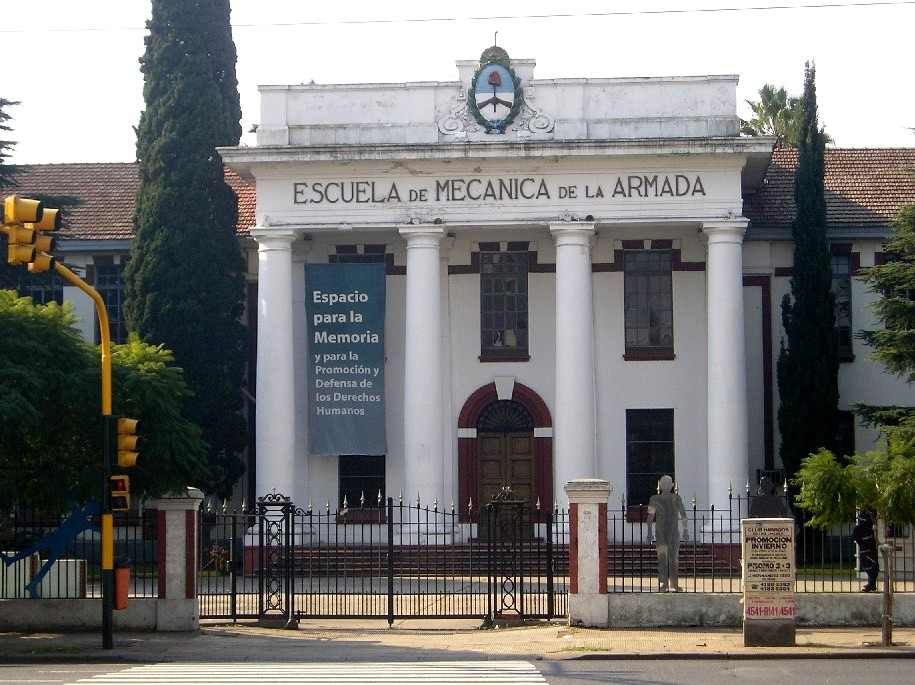
ESMA, a well-known clandestine detention center.

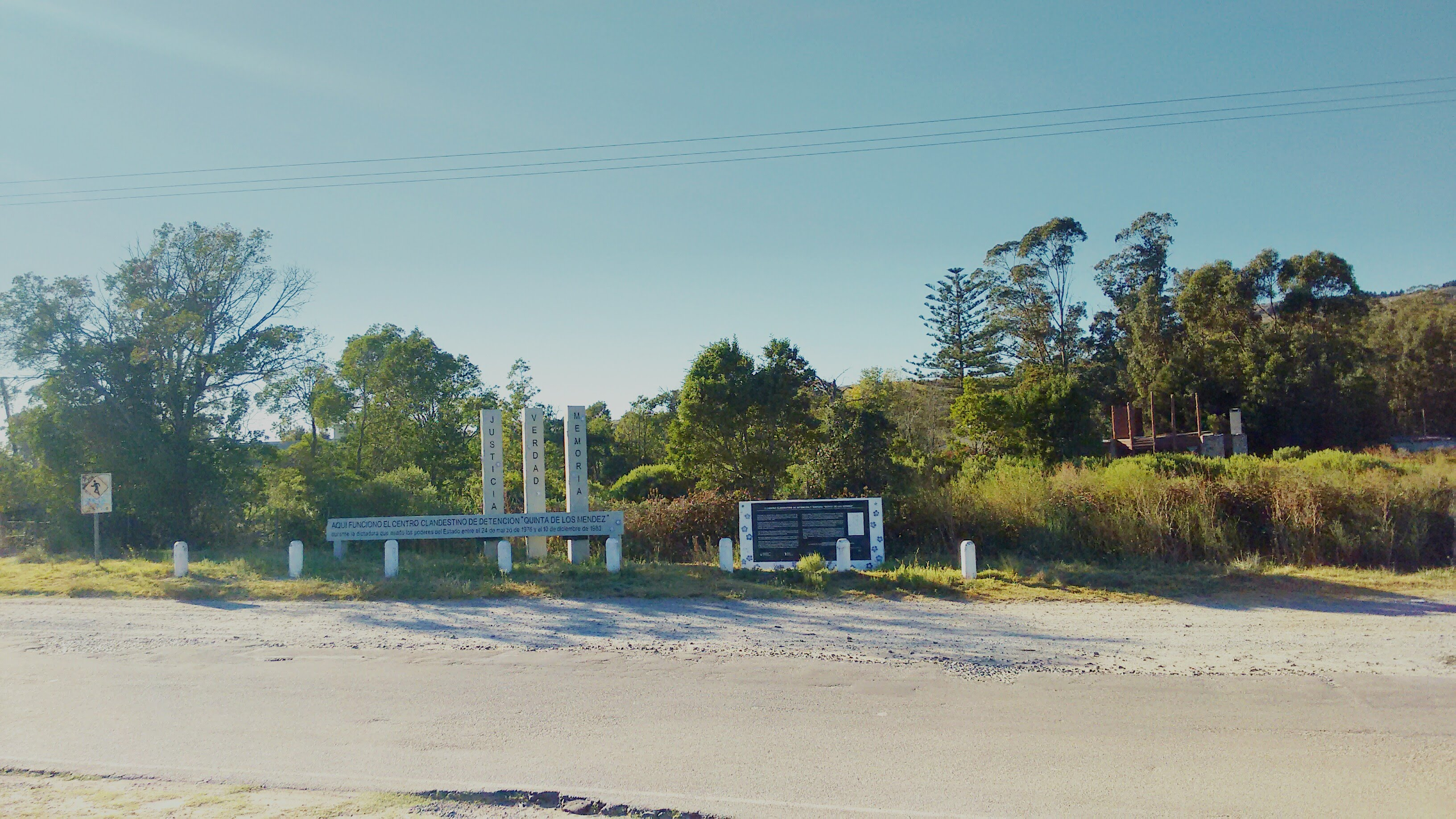
Memorial at the former detention center of Quinta de Mendez

The clandestine detention, torture and extermination centers (Note: Spanish: centros clandestinos de detención, tortura y exterminio (CCDTyE, CCDyE, or CCD)) were secret facilities (ie, black sites) used by the Armed, Security and Police Forces of Argentina to torture, interrogate, rape, illegally detain and murder people. The first ones were installed in 1975, during the constitutional government of Isabel Perón. Their number and use became generalized after the coup d'état of March 24, 1976, when the National Reorganization Process took power, to execute the systematic plan of enforced disappearance of people during the Dirty War. With the fall of the dictatorship and the assumption of the democratic government of Raúl Alfonsín on December 10, 1983, the CCDs ceased to function, although there is evidence that some of them continued to operate during the first months of 1984.

The Armed Forces classified the CCDs into two types:

- Definitive Place (in Spanish: Lugar Definitivo, LD): they had a more stable organization and were prepared to house, torture and murder large numbers of detainees.
- Temporary Place (in Spanish: Lugar Transitorio, LT): they had a precarious infrastructure and were intended to function as a first place to house the detainees-disappeared.

The plan of the de facto government, which exercised power in Argentina between March 24, 1976, and December 10, 1983, the clandestine centers were part of the plan to eliminate political dissidence. Similar operations were carried out in other countries in the region, with the express support of the US government, interested in promoting at all costs the control of communism and other ideological currents opposed to its side in the Cold War. According to data from 2006, there were 488 places used for the kidnapping of victims of State terrorism, plus another 65 in the process of revision that could enlarge the list. In 1976 there were as many as 610 CCDTyE, although many of them were temporary and circumstantial.

Argentina hosted over 520 clandestine detention centers during the course Dirty War. There was no standard for the location, torture methods, or leadership of detention centers, but they all operated on the purpose of political opposition, punishing prisoners suspected to be involved in socialism or other forms of political dissent. Little information is known about the true nature of the centers during their operation, due to the mass murder of inmates to maintain secrecy.

== General overview ==
The use of detention centers in the Dirty War, the period of state terrorism in Argentina between 1976 and 1983, caused immense fear for victims throughout the country. After being kidnapped and interrogated, the prisoners would be subjected to the harsh and overcrowded conditions of the various detention centers. Once the kidnapped were forced into detention, they effectively disappeared, becoming los desaparecidos. While there was no standard for detention centers, all of them incorporated a torture room. Physical torture was combined with emotional torture, with prisoners humiliated and dehumanized by the hands of the leaders; prisoners also lost basic human rights, unable to talk, shower, eat, and sleep.

The first CCD were installed in 1975, before the military coup of March 24, 1976. In that year La Escuelita in Famaillá (Tucumán) and El Campito (in Campo de Mayo, province of Buenos Aires) were already in operation. Also in 1975 a CCD operated in the Acindar plant in Villa Constitución, presided over by José Alfredo Martínez de Hoz, as part of the repressive structure organized to contain the strike declared by the UOM union in May of that year.

In 1976 there were 610 CCDs, but many of them were temporary and circumstantial. After the first months following the coup d'état, the number stabilized at 364 CCDs. In 1977 the number was reduced to 60. In 1978 there were 45 CC, and by 1979 the number of centers reached 7. In 1980 there were only two left: ESMA and El Campito (Campo de Mayo). In 1982 and 1983 ESMA was the only concentration camp still in use.

In Buenos Aires there were 60 centers, 59 in the province of Córdoba and 22 in Santa Fe. Five large centers were the axis of the whole system: ESMA and Club Atlético in the City of Buenos Aires; El Campito (Campo de Mayo) and El Vesubio in Greater Buenos Aires (Province of Buenos Aires); and Perla in Córdoba.

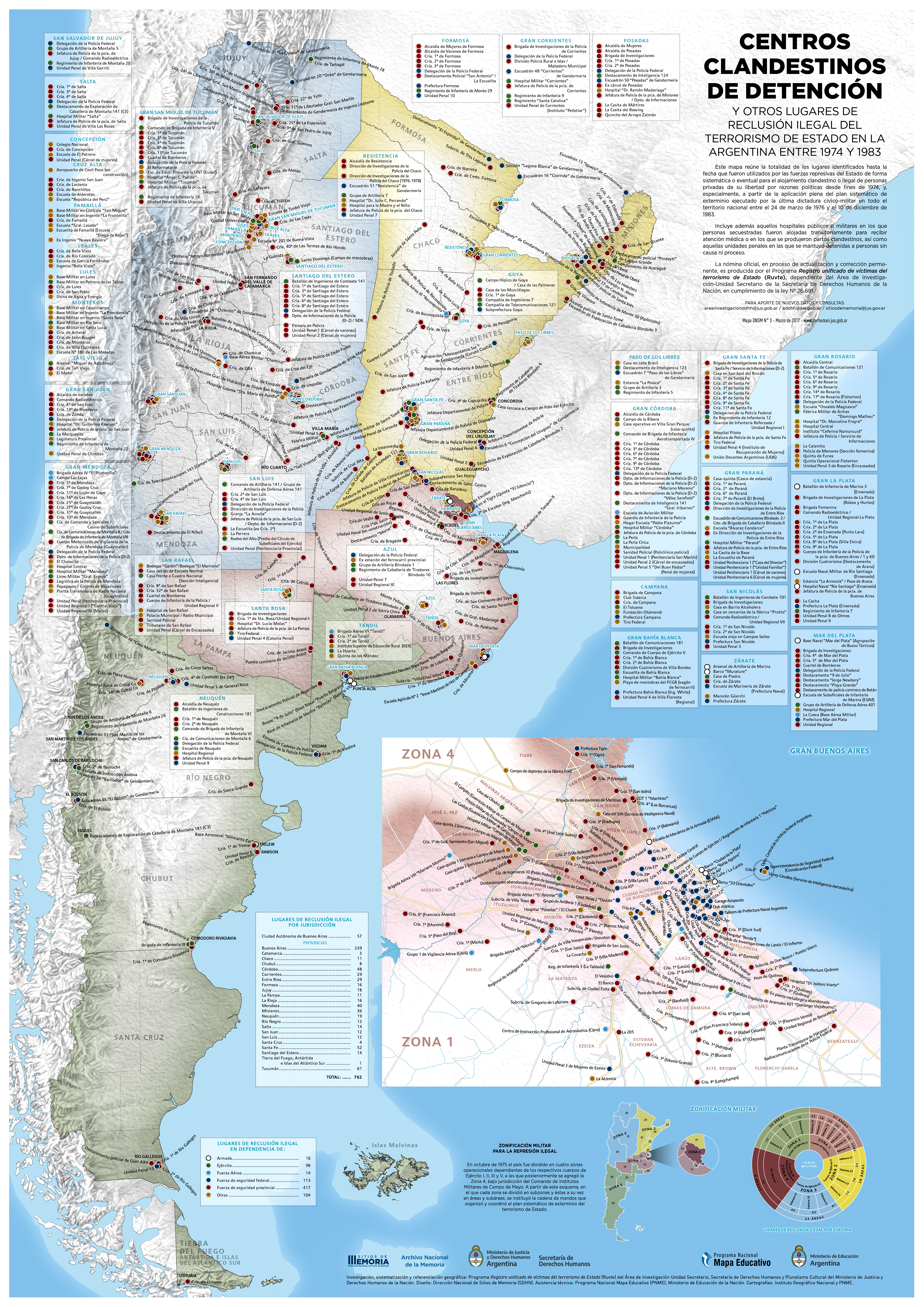
Map of geographical distribution of CCDs.

Despite their differences, the CCDs were organized with a similar structure and operating regime. All the CCDs had one or more torture rooms, large spaces to keep the disappeared in very precarious conditions, and a housing center for the torturers and guards. Almost all of them had some kind of medical service. In some cases there were permanent religious services for military personnel.

The Task Groups (in Spanish: Grupos de Tareas, GT, also known as "patotas") were in charge of carrying out the kidnappings, generally at night. The disappeared detainees were immediately taken to the corresponding CCD, where they were constantly hooded and handcuffed. They were immediately severely tortured and interrogated by the GT members themselves. The length of this initial period of torture varied considerably, but in general terms it could be considered to be between one and two months. After this initial period of torture-interrogation, they would be held for one to two months:

- Murder of the detainee-disappeared. In all the CCDs the same euphemism was used to refer to the murder of the detainee-disappeared: "the transfer" (in Spanish: "el traslado"). The methods used for the murder and disappearance of the corpses ranged from the so-called death flights, mass shootings, mass graves, "NN" graves, incineration of corpses, etc.
- Blanqueo: the detainee-disappeared was legalized and placed at the disposal of the National Executive Power. From 1980 onwards, this situation could lead to deportation and exile, through the use of the constitutional option (Art. 23), or to prosecution by military tribunals and prison sentences.
- Freedom.
- Continuity as a detainee-disappeared for various reasons (as slaves, collaborators, hostages, etc.).

During their permanence in the CCD, the detainees-disappeared were systematically dehumanized through various means: substitution of a number for their name, rape, animalization, humiliation, overcrowding, intolerable housing conditions, isolation, forced nudity, racism, antisemitism, homophobia, etc.

There was also a common policy and procedure for disappeared detainees who were pregnant. In this case, the murder was postponed and a clandestine childbirth took place with the suppression of the identity of the baby, who was handed over to people closely linked to the repressive system, and in some cases participants in the murder of the biological father and/or mother.

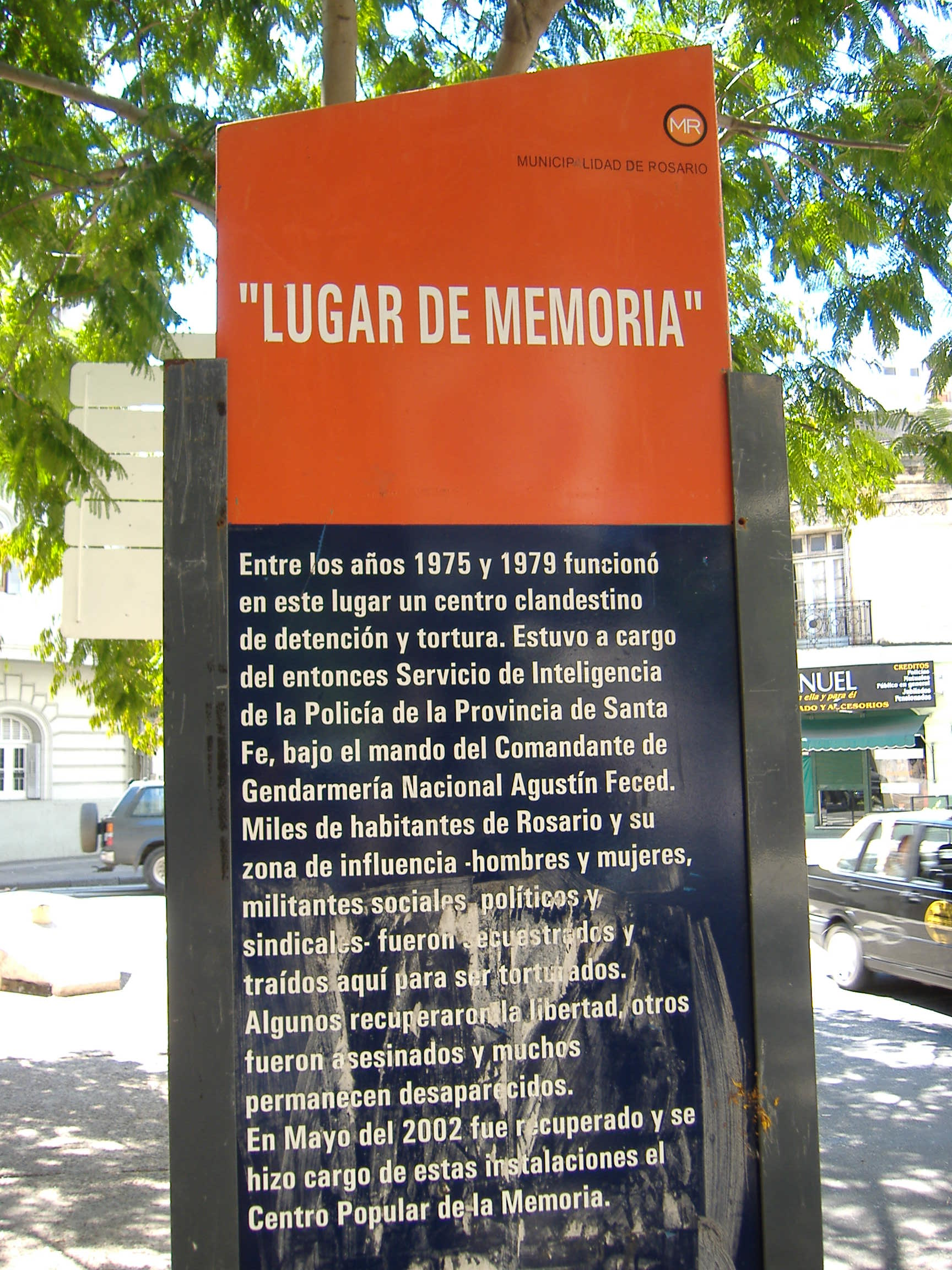
Historical memory.

On December 1, 1977, the newspaper Clarín published an article entitled "La ardua recuperación" (The hard recovery) in which it extensively describes the visit of a group of journalists, invited by the Army, to a detention center that it does not identify, where they interviewed several detainees, whom it does not identify either and that it describes as "extremists who surrendered voluntarily". The article is accompanied by a photograph in which a young woman can be seen with her back turned sitting at a table, with a caption that reads:

One of the detainees, in one of the reading rooms of the establishment, where they serve their sentence.

Clarín never explained the details of the article, nor did it make itself available to the courts to verify whether the persons interviewed were disappeared, as well as which was the detention center visited by its journalists and whether the military officers involved may have been committing crimes against humanity. Researcher Marcelo Borrelli of the University of Buenos Aires analyzed the publication and maintains that "it seemed to have been written by the military intelligence services". He details the discursive mechanisms of the newspaper to praise the system of reclusion of the "extremists" who surrendered voluntarily and the distinction between "the two youths", on the one hand the "lost" youth who had political concerns and affective traumas of family origin, and on the other hand the apolitical youth, entirely dedicated to excel in their profession.

At the end of the Dirty War and a change in government, prisoners were released on the street, blindfolded, with the torturers' identities kept a secret.

=== Torture ===
Beginning as early as 1976, people suspected of being involved in political opposition to the Argentinian regime were kidnapped from homes and public places and brought to detention centers. Once these prisoners were brought to the respective camp, methods varied towards the type and severity of the torture. A New York Times article written on October 4, 1976, shares the experience of a victim who was blindfolded, hit, and forced to be nude. These initial conditions were meant to scare the victims into revealing socialist secrets. This was followed with a process of interrogation and more intrusive torture methods. Accounts of sexual abuse, cigarette burns, and electric shocks were common during these eight years of victimization. Methods as extreme as throwing prisoners out of airplanes were employed to terrify victims witnessing the executions.

As more political opponents were captured and tortured, there was no government opposition to the human rights violations that were transpiring. Most victims and their families remained silent to avoid further persecution. However, there was a movement called the Mothers of Plaza de Mayo (Las Madres de la Plaza de Mayo) that began in 1977, a year after the beginning of the Dirty War. These mothers marched along the Argentinian government, participating in nonviolent protests to fight for the return of their children. Unlike the tangible torture that the kidnapped felt, the pain of the mothers in this movement was expressed through their actions. In many ways, this can be seen as a form of torture, the torture that the Mothers could not have their beloved children back in their lives. Some mothers would protest for the rest of their lives, refusing to give up on their child's memory.

==== US involvement in Argentina ====
The United States, through its covert CIA and other intelligence agencies, has declassified certain documents that prove their knowledge of Operation Condor during the 1970s. Operation Condor is an umbrella operation of the CIA, in which six Latin American countries banded together to remove all potential political opponents in the Southern Cone. The Dirty War connects as a specific event to the larger Operation Condor.

In a conversation between Secretary of State Henry Kissinger and many of his colleagues, one of them argues that the Argentinian junta was overdoing the control it had over its citizens. Kissinger remarks that the treatment and policy of detention centers are, in fact, good for United States interests while also stating that this junta will need "a little encouragement from [the United States]" to pursue its efforts.

Kissinger spoke openly to the leaders of Operation Condor and supported their efforts; he believed that "the quicker you succeed, the better." Kissinger shows the tolerance of the United States regarding the pain and torture of other people in other nations held both inside and outside the detention centers. He has also been described as giving the "green light" to the torturers. Many of the leaders of America during this time had a similar train of thought.

Most of the American efforts in Argentina at the time dealt with the economy, largely ignoring the issues on the ground level. Between the lack of jobs and abundant refugees flooding into Argentina, America believed its duty was to control and maintain the balance of the economy. There was little recognition of the treatment of Dirty War victims, as it was left to the side to deal with the "real, pressing issues" of the time in the opinion of the United States government.

==== US inaction in Argentina ====
In supporting the Argentine regime, the US remained silent in the face of human rights violations. The US government published a list of American people who were either dead or disappeared in 1978. However, no major American opposition movements followed this revelation. A year later, the US sent the Inter-American Commission on Human Rights (IACHR) to Argentina to investigate the impact of human rights abuses on the nation as a whole. By the time the Commission arrived in 1979, the US had decreed that terrorism was not an issue in this area of the world.

Kissinger consistently commented on the Dirty War without acting to change the situation. The US Embassy in Argentina confirmed that 80-90% of the clandestine detention centers were destroyed by 1979 when the IACHR traveled to Argentina. Two embassy staff remarked that this progress was satisfactory because most of the camps had been removed. Yet, the knowledge that most of the camps were no longer functioning raises the question of where the victims of these centers went. A large percentage of the victims that were once "housed" in the destroyed detention centers were confirmed to be disappeared, dead, or transferred to the small percentage of camps which remained in operation.

== City of Buenos Aires ==
=== Former ESMA ===
The most famous clandestine detention center of the Process was at the Escuela Superior de Mecánica de la Armada (ESMA). Located in the officers' casino of that institution of the Argentine Navy, in the northern area of the City of Buenos Aires (Núñez), on Avenida del Libertador at 8200 (34°32′18″S 58°27′49″W), approximately two blocks from the 1978 World Cup Stadium; it operated from March 1976 to November 1983.

It ultimately depended on Admiral Eduardo Massera, and was directly in charge of Task Group 3.3.2, led by Rear Admiral Rubén Chamorro and Captain "Tigre" Acosta. Other famous repressors who were part of it were Alfredo Astiz, Ricardo Miguel Cavallo, Antonio Pernías, Adolfo Scilingo, Juan Antonio Azic, Adolfo Donda, Manuel García Tallada, Jorge Luis Magnacco, Oscar Montes, Jorge Rádice, Juan Carlos Rolón, Jorge Enrique Perrén (son) and Ernesto Frimón Weber.

ESMA became the political power base of the Navy and in particular of Massera; it was closed in November 1983, after the elections in which Raúl Alfonsín won and a few days before the constitutional authorities took office.

By the time it was shut down, over 5000 people had been tortured there. Only 150 victims had survived the center at the end of the Dirty War. The torture center split families immediately upon their arrival, murdering the mothers as quickly as possible. From there, victims would be moved to the basement, where most of the torture occurred, to have their pictures taken. Intense interrogations and torture plans made on an individual basis would ensue.

On March 24, 2004, President Néstor Kirchner and the Head of Government of the City of Buenos Aires, Aníbal Ibarra, signed an Agreement between the National State and the Autonomous City of Buenos Aires for the construction of the Espacio Memoria y Derechos Humanos (Memory and Human Rights Space) on the site, which was registered under No. 8/04. The decision was announced in a massive act, in which the doors of the Escuela de Mecánica de la Armada were opened. In the present-day, the ESMA is used as a memorial for the human rights violations during the war.

=== El Olimpo ===
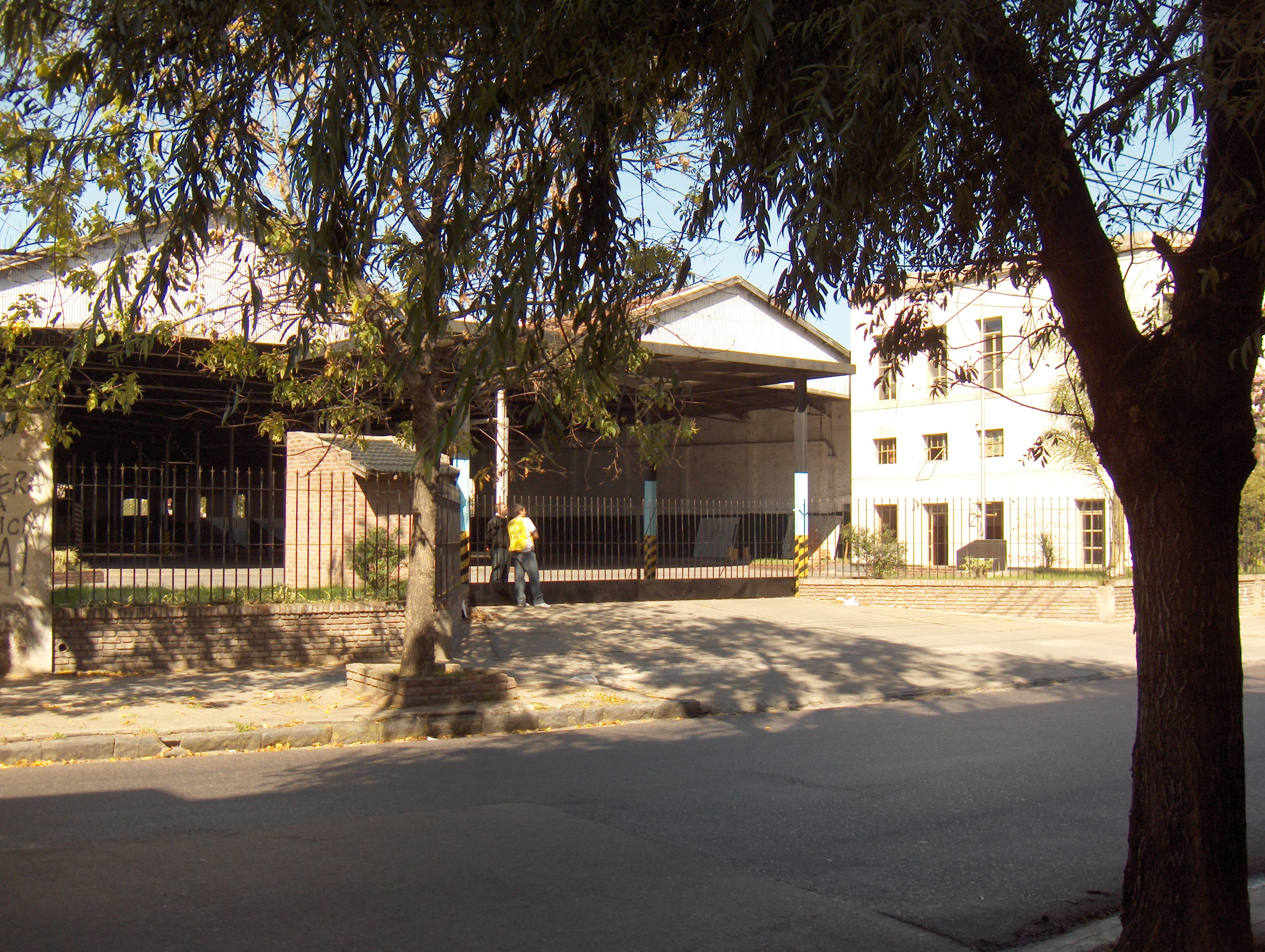
"El Olimpo" operated between 1978 and 1979.

El Olimpo was a clandestine detention center located in the west of the city of Buenos Aires, in the Vélez Sársfield barrio (Floresta neighborhood). The center had a sign at the entrance that read "Welcome to the Olympus of the Gods. The Centurions". The center only operated for six months, from August 1978 to January 1979, but 700 detainees were housed there, of which 50 survived.

This clandestine center depended on Guillermo Suarez Mason (nicknamed the butcher of Olympus), commander of the I Army Corps of the Argentine Army. The person in charge of the camp was Army Major Guillermo Minicucci, and he was also in charge of officers of the Argentine Federal Police such as Julio Simón (nicknamed "el Turco Julián") and Juan Antonio del Cerro (nicknamed "Colores").

The building was a shed used as a colectivo terminal until the beginning of the National Reorganization Process when it was expropriated by the Armed Forces. At the beginning of 1978 the cells were constructed to house the detainees, which were built by detainees who were transferred from other centers. There they also stored the thefts made during the kidnappings and had two torture rooms, with reinforced electrical wiring.

The building had a capacity of 150 but housed 500 people at its peak. The operators used the operation room as the torture site to mock the victims. It is specifically known for its horrific interrogation methods of those accused of being associated with a rival political position.

With the arrival of democracy, the building passed into the hands of the Argentine Federal Police and was converted into an automobile verification center. The property was declared a historic site by Law 1197 of the Legislature of the City of Buenos Aires.

It is currently used as a space for remembrance, and thus, many excursions to this site are made by schools to remember those victims who suffered during their stay in this Clandestine Center. Currently this site is mostly modified and many of the cells are no longer there, but its foundations are there to identify how the structure used to be.

=== Club Atlético ===
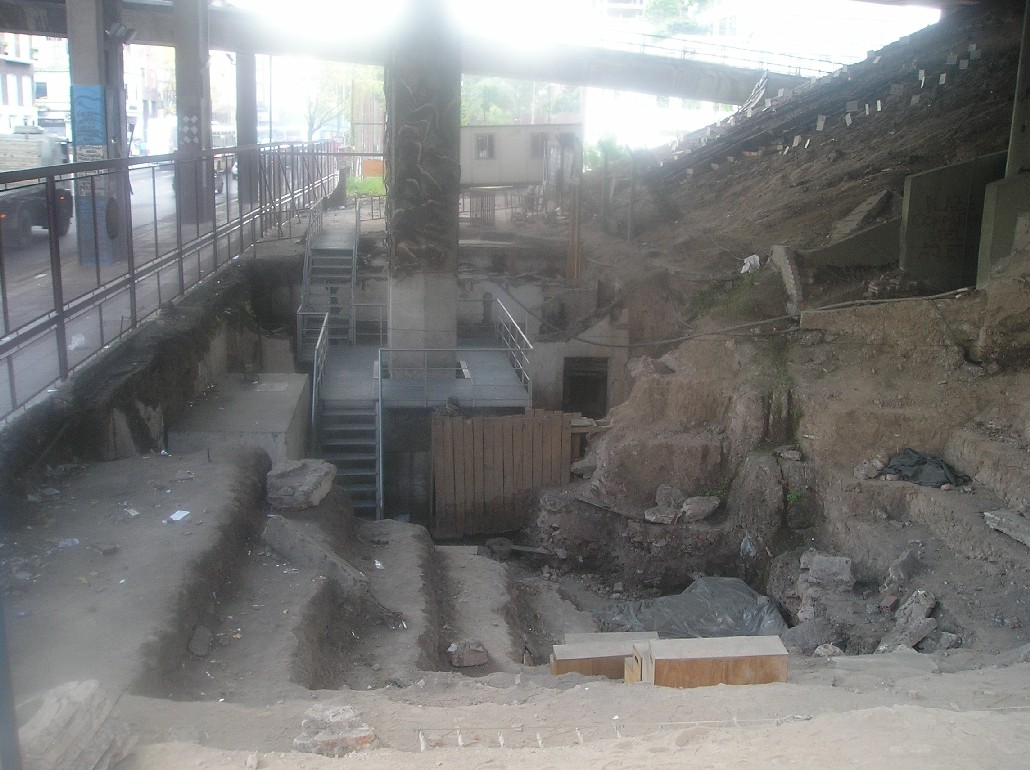
Excavation of the former clandestine detention center Club Atlético, Paseo Colón 1200, Buenos Aires City.

Club Atletico was a clandestine detention center located in the south of Buenos Aires, near the neighborhood of La Boca at 1200 Paseo Colon Avenue. It was named as such because it was located in the vicinity of the Club Atlético Boca Juniors. Serving as a site where socialists were tortured for opposing the Argentinian regime, Club Atlético housed up to 1,500 victims at its peak, despite having a maximum capacity of around 200. Similar to the ESMA, the detention center used its basement as a torture chamber. Club Atlético formed part of a larger network of covert operations that contributed to the detention, torture, and extermination of accused dissenters.

It was a public building that was demolished to build the 25 de Mayo highway. Its ruins were later found and the Government of Buenos Aires has begun to carry out the necessary excavations to recover it as a place of memory.

=== Automotores Orletti ===
Automotores Orletti was the name given to a clandestine detention and torture center in Buenos Aires, Argentina.

Located in the Floresta neighborhood of Buenos Aires, it operated during the military dictatorship of 1976–1983. There, the Argentine Army coordinated the repression with the Uruguayan Army. The Superintendence of the Federal Police directed the interrogations.

In December 1975, General René Otto Paladino, one of the founders of the Argentine Anticommunist Alliance (Triple A) was put in charge of the Secretariat of Intelligence (SIDE), it was decided to create a base so that Aníbal Gordon's gang could operate without attracting attention.

Some 300 people were kidnapped and tortured there, many of whom are still missing today, and others, such as the actor Luis Brandoni and his wife Martha Bianchi, who only suffered a few hours of the horror of the place.

Orletti became the center of regional operations within the framework of the so-called "Operation Condor" and there Gordon's gang coordinated tasks with repressors from Chile, Paraguay, Brazil, Bolivia and Uruguay. The victims were tortured, extorted, robbed and murdered, only to disappear. Fear was used to create an environment where the prisoner would have to admit to all political dissent they had committed. This resulted in many false confessions of political opposition to avoid being murdered.

Today it has become a museum dedicated to the memory of the tortured and disappeared.

=== Virrey Cevallos ===
Virrey Cevallos was a clandestine detention and torture center operated by the Air Force Intelligence Service and composed of three united housing units in the neighborhood of Montserrat. It was used as a base to plan kidnappings, torture and house disappeared detainees, generally for short periods of time. It is estimated that, since 1977, approximately 100 disappeared detainees were held there.

The Virrey Cerallos, in the neighborhood of Monserrat, was known for its 'efficient' torture methods in a garage-like building. The center's operations were unusually public, showing how Argentinian officials were able to violate human rights at the time.

=== Coordinación Federal ===
or Superintendencia de Seguridad Federal (former Coordinación Federal) was one of the most active CCD's in Buenos Aires, since 1974 and especially after the military coup. The methods of the Federal Coordination were coined by Commissioner Alberto Villar, creator within the police of the Infantry Guard Corps. Its most recognized chief was Army Colonel Alejandro Arias Duval. Since the end of 1975, Task Group 2, which depended on General Suarez Mason, settled on the third and fourth floors of the building. The core group of repressors who acted in this CCD combined members of the extreme right-wing Peronism with high-ranking officials of the dictatorship. In 1975, before becoming Minister of the Interior of the dictatorship, General Harguindeguy was head of the Federal Police and as such, responsible for the formation of GT-2. In the last years of the dictatorship, to hide its activities, it was called the Superintendence of Federal Security, and in democracy it became Metropolitan Security. The detainees did not appear on any legal list of persons deprived of their freedom and many were summarily executed without trial. One of the best known cases was in July 1976 when dozens of people were murdered in retaliation for an attack committed by the guerrillas against the Federal Coordination building. Part of the bodies went to the morgue and some 30 bodies appeared in what was later known as the Fatima massacre.

In 2017 twelve policemen were arrested and charged for crimes against humanity committed in this CCD.

=== Garage Azopardo ===
In 650 Azopardo Street in Buenos Aires operated the CCD "Garage Azopardo", which was part of the repressive circuit Azopardo-Atlético-Banco-Vesubio-Olimpo, under the orbit of the First Army Corps. The Automotive Maintenance Service of the Federal Security Superintendence operated there.

Unlike other detention centers, Garaje Azopardo used forced labour and made victims illegally transmit passports to friends of the Argentinian government. The Garage has been accused of only giving victims one meal a day.

In 2012 a signage plaque with the historical reference was unveiled. Very close to the "Garage Azopardo" another important CCD operated during the years of the dictatorship, sadistically baptized by the repressors themselves as "Club Atlético".

== Greater Buenos Aires ==
=== El Banco ===
El Banco was the denomination given to a CCD that operated between late 1977 and mid-1978 and was located very close to the intersection of the Ricchieri Highway and the Camino de Cintura, a few meters from Bridge 12. The center was located in facilities of the Bonaerense Police and was opened when the construction works of the 25 de Mayo highway made necessary the demolition of the Club Atlético, which was located at the intersection of this highway and Paseo Colon Avenue in the city of Buenos Aires. Part of the prisoners of the Athletic Club were taken to El Banco.

Repressors belonging to the intelligence services of the Federal Police, Task Group 1, 2, 3 and 4 and the FTE operated there. It had about 50 dungeons, which the repressors called "tubes" and three torture rooms. There was also a "leonera" or collective cell.

Currently the XI Women's Brigade of the Police of the province of Buenos Aires operates there.

=== El Campito ===
El Campito was the main concentration camp used by the army. It was also known as "Los Tordos". It operated in Campo de Mayo (San Miguel, Province of Buenos Aires), the most important military garrison of Argentina between 1975 and 1982. Some 5,000 detainees passed through it. Only 43 survived.

Campo de Mayo is a large military area of 5000 ha, 30 km from the center of the city of Buenos Aires. It is located near the cities of San Miguel, Villa de Mayo and Don Torcuato, in the area where Provincial Route 8 and Provincial Route 23 cross (34°32′09″S 58°39′44″W), which border it. In the Military Hospital of Campo de Mayo there was a system of clandestine deliveries.

From March 1976 to 1980, four CCD operated in Campo de Mayo: the Campito, "La Casita" or "Las Casitas", the Prisión Militar de Encausados, and the Hospital Militar.

The center was under the control of the Command of Military Institutes, which at the time of its operation was in charge of Generals Santiago Omar Riveros, José Montes, Cristino Nicolaides and Reynaldo Benito Bignone. The Campito was directly directed by lieutenant colonel Jorge Vosso, while major doctor Julio César Caserotto was head of the Maternity Service of the Military Hospital.

The Campo de Mayo Hospital Militar has been detected as one of the centers where clandestine childbirths of prisoners were carried out, to proceed later to the kidnapping of the children, the suppression of their identity and their delivery, usually to military couples who could not have children. In many cases the "adoptive parents" have been participants in the murders of the biological fathers and mothers of the children.

One of the repressors of the "Campito", former sergeant Víctor Ibáñez, confessed and described its characteristics at length. His testimony is included in the book Campo Santo, by Fernando Almirón (1999). In one part of the book Ibáñez declares:

When I entered the place, the first thing that struck me was the image of all those people like that, locked up in there. The mattresses, lying on the red tiled floor, with the headboards leaning against the walls. Side by side, in a row that went all the way around the length of the shed. All the windows were covered with green blankets that kept out the sunlight. The lamps were always on, you never knew when it was day and when it was night (1). On top of each one of those old wool mattresses, with striped cotin, sat the detainees. Hooded, with their hands tied in front with a rope and in absolute silence. (Almirón 1999)

Since the establishment of democracy in 1983, projects have been presented to establish an industrial center there, create centers for tertiary and university studies, maintain it as an ecological reserve, etc.

=== El Vesubio ===
El Vesubio was a clandestine detention center used by the Army that was located in Gran Buenos Aires, in the Partido de La Matanza, near the intersection of the Camino de Cintura with the Riccheri Highway that leads to Ministro Pistarini International Airport (Ezeiza International Airport), on land belonging to the Federal Penitentiary Service. "Empresa El Vesubio" was the code name used by the repressive forces to refer to it. It began to operate in 1975 and was used by the Triple A, before the coup d'état, under the name of "La Ponderosa" and ceased to operate in 1978. Among the disappeared and survivors, at least 400 people were detained there. Many of them were transferred from the "Sheraton", another clandestine center located in the neighborhood of Villa Insuperable, where the local police station functioned and still functions.

It was in Military Zone No. 1, under the jurisdiction of the I Army Corps under the command of Major General Guillermo Suárez Mason, who periodically visited the camp, and directly in charge of the Intelligence Gathering Center (CRI) of the Infantry Regiment 3 of La Tablada, under the command of Colonel Federico Minicucci. Colonels Juan Bautista Sasiaiñ and Franco Luque also operated there. The chief of El Vesubio was Major Pedro Alberto Durán Sáenz.

El Vesubio ceased to operate and its buildings were demolished in 1978 due to the visit of the Inter-American Commission on Human Rights.

In 2014, the work "30 000 MUNDOS" was inaugurated on the land occupied by the center as a tribute to the disappeared detainees.

=== La Mansión Seré ===
The Seré Mansion, also known as Quinta de Seré or Atila, was a clandestine detention center (CCD) operating in an old two-floor house located on Blas Pareras street, on the border between the towns of Castelar and Ituzaingó, in the Morón Partido, Buenos Aires Province.

Between 1977 and 1978, the place served as a clandestine detention center under the jurisdiction of the Air Force with the assistance of the Castelar Bonaerense Police.

The film 'Chronicle of an Escape' (2006) directed by Adrián Caetano recreates the true story of the escape from this center by Claudio Tamburrini, Daniel Rusomano, Guillermo Fernández, and Carlos García.

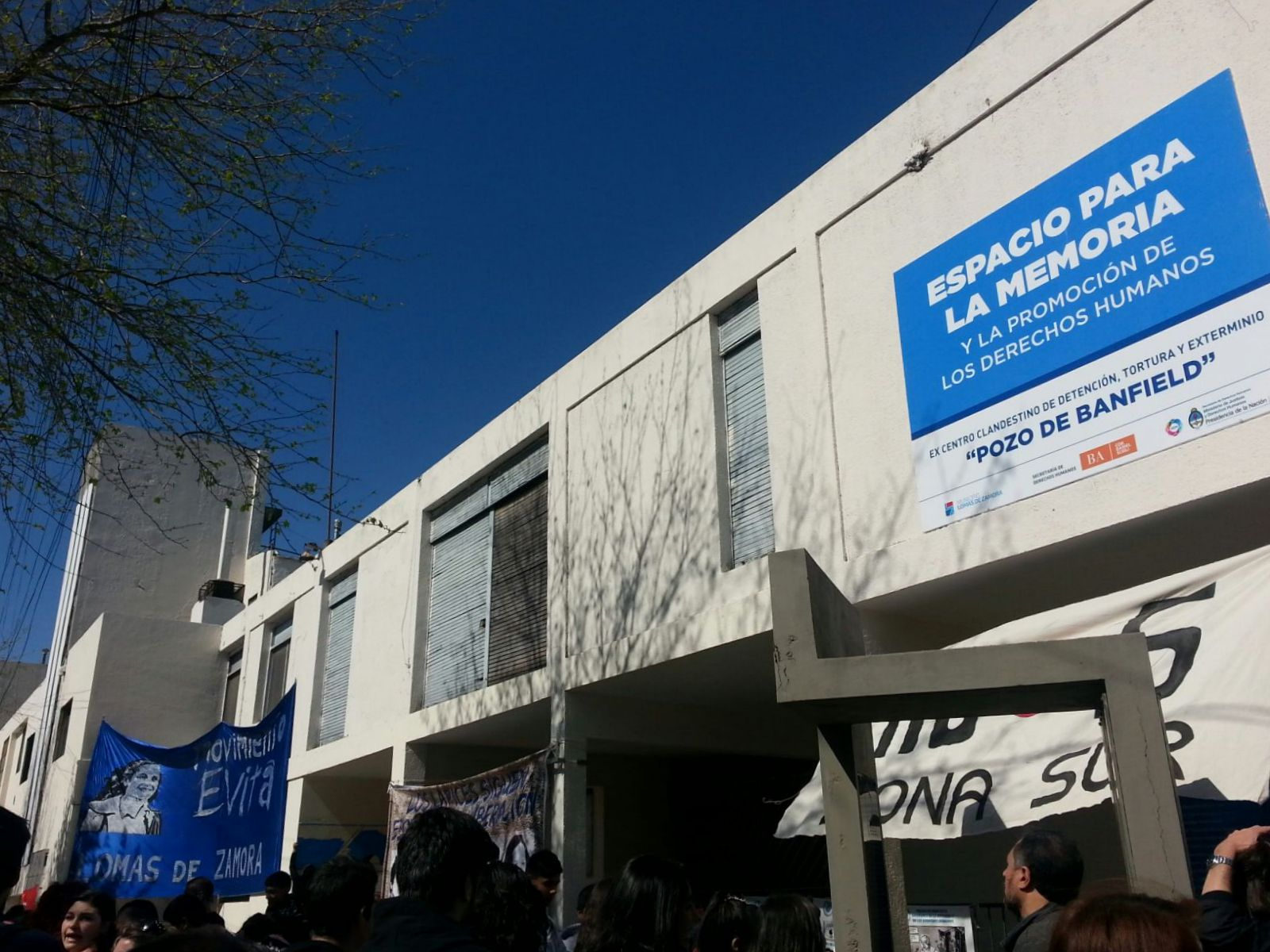
Pozo de Banfield, during an event for the 39th anniversary of the Night of the Pencils.

Since the year 2000, the House of Memory and Life and the Human Rights Department of the Municipality of Morón have operated in this place.

=== Pozo de Banfield ===
The 'Pozo de Banfield,' originally created as a branch of the Banfield Investigations Brigade, became a clandestine detention center operating between November 1974 and October 1978. It had the particularity of starting its operations during Isabel Perón's constitutional government, prior to the 1976 coup d'état.

In 2006, following requests from social organizations, the space was handed over to the provincial Human Rights department to build a Museum of Memory.

=== Pozo de Quilmes ===
The 'Pozo de Quilmes' or 'Chupadero Malvinas' was another clandestine detention center operating between August 1975 and January 1979. 251 people were held captive there, some kidnapped under the Operation Condor.

=== 'El Infierno' of Avellaneda ===
'El Infierno' was named by the head of the Buenos Aires Provincial Police, Ramón Camps, and operated in the Lanús Investigations Brigade, under Miguel Etchecolatz. This center functioned from 1976 to 1978, and it is estimated that around 330 people passed through it, including labor activists. Most of them disappeared, and others were identified in section 134 of the municipal cemetery.

The headquarters of the Regional Unit II of the Lanús Investigations Brigade (URIIBIL) operated there, and the local authorities were Commissioners Bruno Trevisán and Rómulo Ferranti, sentenced to three and four years in prison for the crimes of 'abuse and severity' against the Iaccarino businessmen. Around 200 police officers worked here between 1976 and 1979, but being an investigations brigade, many of them wore plainclothes. There were also military personnel, and together, they formed the task groups.

On the 40th anniversary of the last civic-military coup in Argentina, 'El Infierno' was expropriated and transformed into a 'Municipal Space of Memory'. A year earlier, it had been marked at an event with political and local human rights organizations. Currently, the Human Rights Secretariat of the Municipality of Avellaneda operates there.

The following people were 'seen' in this CCD: Enrique Barry, Horacio Reimer, Héctor Pérez, José Rizzo, Horacio Lafleur, Luis Jaramillo, Carlos Alberto Fernández, Pablo Musso, Víctor Venura, Diana Wlichky, Mario Salerno, and Ricardo Chidichimo. Among the disappeared are: Carlos Daniel Saramaga, Esteban Santos, José Agustín Quinteros, Inés Pedemonte, Carlos Ochoa, Jorge Mendoza Calderón, Carlos Hodlt, Graciela Jurado, Gustavo Fernández Galán, Bonifacio Díaz, Victoria Borrelli, Alejo Avelino, Marta Alonso, Raúl Vassena, and Daniel Scimia. Additionally, three 'NN' (no names) are registered. Survivors include: Oscar Solís, Eduardo Castellanos, Gladys Rodríguez, Nilda Eloy, Corina Joly, Horacio Matoso, Haydee Lampugnani, Adolfo Paz, and Gustavo Fernández.

In March 2014, the 'Municipal Archive of Collective and Popular Memory' of Avellaneda was presented. The first booklets of the 'Memory Book' are dedicated to all the criminal activities of this CCD.

== Buenos Aires Province ==
In the province, there were two hundred and thirty clandestine detention centers.

=== Ford Motor Argentina Plant ===
A CCD operated within the premises of the Ford plant in General Pacheco, where company personnel were involved in torture and interrogations during the last dictatorship, a case emblematic of corporate responsibility in State terrorism crimes.

=== La Plata Penitentiary No. 9 ===
Penitentiary No. 9 was one of the penal institutions that housed the most political prisoners during Argentina's last civic-military dictatorship and also functioned as a Clandestine Detention Center (CCD), where 30 people were murdered-disappeared".

=== Naval Infantry Battalion No. 3 (BIM 3), La Plata ===
The Naval Infantry Battalion No. 3 housed a clandestine detention and torture center during the dictatorship, coordinated by Task Force 5 of the Argentine Republic Navy, which gathered repressive resources in the area of La Plata, Berisso, and Ensenada. The actions of TF 5 were verified to involve 'the identification, through intelligence tasks, of those workers who had some kind of involvement in union or guild activities', subsequently leading to their abduction.

In 2015, Commander Jorge Alberto Errecaborde of Task Group 5, José Casimiro Fernández Carró of BIM 3, and Operations and Intelligence Chief Roberto Eduardo Fernando Guitian of BIM 3 were sentenced to life imprisonment.

=== Campana's Federal Shooting Range ===
The clandestine detention center (CCD) at Campana's Federal Shooting Range was occupied by the Armed Forces a day after the military coup of 1976 and began to be used as a place for the abduction and torture of individuals persecuted for their political and social activism, within the framework of the systematic plan of terror and extermination imposed by Argentina's last civic-military dictatorship.

=== Monte Peloni ===
In a house at Monte Peloni, on Route 226, which connects Olavarría with Mar del Plata or Tandil, a CCD operated where the Army tortured and held numerous young people from the area between 1976 and 1978.

=== Quinta de Méndez ===
This refers to an estate located in the area of Los Laureles, on the outskirts of the city of Tandil in the Buenos Aires Province, at the current streets Juan Manuel de Rosas and Scavini. The property belonged to brothers Julio and Emilio Méndez. The place was temporarily transferred to the Command of Subzone 12, under the command of General Alfredo Oscar Saint Jean, overseeing Area 121, led by Lieutenant Colonel Julio Tommasi.

=== La Huerta ===
It was part of a repressive circuit in combination with other clandestine detention centers in the region belonging to the so-called Subzone XII. It was located at the intersection of Route 226 and the road to the Tandil Military Air Base.

=== ISER (Rural Education Higher Institute) ===
Known as Sans Souci Palace or Santamarina, it currently houses Technical Training Institute No. 75. In 1976, it was transferred by the provincial Ministry of Education to the Buenos Aires Provincial Police, becoming the Directorate of Interior Zone Security. It was recognized as the place where around eight people were held captive and subjected to torture.

=== El Silencio (Tigre) ===
It operated on an island in Tigre originally intended as a rest area for members of the Archdiocese of Buenos Aires. In 1979, a CCD was established with the aim of hiding prisoners during the inspection visit carried out by the Inter-American Commission on Human Rights".

== Province of Córdoba ==
=== La Perla ===
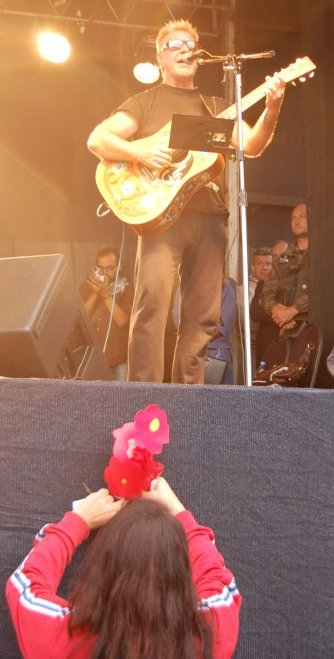
León Gieco sings in La Perla on March 24, 2007, the day of its recovery to build a memorial space.

"La Perla," also known as "la Universidad," was the primary clandestine detention center (CCD) used outside the Buenos Aires area. Around 3000 detainees passed through there.

It was located 12 km from the City of Córdoba, on National Route No. 20 that leads from the capital city to Carlos Paz. The facilities are visible from the route, on the right-hand side, heading towards Carlos Paz, in front of the Corcemar factory (31°25′52″S 64°17′50″W).

"La Perla" was established in 1975, before the military coup of March 24, 1976, and was dismantled in 1979.

It was within Military Zone 3, under the command of the III Army Corps under General Luciano Benjamín Ménéndez, who frequently inspected the CCD; General Sasiaiñ was his second in command, and Colonel César Emilio Anadón was in direct command of La Perla.

In the book "Survivors of La Perla," the authors declare:

In La Perla, prisoners were shot in the fields surrounding the center. They were transported there in a truck nicknamed 'Menéndez Benz'. Geuna said: 'Before getting off the vehicle, they were tied up. Then they were made to kneel in front of the pit and were shot. Officers from all units of the Third Corps participated in the shootings, from sub-lieutenants to generals'. (Contepomi 1984)

After 2000, a decision was made in Córdoba to create a Museum of Memory in the building that housed the Department of Intelligence D-2 of the local police, on Santa Catalina passage, on one side of the historic Cabildo of the city of Córdoba. The D-2 was not a permanent CCD but the arrival place for detainees in transit to La Perla, Campo de La Ribera, or the Penitentiary of San Martín UP1.

=== La Ribera ===
The Military Prison for Defendants "Campo de la Ribera" became a CCD starting in 1975. The investigation confirmed this operation. 'We were sent to La Ribera for periods of approximately twenty days, always accompanied by Gendarmerie officers'... 'I was there six times and saw about thirty detainees, men and women, housed in a block. Every day, members of the Intelligence of Battalion 141 came. When they did it at night, they usually brought 'packages,' as detainees were commonly referred to. When they took them for interrogation, sometimes we were ordered to 'soften them up,' which meant subjecting them to harsh punishment in an area near the river' (Testimony of Gendarme Carlos Beltrán, File No. 4213). 'There was a room for interrogations. There, I saw how detainees were tortured, submerged in a drum with water. Among the interrogators, I remember 'H.B.,' 'Gino,' 'Vargas,' and 'Fogo' (Gendarme José María Domínguez – File No. 4213). Precisely from the testimonial declaration of Lt. Col. Juan Carlos Lona, made in Federal Court No. 2 of Córdoba on June 27, 1984, as well as other evidence corroborating it, the withdrawal in December 1975 of the regular personnel who worked in that military prison meant its transformation into a clandestine jail: 'I worked between 1971 and 1977 as Head of the Military Prison for Defendants of Córdoba. In December 1975, following orders from the III Army Corps Command, all personnel were transferred to the La Calera Garrison. The direct responsibility for civilians who might be housed there was transferred to the mentioned Command'. The complaint made by this commission to the Judiciary regarding the case of Amelia Gélida Inzaurralde – who was removed from Buen Pastor prison and taken to La Ribera, where she died due to torture – led to the prosecution of General Juan Bautista Sasiaiñ. The Judge in charge, Dr. Gustavo Becerra Ferrer, explicitly supports the above when he says textually in the considerations of his resolution: 'Consequently, given the position held by the declarant (which allows us to consider his statements as a well-founded and authoritative version), it is clear that the immediate responsible for the Military Prison was the accused Sasiaiñ, and in the higher hierarchical order, the Corps Commander, General Luciano Benjamín Menéndez'. (...) 'What has been determined above clearly shows that the detention place 'Campo de la Ribera' was not a 'Military Prison' but rather a Civil Detention facility that nevertheless retained the latter designation, which is indisputable as such but debatable regarding its purpose in that sense; according to the organizational chart drawn up by Sasiaiñ at page 93, the maximum functional responsibility corresponded to the head of area 311’.

=== D-2, Department of Information of the Police of Córdoba ===
The D-2, Department of Information of the Police of Córdoba, was created as a special division to pursue and repress opponents. It first operated where the tenth police station is now located and between 1978 and 1983, in the house located at Mariano Moreno and Caseros. In 2009, the basement was found after some excavations, which was one of the places of confinement for political prisoners.

== Province of Corrientes ==
=== Campo Hípico de Goya ===
A CCD operated in Campo Hípico de Goya where men and women persecuted for their political, social, and union activism were kidnapped and tortured, and where several people were killed. It belongs to the Army's 121st Telecommunications Company. In certain cases, the abducted were transferred to other CCDs in the area or to the prisons of the cities of Corrientes and Resistencia. Among the abducted were farmers delegates of the Agrarian Leagues, teachers, and social activists linked to the local diocese of Bishop Alberto Devoto.

== Province of Mendoza ==
=== Palacio Policial de Mendoza ===
The Information Department (D-2) of the Mendoza Police Headquarters was the most important CCD in the province due to its central role in the repressive structure and the place where most of Mendoza's disappeared detainees were located. The former D2 began to be recognized as a memorial site in the 1984 CONADEP report.

=== IV Brigada Aérea ===
It operated in the Communications Company located in the IV Air Brigade of Mendoza.

== Province of Misiones ==
National and provincial records account for the existence of 36 former clandestine detention centers in Misiones. As of 2017, only three had been identified – La Casita del Mártires, Delegación Posadas de la Policía Federal and Jefatura de Policía de la Provincia de Misiones, Departamento de Informaciones-. Additionally, in that same year, the former Posadas Jail was identified – demolished and is now the location of the Polimodal Educational Center No. 4 Ayacucho between Catamarca and Entre Ríos. La Casita del Rowing – located at the height of Acceso Sur and Bouchardo, disappeared after coastal treatment, and the Subprefecture in Santa Ana.

=== La Casita de Mártires, Posadas ===
"La Casita de Mártires" in Posadas operated as a CCD and torture center where people were murdered between 1976 and 1983. A house had been established on that site since 1956, intended as a police detachment belonging to the Misiones Provincial Police.

== Province of Santiago del Estero ==
=== Combat Engineers Battalion 141 ===
A CCD operated on this site, where an unspecified number of citizens were kidnapped, tortured, and disappeared victims of the repressive actions of the dictatorship. In that province, there were a dozen CCDs, six of them dependent on the provincial police, which before and after the dictatorship was commanded by the convicted repressor for crimes against humanity, Musa Azar Curi. Also, Battalion 141, actively involved in Operativo Independencia and in all provincial repressive activities where about 150 young people were detained or disappeared. The first military intervener in the province was Daniel Virgilio Correa Aldana, who in 1976 was the head of this Battalion, with the rank of colonel.

== Province of Santa Fe ==
=== Information Service (SI) Santa Fe Police ===
The Information Service (SI) of the Santa Fe Police, in the city of Rosario, Santa Fe Province, is the name by which the main clandestine detention center (CCD) and extermination of the region is known. Approximately 2000 were detained there between 1976 and 1979, during Argentina's last civic-military dictatorship. It currently functions as the Popular Center of Remembrance, run by relatives of the disappeared.

=== Arsenal Battalion of Fray Luis Beltrán ===
The grounds of the Arsenal Battalion 603 (formerly Battalion 121), belonging to the Army, were used as a CCD where men and women persecuted for their political, social, and union activism in the so-called Cordón Industrial were kidnapped, tortured, and remained detained. The former Battalion 121 was part of a repressive circuit alongside clandestine detention centers in Greater Rosario such as La Calamita, La Intermedia, and Quinta de Funes, among other sites under the command of the II Army Corps, responsible for illegal repression in Santa Fe and Northeast Argentina. In 2015, it was designated as a Site of Memory.

=== Quinta de Funes ===
Located in Funes, it is one of the five centers that were part of the repressive circuit under the command of Intelligence Detachment 121 of Rosario, commanded during the dictatorship by Colonel Pascual Oscar Guerrieri. Between 1977 and 1978, men and women persecuted for their political and social activism were detained and tortured there. It was expropriated in 2017 to become a site of memory.

=== Other CCDs ===
- Guardia Rural "Los Pumas" (Vera Department).
- Communications Battalion 121 of Rosario (Rosario).
- Technical School No. 288 "Osvaldo Magnasco" of Rosario (Rosario).

== Province of San Luis ==
The most important Clandestine Detention and Torture Centers that operated in the Province of San Luis were:

=== City of San Luis ===
- Central Police: at the corner of San Martín between Pringles and Belgrano, now housing the BAS XXI program of the provincial government.
- Granja La Amalia: located on Europa street behind the railway station, the land belonged to the army.
- Delegation of the Federal Police: now houses OSDE, located on Av. Illia, 20 meters from Chacabuco.
- Investigations: Lavalle street between Rivadavia and Colón. It is now the Social Box of the Province.
- Rodeo del Alto: on route 20, now the Club de Suboficiales of the army.
- La Escuelita: building located on Justo Daract almost Ejército de los Andes, currently a tire shop.
- Minor's Police Station: located in the old Rawson neighborhood and corresponding to the fourth police station.
- El Sótano: detention and torture center located on Chile and Ejército de los Andes streets, behind the Tac Cooperative parcel office.
- Women's Prison: a building owned by the provincial police, located on 25 de Mayo street between Rivadavia and San Martín, opposite Plaza Independencia.

=== Interior ===
Outside the city, the Army's Campo known as Granja La Amalia and Rodeo del Alto also functioned as Clandestine Centers. These sites, located on Route 20 towards Juana Koslay, depended of the Army Subofficers Circle. The murdered and some tortured individuals, tied with stones, were thrown from army planes into the dams: Cruz de Piedra, Potrero de los Funes, and La Florida.

== Province of Tucumán ==
=== Escuelita de Famaillá ===
The Escuelita de Famaillá became the first concentration camp in the country. It operated at the Diego de Rojas School on the outskirts of the city of Famaillá.

In February 1975, with the launch of "Operativo Independencia," a clandestine detention center was established in Famaillá, initially under the charge of General Acdel Vilas, later succeeded by General Antonio Domingo Bussi. From that moment until the military coup of 1976, it operated in a school that was under construction in the city of Famaillá.

=== Arsenal Miguel de Azcuénaga ===
The Arsenal Miguel de Azcuénaga functioned as a clandestine center for kidnappings and torture during the last civic-military coup. It is estimated that more than 400 detained-disappeared individuals were detained in that place. Since 2005, professionals have been working there in collaboration with human rights organizations. The LIGIAAT (Laboratory of Research of the Interdisciplinary Group of Archaeology and Anthropology of Tucumán) and the EAAF (Argentine Forensic Anthropology Team) operated there, focusing on excavations within the detention center and clandestine burial sites. In late 2016, they reported the halt in payments for the research team, and the Archaeology and Anthropology Research Laboratory was notified of the temporary suspension of forensic tasks. Twelve bodies were found in the pits, of which eleven were identified. In 2017, at the initiative of José Cano (Agreement for the Bicentennial – Cambiemos), the Nation ceded land from the former Clandestine Center, Arsenal, for the construction of a campus of the National Technological University (UTN). The Provincial Human Rights Secretariat delivered a presentation to Federal Judge Daniel Bejas, requesting his intervention to understand the extent of the land donation from the Arsenal Miguel de Azcuénaga, as there is still a protective measure in place to safeguard evidence since there are still open graves containing the remains of disappeared detainees.

== Zone 5 ==
Between 1975 and 1983, the southern part of the country fell under the authority of Zone 5, along with its corresponding subzones and areas, each of one had complete repressive autonomy, including the management of clandestine detention centers.

Zone 5 covered the current province of Tierra del Fuego, the provinces of Santa Cruz, Chubut, Río Negro, and Neuquén, and the southwest of the Province of Buenos Aires (Districts of Adolfo Alsina, Guaminí, Coronel Suárez, Saavedra, Puán, Tornquist, Coronel Pringles, González Chávez, Coronel Dorrego, Tres Arroyos, Villarino, Bahía Blanca, Patagones). Its command base was in Bahía Blanca.

In Zone 5, CCDs were established in Bahía Blanca, Neuquén, and Rawson. In the Bahía Blanca area, several CCDs were set up, of which the main ones were "La Escuelita de Bahía Blanca" in the Command of the V Army Corps and "Baterías" in the Port Belgrano Naval Base. In Neuquén, "La Escuelita de Neuquén" was established in the former Battalion 181 (now Battalion 161) of the Army. In Rawson, a CCD was set up in the Rawson Penitentiary.

=== La Escuelita de Bahía Blanca ===
"La Escuelita" was a clandestine detention center located in the northeast of the city of Bahía Blanca, in the Villa Floresta neighborhood, on the road to Carrindanga (Camino de Cintura), behind the V Army Corps. It was a precarious and dilapidated building with two rooms that had served to house military horses, which was demolished before the fall of the dictatorship. It was the main extermination center in the southern Buenos Aires area, where hundreds of activists who ended up disappeared or executed in fake confrontations passed through.

In 2001, while the first trial of repressors in Bahía Blanca began, archaeologists from the National University of the South, called upon by the Justice system at the initiative of Memoria Abierta, made excavations to find the foundations of the clandestine center. The investigation allowed for the discovery of a 1944 plan, confirming that La Escuelita functioned 200 meters away from the ruins inspected by Conadep, and included the discovery of more than 13 thousand pieces that were underground, including syringes, containers of sedatives, and medical materials that the military would have used with the detainees.

A survivor, Alicia Mabel Partnoy, wrote a book about her experiences in the center titled precisely "La Escuelita", published in the United States in English in 1986 and in Spanish in 2006.

The center was under the command of the head of the 51st military subzone: Acdel Vilas (1976), Abel Teodoro Catuzzi (1977–1979), and Raúl José Ortiz (1979–1983). In 2006, the justice system arrested "El Laucha" Corres, an interrogator at the center, while in February 2010, nine retired Army subofficers accused of being torturers there were also detained.

=== La Escuelita de Neuquén ===
It was located in the Headquarters of the 181st Construction Engineers Battalion, at the exit of Neuquén City, on Route No. 22. Four kilometers before the airport, a dirt road of approximately 300 meters opens up on the left.

It consisted of two buildings separated by approximately 10 meters. An old house served as accommodation for the detainees, with bunk beds in each room. The walls were whitewashed, the floor was concrete, and the roof was made of metal sheets. There was a gap between the wall and the metal roof for air circulation. There was a hole in the roof for a surveillance turret. The detainees who passed through there were transferred to prison, brought back to be tortured, or taken to other penitentiaries. There were even disappeared detainees who passed through this unit. In 2015, it was designated as a "Site of Memory of State Terrorism" by the National Directorate of Memory Sites.

It had a bathroom with a small sink, a latrine, and a shower, and the access door was brown with a peephole. The other building, currently demolished, was a shed made of metal sheets, with a semi-arched roof, a sliding door in anti-rust red, and a brick floor. There was pedestrian communication with the Battalion. The main access was through a gate controlled by Guard Post 5.

=== Escuela Militar de Montaña ===
In Bariloche, the Mountain Military School functioned as a clandestine center on Avenida Bustillo between March 1976 and March 1977. Additionally, in the province of Río Negro, other centers operated in Viedma and Cipolletti, including the Second Police Station in the Civic Center and Gendarmerie Squadron 34.

== Province of Entre Ríos ==
=== Dictatorship period ===
The dictatorship period in Argentina from 1976 to 1982, self-proclaimed as the National Reorganization Process, involved all the provinces of the country. Likewise, the illegal deprivation of freedom and the consequent disappearances that occurred in Argentina and in the province could not have been carried out without clandestine detention centers, i.e., without an infrastructure that allowed the victims to be kept in secrecy.

In Entre Ríos, up to the present day, 303 entrerrianos have been accounted for as disappeared by the armed forces in various locations in the province and in the rest of the country. Regarding the disappeared entrerrianos in the province, 10 cases are being processed in the Federal Court of Paraná, 6 cases in the Federal Court of Concepción del Uruguay, and a complaint made to the Federal Prosecutor's Office of Concepción del Uruguay that is awaiting the opening of the case.

==== Clandestine Centers ====
- Center located in facilities of the II Communications Regiment of Paraná.
- Torture center located behind the Paraná Air Base.
- Clandestine detention center in the Lebensohn and Don Uva area, according to complaints made to the National Secretariat for Human Rights during 2004. It is believed that "La Escuelita" also operated on Montiel Street and the road to the municipal quarry.
- Center located near the Gualeguaychú Aero Club.
- Facilities of the Gualeguaychú military unit.
- Center located in facilities of the Armored Cavalry Regiment of Concordia.

==== Clandestine Centers – Dependencies of Penitentiary Units of Entre Ríos ====
- Penitentiary Unit No. 1, in the director's house and the Family Unit.
- Penitentiary Unit No. 6.
- Penitentiary Unit No. 2 of Gualeguaychú.

==== Clandestine Centers – Police Dependencies in Entre Ríos ====
- "El Brete" Police Station.
- Paraná Delegation of the Federal Police.
- Investigations Department of the Provincial Police.
- Police of the province of Entre Ríos.
- Police Headquarters of Concepción del Uruguay.

== See also ==
- Black site
- Disappeared Detainees of the Dirty War

== Bibliography ==
- Almirón, Fernando (1999). Campo Santo; testimonios del ex sargento Victor Ibáñez (in Spanish). Buenos Aires: Nuestra América. ISBN 987-97022-8-X.
- Andersen, Martin Edwin (2000). Dossier Secreto (in Spanish). Buenos Aires: Sudamericana. ISBN 950-07-1863-4.
- Butazzoni, Fernando (1986). El tigre y la nieve (in Spanish). Montevideo: Banda Oriental. ISBN 84-88455-48-8.
- Calveiro, Pilar (1998). Poder y desaparición. Los campos de concentración en Argentina (in Spanish). Buenos Aires: Colihue. ISBN 950-581-185-3.
- Cerrutti, Gabriela (1998). Entrevista a Alfredo Astiz (in Spanish). Vol. Enero. Tres Puntos.
- Comisión Nacional sobre la Desaparición de las Personas (1984). Nunca Más (in Spanish). Buenos Aires: Eudeba. ISBN 950-23-0111-0.
- Contepomi, Patricia; Contempomi, Gustavo (1984). Sobrevivientes de la Perla (PDF) (in Spanish). Buenos Aires: El Cid Editor.
- Dürr, Christian (2017). Memorias incómodas. El dispositivo de la desaparición y el testimonio de los sobrevivientes de los Centros Clandestinos de Detención, Tortura y Exterminio (in Spanish). Temperley: Tren en Movimiento. ISBN 978-987-3789-26-7.
- Presidencia de la Nación Argentina (2006). "24 de marzo: del horror a la esperanza". Amnistía Internacional denuncia a la Junta (in Spanish). Buenos Aires: Presidencia de la Nación. Archived from the original on 2006-04-09.
- Seoane, María (2001). El dictador. ISBN 950-07-1955 (in Spanish). Buenos Aires: Sudamericana.
- Timerman, Jacobo (1982). Prisionero sin nombre, celda sin número (in Spanish). New York: Vintage Books.
- Uriarte, Claudio (1991). Almirante Cero. ISBN 950-742-134-3 (in Spanish). Buenos Aires: Planeta.
- Veiras, Nora (1998). "Había un reglamento de lucha antisubversiva, entrevista a Martín Balza". Página 12 (in Spanish). Enero (12 de junio). Archived from the original on September 27, 2007.
