= General Sarmiento Partido =

Partido de General Sarmiento
- Partido of Buenos Aires Province
- 1889–1995
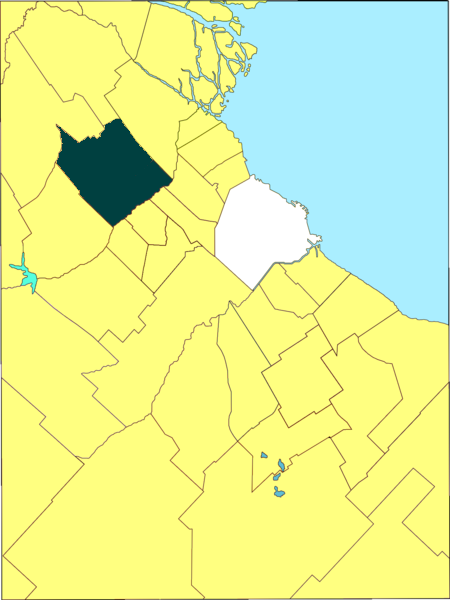
- Map of General Sarmiento Province highlighted in black.
- Capital: San Miguel
- Population
  - 1991: 652,969
- History
  - Established: 18 October 1889
  - Disestablished: 10 December 1995
Succeeded by
José C. Paz Partido
Malvinas Argentinas Partido
San Miguel Partido

General Sarmiento (Spanish: Partido de General Sarmiento) was one of the partidos of the province of Buenos Aires, located in the northwest of the greater Buenos Aires urban area.

== History ==
The creation of General Sarmiento Partido was announced on 18 October 1889 by Provincial Law No. 2,198, comprising the towns of San Miguel, Bella Vista and territories of the partidos of Pilar and Las Conchas (now Tigre).

In 1994 Provincial Law No. 11,551 / 94.4 was enacted, through which it was decided to legally dissolve the General Sarmiento Partido and create the José C. Paz, Malvinas Argentinas and San Miguel Partidos in its territory until then. As the second of the new administrative jurisdictions also received a small portion of only 3 km^{2} from the partido of Pilar. As compensation for this loss, the entire town of Del Viso was incorporated into the jurisdiction of Pilar.

General Sarmiento officially ceased to exist on 10 December 1995, the day the municipal activities of the three new parties began to function. However, the National University of General Sarmiento (UNGS), which for its part, was founded in 1992 and whose main headquarters became located in the Malvinas Argentinas Partido, continues to maintain its old name.

== Demographics ==
Its population, which was already 502,926 inhabitants, according to the 1980 census, with an average density of 2,566 inhabitants/km^{2}), in 1991, the population was recorded to be 652,969. (3,331 pop./km^{2}). It was then lowered to 638,486, due to the post-census territorial readjustment.

For their part, the three partidos into which it was divided had a combined population of 743,585. (3,853 pop./km^{2}) According to the 2001 census, it had a population of 864,546, according to the census carried out at the end of 2010.

If it continued to exist, and if it maintained the growth shown between 2001 and 2010, General Sarmiento would have had about 971,518 inhabitants by mid-2020 (4,938 inhabitants/km^{2}), so it would be the second most populous partido in the Greater Buenos Aires agglomeration, after La Matanza.
