= National Route 8 (Argentina) =

Highway in Argentina

National Route 8
- Ruta nacional 8

Route information
- Length: 695 km (432 mi)
- Existed: 1943–present

Major junctions
- Eastern end: El Triángulo
- Western end: Villa Mercedes

Location
- Country: Argentina

Highway system
- Highways in Argentina

National Route 8 (Spanish: Ruta Nacional 8) is a highway located in Argentina, that connects the provinces of Buenos Aires, Santa Fe, Córdoba and San Luis. The route starts at the link with National Route 9 in the northwest of Greater Buenos Aires, between the towns of El Talar, El Triángulo, Ricardo Rojas and Ingeniero Pablo Nogués, to the link with Provincial Route 55 in Villa Mercedes, San Luis Province at 695 km (432 mi).

== History ==
National Route 8 did not exist in the original numbering plan of national routes of 3 September 1935. This route was formed in 1943 with part of the trace of National Route 9 from Buenos Aires to Pergamino, National Route 186, from this city to Río Cuarto, and National Route 160, from this Cordoban city to Villa Mercedes.

This road has been paved since 1940, so from that moment on it was the obligatory way to access the cities of San Luis and Mendoza. This changed in the mid-1970s when the pavement of National Route 7 was completed, also connecting Buenos Aires with Villa Mercedes with a permanent transit road, but with a more direct route and 31 km (19 mi) shorter. Route 7 became the main road between Buenos Aires and Mendoza.

By means of National Decree 1595 of the year 1979, it was prescribed that the section between Avenida General Paz and Pilar (43.7 km (27.2 mi)) should pass to provincial jurisdiction. The provincial government of Buenos Aires took charge of it in 1988, changing its name to Provincial Route 8.

Since 1980, the beginning of this route is accessed through the Acceso Norte Ingeniero Pascual Palazzo (Decree No. 17/1981) "Pan-American Route" National Route 9.

Since 1990, the section from Pilar to Villa Mercedes belongs administratively to the National Road Corridor No. 4, sharing sections with National Routes 33, 36, 38, 193, A-005, and was thus concessioned.

On 2 November 2006, the deed of possession of the toll concession for the construction, maintenance, administration and operation of a highway between Pilar and Pergamino was signed in favor of the temporary union of companies Corporación América - Helport., this union of companies was later renamed Corredor Americano S.A. In 2008, the work was considered suspended when only 9 km (5.6 mi) had been completed without collectors (of the total 180 km (110 mi) planned), until the access to Capilla del Señor, enabling a station of toll at km 66 which was added to the one already existing at km 102. Due to the stoppage of the works, on 10 June 2010 the National Highway Administration and the concession company signed an agreement to terminate the contract subject to the agreement of the National Executive Power. Six days later, the latter issued a decree revoking the contract. In 2014, the project was presented to convert it into a highway, which covers 170 kilometers, the Pilar Pergamino Highway will link the cities of Pilar, Capilla del Señor, and San Antonio de Areco, Capitán Sarmiento, Arrecifes and Pergamino. The layout for the first 100 km (62 mi) will be developed along the current RN 8 layout, while the remaining 80 km (50 mi) would be built anew. Although despite the termination, it continues to be charged at the Larena toll station.

Currently, this extension is being executed by the National Highway Administration, working simultaneously on the sections Intersection of Provincial Route 39 - Parada Robles, Parada Robles - Access to San Antonio de Areco, Arrecifes Bypass and Pergamino Bypass.
