= Peru (disambiguation) =

Peru (Spanish: Perú) is a country in South America.

Peru or El Peru may also refer to:

== Places ==
=== United States ===
- Peru, Illinois, a city
- Peru, Indiana, a town
- Old Peru, Iowa, also called Peru, an unincorporated community
- Peru, Kansas, a city
- Peru, Maine, a town
- Peru, Massachusetts, a town
- Peru, Missouri, an extinct town
- Peru, Nebraska, a city
  - Peru State College, in Peru, Nebraska
- Peru, New York, a town
- Peru, Pennsylvania, an unincorporated community
- Peru, Vermont, a town
- Peru, West Virginia, an unincorporated community
- Peru, Wisconsin, a town
  - Peru, Portage County, Wisconsin, an unincorporated community
- Peru Township (disambiguation), multiple places

=== Elsewhere ===
- Peru, Iran, a village in Semnan Province, Iran
- Perú, La Pampa, Argentina, a village and municipality

=== Historical and archaeological ===
- The Spanish Viceroyalty of Peru, which existed from 1542 to 1824
- El Perú (Maya site), or Waka' a Maya archaeological site in Guatemala

== People and characters ==
- Bobby Peru, a deranged robber played by Willem Dafoe in the 1990 film Wild At Heart
- Coco Peru (born 1965), American actor and drag performer
- Envy Peru (born 1989), Dutch-Peruvian drag queen
- Peru Nolaskoain (born 1998), Spanish footballer

== Other uses ==
- Perú (Buenos Aires Metro), a metro station in Buenos Aires
- El Perú (book), on the natural history of Peru, by Antonio Raimondi
- Peru (band), a three-piece indie rock band based out of Long Island, New York
- "Peru" (song), a 2021 single by Nigerian singer Fireboy DML
- Peru, a standard color name from the X11 color names with the hex RGB value of #CD853F

== See also ==
- Madeleine Peyroux (born 1974), American jazz singer
