= Provincial Route 105 (La Pampa) =

Highway in La Pampa, Argentina

Provincial Route 105
- Ruta provincial 105

Route information
- Length: 180 km (110 mi)
- Existed: 1979–present

Major junctions
- From: Border with the San Luis Province
- To: National Route 152

Location
- Country: Argentina

Highway system
- Highways in Argentina

Provincial Route 105 is a highway located in the Argentine province of La Pampa. Its total route is 180 km, being partially asphalt.

== Route ==
Its northern end is the border with the San Luis Province; in that province it is called Provincial Route 55. It crosses the FCDFS tracks in the city of Victorica, and Provincial Route 10 about 4 km (2 mi) further south. It runs south through the town of Carro Quemado, being asphalt until Provincial Route 14 in the El Durazno area. From there, it is a natural dirt road that heads southwest towards National Route 152.

== History ==
From 1935 to 1979, RP 105 belonged entirely to National Route 148.
