= National Route 148 (Argentina) =

Highway in Argentina

National Route 148
- Ruta nacional 148

Route information
- Length: 41 km (25 mi)

Major junctions
- South end: Interprovincial boundary with San Luis
- North end: Provincial Route 14 in Villa Dolores

Location
- Country: Argentina

Highway system
- Highways in Argentina

National Route 148 (Spanish: Ruta Nacional 148) is a short highway located in the central region of Argentina. The approximately 40-km highway runs in a north–south direction.

Its kilometer 0 is located at the entrance to the city of Villa Dolores, more precisely at the Melchor Martino roundabout, on the end of the Provincial Route E88 that connects the towns of Las Tapias with the aforementioned Villa Dolores, in the west of the Córdoba Province, at the southern end of the Valle de Traslasierra, and ends when it reaches the border with the neighboring San Luis Province. On the attached map it is marked in red. In green is the section between the provincial border with Córdoba and National Route 188, a section that passed to provincial jurisdiction in 2008, and the same was done with the section in purple in 1979. In this short route, it does not cross any population.

== Former routes ==
Formerly, this route had a length of 761 km, up to the link with National Route 35, in the town of Perú, La Pampa Province, that is, the complete route indicated on the map. The section to the south of Nueva Galia, in San Luis, marked in purple and unpaved, passed to provincial jurisdiction through National Decree 1595 of 1979, except for the section between km 263.87 and 296.78 that corresponded to the overlap with National Route 152. The Province of San Luis accepted the transfer in 1981. The section between Villa Dolores and Villa Mercedes was paved in 1967, while the section between Nueva Galia and Villa Mercedes was paved in the first half of the 1970s.

By agreement signed on 4 September 2001 between the Ministry of Infrastructure and Housing and the Government of the Province of San Luis, National Route 148 was transferred in the section between the junction with National Route 188 and the border with the Province of Córdoba, marked in green on the map. In 2001, Governor Adolfo Rodríguez Saá invited bids for the project to convert Route 148 into a highway through Plan Mil, which will allow the construction of another 175 kilometers of highway between the cities of Villa Mercedes and Merlo, on the border with Córdoba.

The old route in the province of San Luis currently corresponds to Provincial Route 55, while in the Province of La Pampa there is currently Provincial Route 105 (only paved in the north of the province).
