= Provincial Route 8 (Buenos Aires) =

Highway in Argentina

Provincial Route 8
- Ruta provincial 8

Route information
- Length: 45 km (28 mi)
- Existed: 1988–present

Major junctions
- Southeast end: NR A001 in Villa Lynch
- Northwest end: NR 8 in Pilar

Location
- Country: Argentina
- Municipalities: San Martín, Tres de Febrero, San Miguel, Malvinas Argentinas, José C. Paz, Pilar

Highway system
- Highways in Argentina

Provincial Route 8 is a 45 km (28 mi) long paved highway located in Greater Buenos Aires, in the northeast of the province of Buenos Aires, in Argentina. It was part of National Route 8 (km 13.40 to 57.10) until 1988 and in 2017, there are still signs that indicate that this road is a national route.
