= Peru schools =

Peru schools may refer to:

- Education in Peru, relating to Peru in South America
- Peru Elementary School District 124, Peru, Illinois
- Peru Community Schools, Peru, Indiana
- Peru Central School District, Peru, New York

== See also ==
- Peru (disambiguation)
