= Olga Cabrera Hansen =

Argentine lawyer and activist (born 1935)

Olga Delfina Emilia Cabrera Hansen
- Born: January 13, 1935 (age 91); Rosario
- Occupation: Lawyer

Olga Delfina Emilia Cabrera Hansen (born January 13, 1935) is a lawyer from the city of Rosario, human rights activist, and victim of Argentina's last military dictatorship. Hansen is primarily known for performing legal work on the events surrounding the clandestine detention center and the Information Service (SI) of the police headquarters of Santa Fe, Argentina.

== Description ==
Hansen was the victim of two bombs: one in her study, in September 1975, and another in her home, in February 1976. At the end of 1976, she was kidnapped—along with engineer Eduardo Carafa, who had come to her house for legal work—by the army. Her three children were left behind.

In the clandestine detention center of the Information Service, Hansen was blindfolded and interrogated by police inspector Rosario Agustín Feced and José Rubén Lofiego. She spent several days in a hallway, where she listened to people being tortured. She was released after 20 days with broken ribs and her eyes damaged by an electric prod.

=== International Red Cross visit ===
The International Red Cross visited the detention center in February 1977. When the delegation began asking questions, Olga spoke out, stating that no judge knew she was there, that the facility was near the courthouse, that detainees had no sunlight or visitors, and that torture and killings took place. Afterward, she was told she could have been released, but because of what she said, her detention was extended by two years.

== Testimony ==
In 2010, a second public oral trial began in the federal courts concerning crimes against humanity committed during Argentina’s last military dictatorship in the Greater Rosario area, known as the Díaz Bessone case (formerly the Feced case). The defendants included one army officer and five civilians accused of participating in repression at a clandestine detention center in the Police Headquarters. Those charged included former Second Army Corps commander Ramón Díaz Bessone and several former police officers linked to the repressive apparatus under police chief Agustín Feced.

In November 2010, Olga testified before the Federal Oral Court. Her testimony was significant because she was not only a witness, but also directly represented the history under investigation. She stated that the police chaplain, Eugenio Zitelli, justified torture before detainees and that sexual abuse was systematic at the center. She also described the arrival of María Inés Luchetti de Bettanín with a newborn baby, who had no clothes; the detainees improvised garments from their own clothing. In addition to pointing to Feced and Lofiego, Olga remembered the presence of Ramón Rito Vergara in the basement of the SI. To unveil the network of complicities, she mentioned the close relations between his official defender, Laura Cosidoy, and Major Fernando Soria, who in charge of the war council simulacra in the Second Army Corps Command.

== Legal activity ==
Hansen played a key legal role in reconstructing what occurred at the Information Service during the dictatorship, where the largest clandestine detention center in Santa Fe province operated and where she herself was held. After her release in 1978, she joined the Permanent Assembly for Human Rights and began connecting families of the disappeared with former detainees, helping piece together what she later called a “sinister puzzle.” Together with Delia Rodríguez Araya, she investigated complaints and helped shape the Feced case, which formally began in provincial courts in 1984.

Before 1979, human rights organizations mainly processed habeas corpus petitions that were consistently denied. Hansen recalled a moment when three women came searching for their sister, María Sol Pérez Losada. By recognizing details of her case and directing them to former detainees, a broader chain of reports began.

== Tribute ==
In 2011, tribute was paid to lawyers, most of whom graduated from the National University of Rosario, who took up the defense of victims of the last military dictatorship and who accompanied relatives in the search for justice.

== Distinguished Lawyer of the City of Rosario ==
In November 2016, on the premises of the City Council of Rosario, Hansen was declared "Distinguished Lawyer of the City of Rosario", citing her vast, unwavering career and invaluable contribution in the field of law, her striving for the fundamental rights of people in any situation and place, her participation as an advocate and her contribution in the CONADEP in the Never More chapter dedicated to the province of Santa Fe and in particular to the city of Rosario.
