= Julio Simón =

Argentinian police officer (1940–2025)

Julio Héctor Simón (12 August 1940 – 25 March 2025), nom-de-guerre Turco Julián ("Julian the Turk"), was an Argentinian police officer, known for being a torturer during the National Reorganization Process. His case was famous due to his brutality and revindication of Nazi ideas, but also after a presidential pardon of President Carlos Menem he started to make appearances on television and confrontation with some of his old victims.

After years of avoiding legal proceedings, in 2006 his case was the first one treated in the Supreme Court of Argentina and his pardon revoked.

== Life and career ==
Simón began his career as a volunteer in the Argentine Navy, but after a short period he solicited entry to the Argentine Federal Police as a non-commissioned officer in 1967. Ten years later, then a police sergeant, he was recruited by the military. He was assigned as a torturer in the detention centers El Olimpo, El Atlético and El Banco, all located in or around Buenos Aires and commanded by General Guillermo Suárez Mason, during the dictatorship known as the National Reorganization Process in 1976. He was also in charge of illegal arrests. According to Simón, he was in charge of deciding which prisoners would be murdered at El Olimpo. During his trial, he stated that "[t]he general criterion was to kill everyone."

After the return to democracy in Argentina in December 1983, he moved to Brazil in order to avoid judicial processes against him, but returned to Argentina after running out of money. Although multiple cases were opened against him for torture at the time, he was not charged before the enactment by the National Congress of the so-called Full Stop Law in 1986 and the Law of Due Obedience in 1987. From the 1990s he made several appearances on Argentinian television programs, including Telenoche and programs led by Mauro Viale, justifying and trivializing crimes against humanity committed during the Dirty War.

The Full Stop Law and the Law of Due Obedience were repealed by the National Congress in August 2003, allowing for cases relating to crimes against humanity committed during the Dirty War to be reopened. Simón was indicted in November 2003 for the kidnapping, torture and disappearance of José Poblete Roa and Gertrudis Hlaczik de Poblete in 1978, as well as for the appropriation of their child, Claudia Poblete. Simón argued that he still benefited from immunity from prosecution under the former laws; the case went before the Supreme Court of Argentina, which declared the two laws to have been unconstitutional and void in June 2005. On 4 August 2006, Simón was sentenced to 25 years in prison. On 18 December 2007, he was sentenced again to 23 years in prison in the so-called Batallón 601 case, for the kidnapping, torture and disappearance of six other individuals. The Supreme Court also decided on the imprescriptibility of the crimes in relation to Simón's case in 2006, making possible the opening of other lawsuits against people involved in the Dirty War, even with a pardon from former President Carlos Menem.

He always justified his actions as part of a fight against communists, saying "… what I did I did for my Fatherland, my faith, and my religion. Of course I would do it again", during an interview with the American journalist Marguerite Feitlowitz. According to some witnesses, he never denied his sympathy with Nazism, even to using a swastika as a keychain and fantasizing of being a part of the Gestapo. According to these versions, he was more cruel with Jewish people, being gentle with other detainees.

Simón died at Campo de Mayo prison in San Miguel, Buenos Aires Province, on 25 March 2025, at the age of 84.
