= National University of General Sarmiento =

- Universidad Nacional de General Sarmiento
- Motto: Estudiar es tu derecho
- Type: Public
- Established: 1993
- Academic affiliations: RUNCob
- Rector: Dr Flavia Terigi
- Faculty: 486
- Students: 8,399 (2007)
- Undergraduates: 7,879
- Postgraduates: 520
- Location: Los Polvorines, Buenos Aires; 34°31′20″S 58°42′00″W
- Campus: Urban
- Colors: White and turquoise
- Sporting affiliations: LDU
- Website: www.ungs.edu.ar

The National University of General Sarmiento (UNGS) (Castilian: Universidad Nacional de General Sarmiento) is a national university in Argentina, founded in 1993. It is located in the localidad (small city) of Los Polvorines, of Malvinas Argentinas Partido, in the Greater Buenos Aires urban area.

== Academics ==
UNGS is composed of four colleges (called institutos), offering seventeen courses.

The five colleges of UNGS are:

- Instituto de Ciencias (ICI)
- Instituto del Conurbano (ICO)
- Instituto del Desarrollo Humano (IDH)
- Instituto de Industria (IDEI)
- Escuela secundaria

=== Undergraduate programs ===
The university offers several undergraduate programs including History, Geography, Education, Philosophy, Communication, Culture, Political Sciences, Public Policy, Urbanism, Economics, Mathematics, Administration, Chemistry Physics and Engineering.

=== Graduate programs ===
The graduate program such as Specializations, Master and PhD Programs.

== Student life ==
Most students are from Buenos Aires, though there are also international students from other Latin American countries. Noted faculty include José Luis Coraggio, a published economist.

== See also ==
- Science and Education in Argentina
- Argentine Higher Education Official Site
- Argentine Universities
