= Guerra sucia =

Guerra sucia (Spanish for dirty war) may refer to:

- Dirty War (Argentina, 1974-1983), a period of state-sponsored violence against dissident and other citizens carried out by the military governments of Jorge Rafael Videla and others
- Dirty War (Mexico), a 20th-century internal conflict between the US-backed PRI government, and left-wing student and guerrilla groups
- GAL (paramilitary group) (Spain, 1983-1987), illegal death squads established to fight Basque separatist militants

== See also ==
- Dirty War (disambiguation)
