= Ingeniero Adolfo Sourdeaux =

Adolfo Sourdeaux
- Location in Argentina
- Coordinates: 34°28′S 58°46′W
- Country: Argentina
- Province: Buenos Aires
- Partido: Malvinas Argentinas
- Elevation: 20 m (66 ft)

Population (2001 census [INDEC])
  - Total: 25,951
- CPA Base: B 1613
- Area code: +54 11

Ingeniero Adolfo Sourdeaux (commonly known as Adolfo Sourdeaux) is a town in Malvinas Argentinas Partido of Buenos Aires Province, Argentina. It is located in the north west of the Greater Buenos Aires urban agglomeration.

== Name ==
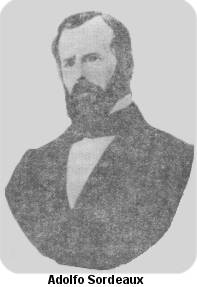

The town is named after French engineer Adolfo Sourdeaux who arrived in Argentina in 1845.
