= Years of Lead =

Years of Lead is a phrase used in several countries to refer to periods of history marked by military repression, political violence or terrorism.

Years of lead may refer to:

== Historical periods ==
- Years of Lead (Brazil), period of state violence against dissidents under the military dictatorship of Emílio Garrastazu Médici from 1968 to 1974
- Years of Lead (Italy), period of far-right and far-left anti-Democratic terrorism in Italy from 1966–1984
- Years of Lead (Morocco), period of state violence against dissidents under the rule of King Hassan II of Morocco from the 1960s–1980s
- Dirty War, Period of state terrorism in Argentina from 1974 to 1983.

== Films ==
- Marianne and Juliane (German title: Die bleierne Zeit, 'The Years of Lead'), 1981 West German film

== See also ==
- Dirty War (disambiguation)
