= Grand Bourg =

City in Buenos Aires Province, Argentina

- City
- Location in Greater Buenos Aires
- Coordinates: 34°29′01.1″S 58°43′44.3″W
- Country: Argentina
- Province: Buenos Aires
- Partido: Malvinas Argentinas
- Elevation: 18 m (59 ft)

Population (2001 census [INDEC])
  - Total: 85,189
- CPA Base: B 1615
- Area code: +54 02320

Grand Bourg is a city in Malvinas Argentinas Partido, Buenos Aires Province, Argentina. It forms part of the Greater Buenos Aires agglomeration.

== Toponymy ==
Grand Bourg is named after the Grand Bourg villa in the Paris suburb where the leader of the Argentine War of Independence, General José de San Martín lived during part of his exile (today, a neighbourhood of Évry-Courcouronnes).

== History ==
The location belonged to the 19th century estancias of Juan Andrés de Cabo and Pastor Parra. Orchards and dairy farms thus predominated until, in 1948, the first lots were sold by the G.C. Grosso real estate company along the Belgrano North Railway Line. A stop was opened at the site in 1951, followed by a station in 1956. Known initially as Primero de Mayo, the station and town were renamed Grand Bourg in 1959.

The city became a significant manufacturing center in subsequent decades.

The "Cemetery of Grand Bourg" was the site of one of the largest mass graves found in the aftermath of Argentina's Dirty War of the late 1970s; over three hundred cadavers thus buried were located at the cemetery in 1984.

Grand Bourg was declared a city by the Provincial Legislature on November 28, 1985.
