= Colegio Máximo de San José =

Jesuit religious college in Argentina

Coordinates: 34°33′28.38″S 58°43′51.34″W

Maximum College of St. Joseph
- Colegio Máximo de San José
- Established: 1931; 95 years ago
- Affiliation: Roman Catholic (Jesuit)
- Director: Rev. Jorge P. Black, SJ
- Location: San Miguel, Buenos Aires, Argentina
- Website: www.jesuitas-sm.com.ar

The Colegio Máximo de San José (English: Maximum College of St. Joseph) is a Jesuit religious college in San Miguel, Buenos Aires, Argentina. Pope Francis studied there during his youth.

== History ==
In 1920, the Jesuits acquired land in the town of San Miguel, in the Province of Buenos Aires. They bought a terrain of 36 hectares.

Began the construction of what in 1931 was inaugurated as the Colegio Máximo de San José, a house of formation of regional scope, with the faculties of Philosophy and Theology, and with Argentine, Chilean, Uruguayan and Paraguayan religious students. The terms "Colegio máximo" ("Maximum College") is an internal standard in the Society of Jesus for schools of philosophy and theology, the most important studies in a Jesuit's career. The degrees of philosophy and theology have civil value since 1967 and 1968.

As from 1967, the faculties of Philosophy and Theology of San Miguel were integrated to the Universidad del Salvador and, thus, their degrees have, in addition to the ecclesiastical one, a civil and national value.

In 1975 the Society of Jesus left the Universidad del Salvador. However, the faculties of Philosophy and Theology of San Miguel, by special agreement with the new authorities of the university, continued to be integrated and to grant degrees with civil value.

The Colegio Máximo de San José operated in San Miguel until 2017, when it returned to Córdoba, after 250 years, with the two ecclesiastical faculties, and integrated the structure of the Catholic University of Córdoba, now also open to "civil" students, and with its specialized historical library, the Library of the Colegio Máximo de la Compañía de Jesús, today called Biblioteca Colegio Máximo de San Miguel.

== In popular culture ==
The Colegio, which was attended by Jorge Mario Bergoglio (the future Pope Francis), is portrayed in the 2019 Netflix biographical film The Two Popes.

== See also ==
- List of Jesuit sites
- Biblioteca del Colegio Máximo de San Miguel
- Piana, J. y Sartori, F. (2012). 1610 : el Colegio Máximo de la Compañía de Jesús en Córdoba. La construcción de un falso histórico. 1a. ed. Córdoba: EDUCC. ISBN 978-987-626-189-0
