= Olimpo (detention center) =

El Olimpo was a clandestine detention center in Buenos Aires and used during the Dirty War in Argentina. Although it operated for only five months, from August 1978 to January 1979, about 700 people were illegally detained there, of whom only 50 survived. Jorge Fontevecchia, founder of the newspaper Editorial Perfil, was detained there.

== History ==
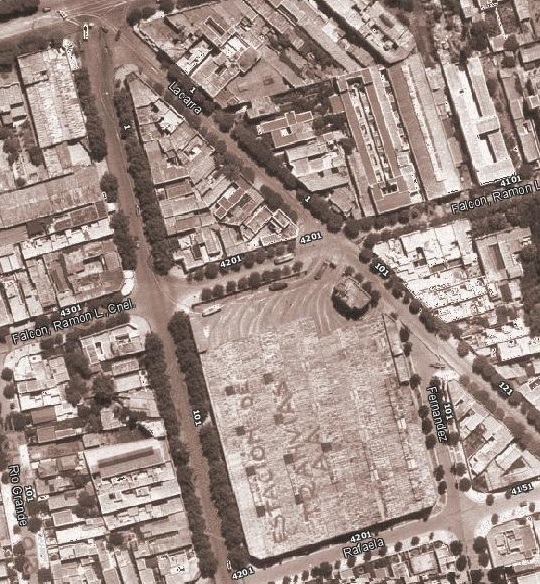
The property as tram terminal in 1940.

The building was originally built as a terminal station for the tram lines that traversed the route between the center of Buenos Aires and the west of the suburbs. In this terminal, the trams of two floors of Line 1 finished their route. With the definitive retirement of this means of transport, the place becomes a lodge for a bus terminal until being finally expropriated by the Armed Forces at the beginning of the military dictatorship. Legally, it was transferred to the Division of Automotive of the Federal Police.

== During the military dictatorship ==
During the first months of 1978, the old shed began to be adapted to be used as a clandestine detention center. The staff of the Federal Penitentiary Service was in charge of building cells to house the detainees, offices and torture rooms.

On 16 August of that year, detainees from other centers near the area began to move, mainly from El Banco, other clandestine detained center. The detainees were kidnapped and transported to the center blindfolded in private vehicles or army trucks. If they came from another center, they kept the letter and the number assigned as identification. The torture room was known as the "operation room". The clandestine center depended on Guillermo Suárez Mason, commander of the First Argentine Army Corps. Also operated there officials of the Argentine Federal Police like Julio Simón (known as Turco Julián) and Juan Antonio of the Hill (known as Colors).

== Structure ==
The center was divided between the empty sheds that were used as a parking for descent and ascent of the detained persons. Also, it had an administrative sector (dining room, infirmary, kitchen, offices and an intelligence base) and a torture and isolation rooms ("operation rooms" and three cells). Finally, there was a general cell sector (which could only be accessed from the administrative corridor or by an internal door of the shed guarded by a guard 24 hours a day).

The detainee section consisted of four consecutive rows of eleven cells each. In the space between one row and the other, there was, from left to right, a blind corridor, one that led to the showers and another that connected with the corridor of the administrative offices and the torture room.

=== Name's origin ===
After the renovation of 1978, a sign was posted on the access door that read: Welcome to the Olympus of the gods. Signed: The centurions. The torturers sought to convey the concept that, within the siege, they were the gods who decided the fate of the detainees, mere mortals.

== After the military dictatorship ==
With the arrival of democracy, the building passed effectively to the Argentine Federal Police and began to function as an automotive verification center. In 1999 a film was made with the name of Garage Olimpo, directed by Marco Bechis. The property was declared a historic site through Law 1197 of the Legislature of the City of Buenos Aires, and in June 2005 it was transferred to the Government of the City of Buenos Aires under the agreement signed between President Néstor Kirchner and the Head of Government Aníbal Ibarra on 4 October 2004.

== See also ==
- Dirty War
- Clandestine detention center (Argentina)
- Armed Forces of the Argentine Republic
- Films depicting Latin American military dictatorships
