= Provincial Route 55 (San Luis) =

Highway in San Luis Province, Argentina

Provincial Route 55
- Ruta provincial 55

Route information
- Length: 458 km (285 mi)
- Existed: 1979–present

Major junctions
- North end: National Route 148
- South end: RP 105 (La Pampa)

Location
- Country: Argentina

Highway system
- Highways in Argentina

Provincial Route 55 is a 458 km (285 mi) long paved highway that runs through San Luis Province, from north to south at the eastern end, near the border with the provinces of Córdoba and La Pampa.

== History ==
Originally this road was part of National Route 148. Through National Decree 1595 of 1979, the section south of the junction with National Route 188 in the town of Nueva Galia, passed to provincial jurisdiction. In this way the name was changed to Provincial Route 55.

This section was a dirt road at the time of the transfer, for which the provincial government subsequently paved it.

With an agreement signed on 4 September 2001 between the Ministry of Infrastructure and Housing and the Government of the Province of San Luis, National Route 148 was transferred in the section between the junction with National Route 188 and the border with the Province of Córdoba. This road was added to Provincial Route 55.

In December 2001, the provincial government put out to tender the construction of a 176 km (109 mi) highway between Villa Mercedes and Merlo. After 960 days of construction, the work was inaugurated on 10 August 2007 under the name Autopista de los Comechingones.

On 11 June 2009, work began to convert the 256 km (159 mi) section between Villa Mercedes and Arizona into a highway, near the border with the Province of La Pampa. On 19 March 2011, provincial authorities inaugurated the work that had a cost of 512 million pesos under the name Autopista por la Paz del Mundo.
