= Muñiz, Buenos Aires =

Town in Buenos Aires Province, Argentina

Muñiz
- Town
- Location in Greater Buenos Aires
- Coordinates: 34°32′S 58°42′W
- Country: Argentina
- Province: Buenos Aires
- Partido: San Miguel
- Elevation: 23 m (75 ft)

Population (2001 census [INDEC])
  - Total: 26,221
- CPA Base: B 1663
- Area code: +54 11

Muñiz is a town located in San Miguel Partido of Buenos Aires Province, Argentina. It forms part of the urban conurbation of Greater Buenos Aires.
