= Historical culture =

History as reflected in culture

Historical culture is a relatively new concept that encompasses "both material and immaterial culture as well as academic and popular articulations" of history.
