= Los Polvorines =

- Location in Greater Buenos Aires
- Coordinates: 34°30′S 58°42′W
- Country: Argentina
- Province: Buenos Aires
- Partido: Malvinas Argentinas
- Elevation: 22 m (72 ft)

Population (2001 census [INDEC])
  - Total: 53,354
- CPA Base: B 1613
- Area code: +54 11

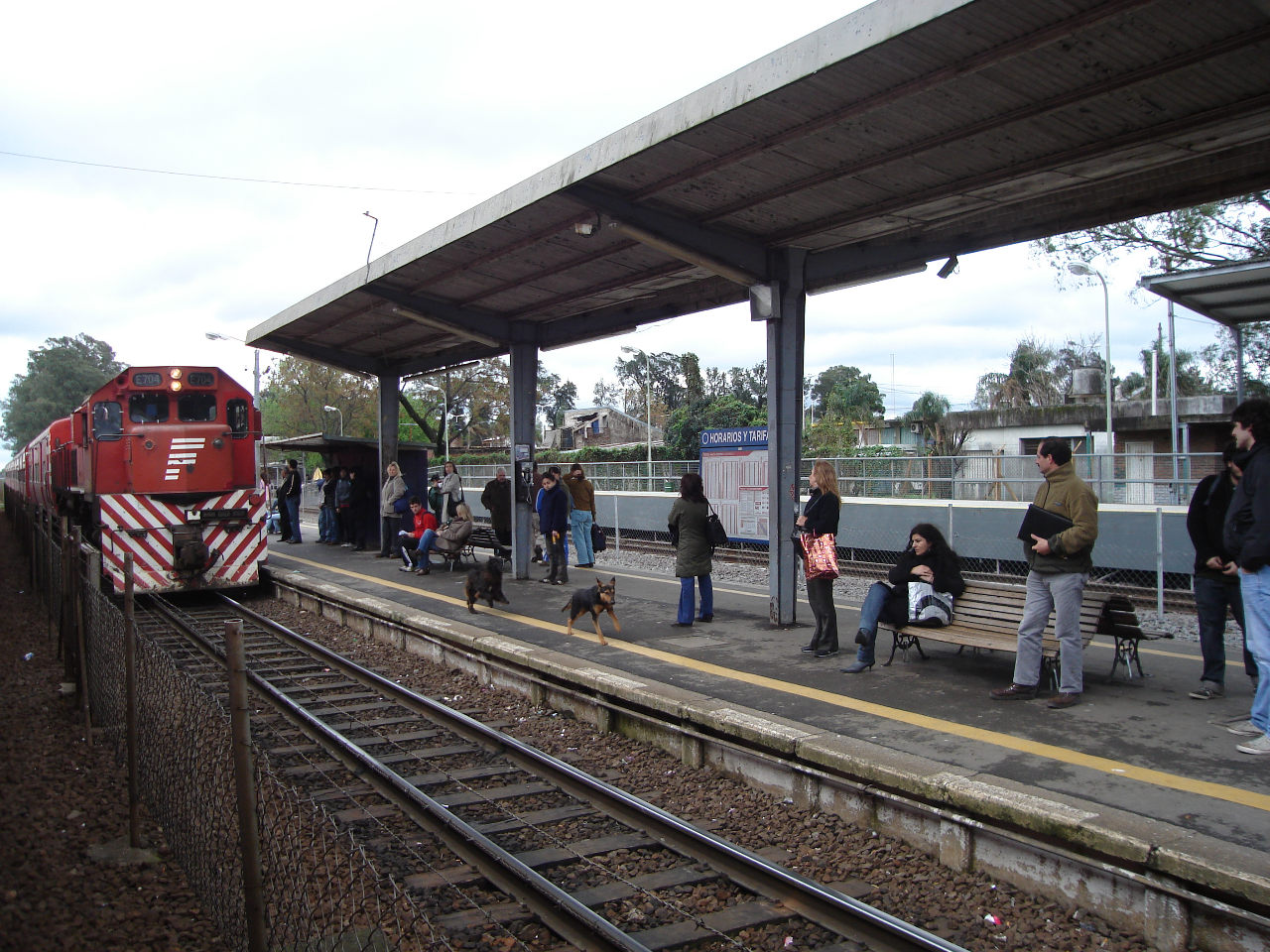
Railway station, Los Polvorines.

Los Polvorines is a district (localidad) in the urban conurbation of Greater Buenos Aires, Argentina. It is the former county seat of Malvinas Argentinas Partido of Buenos Aires Province.
