= La Escuelita =

Defunct nightclub in New York City

- Interactive map of La Escuelita

Restaurant information
- Closed: February 2016
- Previous owner: Savyon Zabar
- Location: 301 West 39th Street, New York, New York, 10018
- Coordinates: 40°45′20″N 73°59′30″W

La Escuelita (transl. "the little school"), also known as simply "Escuelita", was a Latin LGBTQ nightclub in the Hell's Kitchen neighborhood of Manhattan in New York City. At the time of its closure in February 2016, the bar was owned by Savyon Zabar. Queerty described the nightclub as "legendary".

== History ==
La Escuelita was first located on Broadway Avenue and was named after a banner outside of its building reading "The School" (La Escuelita means "the little school" in Spanish). The club did not have a liquor license and was closed after either two or three years. After this first location was shut down, La Escuelita moved to 79th Street and Amsterdam Avenue and then to West 48th Street before settling at 607 Eighth Avenue. This last location was also called La Nueva Escuelita.

MikeQ's Vogue Knights originated at La Nueva Escuelita. These parties provided space for personal expression amongst queer Black and Latinx New Yorkers interested in voguing.

In 2012, the club's liquor license was not renewed after continuing struggles with the New York State Liquor Authority. Its owner, Sayvon Zabar, claimed that denying a liquor license to this primarily LGBTQ+ establishment over minor incidents was attempted gentrification. After a hearing at the New York County Supreme Court, La Escuelita was allowed to remain open. The club closed for good in 2016. In 2017, Zabar, then 54, was strangled to death in his apartment.

== See also ==
- Ball culture
- LGBTQ culture in New York City
