= Peru Township =

Peru Township may refer to:

- Peru Township, LaSalle County, Illinois
- Peru Township, Miami County, Indiana
- Peru Township, Dubuque County, Iowa, in Dubuque County, Iowa
- Peru Township, Huron County, Ohio
- Peru Township, Morrow County, Ohio
