= Dirty War (disambiguation) =

Dirty wars are offensives conducted by regimes against their dissidents, marked by the use of torture and forced disappearance of civilians.

Dirty War may also refer to:

== Specific historical events ==
- Dirty War (Argentina, 1974–1983), period of state-sponsored violence against dissident and other citizens carried out by the military governments of Jorge Rafael Videla and others
- Dirty War (Mexico), 1960s through 1980s internal conflict, between the CIA-backed PRI government and left-wing student and guerrilla groups
- GAL (paramilitary group) (Spain, 1983–1987), illegal death squads established to fight Basque separatist militants
- Years of Lead (Morocco) (1960s–1980s), period of state violence against dissidents under King Hassan II sometimes described as a dirty war
- The Troubles (1968–1998), ethno-nationalist conflict in Northern Ireland sometimes described as a dirty war
- Algerian Civil War (1991–2002), armed conflict between the Algerian Government and Islamist rebel groups, described in French and Arabic as "la sale guerre" and الحرب القذرة

== Other ==
- Dirty Wars, a 2013 documentary film based on Scahill's book
- Dirty War (film), a 2004 British television film about a terrorist attack on central London
- Dirty Wars: The World Is a Battlefield, a 2013 book by Jeremy Scahill about U.S. covert warfare

== See also ==
- Guerra sucia (disambiguation) (Spanish for Dirty War)
- Years of Lead
- Category:Dirty wars
