= Ingeniero Pablo Nogués =

- Town
- Location in Greater Buenos Aires
- Coordinates: 34°28′S 58°46′W
- Country: Argentina
- Province: Buenos Aires
- Partido: Malvinas Argentinas
- Elevation: 20 m (66 ft)

Population (2001 census [INDEC])
  - Total: 38,470
- CPA Base: B 1613
- Area code: +Telephone numbers in Argentina 02320

Ingeniero Pablo Nogués (commonly known as Pablo Nogués) is a town in Malvinas Argentinas Partido of Buenos Aires Province, Argentina. It is located in the north west of the Greater Buenos Aires urban agglomeration.
