= Peru (band) =

American indie rock trio

- Also known as: Peru the Band
- Origin: Long Island, New York, US
- Genres: indie, rock, jazz, motown
- Years active: 2014 – present
- Members: Michael Desmond; Jeremy (Jay) Scalchunes; Tom Costa

Peru (also known as Peru the Band) is an indie rock trio formed in Long Island, New York in 2014. The band released their first single, "I Need You", in early 2015.
