= Villa de Mayo =

- Town
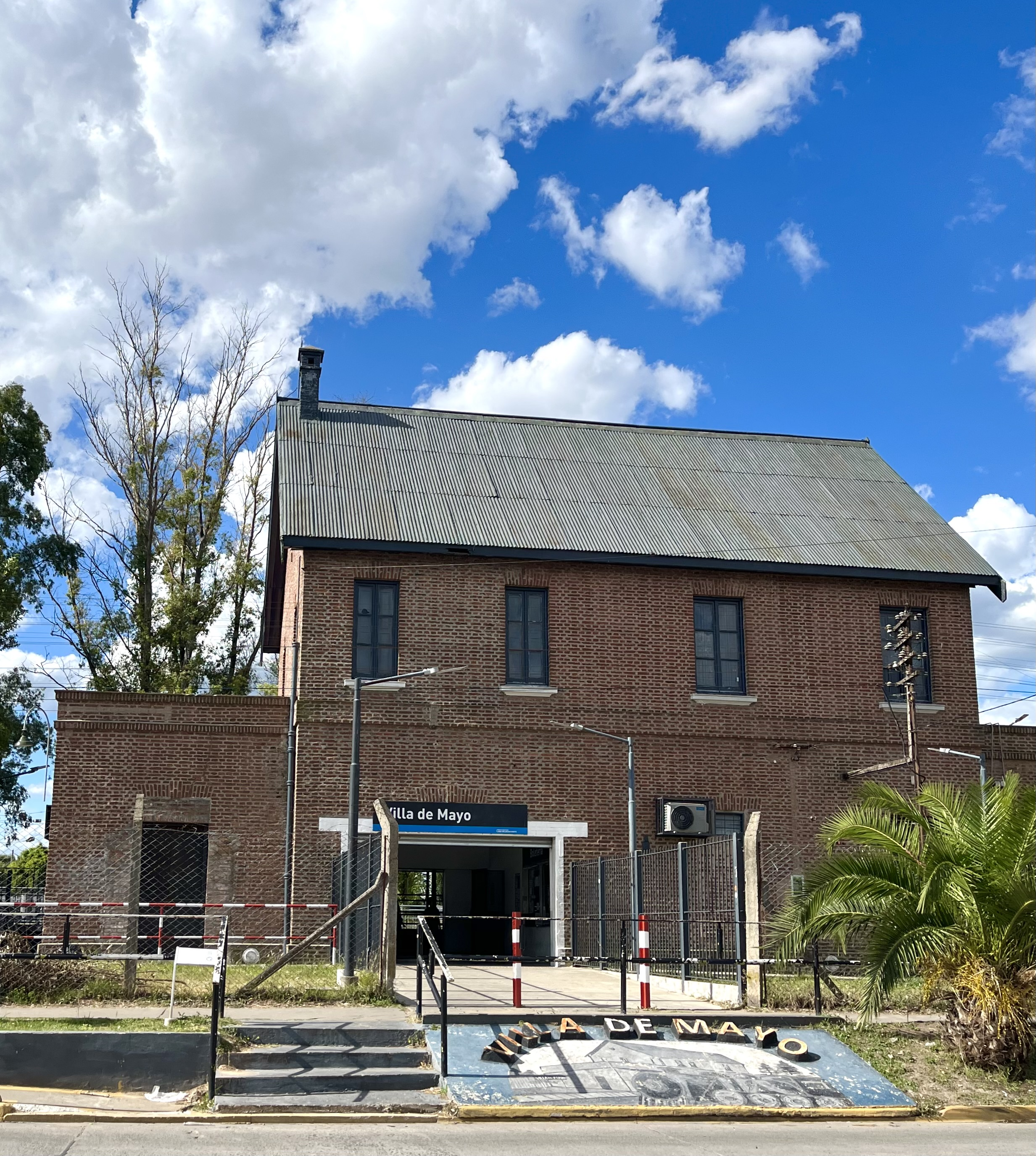
- View of the Villa de Mayo train station

- Location in Greater Buenos Aires
- Coordinates: 34°28′S 58°46′W
- Country: Argentina
- Province: Buenos Aires
- Partido: Malvinas Argentinas
- Elevation: 20 m (66 ft)

Population (2001 census [INDEC])
  - Total: 43,405
- CPA Base: B 1614
- Area code: +54 11

Villa de Mayo is a town in the Malvinas Argentinas Partido of Buenos Aires Province, Argentina. It is located in the north west of Greater Buenos Aires urban conurbation around 39 km from Buenos Aires.
