= Bella Vista, Buenos Aires =

Bella Vista
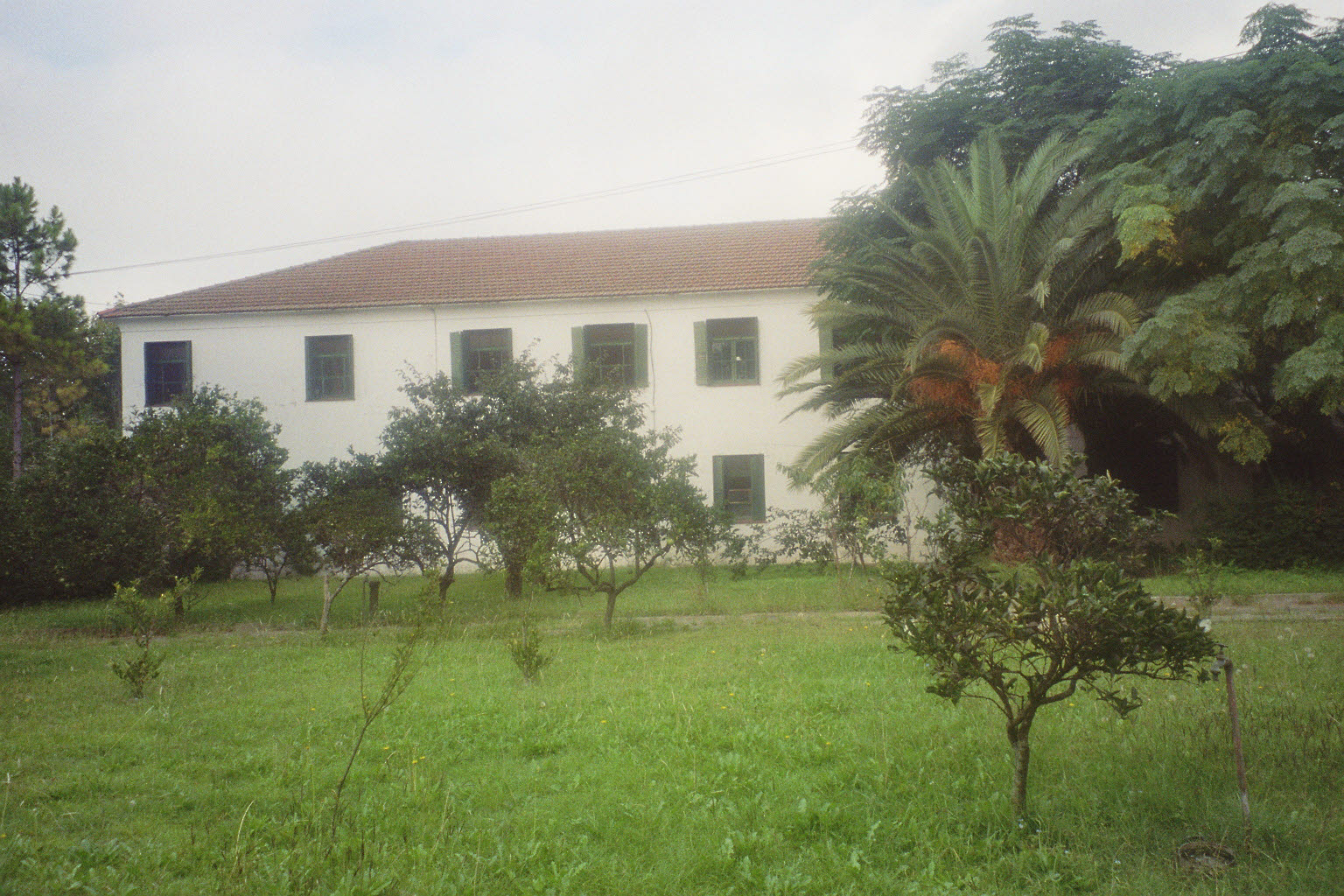
- San Alfonso convent

- Location in Greater Buenos Aires
- Coordinates: 34°32′S 58°40′W
- Country: Argentina
- Province: Buenos Aires
- Partido: San Miguel
- Elevation: 19 m (62 ft)

Population (2001 census [INDEC])
  - Total: 67,936
- CPA Base: B 1661
- Area code: +54 11- 4666/4668

Bella Vista is a localidad (district) in San Miguel Partido which lies at the northwest part of Greater Buenos Aires, Buenos Aires Province, Argentina. Bella Vista is a prosperous residential area, with a small but dynamic commercial zone.

Bella Vista is located at 30 km from Buenos Aires city central business district. It can be reached by car through AU Panamericana or AU del Oeste and AU del Buen Ayre or through routes: 8 (national route), 201 and 23 (both "provinciales"). Another way to go to Bella Vista is by train, through the ex lines "San Martin" and "General Urquiza".

People from Bella Vista are called "Bellavistenses"

The Club de Regatas Bella Vista, one of the most important Rugby Clubs of the URBA (Buenos Aires Rugby Union), the Club Social Bella Vista and the Buenos Aires Golf, are located in this district.

One of its most popular residents is Rodolfo Zapata (popular singer) and his son Rolo Zapata, a well known soccer player and coach.

In 1990, Zapata's family founded Rolo Zapata Soccer Academy in Bella Vista. Currently is one of the elites soccer program in Argentina and United States.

== Climate ==
Bella Vista has a sub-tropical climate with warm humid summers and mild wet winters. Typical summer maxima range from 27 °C to 33 °C. In winter, maxima are between 11 °C and 17 °C.

== Neighbourhoods ==
- Barrio Rafael Obligado
- Mariló
- Lomas de Mariló
- Barrufaldi
- Hogar Obrero o Ferroviario
- Mattaldi
- Barrio Ingeniero Matías Gandulfo
- Barrio Pasman

== Bus Lines and Train Stations ==
Bella Vista has numerous bus lines running through the center and is served with several stations by the Ex San Martin and Ex Urquiza commuter railroad lines, which provide easy access to the capital.

Bella Vista train stations are:

- Bella Vista (Ex Linea San Martin)
- Barrufaldi (Ex linea Urquiza)
- Capitan Lozano (Ex linea Urquiza)
- Tte. Agneta (Ex linea Urquiza)
- Campo de Mayo (Ex linea Urquiza)

== Education ==
Bella Vista is home to a branch of the Universidad de Salta.

State schools include:

- Escuela N° 3 (Primary School)
- Escuela Gral. San Martin (Primary School)
- Adolfo Sourdeaux (Mercadito) (Secondary School)

Private schools include:

- Aberdare College (Kindergarten, Primary and Secondary School) http://aberdare.com.ar
- Colegio Almafuerte (Kindergarten, Primary and Secondary School)
- Colegio Jesús María https://colegiojesusmaria.edu.ar/index.html
- Colegio Las Marias
- Colegio de la Providencia (http://www.colegiodelaprovidencia.edu.ar/)
- Colegio San Alfonso (Kindergarten, Primary and Secondary School)
- Colegio Santa Ethnea (Kindergarten, Primary and Secondary School) http://colegiosantaethnea.com.ar
- Colegio Santos Padres
- Escuela Modelo de Bella Vista (Kindergarten, Primary and Secondary School)
- Glasgow College (Kindergarten, Primary and Secondary School)
- Hogar Escuela Ezpeleta
- Instituto Manuel Dorrego. Barrio Obligado. Bella Vista.(Kindergarten, Primary and Secondary School) http://www.institutodorrego.edu.ar

== Churches ==
- Colegio Ezpeleta (Roman Catholic Church)
- Santa Ana (Roman Catholic Church)
- San Francisco Solano (Roman Catholic Church)
- Pio X (Roman Catholic Church)
- Ex Colegio Don Jaime (Roman Catholic Church)
- Capilla Sagrada Familia (Roman Catholic Church)

== Notable people ==
- Rodolfo Zapata (soccer coach)
