= La Florida, San Luis =

Coordinates: 33°07′S 66°10′W

La Florida (San Luis)
- Municipality and village
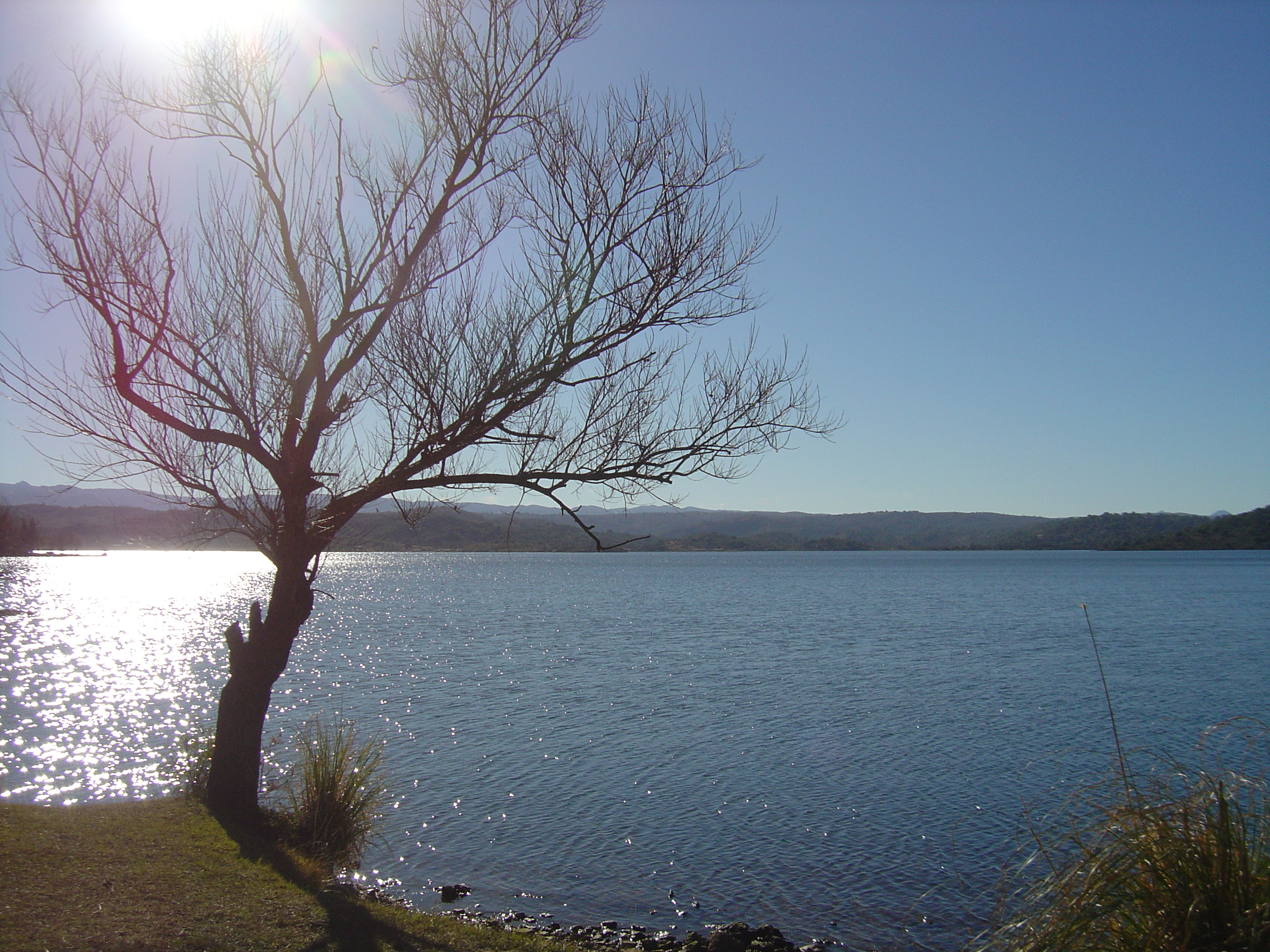
- Interactive map of La Florida (San Luis)
- Country: Argentina
- Province: San Luis Province
- Time zone: UTC−3 (ART)

La Florida (San Luis) is a village and municipality in San Luis Province in central Argentina.
