= El Triángulo =

- Location in Argentina
- Coordinates: 34°30′S 58°41′W
- Country: Argentina
- Province: Buenos Aires
- Partido: Malvinas Argentinas
- Elevation: 2 m (6.6 ft)

Population (2001 census [INDEC])
  - Total: 2,594
- CPA Base: B 1613
- Area code: +54 11

Área de Promoción El Triángulo is a town in Malvinas Argentinas Partido of Buenos Aires Province, Argentina. It is located in the north west of the Greater Buenos Aires urban agglomeration.
