= Malvinas Argentinas Partido =

Malvinas Argentinas Partido Partido de Malvinas Argentinas
- Department
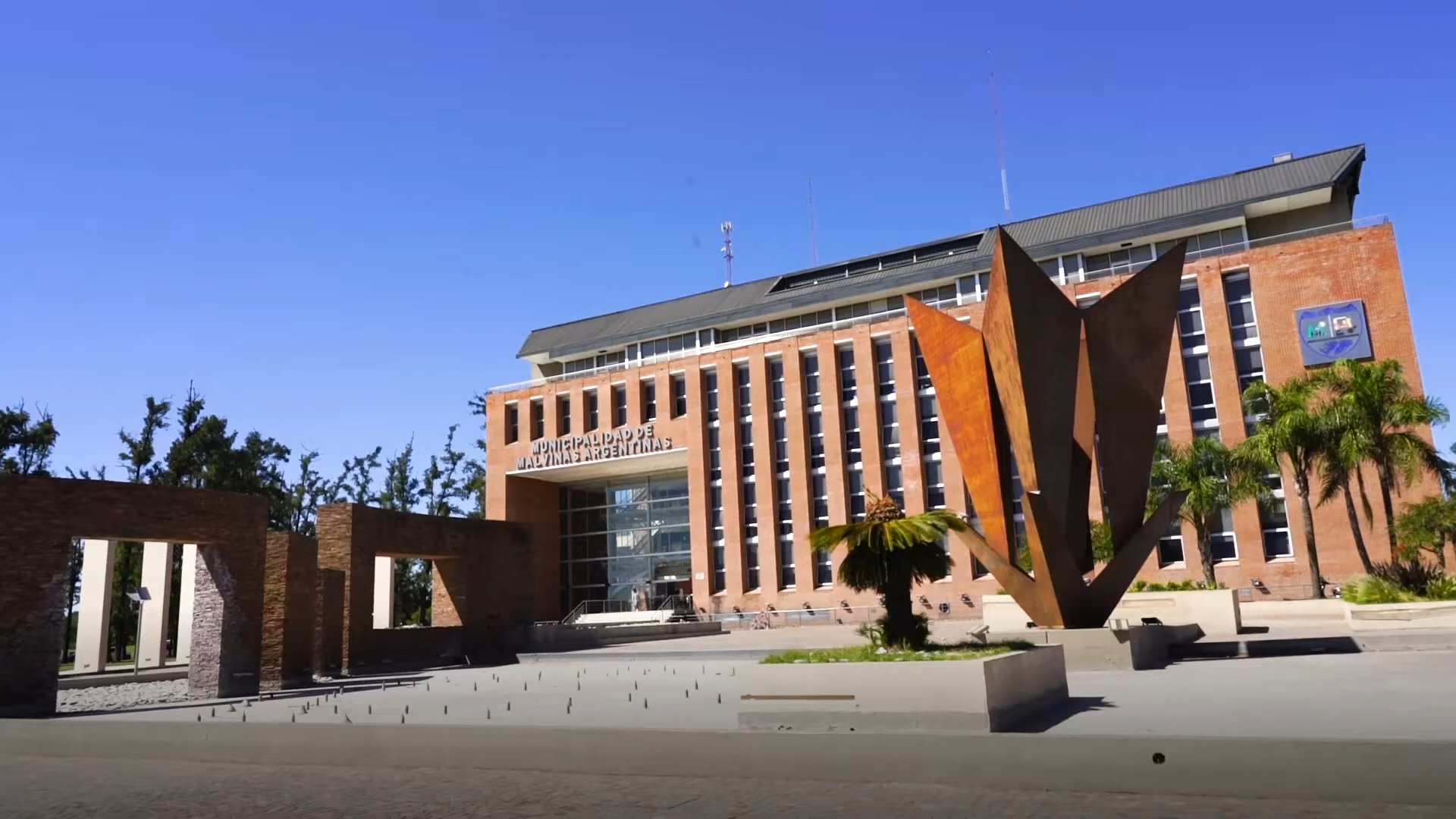
- Municipal building

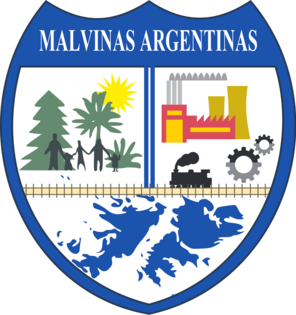
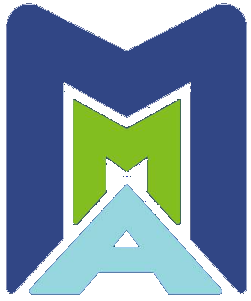
- Seal Logo

- location of Malvinas Argentinas Partido in Gran Buenos Aires
- Coordinates: 34°27′S 58°37.8′W
- Country: Argentina
- Established: October 20, 1994
- Founder: provincial law 11551
- Seat: Malvinas Argentinas

Government
  - Intendant: Leonardo Nardini (PJ)

Area
  - Total: 63.8 km^{2} (24.6 sq mi)

Population
  - Total: 321,833
  - Density: 5,040/km^{2} (13,100/sq mi)
- Demonym: malvinense
- Postal Code: B1613
- IFAM: BUE078
- Area Code: 011
- Website: malvinasargentinas.gob.ar

Malvinas Argentinas Partido is a partido in Buenos Aires Province, Argentina, in the Gran Buenos Aires urban area. It has an area of 63.8 km^{2} (24.6 sq mi) and according to the preliminary results of the 2010 Census, the population was 321,833 inhabitants. (2010 census [INDEC]). Its capital is the city of Malvinas Argentinas, and its largest city is Grand Bourg.

Its name reflects Argentina's disputed claims of sovereignty over the Falkland Islands (Islas Malvinas in Spanish). It was created on October 20, 1994 by Provincial Law #11551, seceding from the partido of General Sarmiento, which was dissolved the following year.

Its former capital, Los Polvorines, was founded on the Ferrocarril General Manuel Belgrano railway, along with the neighboring town of Del Viso. The union of the lands around these two train stations originated the district.

By Decree #4520, the federal government on 17 December 1908, created the train stop Los Polvorines, which name came from the Sargento Cabral munitions depot (polvorín in Spanish), established by the Argentine Army nearby.

== Settlements ==
- Malvinas Argentinas'
- El Triángulo
- Los Polvorines
- Grand Bourg
- Ingeniero Adolfo Sourdeaux
- Ingeniero Pablo Nogués
- Tierras Altas
- Tortuguitas
- Villa de Mayo
