= Perú, La Pampa =

Coordinates: 37°38′S 64°09′W

Perú
- Rural locality and village
- Interactive map of Perú
- Country: Argentina
- Province: La Pampa Province
- Time zone: UTC−3 (ART)

Perú is a village and rural locality (municipality) in La Pampa Province in Argentina.
