= Nueva Galia =

Coordinates: 35°07′S 65°15′W

- Municipality and village
- Interactive map of Nueva Galia
- Country: Argentina
- Province: San Luis Province
- Time zone: UTC−3 (ART)

Nueva Galia is a village and municipality in San Luis Province in central Argentina.
