= San Miguel, Buenos Aires =

City in Buenos Aires Province, Argentina

San Miguel
- City
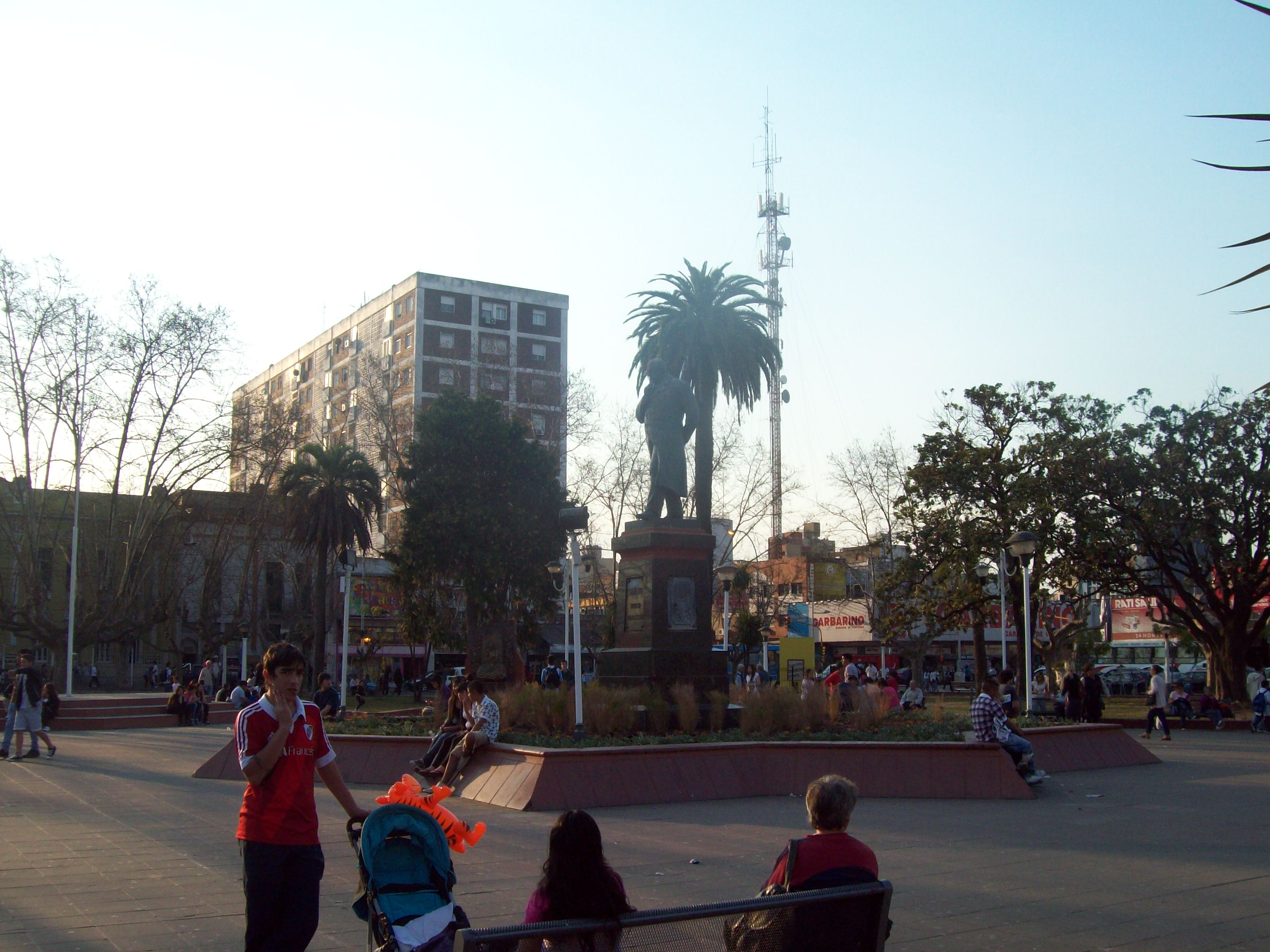
- San Miguel Square

- Location in Greater Buenos Aires
- Coordinates: 34°32′S 58°43′W
- Country: Argentina
- Province: Buenos Aires
- Partido: San Miguel
- Founded: 1864
- Elevation: 28 m (92 ft)

Population (2001 census [INDEC])
  - Total: 157,532
  - Density: 9,845/km^{2} (25,500/sq mi)
- CPA Base: B 1663
- Area code: +54 11

San Miguel is a city in the northwest region of Greater Buenos Aires, 30 km from the City of Buenos Aires. San Miguel is the county seat of San Miguel Partido, and has been a part of Greater Buenos Aires since the early 2000s. The number of inhabitants was 157,532 according to the 2001 census.

Part of a vast estancia estate owned by General Ángel Pacheco, San Miguel was founded as San José del Pilar by a French Argentine agronomist, Adolfo Sourdeaux, on May 18, 1864. Part of Pilar Partido initially, the town was renamed San Miguel after the former district was subdivided shortly afterward. A Buenos Aires-Pacific Railway line was built along the town in 1870, and its first schools were opened at that time as part of President Domingo Sarmiento's program for education in Argentina. The town was designated as county seat for the newly created General Sarmiento Partido in 1889, and was in turn made the county seat for San Miguel Partido when the former was subdivided in 1994. San Miguel's transition from a rural community to that of a suburban bedroom community with high-rise buildings has caused it to lose its village character and strained its infrastructure. The largely service-oriented economy is complemented by industries such as the IPH steel cable facility.

Cable television provider TeleRed broadcasts from San Miguel, covering audiences in most of the Greater Buenos Aires. Its programming includes a local Catholic channel, Señal Santa Marìa, which offers family-friendly content plus religious programmes, mostly from EWTN.

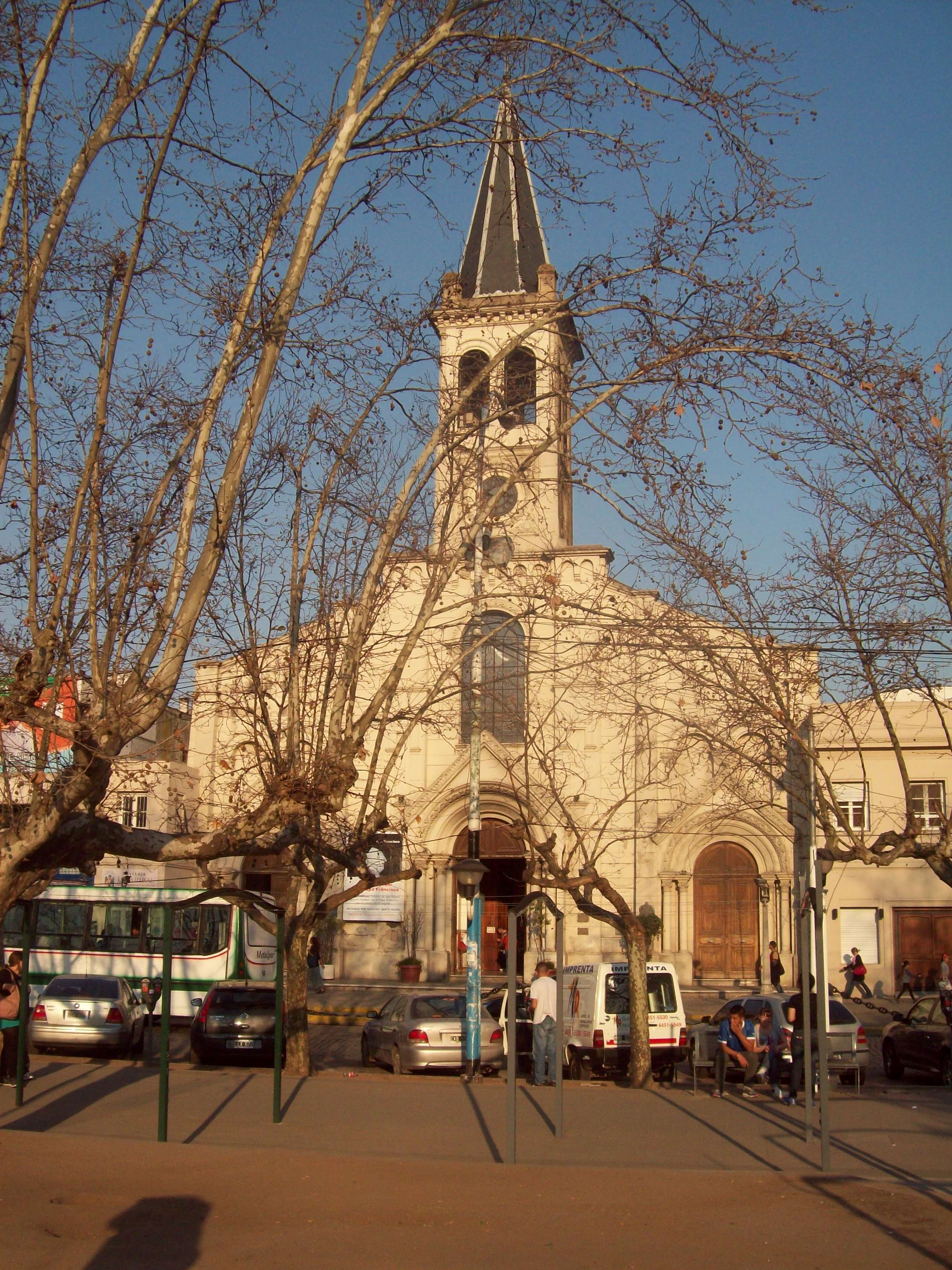
Cathedral of St. Michael Archangel

San Miguel is home to a number of educational institutions, including the National University of General Sarmiento and the parochial Colegio Máximo de San José, from which Jorge Bergoglio (the future Pope Francis) obtained a degree in philosophy.

San Miguel has numerous bus lines running through the center and is served with several stations by the San Martin and Urquiza commuter railroad lines, which provide easy access to Buenos Aires.

== Climate ==
Climate data for San Miguel, Buenos Aires (1991–2020, extremes 1961–2016)
Month	Jan	Feb	Mar	Apr	May	Jun	Jul	Aug	Sep	Oct	Nov	Dec	Year
Record high °C (°F)	40.5 (104.9)	37.6 (99.7)	37.1 (98.8)	33.6 (92.5)	30.0 (86.0)	27.4 (81.3)	30.7 (87.3)	34.0 (93.2)	35.1 (95.2)	34.9 (94.8)	37.2 (99.0)	39.6 (103.3)	40.5 (104.9)
Mean daily maximum °C (°F)	30.1 (86.2)	28.6 (83.5)	26.9 (80.4)	22.9 (73.2)	19.1 (66.4)	16.1 (61.0)	15.4 (59.7)	17.9 (64.2)	19.6 (67.3)	22.6 (72.7)	25.9 (78.6)	28.9 (84.0)	22.8 (73.0)
Daily mean °C (°F)	24.1 (75.4)	22.9 (73.2)	21.0 (69.8)	17.1 (62.8)	13.6 (56.5)	10.9 (51.6)	10.2 (50.4)	12.2 (54.0)	14.1 (57.4)	17.2 (63.0)	20.3 (68.5)	22.9 (73.2)	17.2 (63.0)
Mean daily minimum °C (°F)	18.7 (65.7)	17.9 (64.2)	16.0 (60.8)	12.3 (54.1)	9.4 (48.9)	6.7 (44.1)	5.9 (42.6)	7.2 (45.0)	9.2 (48.6)	12.2 (54.0)	14.7 (58.5)	17.2 (63.0)	12.3 (54.1)
Record low °C (°F)	6.9 (44.4)	5.9 (42.6)	0.9 (33.6)	0.6 (33.1)	−2.6 (27.3)	−7.9 (17.8)	−5.7 (21.7)	−3.5 (25.7)	−2.6 (27.3)	−1.4 (29.5)	1.8 (35.2)	3.5 (38.3)	−7.9 (17.8)
Average precipitation mm (inches)	116.2 (4.57)	130.7 (5.15)	95.4 (3.76)	114.3 (4.50)	69.5 (2.74)	49.8 (1.96)	65.5 (2.58)	64.6 (2.54)	65.0 (2.56)	118.6 (4.67)	120.3 (4.74)	100.9 (3.97)	1,110.8 (43.74)
Average precipitation days (≥ 0.1 mm)	8.3	8.0	7.5	9.6	6.9	6.5	6.7	6.4	7.0	9.3	8.8	8.5	93.5
Average snowy days	0.0	0.0	0.0	0.0	0.0	0.0	0.1	0.1	0.0	0.0	0.0	0.0	0.1
Average relative humidity (%)	68.2	74.0	75.8	79.6	82.5	81.9	80.3	75.8	73.4	72.4	69.2	67.0	75.0
Mean monthly sunshine hours	291.4	234.8	232.5	180.0	167.4	141.0	155.0	176.7	186.0	223.2	261.0	288.3	2,537.3
Mean daily sunshine hours	9.4	8.3	7.5	6.0	5.4	4.7	5.0	5.7	6.2	7.2	8.7	9.3	6.9
Source: Servicio Meteorológico Nacional (September precipitation days 1961–1990)

== Sport ==
The city is home to Club Atlético San Miguel football club.

== Notable people ==
- Bety Nelly Andrés de Levingston (born 1926), de facto First Lady of Argentina between 1970 and 1971.
- Jorge Mangeri (born 1968), child murderer and rapist, known for the murder of Ángeles Rawson in June 2013.
