= San Miguel Partido =

San Miguel Partido de San Miguel
- Department

- location of San Miguel Partido in Gran Buenos Aires
- Coordinates: 34°31′S 58°46′W
- Country: Argentina
- Established: October 20, 1994
- Founder: provincial law 15511
- Seat: San Miguel

Government
  - Intendant: Jaime Méndez (FR)

Area
  - Total: 83 km^{2} (32 sq mi)

Population
  - Total: 281,120
  - Density: 3,400/km^{2} (8,800/sq mi)
- Demonym: sanmiguelino
- Postal Code: B1663
- IFAM: BUE116
- Area Code: 011
- Patron saint: Arcángel San Miguel and Nuestra Señora de Luján

San Miguel Partido is a partido in the Greater Buenos Aires urban area of Buenos Aires Province in Argentina.

Provisional results of the 2010 census report that the provincial subdivision has a population of about 281,120 inhabitants in an area of 83 km^{2} (32 sq mi). Its capital city is San Miguel, which is around 32 km (20 mi) from Buenos Aires.

== Districts ==
- Bella Vista
- Campo de Mayo
- Muñiz
- San Miguel
- Santa María
