= Caseros, Buenos Aires =

City in Buenos Aires Province, Argentina

Caseros
- District
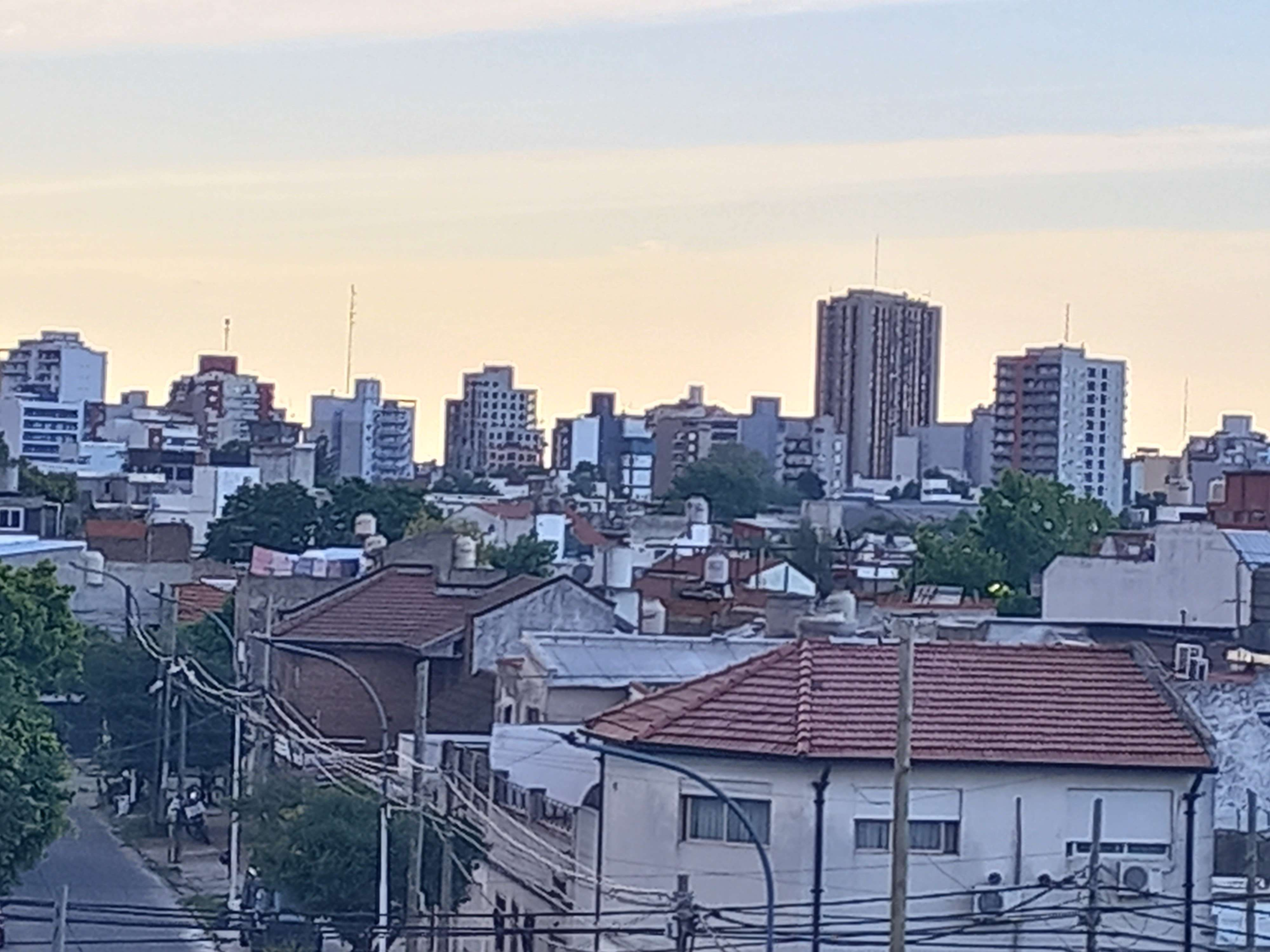

- Location in Greater Buenos Aires
- Coordinates: 34°36′38″S 58°33′45″W
- Country: Argentina
- Province: Buenos Aires
- Partido: Tres de Febrero
- Founded: February 21, 1892
- Elevation: 26.88 m (88.2 ft)

Population (2010 census [INDEC])
  - Total: 95,785
  - Density: 8,552.23/km^{2} (22,150.2/sq mi)
- CPA Base: B 1678
- Area code: +54 011

Caseros is a city in Buenos Aires Province, Argentina. It is the head town of the Tres de Febrero Partido which forms part of the Greater Buenos Aires urban conurbation.

In 1852 the area was the site of an important battle in Argentine history, the Battle of Caseros.

== Toponymy ==
Caseros is the deformation (by locals) of the surname of Diego Casero, who bought land there in 1781.

== History ==
The lands that now belong to the towns of El Palomar and Caseros, Buenos Aires were given by Juan de Garay to Captain Juan Ruiz in the second foundation of Buenos Aires Province on 1580, thus the locals called the place Cañada de Ruiz. There were two camps 1.600 yards wide; [by a league background starting in Río de las Conchas, now Reconquista River]. With the passage of time, and successive sales, had become the property of Isidro Burgos who in 1781 were sold to Diego Casero.

The name of Diego Casero over time was distorted by locals and land called by the name of Caseros.

In 1788 Casero built an edifice for breeding pigeons in what is now the town of El Palomar and whose name it took many years later the local railroad station.

In 1850 acquires lands of Caseros, Manuel Ceferino Lynch Roo, who was married to Ana Espinoza de los Monteros Banfi, daughter of a colonel of the royal armies, 8 years later the widower marries his sister also widow Ignacia Espinosa de los Monteros Banfi. Lynch died in October 1884 and his second wife in 1889.

These places were the scene of the battle fought on February 3, 1852, called Battle of Caseros in the army commanded by the General Urquiza defeated the forces of Juan Manuel de Rosas.

In 1888 Rural Railroad Tramway of Federico Lacroze is enabled (now Ferrocarril General Urquiza) and the Buenos Aires of Pacific Railroad (now Ferrocarril General San Martín) passing through the town from west to east. In the section between Palermo in Buenos Aires city and Pilar in the Northern Zone, there were only two intermediate stations: Caseros and Muñiz.

With the inauguration of the railroad, constructed the first 70 blocks surrounding the Caseros station, delimited by the streets: Lisandro de la Torre, Bonifacini, General Hornos and the Bartolomé Mitre Avenue, thus beginning the consolidation of the first housing nuclei, that would, years later, head town of the Tres de Febrero Partido.

The Rural Tramway after the death of Federico Lacroze (1899) continued later under the command of his son Teófilo Lacroze. This line in 1891 stop being of blood drive and incorporates the steam locomotive, because of this, renamed Ferrocarril Rural de la Provincia de Buenos Aires. Is also enabled then Caseros station, renamed to Martín Coronado station.

The official date of foundation of Caseros was on 21 February 1892.

In March 1896 opens in a property of Luis Cavassa (a local), School No. 12. This worked since February 1893 in San Martín as No. 8 and was moved to Caseros since the school population had increased considerably. It began operations in its new location on 26 March 1896 under the direction of María Silva until 1 July 1896 that took Ms. Arminda Baker Baldini (1864-1933).

As a first settler family in the area, is conceptualized to Cafferata, who arrived in 1861, leasing the land where the battle of 1853 took place, which were kept as souvenirs weapons and ammunition found to work the land.

At the time of opening the school No. 12 were locals families: Cavassa, Raceeto, Ferro, Merlo, Sabarot, Candela, Medina, Cafferata, Gosso, Vexina and Guisulpo. Luis Cavassa is credited with being the first grocer located in the current Libertador San Martín Avenue and Valentín Gómez. The first store and haberdashery was of Joaquín Mendoza in 1905, the first shoe store was of Santiago Chiavasco. Chiavasco is then devoted to the business of land, put an auction house would later be moved to Santos Lugares. The first doctor living in Caseros was Dr. Garcia.

In 1908 opened the first Mail. December 6, 1911, opened the Registry Office, in 1912 José Gioia was authorized to provide the appropriate number plates to the streets.

In 1939 the Scout Group Sargento Cabral of Caseros, is created based on the municipal seat. He is currently the No. 93 Group Scout Argentina Civil Association.

As for sport, Caseros at one time had two football stadiums, a few blocks apart: One in the Lisandro de la Torre street and Urquiza avenue, and the other in the Municipal Sports Center. The first belongs to the Club Atlético Estudiantes, a team playing in the Primera B Nacional. Their stadium has a capacity for 17,000 people. The other team is the Justo José de Urquiza (formally Asociación Social y Deportiva Justo José de Urquiza). This team played until 1993 in Caseros, when it moved to Loma Hermosa, also in Tres de Febrero Partido. Their stadium has a capacity for 2,500 people. This team plays in the Primera C.

In 1995 is created the Universidad Nacional de Tres de Febrero (UNTreF), which is headquartered in Valentín Gómez street, opposite the Caseros Station and currently has around 13.000 students, with a variety of bachelor's degrees to choose.

== Governance ==
The locality of Caseros like 15 locality of Tres de Febrero Partido are by the mayor Hugo Omar Curto (Now for the political party peronist: Frente para la Victoria) since 1991, winning the 6 times consecutive municipal elections.

=== Elections 2011 ===
In the elections of 2011 Hugo Curto won his sixth term until December 10, 2015, with 45,18% of the vote (86.573 votes); in second place was the Broad Progressive Front (Frente Amplio Progresista) with 24.846 votes (12,97%), in third place was the Union for Social Development (Unión para el desarrollo social) with 22.684 votes (11,84%).

== Economy ==
After the late 1990 the destruction of local industry noted, to the point of causing high levels of unemployment, poverty and emigration. Its proximity to the Buenos Aires city served as a strategic point for people seeking the quiet of the suburbs, until then, this city did not have large buildings. The town, like much of the western suburbs, experienced strong industrialization process due to the economic recovery. Its traditional industry was producing cars PSA Peugeot Citroën Group, which was joined centers manufacture of personal hygiene and cleanliness of Unilever, Procter & Gamble and multiple local factories; auto parts manufacturing, metallurgy, food and machinery. Other sectors that experienced significant growth were construction and the financial sector: The real estate boom began to feel a year from 2005 in which they slowly began to be residential and office towers, also constructed as hypermarkets Easy, Walmart and others. The financial sector experienced growth never before seen in the locality, which began to settle large branches of major banks HSBC, Banco Santander, Nuevo Banco de Santa Fe, Banco Galicia, Banco Credicoop, Standard Bank, Banco Comafi Argentina, Banco Patagonia, BBVA Banco Francés among others. As the administrative center of the partido, it has Banco Provincia, Banks ANSeS and Banco de la Nación Argentina.

== Population ==
The population of Caseros according to Census of October 2010 amounted to 95.785 inhabitants. The total fertility rate locality is 1.93 children for woman.

According to estimates of INDEC, the population aged 65 or more correspond to 13.4% of total and 60 years or more, 16.1% glimpsing an aging population structure of the town. In turn, the population aged 0–14 years, accounting for 23.7% of the total.

Caseros in 2001 had 90.313 inhabitants, amounting in the year 2010 to 95.785 inhabitants, i.e. its population grew only 0,09%. Its density increased from 8,063.66 people per km^{2} (20,905.79 per sq mi) to 8,552.23 people per km^{2} (22,172,35 per sq mi).

27.62% of the population are foreigners, mainly from Uruguay, Italy, Spain, and Paraguay. Migrants are also inside the country.

Poverty affects 11.27% of the population of the town, mainly young people from other provinces.

The population of the locality is 28.17% of the total population of Tres de Febrero Partido, while in 2001 accounted for 26.84% of the population of the partido.

In the second half of 2012, according to the organization civil society TECHO, between 3 and 5 informal settlements. An estimated 15,600 live in them people, that is where the greatest amount of uncertainty is created by generating great concern especially in the area of Villa Alianza where the highest rate of violent robberies in the locality.

== Education ==
Currently Caseros has 25 schools (public and private); a School Site Council (all belonging to the Tres de Febrero Partido) located on Andrés Ferreyra street, and the University of Tres de Febrero.

== Geography ==
The town of Caseros has an area of 11,2 km² (4,32 sq mi) representing 24,35% of the total area of Tres de Febrero Partido.

Its boundaries are: Railroad Metrovías Routes; Streets: Fray Justo Santa María de Oro, Las Gaviotas, Fray Mamerto Esquiú, Antonio de la Vega, Presidente Juan Domingo Perón, Aviadora Lorenzini, Misiones, Marconi, República Avenue, Marcelo T de Alvear Avenue, Justo José de Urquiza Avenue, Lisandro de la Torre, Bonifacini, Asamblea and A. Williams.

Bordered on the north by the Partido of General San Martín, northeast to the locality of Santos Lugares, east to the locality of José Ingenieros, southeast to the locality of Ciudadela, south to the Partido of Morón, west to the locality of Ciudad Jardín and the locality of Martín Coronado and northwest to the locality of Villa Bosch.

The geographical center of the locality is at the intersection of Libertador San Martín avenue and Justo José de Urquiza avenue. But the main street of this town is Tres de Febrero, where innumerable stores selling clothes, business kiosks, the theater reopened, bars, bookstores, toy stores and companies among others are.

=== Climate ===
The climate is temperate pampas. Presents temperate hot summers and cool winters, sufficient rainfall and in some cases generating strong floods, and prevailing winds from the east and northeast.

Caseros

Climate chart (precipitation, max. and min. temperature)
J	F	M	A	M	J	J	A	S	O	N	D
110 30 17	134 28 16	141 24 15	104 21 11	77 19 8	73 16 5	66 14 4	69 15 6	72 19 9	113 22 10	106 25 14	97 28 17
- █ Average max. and min. temperatures in °C
- █ Precipitation totals in mm
- Source: SMN
Imperial conversion
J	F	M	A	M	J	J	A	S	O	N	D
4.3 86 63	5.3 82 61	5.6 75 59	4.1 70 52	3 66 46	2.9 61 41	2.6 57 39	2.7 59 43	2.8 66 48	4.4 72 50	4.2 77 57	3.8 82 63
- █ Average max. and min. temperatures in °F
- █ Precipitation totals in inches

=== Snowfall ===
During days 6, 7 and 8 July 2007, saw the entry of polar cold air mass as a result of this on Monday 9 July, the simultaneous presence of very cold air in both middle levels of the atmosphere and at the surface, leading to the occurrence of precipitation in the form of sleet and snow. It was the third time that we have a snowfall record in the locality, in earlier times were the years 1912 and 1918.

=== Seismicity ===
The region responds to the "Subfalla the Parana River" and "Subfalla River Plate", with low seismicity, and its ultimate expression occurred on June 5, 1888 at 3:20 UTC−3, with a probable magnitude of 5.0 on the Richter scale. Municipal Civil Defense must listen and obey warn about

Area

- Low seismicity
- Severe storms

== Sports ==
Caseros has three sports centers where people can practice different types of disciplines, including swimming, athletics and football. The Centers are Ce.De.M. Number 1, Ce.De.M. Number 2 and the Ce.F. in which schools also use it to students to make physical education. Caseros also has its football club Club Atlético Estudiantes, is currently participating in the tournament Nacional B and the club not only practiced football, but also there are a lot of disciplines. The club has a great friendship with Argentino de Rosario and Montevideo Wanderers Fútbol Club. Its historical rival is Almagro who dispute the classic Tres de Febrero, one of the most important Greater Buenos Aires.

Caseros also has different leagues and schools that work with dozens of participants, have added several cultural venues as the game is referred to as the national capital of sport.

== Culture ==
As for cultural Caseros is known for its many murals, as majority painted by Martín Ron (a well-known local artist).

== Media ==
Caseros has three local FM radio stations; the most recognizable is the Radio 91.5 Caseros transmitted from Andrés Ferreyra street. Other stations are responsible basically put music and briefly news. Radio Caseros is characterized by its cultural content.

Caseros also has a local TV cable and numerous online journals that are responsible for local and national news.

== Notable people ==
- Marcela Acuña, boxer
- Osvaldo Civile, heavy metal guitarist
- Leopoldo Galtieri, Argentine dictator in the early 1980s

== See also ==
- Battle of Caseros
