= Churruca (disambiguation) =

Cosme Damián Churruca (1761–1805) was a Spanish naval officer. Churruca may also refer to:

== People ==
- Agustín Churruca (born 1952), Spanish field hockey player
- Ana Nieto Churruca (born 1961), Spanish writer
- Evaristo de Churruca y Brunet (1841–1917), Spanish engineer
- Francisco Churruca (born 1936), Spanish jai alai player
- José Ignacio Churruca (born 1949), Spanish footballer

== Places ==
- Churruca, Argentina

== Transport ==
- Churruca-class destroyer (1927), destroyer class of the Spanish Navy
- Churruca-class destroyer (1972), destroyer class of the Spanish Navy

== See also ==
- Curruca, genus of birds
