= Agustín Cardozo (footballer, born 1998) =

Argentine professional footballer

Personal information
- Full name: Lucas Agustín Cardozo
- Date of birth: 13 July 1998 (age 28)
- Place of birth: Merlo, Argentina
- Height: 1.73 m (5 ft 8 in)
- Position: Forward

Youth career
- Deportivo Merlo
- All Boys

Senior career*
Years	Team	Apps	(Gls)
2019	All Boys	7	(0)
2020	Atenas	0	(0)
2021	JJ Urquiza	4	(0)
- * Club domestic league appearances and goals as of 19:18, 8 August 2022 (UTC)

Lucas Agustín Cardozo (born 13 July 1998) is an Argentine professional footballer who plays as a forward.

== Career ==
Cardozo joined All Boys' academy from Deportivo Merlo. Pablo Solchaga picked Cardozo for his professional bow on 25 February 2019 in Primera B Metropolitana, as the forward came off the substitutes bench in place of Lucas Nicchiarelli as the match with Justo José de Urquiza ended as a draw. A further sub appearance arrived against Colegiales, before he played as a starter for the first time in March versus Comunicaciones. Cardozo was released at the end of 2019. He subsequently joined Atenas of the Uruguayan Segunda División.

== Career statistics ==
As of 23 June 2020.

Appearances and goals by club, season and competition
Club	Season	League			Cup		Continental		Other		Total	
Club	Season	Division	Apps	Goals	Apps	Goals	Apps	Goals	Apps	Goals	Apps	Goals
All Boys	2018–19	Primera B Metropolitana	4	0	0	0	—		0	0	4	0
All Boys	2019–20	Primera B Nacional	3	0	0	0	—		0	0	3	0
All Boys	Total		7	0	0	0	—		0	0	7	0
Atenas	2020	Segunda División	0	0	—		—		0	0	0	0
Career total			7	0	0	0	—		0	0	7	0
