= Agustín Cardozo =

Agustín Cardozo may refer to:

- Agustín Cardozo (footballer, born 1997), Argentine midfielder
- Agustín Cardozo (footballer, born 1998), Argentine forward
