= Lucas Chávez =

Lucas Chávez may refer to:

- Lucas Chaves, Argentine footballer (born 1995)
- Lucas Chávez (Bolivian footballer) (born 2003)
- Lucas Chávez (volleyball) (born 1982)
