= Tres de Febrero Partido =

Partido in Buenos Aires Province, Argentina

Tres de Febrero
- Department
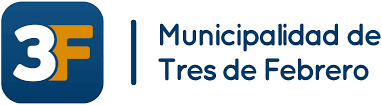

- Location of Tres de Febrero Partido in Buenos Aires Province
- Coordinates: 34°35′53″S 58°33′54″W
- Country: Argentina
- Province: Buenos Aires
- Established: 15 October 1959
- Founder: Provincial law
- Seat: Caseros

Government
  - Intendant: Rodrigo Aybar (LLA)

Area
  - Total: 46 km^{2} (18 sq mi)

Population (2010)
  - Total: 340,071
  - Density: 7,400/km^{2} (19,000/sq mi)
- Demonym: tresfebrerense
- Postal Code: B1678
- IFAM: BUE128
- Area Code: +54 011
- Patron saint: Nuestra Señora de la Merced
- Website: tresdefebrero.gov.ar

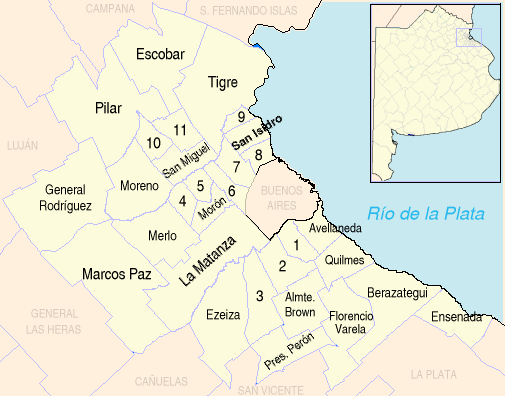
Partidos of Greater Buenos Aires: Tres de Febrero: 6

Tres de Febrero (lit. '3 February') is a partido of the Greater Buenos Aires conurbation area in the Buenos Aires Province, Argentina.

== Toponymy ==
Tres de Febrero took its name from the 1852 Battle of Caseros between General Justo José Urquiza and Juan Manuel de Rosas, which was won by General Urquiza and marked a historical event for the country and which took place on this land.

== History ==
The lands that now comprise the Tres de Febrero Partido were inhabited by Querandí Indians before the discovery of the Americas and during the early years of the conquest. These indigenous people preferred to set their huts near watercourses, particularly along the current Reconquista River and the Morón, Maldonado, and Medrano streams. They cultivated corn, squash and bean. Upon the arrival of the Spaniards, the indigenous people fought tenaciously to defend their possessions but were ultimately defeated and had to submit to the conquerors.

The distribution of lands began with the second foundation of Buenos Aires by Juan de Garay in 1580, marking the beginning of the settlement and urbanization process in the area now known as the Metropolitan Area of Buenos Aires. The urbanization of Tres de Febrero Partido, while having specific characteristics, shares broader aspects of development with the majority of Greater Buenos Aires. Juan de Garay's land grants included "solars" (lots for houses), farms, and estates surrounding villages for growing vegetables, cereal, and dairy production. Until the early 20th century, the area functioned as a supplier of agricultural products to Buenos Aires. In the early 18th century, this area, formerly known as Pago de las Conchas, was renamed the Curato de San Isidro, encompassing the current partidos of San Martín, San Isidro, Tres de Febrero, and Vicente López. Circulation was facilitated by old highways connecting the area with La Matanza Partido, Morón Partido, Luján, and Buenos Aires. The installation of the railroad in 1876 spurred the first urban settlements.

Around the same time, the Lacroze brothers introduced a rural tram system, which became electric in 1908. This tramway started from the intersection of Medrano and Corrientes streets and extended to the village of San Martín. Alongside the low property costs in the area, the tramway significantly stimulated demographic settlement.

Until the late 1800s, the only railroad station in the partido was Caseros Station, around which administrative offices, homes, and shops of zonal importance were established. Starting in the early 1900s, new railroad stations were created, leading to the development of other primarily residential areas such as Santos Lugares (1906), Ciudadela (1910), and Sáenz Peña (1910).

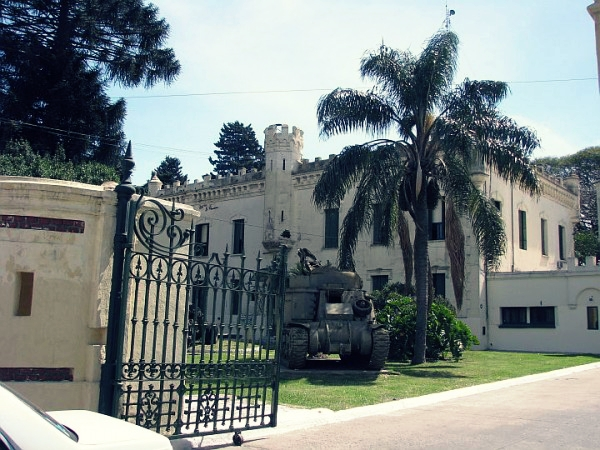
Museum of the Argentine Army, former military barracks in Ciudadela.

In June 1920, the Argentine Red Cross established its Santos Lugares branch at 3670 Severino Langeri Street, providing relief and assistance to the immediate community of Santos Lugares and the entire partido. This institution became renowned for its distinguished doctors, such as Cerazo, Carbone, and Canepa.

Until the 1930s, the development of settlements was primarily driven by the expansion of the railroad service and passenger transport, including the introduction of buses (el colectivo) in Buenos Aires in 1930. As these transport services penetrated Greater Buenos Aires, industrial settlements and housing developments began to emerge in areas remote from or between railroad stations.

The urbanization of the partido was completed between 1970 and 1972 with the fragmentation and subdivision of vacant areas to the northwest, including Loma Hermosa, El Libertador, Churruca, Remedios de Escalada and Once de Septiembre. Additionally, the influence of military settlements, such as Campo de Mayo and Ciudadela from 1901 and the opening of the Colegio Militar de la Nación in 1937, which now comprise 12% of the partido's area, played a significant role in the stages of settlement.

In 1958, deputy Alfredo Longo, (born in Caseros), presented a project for the creation of a new partido called "Caseros", composed of the localities of Santos Lugares, Ciudadela, Sáenz Peña, El Palomar and Caseros, which was completed the following year with the enactment of Law 6.065 of Buenos Aires Province by which the October 15 partido was created Tres de Febrero, separating of the San Martín partido, in the area bounded by General Paz avenue, Ferrocarril General Urquiza, Triunvirato street to the Reconquista River, the Reconquista River to Díaz Vélez avenue and thence to the General Paz avenue.

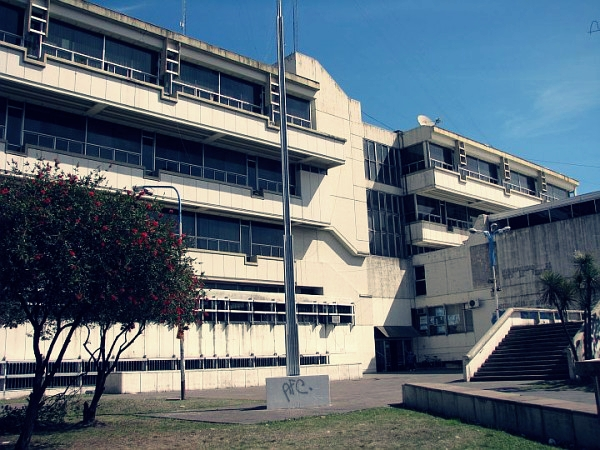
Municipality of Tres de Febrero.

The municipality of Tres de Febrero began its economic financial year and servicing in general from 1 January 1960 based on the previous quartermaster located at 2161 Lisandro Medina, Caseros. Its first mayor was Mr. Ramón Landin who was ousted in 1962 by soldiers of the time. The name Tres de Febrero is because on this date in 1852 was performed the Battle of Caseros between the forces of Juan Manuel de Rosas and the General Urquiza, in the lands that belong to this partido.

When in October 1959 was created the partido, one of the biggest obstacles they faced their authorities was a lack of building facilities capable of accommodating the different agencies were integrated was created, which were shortly after dispersed in fourteen different sites. This brought great inconvenience, and in 1967, the authorities decided to move forward on an old dream: The Municipal Edifice. Was negotiated with Ferrocarriles Argentinos to use the land adjacent to the tracks, among the streets General Hornos and Juan Bautista Alberdi. In 1968 when were resolved the issue of the place occupied, a concourse was held to the presentation of projects, He was elected work of architects Odilia Suárez and Eduardo Sarrailh. According to the rules, the set should embody a coherent urban image and with this premise was created the general structure of the set, which among other works, envisaged a walkway under the tracks, a shopping mall, banks, church and cultural center. Work started in 1969, being in charge of the company Sucesión Carlos Rinadi, which soon after went bankrupt, fact that produced long delays in the initial schedule. 14 years passed, during which the works were interrupted several times by different causes. In 1983 under the quartermaster Rodolfo Vasquez's office removals occurred Mayor, time the edifice was called by the name of "Heroes de Malvinas" as a tribute to those who gave their lives in the Falklands War; and is in 1987, when the Concejo Deliberante went to take his place, leaving the former headquarters of the street Lisandro Medina, now demolished, and had been primary site of the first mayors. Architecturally the edifice is composed of a set of volumetric forms of exposed concrete, checking various parameters carpentry aluminum. It is noteworthy that the original project underwent many changes, although with the passing of time some of the original estimates it will specifying, as in the case of the street parallel to the roads that join General Hornos with Libertador San Martín Avenue.

In February 1988 Tunnel of Libertador San Martín avenue in central Caseros opens. The low-level step had its ribbon cutting shared between two mayors: Héctor Dáttoli and Jorge Mangas. When installing the tunnel initially hurt businesses Valentin Gómez street. Since this was the most coveted street of partido, and installed a water source to attract the public, but was soon removed because stalking was inevitable.

== Governance ==
The partido of Tres de Febrero is governed by mayor Diego Valenzuela. He defeated the historic Peronist mayor Hugo Omar Curto in 2015 who had governed Tres de Febrero since 1991. Though seen as an underdog, Valenzuela squeezed a victory in his re-election bid in 2019

=== Mayors ===
List of mayors who ruled Tres de Febrero and their respective periods:

1. Commissioner Martín Jorge Lasarte (01/01/1960-04/30/1960)
2. Mayor Ramón Landin (05/01/1960-04/30/1962)
3. Commissioner Arnaldo A. Barbieri (04/30/1962-11/30/1962)
4. Commissioner Manuel R. Fernández (11/30/1962-05/16/1963)
5. Commissioner Coronel Gabriel Larralde (05/16/1963-10/11/1963)
6. Mayor Roberto Antonio D'Elia (10/12/1963-06/30/1966)
7. Commissioner Coronel Ermeife Graselli (06/30/1966-07/15/1966)
8. Mayor Coronel Gabriel Larralde (07/15/1966-02/20/1969)
9. Mayor Interino Coronel Héctor Kummer (02/21/1969-04/10/1969)
10. Mayor Rómulo E. Repetto (04/10/1969-03/18/1971)
11. Mayor Interim Horacio W. Chaves (03/18/1971-05/06/1971)
12. Mayor Antonio Diconsolo (05/06/1971-09/17/1971)
13. Mayor Enrique León Dí Almonte (09/17/1971-11/02/1971)
14. Mayor Arturo Bombelli (01/21/1971-05/25/1973)
15. Mayor Roberto Manuel Heredia (05/25/1973-08/10/1975)r
16. Mayor Rubén Darío Novoa (08/10/1975-03/24/1976)
17. Mayor Interim Coronel Dardo Gilva (03/24/1976-04/30/1976)
18. Mayor Coronel Raúl Schweiser (04/30/1976-05/15/1981)
19. Mayor Rodolfo Vázquez (05/15/1981-12/10/1983)
20. Mayor Héctor Roberto Dátoli (12/10/1983-12/10/1987)
21. Mayor Jorge N. Mangas (12/10/1987-12/10/1991)
22. Mayor Hugo Omar Curto (12/10/1991-12/10/1995)
23. Mayor Hugo Omar Curto (12/10/1995-12/10/1999)
24. Mayor Hugo Omar Curto (12/10/1999-12/10/2003)
25. Mayor Hugo Omar Curto (12/10/2003-12/10/2007)
26. Mayor Hugo Omar Curto (12/10/2007-12/10/2011)
27. Mayor Hugo Omar Curto (12/10/2011-12/10/2015)
28. Mayor Diego Valenzuela (12/10/2015–12/10/2019)
29. Mayor Diego Valenzuela (12/10/2019–12/10/2023)
30. Mayor Diego Valenzuela (12/10/2023–present)

=== Elections 2011 ===
In the elections of 2011 Hugo Curto won his sixth term with 45,18% of the vote (86.573 votes); in second place was the Broad Progressive Front (Frente Amplio Progresista) with 24.846 votes (12,97%), in third place was the Union for Social Development (Unión para el desarrollo social) with 22.684 votes (11,84%).

=== Elections 2013 ===
The October 2013 elections were held to define: deputies, senators and councilors. Striking thing was the defeat of Frente para la Victoria. In Tres de Febrero Partido in the list in which were chosen 12 councilors and 4 school counselors, won the Frente Renovador with 46,46% of the vote (96.177 votes). Submitting councilors (6): Martín Jofre, Diego Achilli, Susana Berisso, Raul Mazzeo, Julio Candia and Dora Aguilera. The Frente para la Victoria obtained 28,38% of the vote (58.742 votes). Submitting as councilors (4): Marta Curto, Osvaldo Santoro, Máximo Rodríguez and La Tigresa Acuña.

Third was the Frente Progresista Cívico y Social with 11,82% of the vote (24.468 votes), entering two councilors. The fourth place went to the Frente de izquierda y de los trabajadores (Left Front and Workers) with 16.846 votes (8,14%) and fifth Unidos por la Libertad y el Trabajo (United for Freedom and Labour) with 10.786 votes (5,21%).

These elections put on alert as Hugo Curto could be defeated in his next election in 2015.

== Geography ==
The partido has an area of 46 km^{2} (18 sq mi), it is the 4th-smallest partido in Buenos Aires.

The Tres de Febrero partido occupies only 0.01% of the surface of the Republic Argentina and accounts for 1.2% of the total population.

It is northeast of the Buenos Aires Province, is one of its 135 partidos. This integrated of urban conglomeration of Greater Buenos Aires.

Its roughly rectangular shape, is oriented in the direction from northwest to southeast, is west of the Buenos Aires city, which separates the General Paz Avenue. On the north, it borders the General San Martin Partido separates Triunvirato Avenue, General Lavalle and ways of Ferrocarril General Urquiza. The records defined separation northeast with the Reconquista River, natural boundary with the San Miguel Partido. Meanwhile, to the south borders the partides of Morón, Hurlingham and La Matanza are separated by a number of streets and avenues.

Data for locality
Locality	Population 2001	Population 2010	Area	Density
Caseros	90.313	95.785	11,2 km^{2}	8.552,23 inhabitants/km^{2}
Churruca	5.784	4.099	0,4 km^{2}	10.247,50 inhabitants/km^{2}
Ciudad Jardín	17.605	16.317	2,4 km^{2}	6.798,75 inhabitants/km^{2}
Ciudadela	73.155	73.031	6,8 km^{2}	10.739,85 inhabitants/km^{2}
El Libertador	15.108	15.027	1,3 km^{2}	11.559,23 inhabitants/km^{2}
José Ingenieros	7.223	8.208	1,1 km^{2}	7.461,81 inhabitants/km^{2}
Loma Hermosa	17.960	18.479	3,0 km^{2}	6.159,67 inhabitants/km^{2}
Martín Coronado	19.121	17.090	2,3 km^{2}	7.430,43 inhabitants/km^{2}
Once de Septiembre	4.355	6.366	0,6 km^{2}	10.610,00 inhabitants/km^{2}
Pablo Podestá	12.852	12.762	1,4 km^{2}	9.115,71 inhabitants/km^{2}
Remedios de Escalada	11.860	13.753	0,9 km^{2}	15.281,11 inhabitants/km^{2}
Sáenz Peña	11.542	12.258	1,2 km^{2}	10.215,00 inhabitants/km^{2}
Santos Lugares	17.023	16.526	3,2 km^{2}	5.164,37 inhabitants/km^{2}
Villa Bosch	24.702	23.323	2,6 km^{2}	8.970,38 inhabitants/km^{2}
Villa Raffo	7.864	7.046	0,9 km^{2}	7.828,89 inhabitants/km^{2}

=== Limits ===
The limits are:

- Street/Avenue (Bordering Partide)
- General Paz Avenue (Buenos Aires city).
- Díaz Vélez Avenue (La Matanza and Morón).
- República Avenue (La Matanza and Morón).
- Acayuasa street (Morón).
- Perdriel/República Avenue (Morón).
- General Justo José de Urquiza street (Morón).
- Ingeniero Guillermo Marconi street (Morón).
- Criss Cross the Colegio Militar
- Combate de Pavón street (Hurlingham).
- Reconquista River (San Miguel).
- General Lavalle street (General San Martín).
- Triunvirato street (General San Martín).
- Ferrocarril General Urquiza (General San Martín).

=== Settlements ===
The partido of Tres de Febrero is divided into 15 settlements, the capital being: Caseros

- Caseros
- Churruca
- Ciudad Jardín Lomas del Palomar

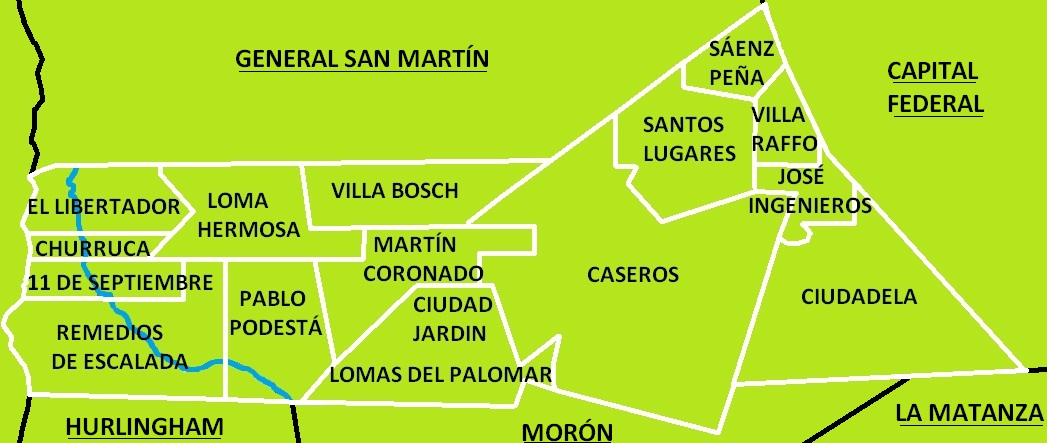
Map of the 15 settlements of Tres de Febrero Partido.

- Ciudadela
- El Libertador
- José Ingenieros
- Loma Hermosa
- Martín Coronado
- Once de Septiembre
- Pablo Podestá
- Remedios de Escalada
- Sáenz Peña
- Santos Lugares
- Villa Bosch
- Villa Raffo

=== Climate ===
The climate is temperate pampas. Though it does presents hot summers and cold winters, sufficient rainfall and in some cases generating strong floods, and prevailing winds from the east and northeast. The days 6, 7 and 8 July 2007, saw the entry of a polar cold air mass, and as a result on Monday 9 July, the simultaneous presence of very cold air in both middle levels of the atmosphere and at the surface, leading to the occurrence of precipitation in the form of sleet and snow. It was the third time that a snowfall occurred in the partido. It also snowed in 1912 and 1918.

Tres de Febrero

Climate chart (precipitation, max. and min. temperature)
J	F	M	A	M	J	J	A	S	O	N	D
110 30 17	134 28 16	141 24 15	104 21 11	77 19 8	73 16 5	66 14 4	69 15 6	72 19 9	113 22 10	106 25 14	97 28 17
- █ Average max. and min. temperatures in °C
- █ Precipitation totals in mm
- Source: SMN
Imperial conversion
J	F	M	A	M	J	J	A	S	O	N	D
4.3 86 63	5.3 82 61	5.6 75 59	4.1 70 52	3 66 46	2.9 61 41	2.6 57 39	2.7 59 43	2.8 66 48	4.4 72 50	4.2 77 57	3.8 82 63
- █ Average max. and min. temperatures in °F
- █ Precipitation totals in inches

== Population ==
The population of Tres de Febrero according to the census of October 2010 was 340.071 inhabitants. It is the 15th most populous partido in the Buenos Aires Province. The total fertility rate of partido is 1,65 children per woman.

According to estimates of INDEC, the population aged 65 or more would correspond to 14,15% of total and 60 years or more, 19,12% glimpsing an aging population structure. In turn, the population aged 0–14 years, representing 20,41% of the total.

Population distribution:

Population distribution of Tres de Febrero
Age	Population	%	Argentines	%	Foreigners	%
0-9	46.222	13,59%	45.424	98,27%	802	1,73%
10-19	47.729	14,03%	46.028	96,44%	1.701	3,56%
20-29	51.907	15,26%	48.117	92,73%	3.772	7,27%
30-39	50.006	14,70%	46.477	92,94%	3.529	7,06%
40-49	40.570	11,93%	37.379	92,13%	3.191	7,87%
50-59	38.630	11,36%	35.823	92,73%	2.807	7,27%
60-69	30.652	9,01%	25.912	84,54%	4.640	15,46%
70-79	21.641	6,36%	17.957	82,98%	3.687	17,02%
80+	12.714	3,74%	9.834	77,35%	2.880	22,65%
Total	340.071	100%	312.947	92,02%	27.124	7,98%

Tres de Febrero in the year 2001 had 336.467 inhabitants, amounting in the year 2010 to 340.071 inhabitants; i.e. its population grew by 1,07%. Its density increased from 7.314,5/km^{2} to 7.392,85/km^{2}.

The 7,98% of its population are foreigners, mainly from:

- Paraguay = 30,91%
- Italy = 23,99%
- Bolivia = 10,75%
- Peru = 8,43%
- Uruguay = 7,87%
- Spain = 6,57%
- Chile = 3,68%
- Brazil = 1,09%
- China = 0,58%

There are also migrants from other provinces of the country.

The index of masculinity is 90,8%.

Poverty affects 8,62% of the population of the partido, mainly young people between 18 and 24 years and young people from provinces.

Tres de Febrero has 112.588 homes, which indicates that living 3,02 persons for household. In total 81,56% of the partido has sewage, 97,04% has the pipes. 88,62% has natural gas while 10,79% use carafes. The 73,14% live in houses while 24,83% live in apartments and 62,53% have a computer.

=== Variation Intercensal ===
Evolution Population of Tres de Febrero Partido according to the different national censuses and intercensal variation in percentage
	1960	1970	1980	1991	2001	2010
Population	263.391	313.460	345.424	349.376	336.467	340.071
Variation	-	+19,00%	+10,19%	+1,14%	-3,69%	+1,07%

== Education ==
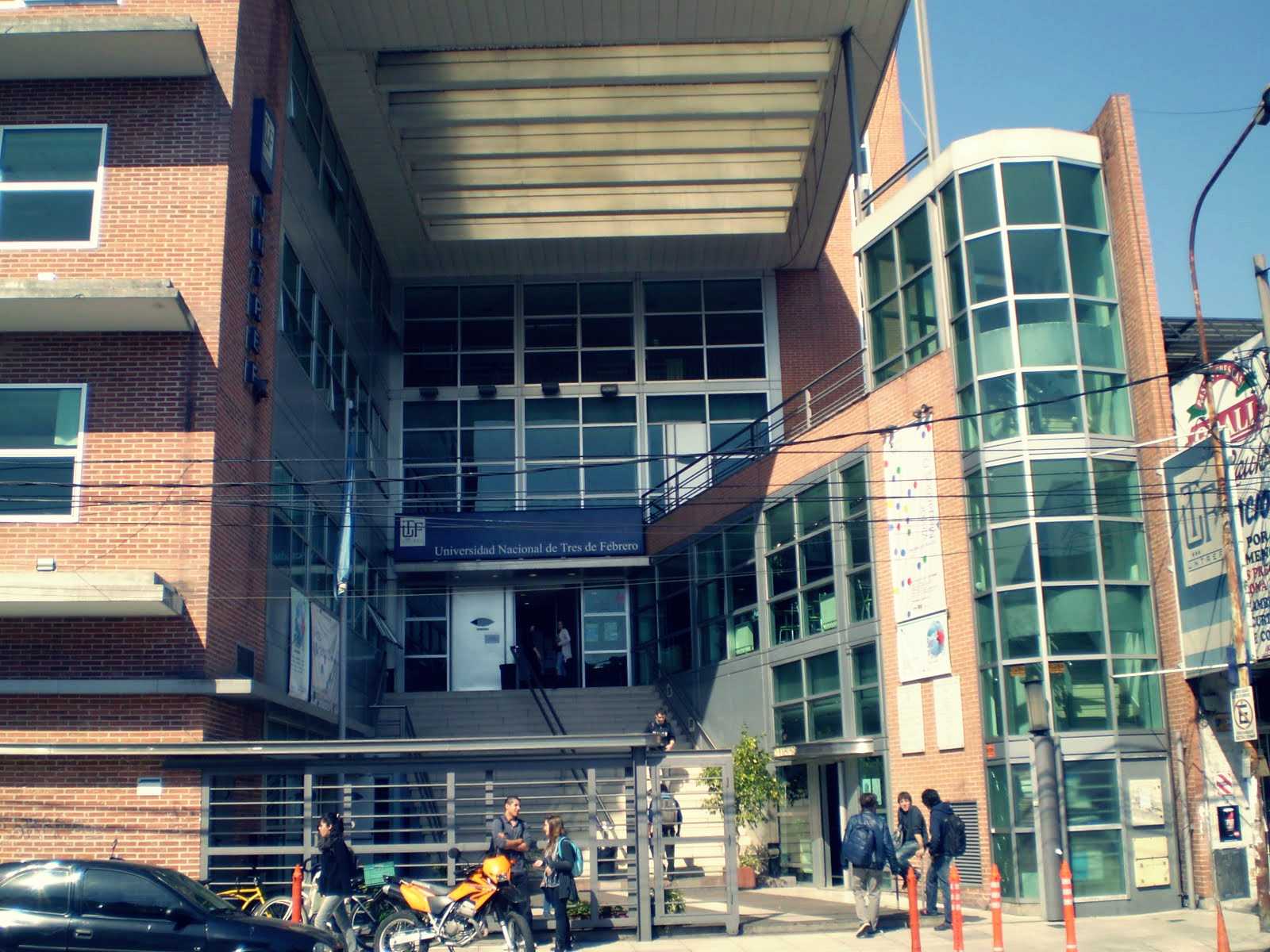
University of Tres de Febrero

Currently Tres de Febrero has most of 90 schools (public and private); a School Site Council (in the head town of the partido: Caseros) located on Andrés Ferreyra street, and the University of Tres de Febrero (UNTreF) was created in 1995, and attended by over 12.000 students, as it has different varieties of university courses and this located at a strategic point in the partido.

== Transport ==
By Tres de Febrero three lines of railroads run through the partido: Urquiza Line, San Martín Line and Sarmiento Line. And has 11 stations, 4 shared with San Martín and 1 shared with Morón:

• Urquiza Line:

- Coronel Lynch Station
- Fernández Moreno Station
- Lourdes Station
- Tropezón Station
- José María Bosch Station
- Martín Coronado Station
- Pablo Podestá Station

• San Martín Line:

- Sáenz Peña Station
- Santos Lugares Station
- Caseros Station
- El Palomar Station

• Sarmiento Line:

- Ciudadela Station

And some of the bus lines that run the partido are: 1, 53, 78, 85, 92, 96, 105, 123, 124, 135, 136, 146, 152, 163, 169, 181, 237, 242, 252, 310, 320, 326, 328 and 343.

== Sport ==
As for sports, Tres de Febrero has three sports centers municipalities where you can practice different types of disciplines, from swimming, athletics and football. The Centers are Ce.De.M. Number 1, Ce.De.M. Number 2 and the Ce.F. in which schools also use it to students to make physical education.

The partido also has three football club: Club Atlético Estudiantes, Club Almagro and Asociación Social y Deportiva Justo José de Urquiza better known as J. J. Urquiza.

The Club Atlético Estudiantes, is currently participating in the tournament Nacional B and the club not only practiced football, also there are a lot of disciplines. The club has a great friendship with Argentino de Rosario and Montevideo Wanderers Fútbol Club. Its historical rival is Almagro who dispute the classic Tres de Febrero, one of the most important Greater Buenos Aires. Stadium Estudiantes have a maximum capacity nearly 17.000 people. Almagro Club currently plays in the Primera B Metropolitana and their stadium has a capacity of 21.000 people. While J.J. Urquiza plays in Primera C tournament, has its stages capacity for 2.500 people.

Tres de Febrero also has different leagues and schools that work with dozens of participants, have added several cultural venues as the game is referred to as the provincial capital of sport with figures known as the boxer La Tigresa Acuña.

== Notable people ==
- Ernesto Sabato
- Moria Casán
- Ricardo Iorio
- Marcela "La Tigresa" Acuña
- Alejandro Dolina
- Carlos Tevez
- Tiago Almada
- Andrés Ciro Martínez
- Estela Raval
- Gabriel "El Puma" Goity
- Gustavo Santaolalla

== Twin towns ==
Tres de Febrero is twinned with:

- United Kingdom, Folkestone.
- Italy, Catanzaro.
- United States, El Dorado.
- Italy, Lecco.
- South Korea, Gwangju.
- Spain, Zaragoza.
