= Fuerte Apache =

Place in Buenos Aires, Argentina

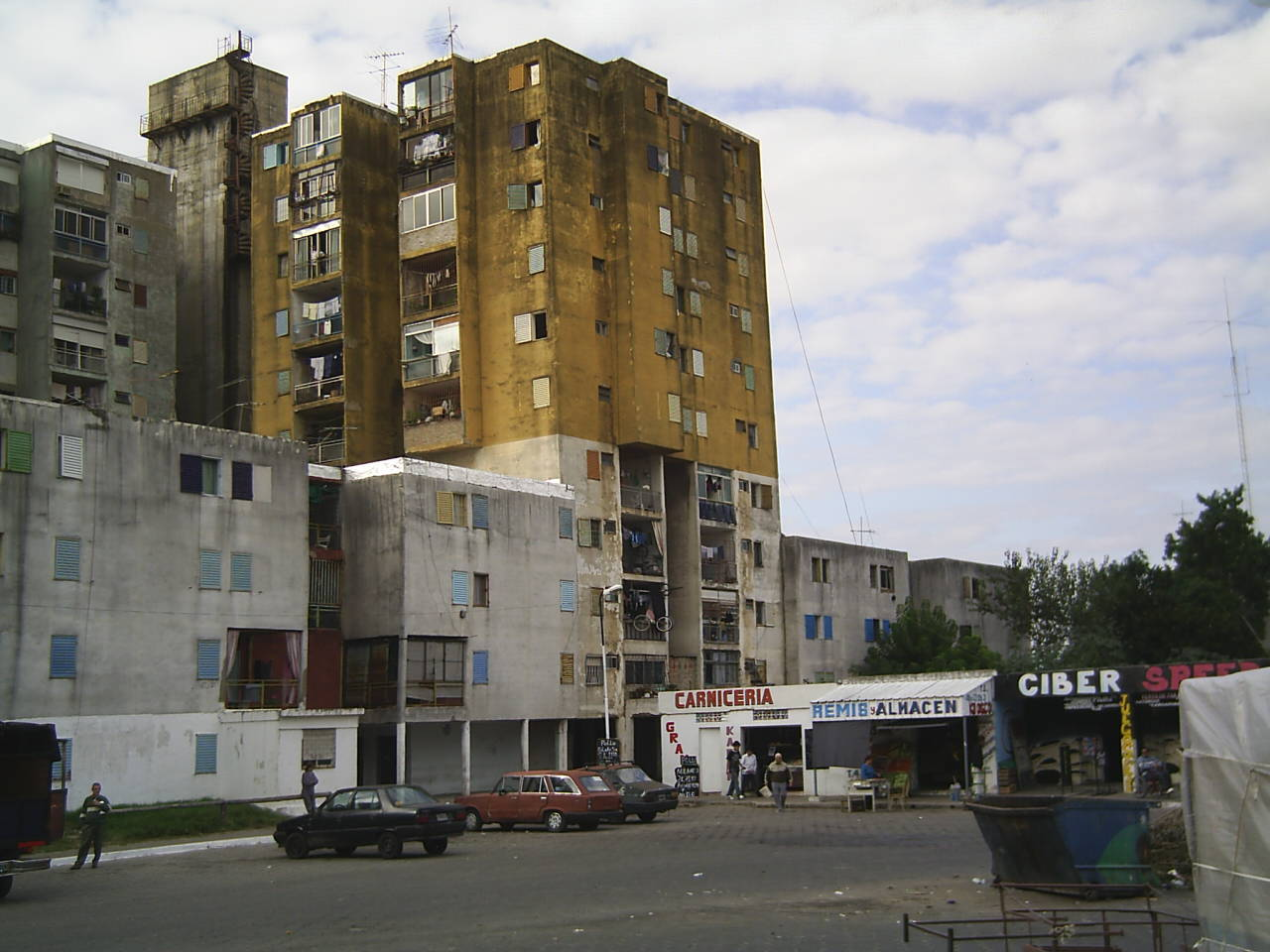
- Interactive map of Fuerte Apache
- Coordinates: 34°37′14″S 58°32′21″W
- Country: Argentina
- Province: Buenos Aires
- Partido: Tres de Febrero
- Elevation: 23 m (75 ft)
- CPA Base: B 1702
- Area code: +54 11

Barrio Ejército de los Andes, better known as Fuerte Apache, is a neighbourhood of Ciudadela near the city of Buenos Aires, Argentina. It is known for its high crime rates and prevalent drug use.

== Development ==
The neighborhood arose during the dictatorship of Juan Carlos Onganía in 1966, as part of a plan for the eradication of illegal settlements. This took place in stages, one of which coincided with the construction of the football stadiums for the 1978 World Cup. The military wanted it to be a well-guarded settlement, primarily for the poor. They deposited many people there who had been removed from the Villa 31 slum in Retiro. According to the 2001 census, Fuerte Apache houses 17,777 people in 4,657 residences, although up to four times that number may reside in the complex, as many families lease spare rooms for extra income.

During a brief period between dictatorships, the neighbourhood was christened "Liberation Father Mugica" in 1974, in honor of the anti-poverty activist, who had been murdered days before by paramilitary squads. The military renamed it "Ejército de los Andes" (Army of the Andes) in 1976, and the nickname Fuerte Apache was given by the journalist José de Zer alluding to the movie Fort Apache, The Bronx while reporting about a gunfight in the complex.

== Notable residents ==
- Thiago Almada – professional footballer
- Carlos Tevez – professional footballer
