= San Luis de Alba =

Colonial mining settlement near Puno, Peru

San Luis de Alba de Laicacota was a colonial mining settlement located near the city of Puno, Peru, on the shores of Lake Titicaca. Referred to usually as "San Luis de Alba" or just "Laicacota", the settlement was first recognized by the Spanish Crown as an official asiento mining settlement in AD 1665, when it was given ecclesiastical authority and its own priest. San Luis de Alba was built near silver mines on the banks of the mountains Cerro Negro Peque and Cerro Cancharani. The most famous of these colonial mines were Laicacota and Cancharani. The first silver strike occurred in 1657, when Jose de Salcedo registered silver vein at "Laicacota la Alta."

The settlement was abandoned in AD 1668 following a series of uprisings and executions that became known as the Laicacota Rebellion, or the Laicacota Conflict, and the majority of the population was moved to Puno.

== San Luis de Alba Settlement ==
After its official founding in AD 1665, San Luis de Alba quickly grew into a large mining community. Historian Meredith Dodge describes San Luis de Alba as having over 3,000 houses by AD 1667 (Dodge 1984). However, scholars have recently reinterpreted this number to mean the entire population of the Puno Bay, not just San Luis de Alba. Dodge describes San Luis de Alba as having three separate churches: the Iglesia de San Francisco, the Capilla del Señor Obispo (also known as the Capilla de los Santos Lugares), and the Capilla de las Animas. She also describes a central plaza lined with large houses belonging to important mine owners. Apparently, there were no official town halls or government buildings at San Luis de Alba, as it was not recognized as an official town, only a mining seat (asiento de mina).

== Confusion with Nearby Silver Refineries ==
The name of San Luis de Alba has sometimes been erroneously attributed to other colonial period silver processing sites in the region. For example, a large silver refinery and processing site, known as Chorrillos Itapalluni, has been incorrectly labeled as "San Luis de Alba" and the "Fuerte de San Luis de Alba". In reality, Chorrillos was located 2 km west of San Luis de Alba and was an industrial processing site, not a mining camp.
