= Ciudad Jardín Lomas del Palomar =

- District
- Interactive map of Ciudad Jardín Lomas del Palomar
- Location in Greater Buenos Aires
- Country: Argentina
- Province: Buenos Aires
- Partido: Tres de Febrero
- Founded: 1944
- Elevation: 28 m (92 ft)

Population (2001 census [INDEC])
  - Total: 17,605
- CPA Base: B 1684
- Area code: +54 11

Ciudad Jardín Lomas del Palomar is a planned community, part of the partido of Tres de Febrero in Greater Buenos Aires and adjacent to the city of El Palomar. It is served by two railway lines, the San Martín Line and the Urquiza Line, which provide access to the capital about 20 kilometres (12 mi) away.

== Urban character ==
Ciudad Jardín Lomas del Palomar is an unusual, colorful, socially mixed and lively neighbourhood of about 6,650 families in an area of 2.4 km^{2} (0.93 sq mi). Inspired by the Garden city movement, its layout is designed on a pedestrian scale with compact residential areas made up of tile roofed row style and free standing chalets in tree-lined streets and boulevards. There are three arcaded three-storey residential-commercial plazas (town squares) with central greenery, children's playgrounds, fountains and surrounded by shops, pubs and al fresco dining restaurants.

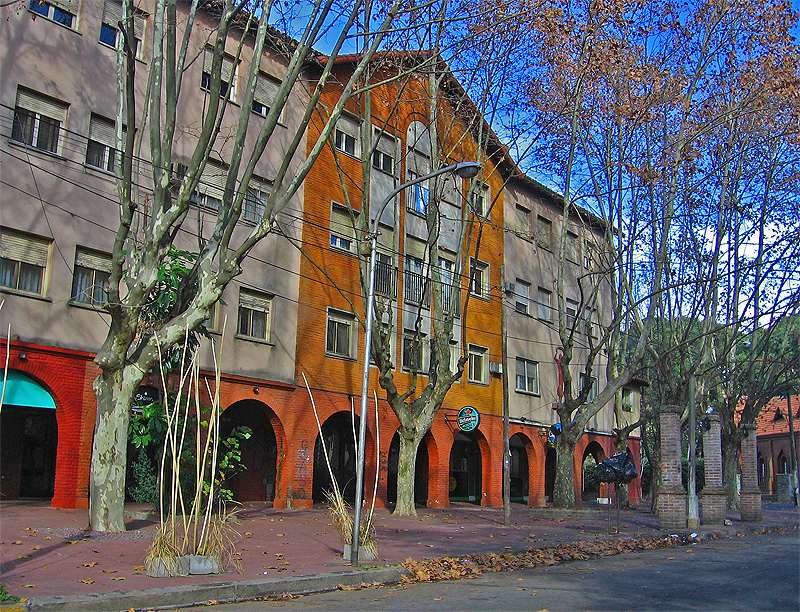
Plaza Plate (Plate Square) on a cold autumn morning

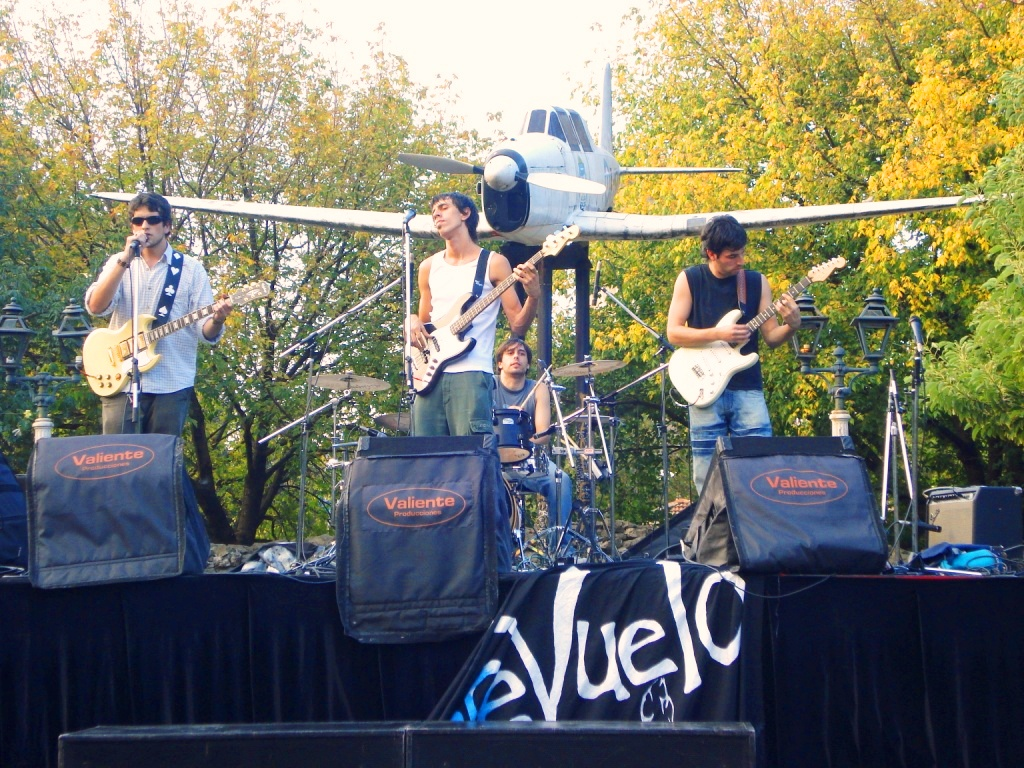
Outdoor rock music concert in Plaza de los Aviadores (Aviators Square)

The layout was developed to place cultural facilities, such as schools, churches, clubs and parks, mixed together and within walking distance of housing areas. There are a number of public plazas and plazoletas (mini plazas) that are generally surrounded by restaurants and other businesses. The gastronomy in Ciudad Jardin is first class, featuring authentic ethnic food including Japanese, Chinese, Italian, and German cuisine.

In a part of the city there is a large part of the Colegio Militar de la Nacion, including the National Historic Monument, El Palomar de Casero and the Casa de Diego Casero that were the epicenter of the Battle of Caseros and of the preliminary negotiations of the Pact of San José de Flores.

== History ==
Inaugurated in 1944, Ciudad Jardín was conceived by Erich Zeyen, a German emigrant who arrived in 1929 with the idea of creating a Garden City that offered a balance of urban life with green spaces, a city within a city. It has been recognized and mentioned in publications on urban planning on a worldwide level.

Carlos María della Paolera, founder of "Día Mundial del Urbanismo" (World Urbanism Day), has praised Ciudad Jardín as the first Garden City in South America.

Ciudad Jardín's citizens are debating whether a highway with direct links to an expressway should be built. There is a concern that the proposal would ruin the community's character and put it in jeopardy. It is argued that a better approach would be to improve the run-down commuter San Martín rail line that runs parallel to the proposed highway.

== Rock 'n Roll City ==
Ciudad Jardín has produced national and internationally known celebrities, and is a cradle of important musicians of jazz and rock music groups. Gustavo Santaolalla, Javier and Walter Malosetti (jazz), Ricardo Pellican, Los Piojos, MAM, Feroz, and Arco Iris, (Gustavo Santaolalla's band) have all lived or participated in the community. Andres "Ciro" Martinez, frontman of Los Piojos and one of the most popular musicians in the country, currently lives in Ciudad Jardin. The city is also home to a vibrant music scene today, with a number of locations at which local bands can perform for their neighbors. The Plaza de los Aviadores, the central plaza, has featured musical and cultural acts.

== Battle of Caseros ==
In 1852 the area was the site of the Battle of Caseros, between the Army of Buenos Aires commanded by Juan Manuel de Rosas and the Grand Army (Ejército Grande) led by Justo José de Urquiza.

== Notable residents ==
- Ángel Lo Valvo
- Sebastián Prieto
- Luis Scola
- Jorge Donn
- Hilda Molina
- Adolf Galland
- Gustavo Santaolalla
- León Gieco
- Francisco Benkö
- Heinrich Reinhardt
- Jorge Olguin
- Saskia Sassen
- Enio Iommi
- Kurt Pahlen
- Alejandro Lanari
- Gerardo Bönnhoff

== Notable visitors ==
- Juan Manuel Fangio
- Guillermo Vilas
- Andrea de Cesaris
- Virginia Ruano Pascual
- Bobby Fischer
- Esteban Tuero
- Mercedes Sosa
- Hermann Lang
- Karl Kling
- Werner Baumbach
- Hans-Ulrich Rudel
- José Pékerman
- Miguel Najdorf

== In media ==
- The songs "Esquina Libertad", and "Buenos Dias Palomar", by the local band Los Piojos, talk about the city.
- The song "Mañana campestre" of the local band Arco Iris, is inspired by the city.
- The film Extraña invasión was filmed entirely in the city in 1965.
- The film Terrified it was filmed entirely in the city in 2017.

== See also ==
- Béccar, San Isidro
- Garden city movement
- Gartenstadt (in the German Wikipedia)
- Urbanism
- World Urbanism Day
