= Chorrillos Itapalluni =

Archeological site in Peru

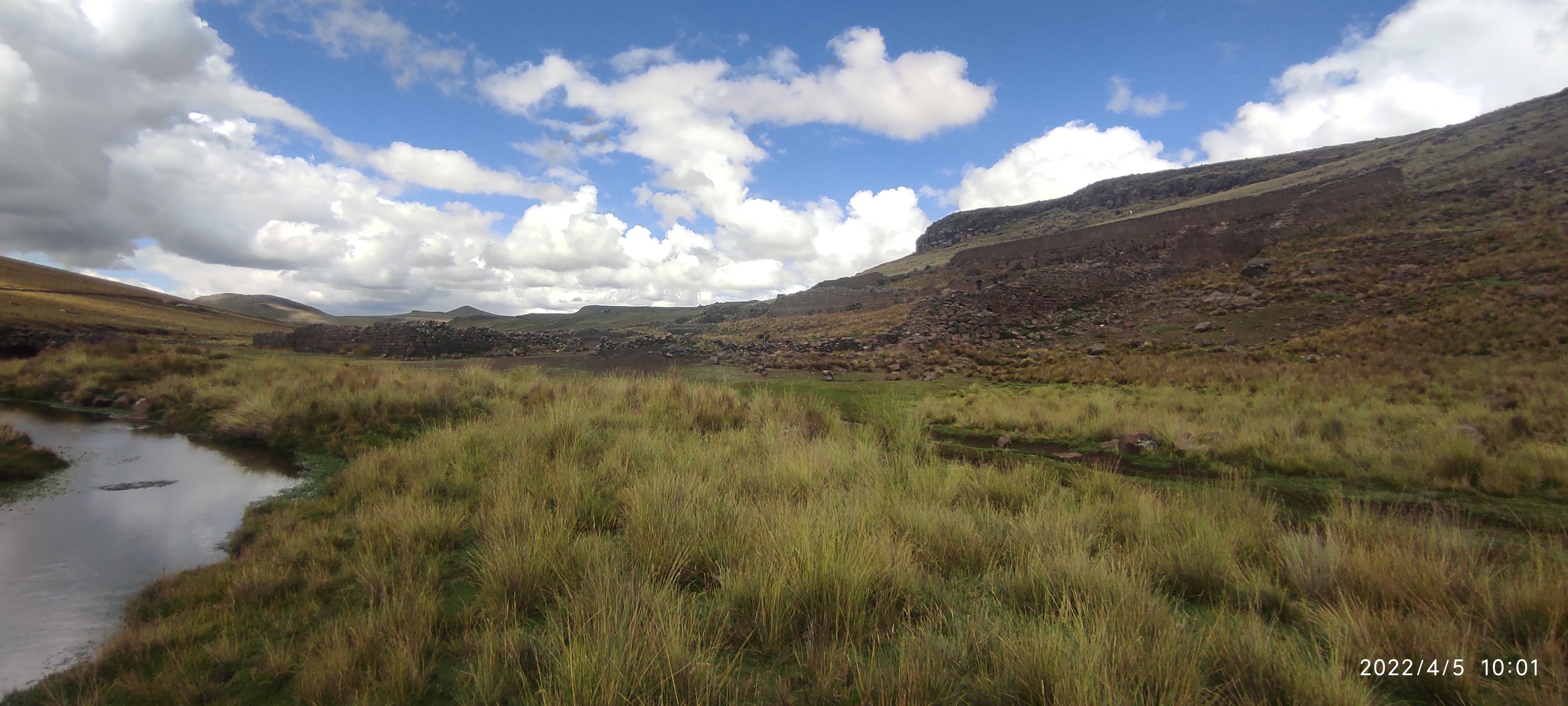
View of the Chorrillos Itapalluni silver refinery

Chorrillos Itapalluni is an archaeological site located near the town of Puno, Peru, near Lake Titicaca. The site was used as a large silver ore processing site in the colonial period for the nearby silver mines at Laycacota and Cancharani. It is located just a few kilometers from the abandoned colonial mining town, the Asiento de San Luis de Alba. While it is sometimes still erroneously referred to as San Luis de Alba, it was never a large settlement, instead primarily associated with silver ore processing, crushing, and refining.

Chorrillos is now protected by the Peruvian Ministry of Culture as an Asiento Minero cultural heritage site.

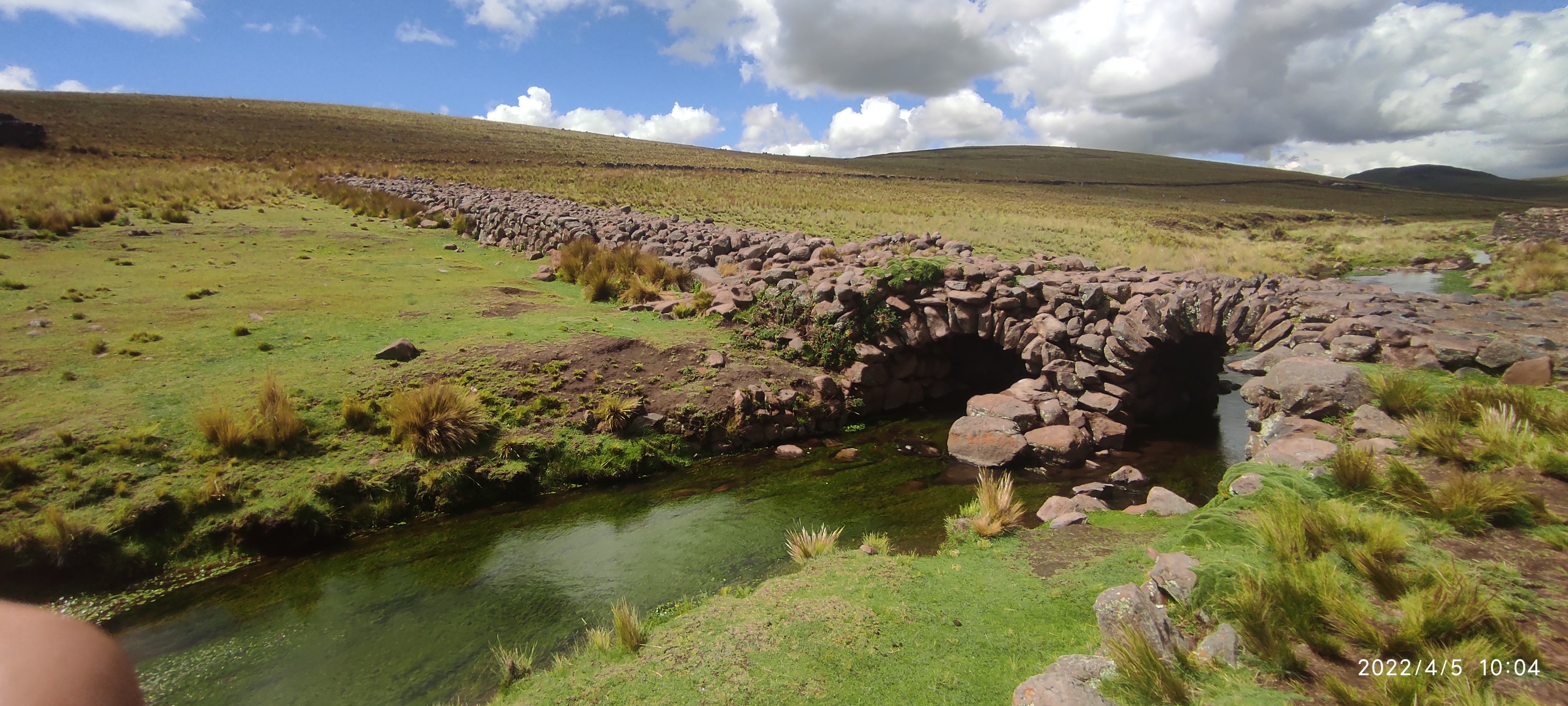
View of the bridge over the Itapalluni River, leading to the complex (to right)
