= Once de Septiembre =

- District
- Location in Greater Buenos Aires
- Coordinates: 34°36′S 58°31′W
- Country: Argentina
- Province: Buenos Aires
- Partido: Tres de Febrero
- Elevation: 24 m (79 ft)

Population (2001 census [INDEC])
  - Total: 4,355
- CPA Base: B 1657
- Area code: +54 11

Once de Septiembre is a town in Tres de Febrero Partido of Buenos Aires Province, Argentina. It is located in the Greater Buenos Aires urban agglomeration. The name is often spelt "Once de Setiembre" (both spellings are correct) or "11 de Setiembre/Septiembre".

The town is named for the September 11, 1852, rebellion of Buenos Aires against the Federal government of General Justo José de Urquiza.

== Population ==
With only 4,355 inhabitants, Once de Septiembre is the least populous district in Tres de Febrero Partido.
