= Lucas Chaves =

Argentine professional footballer

Personal information
- Full name: Lucas Abraham Chaves
- Date of birth: 9 August 1995 (age 31)
- Place of birth: Martín Coronado, Argentina
- Height: 1.78 m (5 ft 10 in)
- Position: Goalkeeper

Team information
- Current team: Panathinaikos (on loan from Argentinos Juniors)
- Number: 12

Youth career
- Argentinos Juniors

Senior career*
Years	Team	Apps	(Gls)
2016–	Argentinos Juniors	106	(0)
2022–2024	→ Huracán (loan)	67	(0)
2024–2026	→ Panetolikos (loan)	62	(0)
2026–	→ Panathinaikos (loan)	0	(0)
- * Club domestic league appearances and goals as of 21 December 2025

Lucas Chaves (born 9 August 1995) is an Argentine professional footballer who plays as a goalkeeper for Super League Greece club Panathinaikos, on loan from Argentinos Juniors.

== Career ==
Prior to starting his professional career with Argentinos Juniors, he spent time with the youth teams. He first appeared in the Argentinos first-team in 2016 when he was an unused substitute for the Argentine Primera División matches against Huracán, San Martín, Newell's Old Boys, Racing Club and Vélez Sarsfield. He made his professional debut on 5 June 2017 in Primera B Nacional versus Boca Unidos. Four months later, Chaves made his top-flight debut in a draw with River Plate.

On 9 January 2024, Chaves was signed by Super League Greece club Panetolikos, on a two–year loan.. After his loan with Panetolikos ended, on 8 January 2026, Chaves was loaned out once again, this time to Panathinaikos until the end of the season.

=== Club ===
As of 24 January 2026

Appearances and goals by club, season and competition
Club	Season	League			National Cup		Continental		Other		Total	
Club	Season	Division	Apps	Goals	Apps	Goals	Apps	Goals	Apps	Goals	Apps	Goals
Argentinos Juniors	2016	Argentine Primera División	0	0	—		—		—		0	0
Argentinos Juniors	2016–17	Primera Nacional	3	0	—		—		—		3	0
Argentinos Juniors	2017–18	Argentine Primera División	25	0	0	0	—		1 (Note: Appearance(s) in Torneos de Verano)	0	26	0
Argentinos Juniors	2018–19	Argentine Primera División	20	0	2	0	—		8 (Note: Appearance(s) in Copa de la Superliga)	0	30	0
Argentinos Juniors	2019–20	Argentine Primera División	23	0	3	0	6 (Note: Appearance(s) in Copa Sudamericana)	0	1	0	33	0
Argentinos Juniors	2020–21	Argentine Primera División	11	0	1	0	2	0	—		14	0
Argentinos Juniors	2021	Argentine Primera División	23	0	1	0	8 (Note: Appearance(s) in Copa Libertadores)	0	—		32	0
Argentinos Juniors	2022	Argentine Primera División	0	0	—		—		—		0	0
Argentinos Juniors	2024	Argentine Primera División	—		—		0	0	—		0	0
Argentinos Juniors	Total		105	0	7	0	16	0	10	0	138	0
Huracán (loan)	2022	Argentine Primera División	27	0	—		—		—		27	0
Huracán (loan)	2023	Argentine Primera División	40	0	4	0	10 (Note: Four appearances in Copa Libertadores, Six appearances in Copa Sudamericana)	0	—		54	0
Huracán (loan)	Total		67	0	4	0	10	0	—		81	0
Panetolikos (loan)	2023–24	Super League Greece	4	0	2	0	—		7 (Note: appearance(s) in Super League Greece Play–out)	0	13	0
Panetolikos (loan)	2024–25	Super League Greece	15	0	0	0	—		10	0	36	0
Panetolikos (loan)	2025–26	Super League Greece	26	0	1	0	—		—		27	0
Panetolikos (loan)	Total		45	0	3	0	0	0	17	0	76	0
Panathinaikos (loan)	2025–26	Super League Greece	0	0	0	0	0	0	0	0	0	0
Career Total			217	0	14	0	26	0	27	0	284	0

== Honours ==
Argentinos Juniors

- Primera B Nacional: 2016–17
