= Sáenz Peña, Buenos Aires =

Sáenz Peña
- District
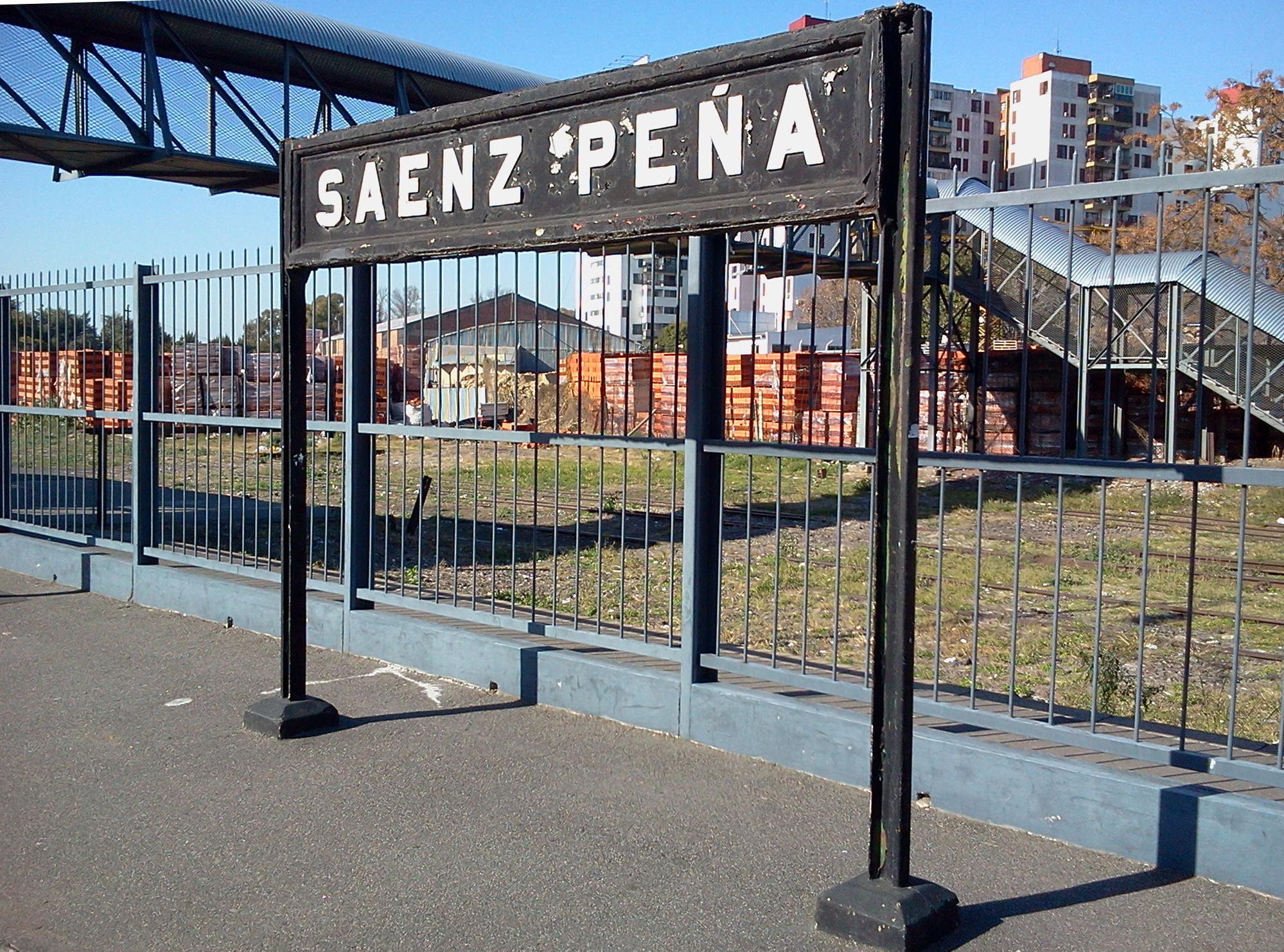
- Sáenz Peña train station.

- Location in Greater Buenos Aires
- Coordinates: 34°36′S 58°31′W
- Country: Argentina
- Province: Buenos Aires
- Partido: Tres de Febrero

Population (2001 census [INDEC])
  - Total: 11,542
  - Density: 9,618.3/km^{2} (24,911/sq mi)
- CPA Base: B 1674
- Area code: +54 11

Presidencia Roque Sáenz Peña (commonly shortened to Sáenz Peña) is a town in Tres de Febrero Partido of Buenos Aires Province, Argentina. It is located in the Greater Buenos Aires urban agglomeration on the border with Buenos Aires. The city recorded an urban population of 89,882 in the 2010 census, though rapid development has driven its current population well beyond 100,000, with daily commuters supplementing that figure.

The city's origins date back to 1907, with a residential land subdivision that expanded following the 1910 inauguration of a station on the Buenos Aires to the Pacific Railway. It was officially founded on March 1, 1912, when its first permanent settlers, six Spanish immigrants, received their property titles, and it was formally named in honor of President Roque Sáenz Peña later that year. Reflecting its status as the geographical heart of Chaco's cotton country, the city's official municipal flag—adopted on its 101st anniversary—features a tri-color design symbolizing the regional cotton economy, the local native forests, and its famous urban thermal waters, celebrating an identity forged by a cultural melting pot of Creole, immigrant, and indigenous communities.

== History ==
The town's initial growth began in 1907 when landowner Carlos Mayober subdivided his property into residential lots, attracting the area's first permanent settlers. This development was solidified by the 1909 announcement of a new station at Kilometer 11 along the Buenos Aires to the Pacific Railway. Formally opened on December 1, 1910, the station was named Sáenz Peña by an executive decree signed by President José Figueroa Alcorta in 1907. The railway line was later renamed the General San Martín Railway in 1946, and the town itself was officially recorded in municipal council records in 1911.

The city's official founding is marked on March 1, 1912, when its first permanent residents, six Spaniards from Resistencia, received their property titles. Seeking official recognition for the growing settlement, Fernández traveled to Buenos Aires to request presidential patronage, and on 24 October 1912, the settlement was officially named Presidencia Roque Sáenz Peña.

== Population ==
According to the National Institute of Statistics and Census of Argentina in 2010, the city had an urban population of 89,882 residents. Owing to significant growth in recent decades and its strategic geographic location, the current population is estimated to surpass 100,000, with thousands of daily commuters. Demographically, it ranks as the second-largest city in Chaco Province and is the most populous city in the Northeast Argentina (NEA) region that is not a provincial capital.

== Flag ==
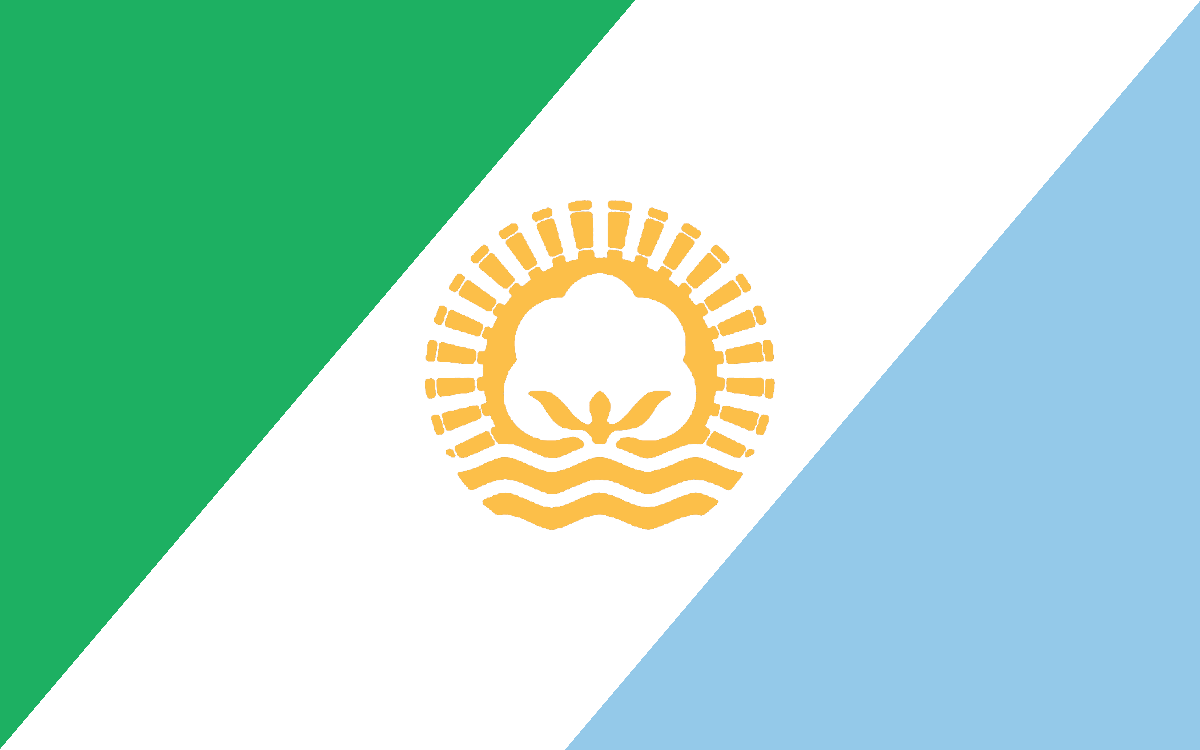
Flag of Saenz Paena

The flag was unveiled on the 101st anniversary of the city's founding, when it was adopted via municipal ordinance No. 7519 following a community-wide design contest. The flag uses a tri-color scheme, with the white stripe commemorating cotton as the historic backbone of the regional economy, the green stripe honoring the surrounding agricultural fields and the native forests of the Municipal Ecological Complex, and the light blue stripe celebrating the urban thermal waters as a source of health and wellness. At the center of the white field lies a composite emblem highlighting three historical anchors, with intersecting roads symbolizing the city's origins as a cultural melting pot of Creole, immigrant, and indigenous peoples. This emblem also contains a central cotton boll representing progress at the geographical heart of Chaco's cotton country, alongside undulating lines that mirror the serene thermal springs that drive local tourism and community identity.

== Famous residents ==
- Marco Denevi, writer and dramatist.
- Jonás Gutiérrez, footballer.
- Javier Milei, politician.
- Guido Rodríguez, footballer.
- Leonardo Sbaraglia, actor.
