= Villa Raffo =

- District
- Location in Greater Buenos Aires
- Coordinates: 34°36′25″S 58°31′55″W
- Country: Argentina
- Province: Buenos Aires
- Partido: Tres de Febrero
- Elevation: 21 m (69 ft)

Population (2001 census [INDEC])
  - Total: 7,864
  - Density: 8,737.7/km^{2} (22,631/sq mi)
- CPA Base: B 1674
- Area code: +54 11

Villa Raffo is a town in Tres de Febrero Partido of Buenos Aires Province, Argentina. It is located in the Greater Buenos Aires urban agglomeration.

== History ==
The area, the eastern part of which now lies in the City of Buenos Aires proper, was owned by Bernardino Manzanares in the 19th century. His heirs sold the land to Ezequiel and Pedro Raffo, from whom the settlement took its name. The land was divided up into lots, and the Buenos Aires and Pacific Railway bought a section to construct a neighbourhood for its workers.
