= El Palomar Airport =

Airport in El Palomar, Argentina

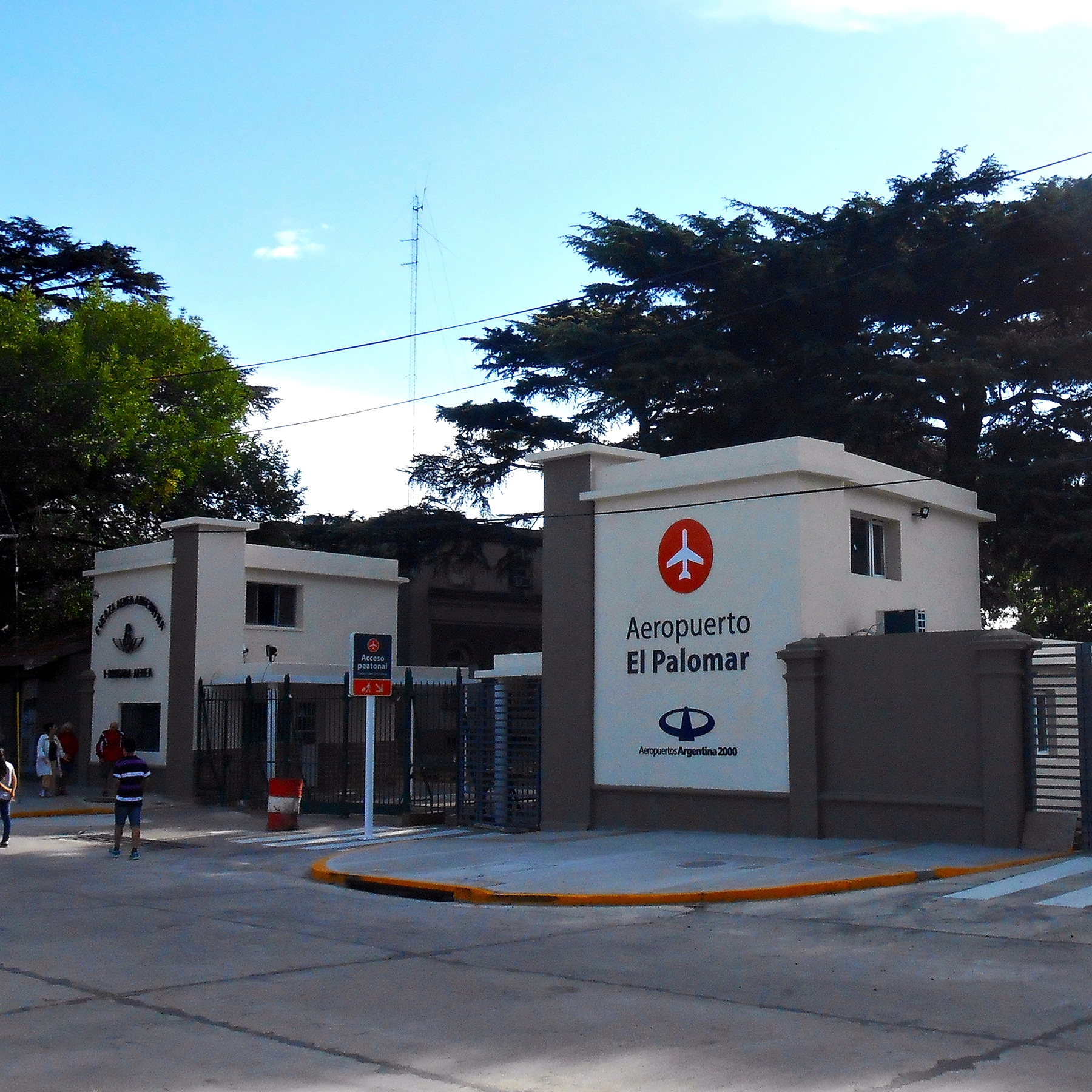
- IATA: EPA; ICAO: SADP

Summary
- Airport type: Military
- Serves: Buenos Aires
- Location: El Palomar, Argentina
- Elevation AMSL: 18 m (59 ft)
- Coordinates: 34°36′36″S 058°36′45″W

Map
- Location in greater Buenos Aires Location of the airport in Argentina

Runways
Direction	Length		Surface
Direction	m	ft	Surface
17/35	2,110	6,923	Asphalt
- Source: WAD,

El Palomar Airport (IATA: EPA, ICAO: SADP) is a commercial and military airport in El Palomar, Argentina. It is the home base for the 1st Air Brigade (Spanish: Primera Brigada Aérea) of the Argentine Air Force, which is mainly a transportation unit. It is located 18 km (11 mi) west of Buenos Aires, near the El Palomar station of the San Martín railway line. It was created in 1912 to accommodate the Army Aviation School, which was the base for the future Argentine Air Force.

Commercial flights in and out of El Palomar were stopped in 2020 amid the COVID-19 pandemic. As of 2022, commercial flight facilities at El Palomar were reportedly being dismantled and moved to Ezeiza International Airport, limiting hopes that commercial flights would return to El Palomar.

== Facilities ==
The airport resides at an elevation of 59 feet (18 m) above mean sea level and it has one runway designated 16/34 which measures 6,923 by 164 feet (2,110 m × 50 m).

It is located 2 km from Acceso Oeste Highway and 200 metres (660 ft) from San Martín Line's El Palomar station.

In February 2017, it was announced that Flybondi, a new low-cost carrier, would use the airport in 2018 as a base to fly to multiple destinations within Argentina. Another low cost airline, JetSmart, has since arrived at the airport, and began flying international routes.

== In popular culture ==
The airport stood in for Santiago International Airport in the 2015 film, Colonia.
