= JJ Urquiza =

Argentine football club

Justo José de Urquiza
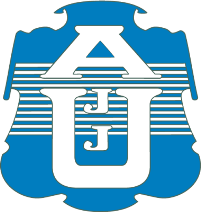
- Full name: Asociación Social y Deportiva San Gennaro Justo José de Urquiza
- Nicknames: The Diu; Los Capocchio
- Founded: 8 June 1936; 89 years ago
- Ground: Estdio Ramón Martín, El Libertador, Argentina
- Capacity: 2,500
- Chairman: Adrian Zaffaroni
- Manager: Daniel Sagman
- League: Primera C
- 2024: 5th
- Website: jjurquiza.com.ar
Home colours	Away colours

Asociación Social y Deportiva Justo José de Urquiza, known simply as Justo José de Urquiza, is an Argentine sports club headquartered in Caseros district of Tres de Febrero Partido, Greater Buenos Aires. The club is mostly known for its association football team, which currently plays in Primera B Metropolitana, the regionalised third division of the Argentine football league system.

Club's home venue, Ramón Roque Martín Stadium, is located in El Libertador district in the same partido. It was inaugurated in September 1994.

Apart from football, the club has other sports sections such as artistic roller skating, futsal, and chess.

The club is named in honour of Justo José de Urquiza, Argentine general and president of the Argentine Confederation between 1854 and 1860.

== History ==
=== Foundation ===
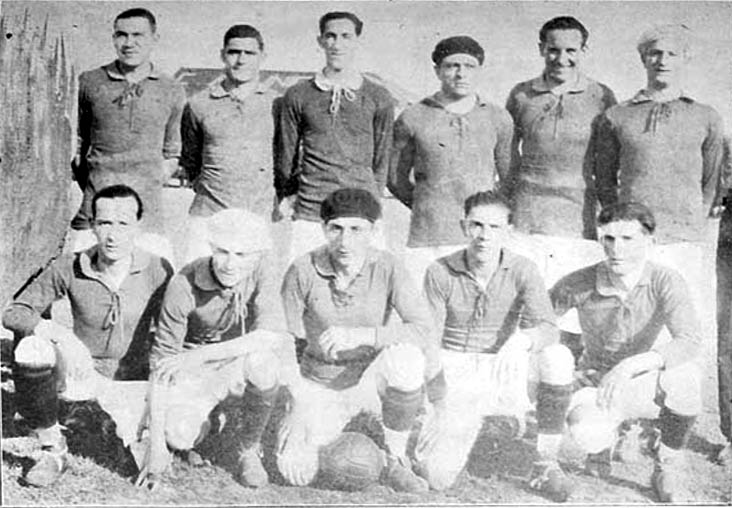
Team of Unión de Caseros in 1927. It was one of the clubs that merged to form J.J. Urquiza

The club was established on June 8, 1936, born from a merger of three clubs: Club Social, Club Atlético Unión, and Club Atlético Caseros. To formalize the agreement establishing the new institution, the interested clubs nominated a group of three delegates, representing the Social Club: Mr. Luis M. Sáenz, Mr. Alberto Seisdedos, and Mr. Emilio Buceta; Mr. José L. Vázquez, Mr. Enrique Aringoni, and Mr. Ernesto R. Rousset were appointed to Club Atlético Unión; and Mr. Dante Giorgi, Mr. Oscar Varaona, and Mr. Sergio Moglia were appointed to Club Atlético Caseros. Juan Carlos Pena was elected as first president of the club after being chosen by lottery.

After considering several notable Argentine personalities were considered to name the club, it was finally named "Justo José de Urquiza" to paid tribute to the general and politician who served as president of the Argentine Confederation from 1854 to 1860. The name of the neighborhood where the club is located, "Caseros", refers to the memorable battle in which Urquiza defeated Juan Manuel de Rosas on 3 February 1852.

=== Affiliation and football ===
The club affiliated to the Argentine Football Association in 1937 and began participating in Tercera División, the lowest division of Argentine football by then. In 1952 the team promoted for the first time in their history, as runner-up.

In 1986, with the restructuring of Argentine football and the creation of the Primera B Nacional as the second division, Primera D would become the fifth division. For this reason, a tournament was held in order to decide which teams would remain in Primera C (4th. division) and which would be relegated to Primera D. From a total of 28 teams, only six would be promoted. Urquiza failed to qualify and was relegated to the lowest division.

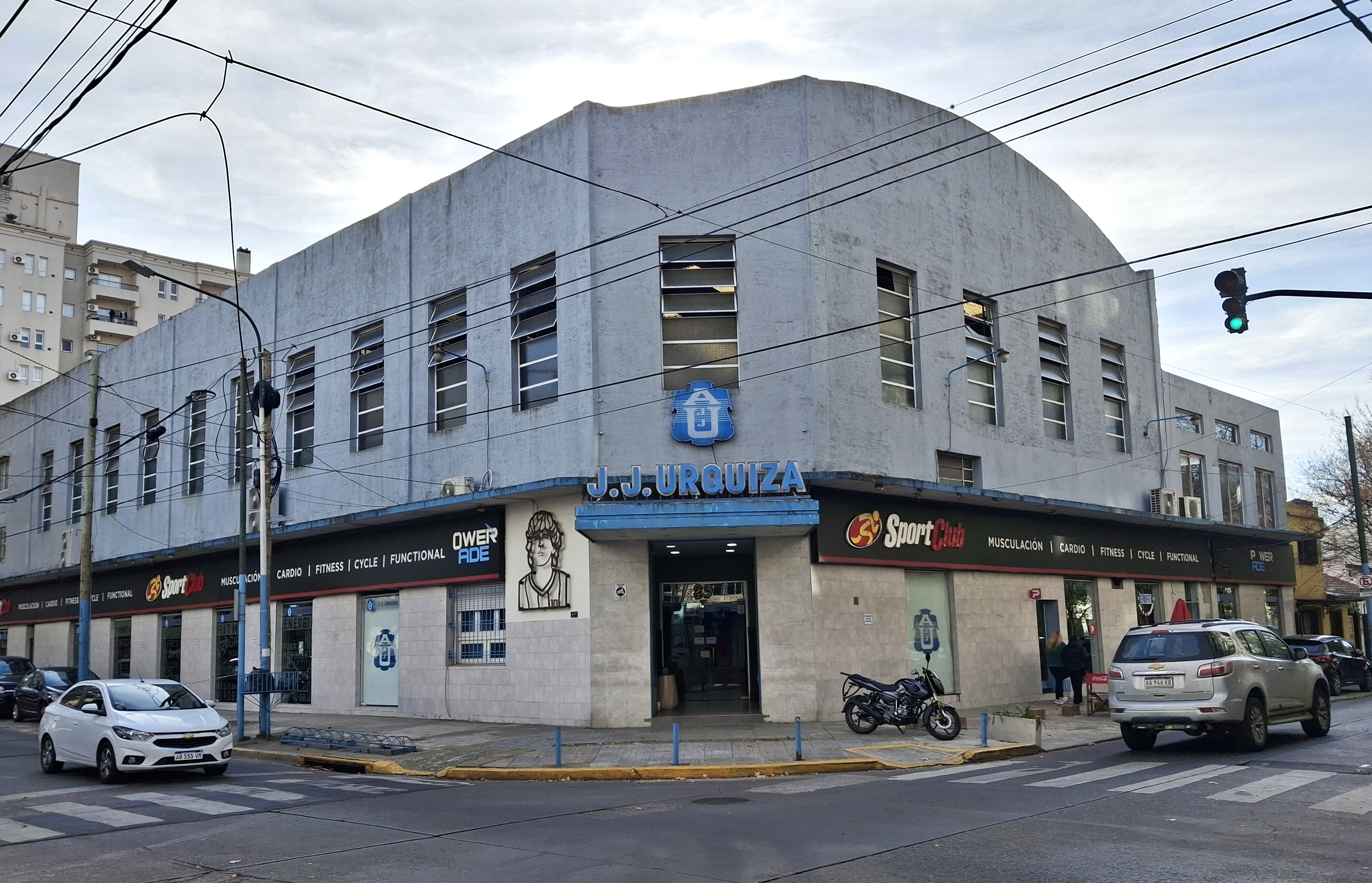
Club headquarters in Caseros, pictured in 2025

In the 1987–88 season and managed by Guillermo Abbas, the team won the Octagonal, earning promotion to Primera C, after beating Villa San Carlos in two legs (2–1 and 3-1). Nevertheless, Urquiza would be relegated the following year after a poor campaign.

On June 17, 1994, after 57 years of playing in AFA tournaments, Justo José de Urquiza, led by Ricardo Della Vecchia, won the Apertura Tournament, then playing Victoriano Arenas (Clausura champions) in the final to decide which team would be champion of the entire season (1994–95). Urquiza won the series 2–1 on aggregate, with two goals by Walter Eduardo Gómez to claim their first (and only to date) title, also promoting to Primera C.

In 2018 Urquiza promoted to Primera B Metropolitana for the first time. The team qualified to play the Torneo Reducido in 2017–18 Primera C championship. Urquiza defeated Argentino de Quilmes on penalties after a 2–2 on aggreate in the finals.

== Venues ==
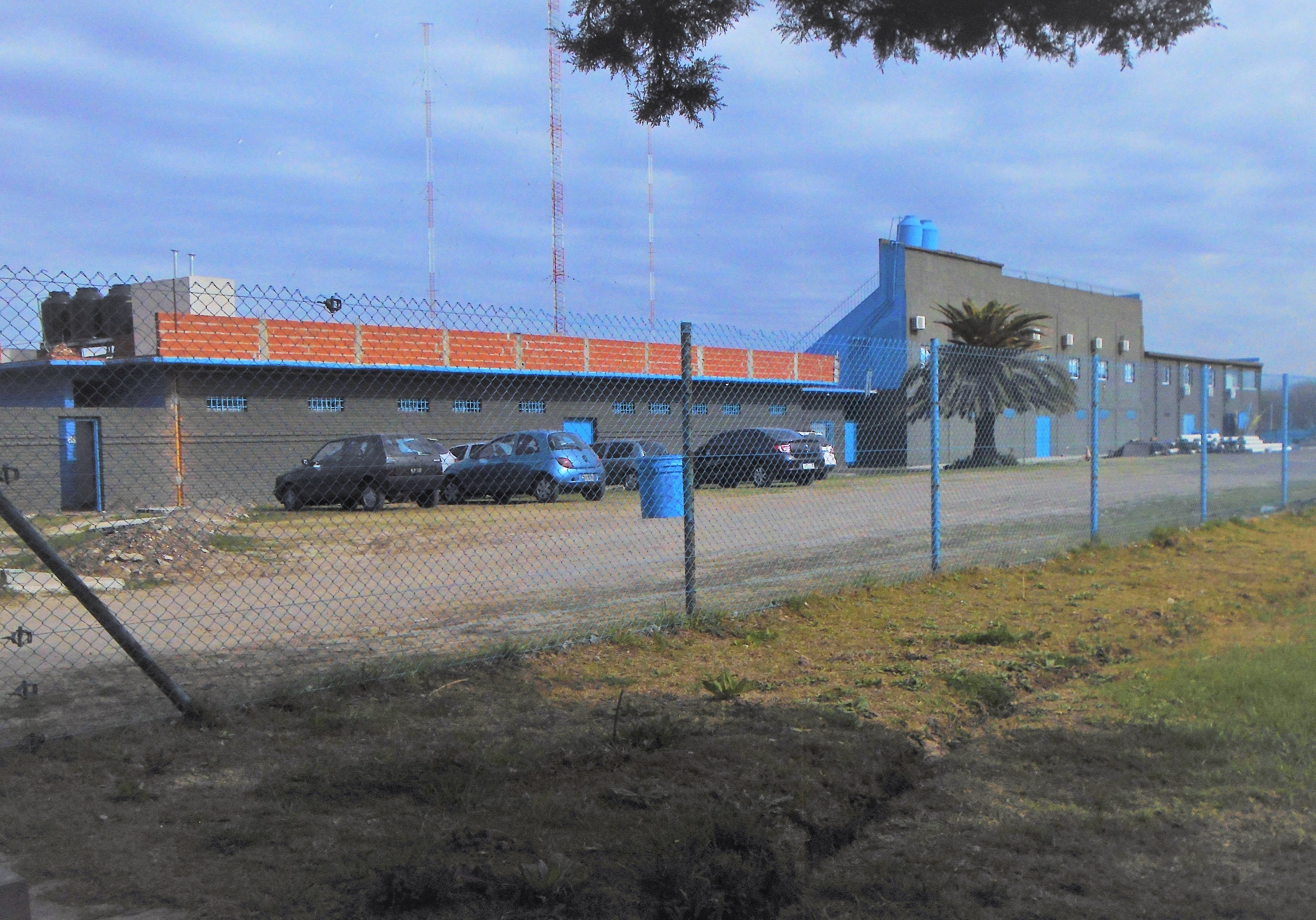
Estadio Ramón Martín, inaugurated in 1994

J.J. de Urquiza's first venue was the former C.A. Unión's home field, built in 1923 and located in Caseros, owned by the local municipality. The club was evicted from the land during the National reorganization process in 1980. Seven years later, the municipality gave the club a 6-hectare land in barrio Libertador, where the club built its current sports venue, on Miramar and Primera Junta streets.

The new stadium, named "Ramón Martín", was opened in 1994.

== Titles ==
- Primera D (1): 1994–95
