= Remedios de Escalada, Tres de Febrero =

Remedios de Escalada
- District
- Location in Greater Buenos Aires
- Coordinates: 34°35′S 58°32′W
- Country: Argentina
- Province: Buenos Aires
- Partido: Tres de Febrero
- Elevation: 24 m (79 ft)

Population (2001 census [INDEC])
  - Total: 11,860
- CPA Base: B 1657
- Area code: +54 11

Remedios de Escalada is a town in Buenos Aires Province, Argentina. It is the head town of the Tres de Febrero Partido.
