= Agustín Churruca =

Spanish field hockey player (born 1952)

Personal information
- Full name: Agustín Churruca Otero
- Nationality: Spanish
- Born: 9 September 1952 (age 73) Bilbao, Spain
- Height: 177 cm (5 ft 10 in)
- Weight: 75 kg (165 lb)

Sport
- Sport: Field hockey

Agustín Churruca Otero (Note: In this Spanish name, the first or paternal surname is Churruca and the second or maternal family name is Otero.) (born 9 September 1952) is a Spanish field hockey player. He competed at the 1972 Summer Olympics and the 1976 Summer Olympics.
