= Francisco Churruca =

Basque jai alai player

Francisco Maria Churruca Iriondo Azpiazu Alcorta (born 1 April 1936), also known as Patxi, was a Spanish jai alai player. A native of Mutriku, Gipuzkoa, Basque Country, he is regarded as the game's greatest player and has been called "the Babe Ruth of jai alai." He retired in 1983, saying "I knew it was time to quit when my eyes were quicker than my legs."

He was referenced in the television series ‘’Mad Men’’ (set in the world of 1960s American advertising), in a storyline involving a client's elaborate plan to promote jai alai as the "new national pastime" with Patxi as its figurehead.
