= National University of Tres de Febrero =

Coordinates: 34°36′06″S 58°31′40″W

- Universidad Nacional de Tres de Febrero
- Type: Public
- Established: 1995
- Students: 8714 (2008)
- Location: Caseros, Buenos Aires Province, Argentina
- Website: http://www.untref.edu.ar/

The National University of Tres de Febrero (Spanish: Universidad Nacional de Tres de Febrero, UNTreF) is an Argentine national university.

== Graduate study programs ==
- Bachelor's degree in business administration
- Bachelor's degree in social politics administration and management
- Bachelor's degree in public administration
- Bachelor's degree in foreign trade relationships
- Bachelor's degree in art and cultural management
- Bachelor's degree in statistics
- Bachelor's degree in work safety and hygiene
- Bachelor's degree in nursing
- Bachelor's degree in psychomotricity
- Bachelor's degree in history
- Bachelor's degree in geography
- Bachelor's degree in electronic arts
- Bachelor's degree in native, classical and popular music of the Americas
- Bachelor's degree in music
- Bachelor's degree in sport management
- Bachelor's degree in geographic information systems
- Computer engineering
- Audio engineering
- Environmental engineering

== See also ==
- Argentine Universities
