= El Palomar, Argentina =

Town in Buenos Aires Province, Argentina

El Palomar
- Town
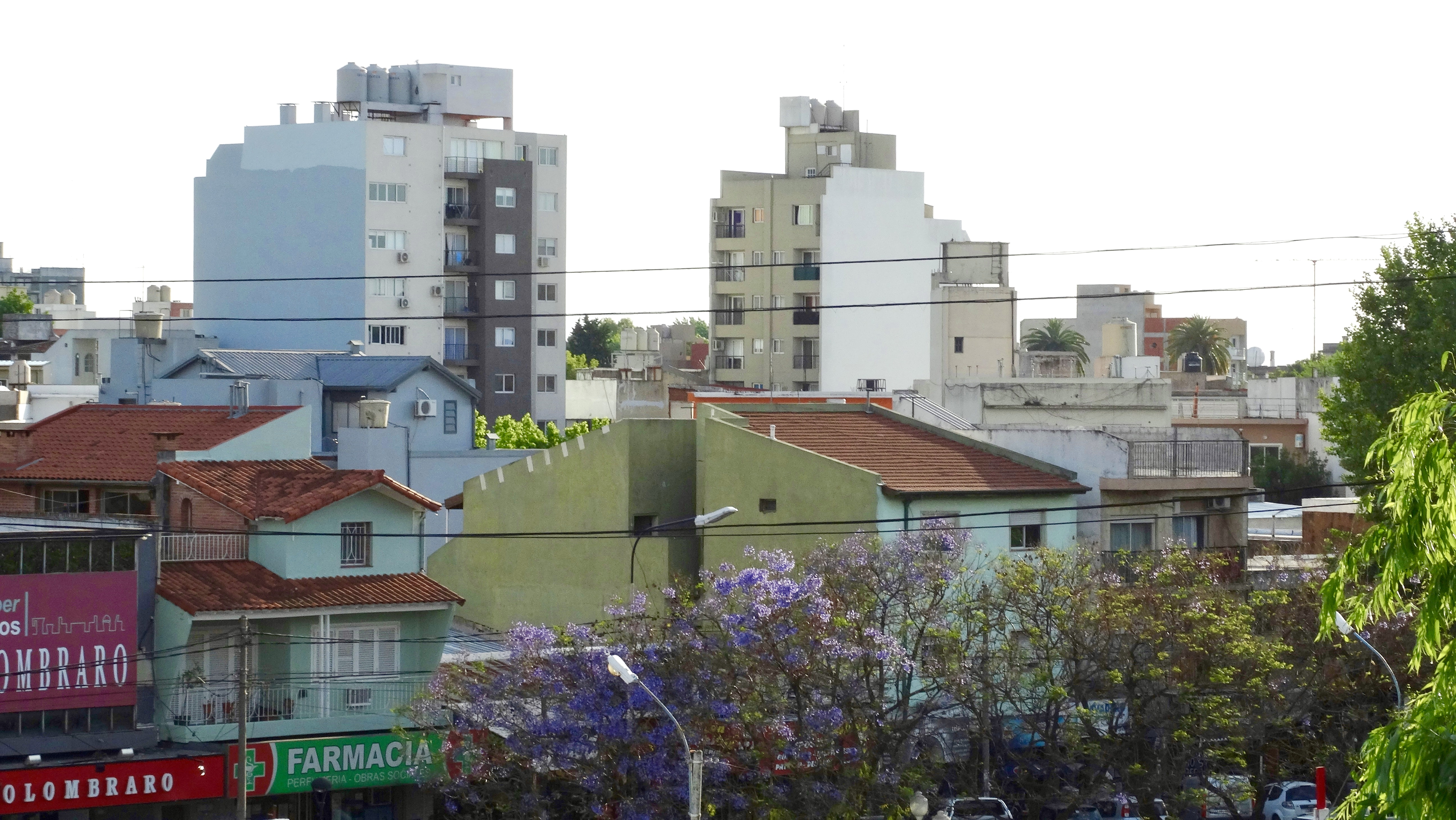

- Location in Greater Buenos Aires
- Coordinates: 34°37′34″S 58°35′39.5″W
- Country: Argentina
- Province: Buenos Aires
- Partido: Morón & Tres de Febrero
- Elevation: 6 m (20 ft)

Population (2001 census [INDEC])
  - Total: 74,757
  - Density: 8,063.7/km^{2} (20,885/sq mi)
- CPA Base: B 1684
- Area code: +54 11

El Palomar is a town in the urban agglomeration of Greater Buenos Aires in Argentina. It is located 20 km (12 mi) west of Buenos Aires.

The city has the peculiarity of being divided between two partidos of Buenos Aires Province: Morón, where it is called El Palomar, and Tres de Febrero, where it is called Ciudad Jardín Lomas del Palomar. Of its 74,751 inhabitants (2001 census [INDEC]), 57,146 live within the Morón jurisdiction and 17,605 live in Tres de Febrero.

El Palomar was established with a station by that name belonging to the Buenos Aires and Pacific Railway (Spanish: Ferrocarril Buenos Aires al Pacífico) opened in 1910. Developer Publio Massini sold the first lots on November 8 of that year, and Juan Manuel Giuffra established the El Palomar Development Council, which obtained electric lighting for the area in its early years. The city is home to the National Military College (Spanish: Colegio Militar de la Nación), the 1st Air Brigade (Spanish: Primera Brigada Aérea) of the Argentine Air Force, and El Palomar Airport.

The Italian Society of Tiro al Segno (Target Shooting) (S.I.T.A.S.), is located in Palomar. Horse riding, tennis, soccer, yoga, shooting, hockey, bodybuilding, and other sports can be practiced here. In an annex is the training venue for rugby and hockey.

French automaker PSA Group had a manufacturing plant in the area as well, which is now owned by PSA's successor Stellantis.

El Palomar is served by Ferrocarril General San Martín commuter rail service at El Palomar station with easy access to Retiro Station in downtown Buenos Aires, as well as by National Route 7.

== Ciudad Jardín Lomas del Palomar ==
Inaugurated in 1944, Ciudad Jardín was conceived with the idea of creating a garden city that offered a balance of urban life with green spaces, a city within a city.

== Climate ==
Climate data for El Palomar, Buenos Aires, Argentina (1981–2010, extremes 1961–present)
Month	Jan	Feb	Mar	Apr	May	Jun	Jul	Aug	Sep	Oct	Nov	Dec	Year
Record high °C (°F)	41.5 (106.7)	38.9 (102.0)	39.5 (103.1)	33.5 (92.3)	31.5 (88.7)	27.9 (82.2)	29.4 (84.9)	33.5 (92.3)	32.1 (89.8)	35.3 (95.5)	37.0 (98.6)	39.7 (103.5)	41.5 (106.7)
Mean daily maximum °C (°F)	29.9 (85.8)	28.5 (83.3)	26.5 (79.7)	22.5 (72.5)	18.9 (66.0)	15.7 (60.3)	15.1 (59.2)	17.4 (63.3)	19.2 (66.6)	22.3 (72.1)	25.2 (77.4)	28.3 (82.9)	22.5 (72.5)
Daily mean °C (°F)	24.1 (75.4)	22.9 (73.2)	20.9 (69.6)	16.7 (62.1)	13.1 (55.6)	10.2 (50.4)	9.6 (49.3)	11.6 (52.9)	13.6 (56.5)	16.8 (62.2)	19.7 (67.5)	22.4 (72.3)	16.8 (62.2)
Mean daily minimum °C (°F)	18.1 (64.6)	17.3 (63.1)	15.5 (59.9)	11.4 (52.5)	7.9 (46.2)	5.5 (41.9)	4.8 (40.6)	6.2 (43.2)	8.0 (46.4)	11.2 (52.2)	13.7 (56.7)	16.4 (61.5)	11.3 (52.3)
Record low °C (°F)	6.5 (43.7)	6.0 (42.8)	1.5 (34.7)	−1.0 (30.2)	−5.0 (23.0)	−8.0 (17.6)	−7.4 (18.7)	−6.4 (20.5)	−3.6 (25.5)	−1.5 (29.3)	1.0 (33.8)	2.6 (36.7)	−8.0 (17.6)
Average precipitation mm (inches)	117.5 (4.63)	115.0 (4.53)	121.9 (4.80)	104.3 (4.11)	78.9 (3.11)	49.7 (1.96)	50.3 (1.98)	54.5 (2.15)	57.2 (2.25)	117.7 (4.63)	106.6 (4.20)	105.9 (4.17)	1,079.5 (42.50)
Average precipitation days (≥ 0.1 mm)	7.6	7.3	7.9	8.0	6.0	6.0	5.9	6.0	6.6	9.0	8.5	7.9	86.7
Average snowy days	0	0	0	0	0	0	0.07	0	0	0	0	0	0.07
Average relative humidity (%)	66.7	71.4	74.7	78.9	82.1	81.1	79.5	75.6	72.5	72.7	68.2	65.5	74.1
Average dew point °C (°F)	16.9 (62.4)	17.1 (62.8)	15.8 (60.4)	12.8 (55.0)	10.0 (50.0)	6.9 (44.4)	5.8 (42.4)	7.0 (44.6)	8.4 (47.1)	11.4 (52.5)	13.3 (55.9)	15.1 (59.2)	11.7 (53.1)
Source 1: Servicio Meteorológico Nacional(temperature normals, precipitation and precipitation days) l
Source 2: NOAA (humidity, dew point, snow days 1991-2020)

== Education ==
The area once had a German school, Gartenstadt Schule *.

== History ==
On April 10, 1957, former Croatian dictator and war criminal Ante Pavelić was shot and fatally wounded by Blagoje Jovović as he stepped off a bus. Pavelić died on December 28, 1959.
