= Lucas Nicchiarelli =

Argentine professional footballer

Personal information
- Date of birth: 24 August 1996 (age 30)
- Place of birth: Buenos Aires, Argentina
- Height: 1.79 m (5 ft 10 in)
- Position: Forward

Youth career
- San Lorenzo
- 2016–2017: All Boys

Senior career*
Years	Team	Apps	(Gls)
2017–2020	All Boys	16	(3)
2020–2021	Atletico Racale		
- * Club domestic league appearances and goals

Lucas Nicchiarelli (born 24 August 1996) is an Argentine professional footballer who plays as a forward.

== Career ==
Nicchiarelli had a period in the youth system of San Lorenzo, before joining All Boys in 2016. A year later, he made a scoring impact on his professional bow after netting the final goal of a 4–0 victory over Estudiantes in Primera B Nacional on 12 June 2017; minutes after coming on as a substitute. Three appearances followed across the 2016–17 and 2017–18 seasons, with the latter concluding with relegation to Primera B Metropolitana. During his second encounter in the third tier, Nicchiarelli scored a brace against Atlanta in November 2018. They won promotion back for 2019–20, with Nicchiarelli then leaving at the end of it.

In October 2020, Nicchiarelli completed a move to Italian football with Eccellenza Apulia outfit Atletico Racale. He left the club at the end of the season.

== Career statistics ==
As of 17 October 2020.

Appearances and goals by club, season and competition
Club	Season	League			Cup		League Cup		Continental		Other		Total	
Club	Season	Division	Apps	Goals	Apps	Goals	Apps	Goals	Apps	Goals	Apps	Goals	Apps	Goals
All Boys	2016–17	Primera B Nacional	3	1	0	0	—		—		0	0	3	1
All Boys	2017–18	Primera B Nacional	1	0	0	0	—		—		0	0	1	0
All Boys	2018–19	Primera B Metropolitana	9	2	0	0	—		—		0	0	9	2
All Boys	2019–20	Primera B Nacional	3	0	0	0	—		—		0	0	3	0
Career total			16	3	0	0	—		—		0	0	16	3
