= Villa Bosch =

- District
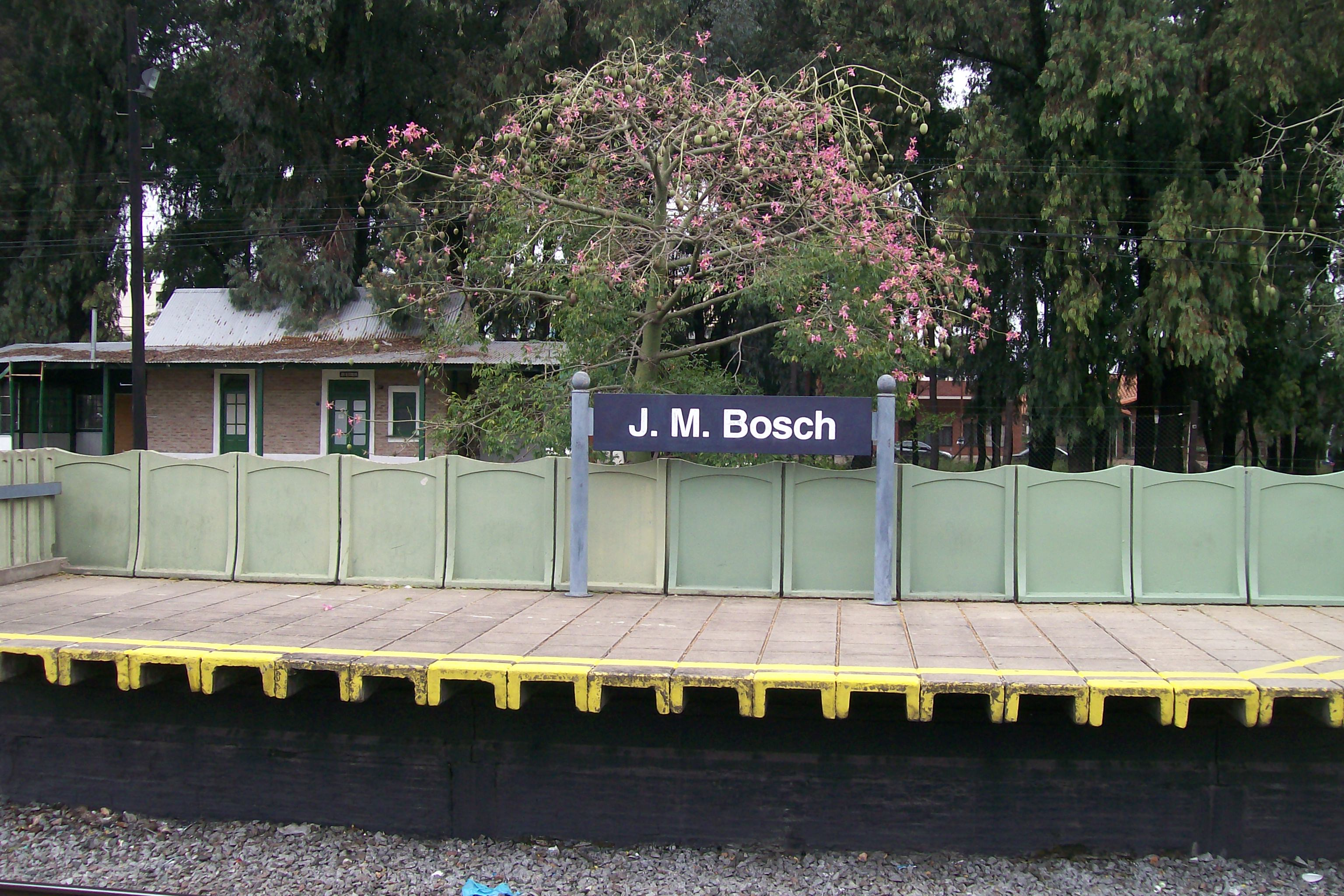
- Villa Bosch train station.

- Location in Greater Buenos Aires
- Coordinates: 34°34′S 58°34′W
- Country: Argentina
- Province: Buenos Aires
- Partido: Tres de Febrero
- Elevation: 27 m (89 ft)

Population (2001 census [INDEC])
  - Total: 24,702
  - Density: 9,500.8/km^{2} (24,607/sq mi)
- CPA Base: B 1682
- Area code: +54 11

Villa Bosch is a town in Tres de Febrero County of Buenos Aires Province, Argentina. It is located in the Greater Buenos Aires urban agglomeration.

== History ==
The territory was owned by the Bosch family in the 19th century. In 1931 the land was divided into lots and sold off, by the 1960s it had become established as a residential area.

== Industrial activity ==
In Villa Bosch is located a PSA (Peugeot / Citroën) assembly plant, which currently produces Peugeot 207's (Compact), 308's, 408's and Peugeot Partner, as well as Citroën C4 and Berlingo.
