= Churruca, Argentina =

Churruca
- District
- Location in Greater Buenos Aires
- Coordinates: 34°36′S 58°31′W
- Country: Argentina
- Province: Buenos Aires
- Partido: Tres de Febrero
- Elevation: 20 m (66 ft)

Population (2001 census [INDEC])
  - Total: 5,784
  - Density: 14,460/km^{2} (37,500/sq mi)
- CPA Base: B 1657
- Area code: +54 11

Churruca is a town in Tres de Febrero Partido of Buenos Aires Province, Argentina. It is located in the Greater Buenos Aires urban agglomeration.
