= El Libertador, Argentina =

El Libertador
- District
- Location in Greater Buenos Aires
- Coordinates: 34°34′S 58°34′W
- Country: Argentina
- Province: Buenos Aires
- Partido: Tres de Febrero
- Elevation: 27 m (89 ft)

Population (2001 census [INDEC])
  - Total: 15,108
  - Density: 11,621.5/km^{2} (30,100/sq mi)
- CPA Base: B 1657
- Area code: +54 11

El Libertador is a town in Tres de Febrero Partido of Buenos Aires Province, Argentina. It is located in the Greater Buenos Aires urban agglomeration.
