= Ciudadela, Buenos Aires =

Ciudadela
- District
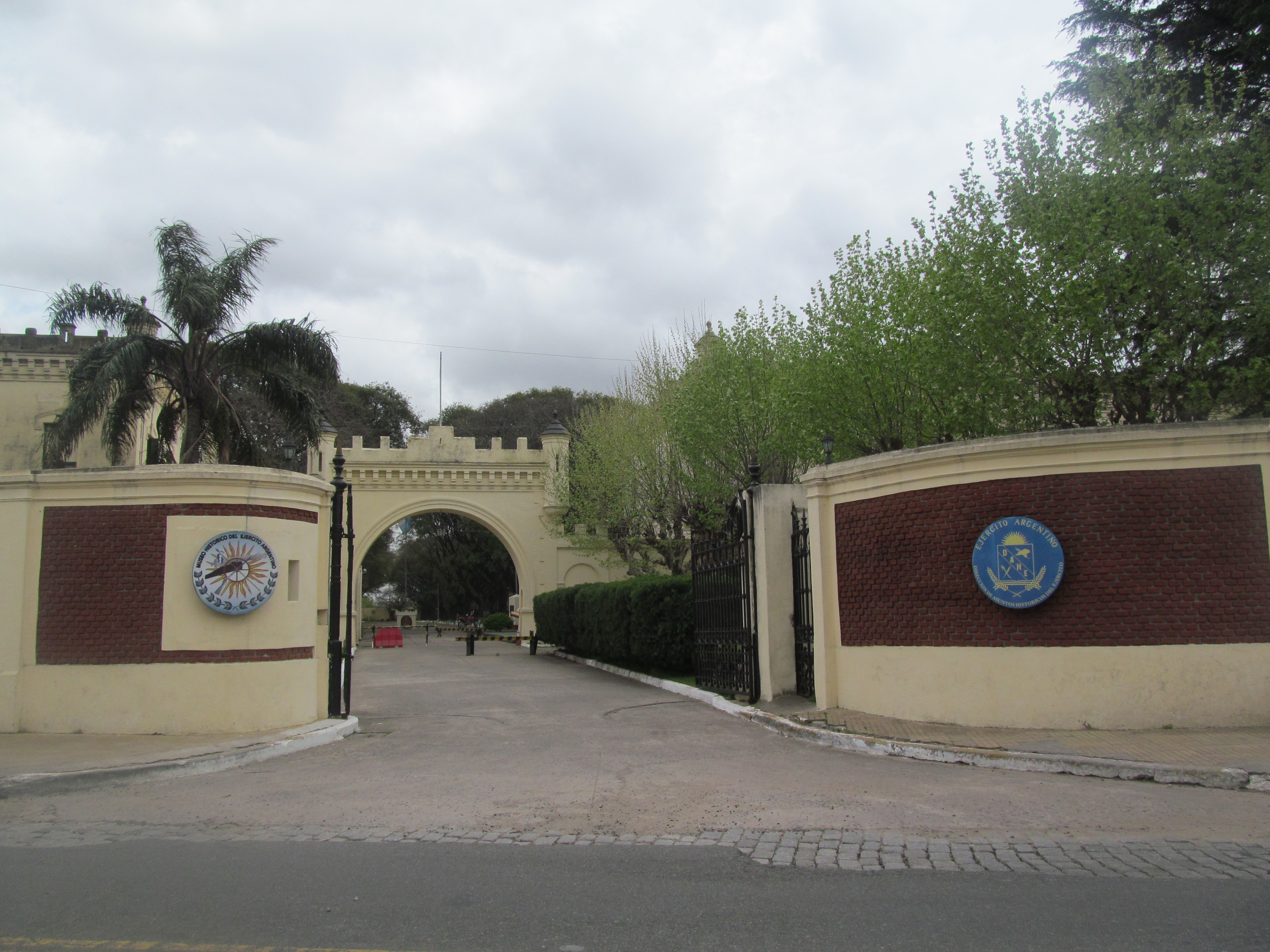
- Argentine Army Museum in Ciudadela.

- Location in Greater Buenos Aires
- Coordinates: 34°38′S 58°32′W
- Country: Argentina
- Province: Buenos Aires
- Partido: Tres de Febrero
- Founded: December 1, 1910
- Elevation: 23 m (75 ft)

Population (2001 census [INDEC])
  - Total: 73,155
- CPA Base: B 1702
- Area code: +54 11

Ciudadela is a city in Greater Buenos Aires, Buenos Aires Province, Argentina. It is located in the Tres de Febrero Partido, immediately to the west of the neighborhood of Liniers in Buenos Aires city proper. It is separated from the city by General Paz avenue.

== History ==
Home to a cattle ranch in colonial times (Rancho de Castro), the area was the site of a base of operations for Viceroy Santiago de Liniers during the British invasions of the Río de la Plata of 1806. The first settlement was named Villa Liniers in his honor, and was the site of a major military camp after 1902. The town began to take shape with the arrival of the Ferrocarril Oeste railway in 1910, and was officially established that year. Ciudadela gradually grew around the railway station, and eventually merged into the Greater Buenos Aires urban agglomeration.

Fuerte Apache, whose official name is "Barrio Ejército de los Andes" (English: Army of the Andes Barrio), is a public housing development in Ciudadela. The subject of ongoing controversy, its colloquial name stems from Fort Apache, The Bronx, a 1981 movie about a crime-ridden part of New York City.

Ciudadela had 73,155 inhabitants according to 2001 census, and features a lively commerce hub along Avenida Rivadavia, as well as two Jewish cemeteries. The historic barracks are now the Argentine Army Museum.

== Notable births ==
- Alfredo Alcón - actor
- Thiago Almada - professional footballer
- Fernando Gago - professional footballer
- Ricardo Iorio - musician
- Carlos Tevez - professional footballer
- Gianlucca Prestianni - professional footballer

== Neighborhoods ==
- Fuerte Apache
- Villa Reconquista 34°37′39.34″S 58°32′24.28″W
- Villa General Arenales 34°37′48.75″S 58°33′18.04″W
- Villa El Paredón or Los Russos 34°37′17.65″S 58°32′56.38″W
- Villa Matienzo 34°37′14.85″S 58°32′12.56″W
- Barrio San Eduardo 34°37′26.72″S 58°33′13.64″W
- Barrio Ramón Carrillo 34°37′43.77″S 58°33′33.42″W
- Villa Herminia 34°37′38.75″S 58°32′02.12″W
- Villa General Paz 34°37′57.60″S 58°31′54.86″W
- Villa La Paz 34°37′47.04″S 58°31′56.49″W
- Villa Maldonado 34°38′27.47″S 58°32′46.13″W
- Villa Weigel 34°38′42.01″S 58°31′59.04″W
- Barrio Neptuno 54 34°38′20.29″S 58°32′57.57″W
