= Colegio Militar de la Nación =

Argentine military academy

National Military College
- Colegio Militar de la Nación
- Type: military College
- Established: October 11, 1869; 156 years ago
- Undergraduates: undergraduate education of officers of the Argentine Army.
- Location: El Palomar, Buenos Aires, Argentina; 34°36′03″S 58°36′11″W
- Fight Song: March of the Military College
- Colors: Red, Blue and White
- Website: colegiomilitar.mil.ar

The National Military College (Spanish: Colegio Militar de la Nación) is the institution in charge of the undergraduate education of officers of the Argentine Army. It is located at El Palomar, Buenos Aires.

Established on October 11, 1869, by President Domingo Sarmiento at the height of the Paraguayan War, its original quarters were opened in where the Parque Tres de Febrero stands today, with Col. Juan F. Czetz as the first superintendent. It was transferred to San Martín in 1892, and to its present location, the site of the 1852 Battle of Caseros that deposed mid-19th century strongman Juan Manuel de Rosas, in 1938.

Its present facilities were inaugurated in 1937. El Palomar and La Casa de Caseros, installations involved in the Battle of Caseros, were declared a National Historic Monument.

Traditionally, most cadets belonged to high- or middle-class families, with many of them having a long military tradition. This has changed in recent years, the Corps of Cadets becoming more representative of lower-class families.

Women were first admitted in the College in 1999, and allowed into Infantry and Cavalry arms in 2013.

== Courses ==
There are four different type of courses in the College:

Regular, four-year course. For officers of the five combat branches (Infantry, Cavalry, Artillery, Engineers and Signals), plus Quartermaster and Ordnance corps. Cadets graduate as second lieutenant and get a degree in administration.

Four-year Course for professional nurses. Cadets graduate as second lieutenants and get a degree in Nursing.

One-year course for officers of the professional corps. For university graduates (in medicine, dentistry, pharmacy, biochemistry, veterinary, law, information technology and physical training) and private aviators. Graduate as either a lieutenant or second lieutenant (according to the duration of the previous career) in the relevant branch.

Two-year course for band officers. For band NCOs with at least five years of service. Graduate as second lieutenant.

A system of short courses for reserve officers was established in 2000, but was discontinued after a few years due to the poor performance of the graduates.

== Admission ==
Admission is on a competitive basis, and consists of academic (according to the course of choice), medical, psychological and physical training examinations. For the four- and three-year courses, a high school diploma is the minimum previous education requirement, although a number of applicants usually have at least one year of college-level education.

== Cadet life ==
Cadets are not referred to as freshmen, sophomores, juniors, or seniors. Instead they are officially called fourth class, third class, second class, and first class cadets. Unlike most academies the Regiment of Cadets marches on parade in the following order of precedence, in full dress uniforms:

- Infantry - with Mauser rifles and using the goose step, currently the only military unit in Argentina to do so
- Cavalry, Artillery, Engineers, Signals and services - with M4 or FN FAL slung rifles, marches on the high step
- Cavalry Troop - with lances, using the cavalry walk or trot march

The college contingent is led by the Superintendent of the College.

Formerly the College sported a horse artillery battery which used the walk or the trot march of the cavalry, in 2020, to honor the College's sesquicentennial the horse artillery was restored as a horse artillery section under the Cavalry Troop. Also, all the cadet specialty companies now have a company standard, all of these being consecrated as well that same year and now are paraded at the head of their formations.
