= Martín Coronado, Buenos Aires =

Martín Coronado
- District
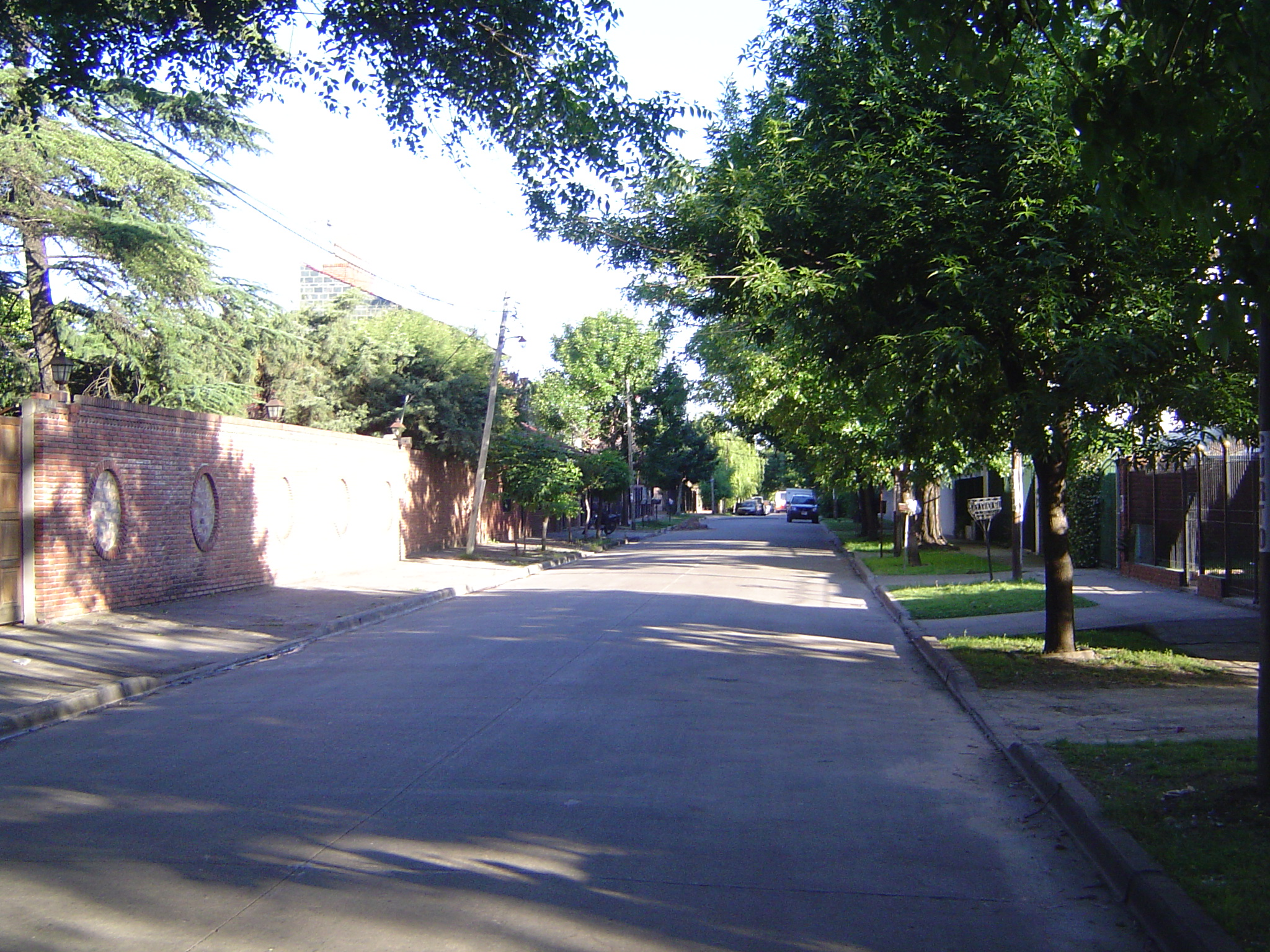
- A street in Martín Coronado

- Location in Greater Buenos Aires
- Coordinates: 34°36′S 58°33′W
- Country: Argentina
- Province: Buenos Aires
- Partido: Tres de Febrero

Population (2001 census [INDEC])
  - Total: 19,121
  - Density: 8,313.5/km^{2} (21,532/sq mi)
- CPA Base: B 1682
- Area code: +54 11

Martín Coronado is a town in the Tres de Febrero Partido of Buenos Aires Province, Argentina. It is part of the Greater Buenos Aires urban agglomeration.

== Name ==
The town was originally called Villa Lacroze after the original name of the railway station. In 1920 the population accepted a proposal that the town be renamed after Martín Coronado, an important artist in the late 19th and early 20th century who lived in the area.

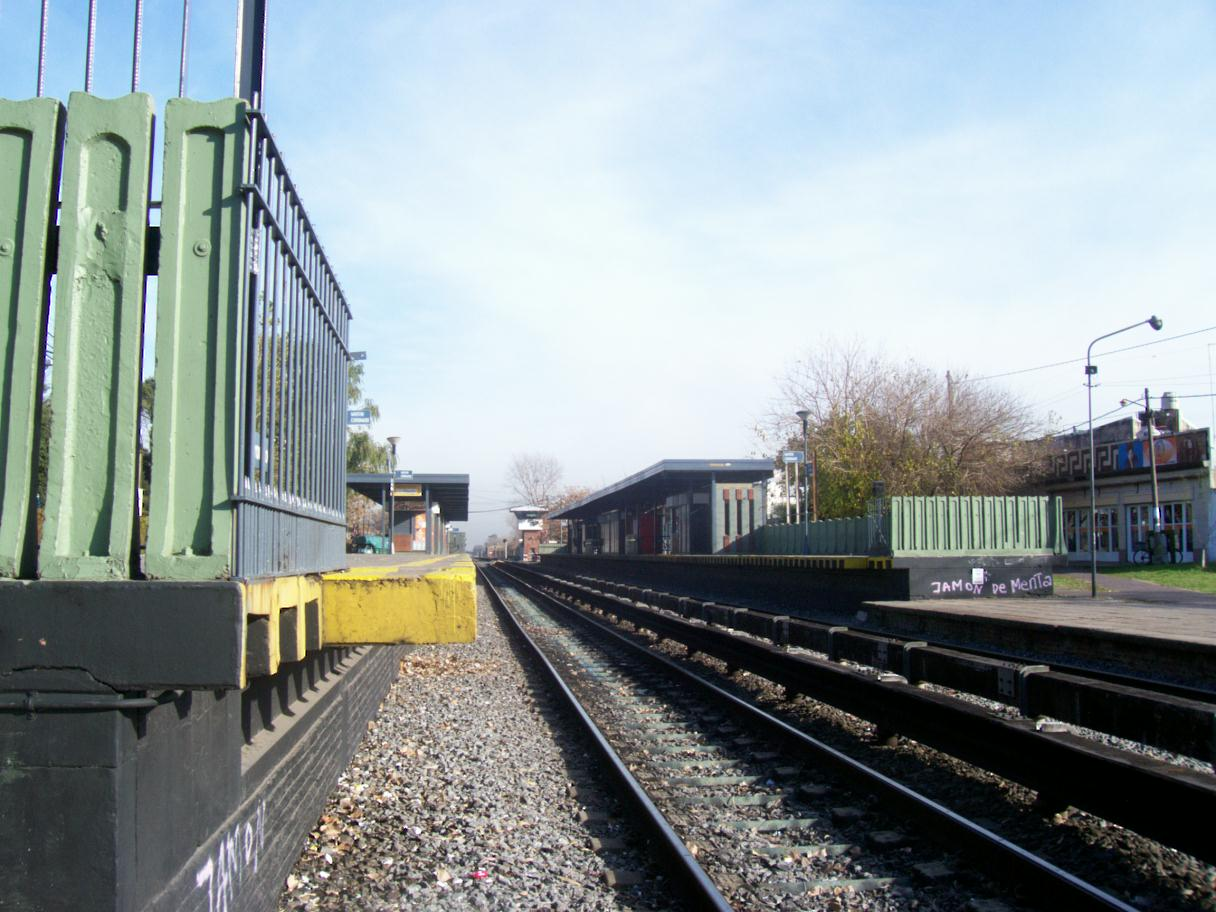
View of Martín Coronado railway station
