= Santos Lugares =

- District
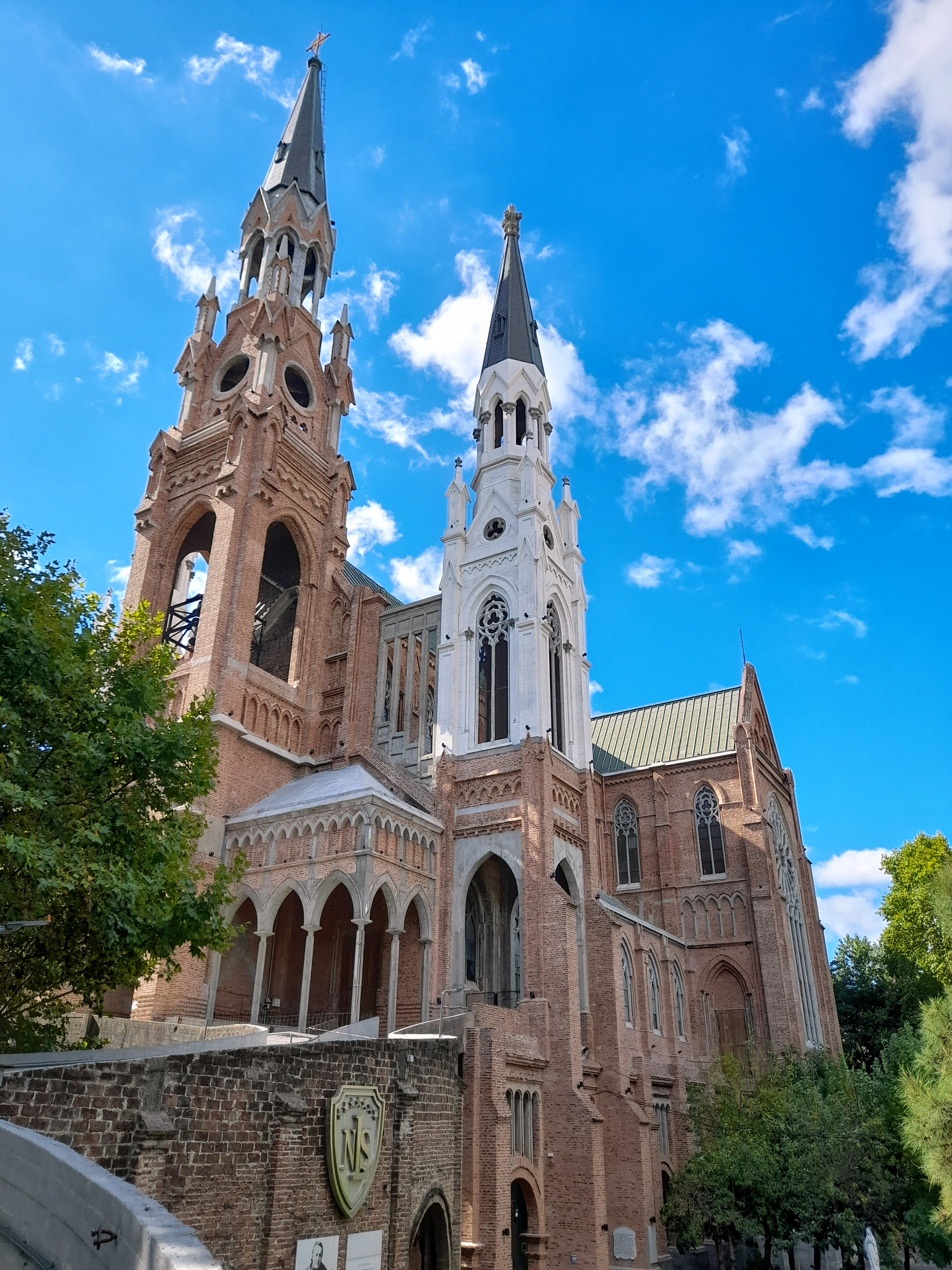
- Church of Our Lady of Lourdes

- Location in Greater Buenos Aires
- Coordinates: 34°36′S 58°33′W
- Country: Argentina
- Province: Buenos Aires
- Partido: Tres de Febrero

Population (2001 census [INDEC])
  - Total: 17,023
- CPA Base: B 1676
- Area code: +54 11

Santos Lugares is a town in the southeast of the partido of Tres de Febrero. It is part of the urban agglomeration of Greater Buenos Aires in Buenos Aires Province, northwest of the Buenos Aires city proper. According to the 2001 census [INDEC], Santos Lugares had 17,023 inhabitants.
