= List of football clubs in Argentina =

This is a non-exhaustive list of football clubs in Argentina, which is ordered according to the division they currently play in.

There are two national divisions in Argentina (Primera Division and Primera B Nacional). Below this level, leagues are split between those for clubs directly affiliated to the Argentine Football Association (mainly clubs from Greater Buenos Aires, but also some from the rest of the Buenos Aires Province and the Santa Fe Province), and those affiliated indirectly through their local leagues to the Association (covering the rest of the country). Clubs below the Primera B Nacional who are directly affiliated play in the Primera B Metropolitana, Primera C and Primera D, while those indirectly affiliated play in the Argentino A, Argentino B and Argentino C.

These leagues make up the first five tiers of Argentine football. Below the fifth tier, there are various regional leagues for clubs indirectly affiliated. On the other hand, clubs directly affiliated have no league below the fifth (Primera D), therefore a club relegated from the Primera D has to spend one year without playing (disaffiliated).

== Primera Division (2024) ==
Club	City	Stadium	Capacity
Argentinos Juniors	Buenos Aires	Diego Armando Maradona	26,000
Atlético Tucumán	Tucumán	Monumental José Fierro	35,200
Banfield	Banfield	Florencio Sola	34,901
Barracas Central	Buenos Aires	Claudio "Chiqui" Tapia	4,400
Belgrano	Córdoba	Julio César Villagra	35,000
Boca Juniors	Buenos Aires	Alberto J. Armando	57,200
Central Córdoba (SdE)	Santiago del Estero	Único Madre de Ciudades	30,000
Central Córdoba (SdE)	Santiago del Estero	Alfredo Terrera	16,000
Defensa y Justicia	Florencio Varela	Norberto "Tito" Tomaghello	12,000
Deportivo Riestra	Buenos Aires	Guillermo Laza	3,000
Estudiantes (LP)	La Plata	Jorge Luis Hirschi	30,000
Gimnasia y Esgrima (LP)	La Plata	Juan Carmelo Zerillo	24,544
Godoy Cruz	Godoy Cruz	Feliciano Gambarte	14,000
Godoy Cruz	Godoy Cruz	Malvinas Argentinas	42,000
Huracán	Buenos Aires	Tomás Adolfo Ducó	48,314
Independiente	Avellaneda	Libertadores de América	52,853
Independiente Rivadavia	Mendoza	Bautista Gargantini	24,000
Instituto	Córdoba	Monumental Presidente Perón	26,535
Lanús	Lanús	Ciudad de Lanús - Néstor Díaz Pérez	46,619
Newell's Old Boys	Rosario	Marcelo Bielsa	38,095
Platense	Florida Este	Ciudad de Vicente López	28,530
Racing	Avellaneda	Presidente Perón	55,389
River Plate	Buenos Aires	Mâs Monumental	83,196
Rosario Central	Rosario	Gigante de Arroyito	41,654
San Lorenzo	Buenos Aires	Pedro Bidegain	39,494
Sarmiento (J)	Junín	Eva Perón	19,000
Talleres (C)	Córdoba	Mario Alberto Kempes	57,000
Tigre	Victoria	José Dellagiovanna	26,282
Unión	Santa Fe	15 de Abril	22,852
Vélez Sarsfield	Buenos Aires	José Amalfitani	45,540

== Primera B Nacional (2024) ==
Club	City	Province	Stadium	Capacity
Agropecuario Argentino	Carlos Casares	Buenos Aires	Ofelia Rosenzuaig	8,000
Aldosivi	Mar del Plata	Buenos Aires	José María Minella	35,180
All Boys	Buenos Aires	Capital Federal	Islas Malvinas	12,199
Almagro	José Ingenieros	Buenos Aires	Tres de Febrero	12,500
Almirante Brown	Isidro Casanova	Buenos Aires	Fragata Presidente Sarmiento	25,000
Alvarado	Mar del Plata	Buenos Aires	José María Minella	35,180
Arsenal	Sarandí	Buenos Aires	Julio Humberto Grondona	16,300
Atlanta	Buenos Aires	Capital Federal	Don León Kolbowsky	14,000
Atlético de Rafaela	Rafaela	Santa Fe	Nuevo Monumental	16,000
Brown	Adrogué	Buenos Aires	Lorenzo Arandilla	4,500
Chacarita Juniors	Villa Maipú	Buenos Aires	Chacarita Juniors	19,000
Chaco For Ever	Resistencia	Chaco	Juan Alberto García	23,000
Colón	Santa Fe	Santa Fe	Brigadier General Estanislao López	40,000
Defensores de Belgrano	Buenos Aires	Capital Federal	Juan Pasquale	9,000
Defensores Unidos	Zárate	Buenos Aires	Mario Lossino	6,000
Deportivo Madryn	Puerto Madryn	Chubut	Abel Sastre	8,000
Deportivo Maipú	Maipú	Mendoza	Omar Higinio Sperdutti	8,000
Deportivo Morón	Morón	Buenos Aires	Nuevo Francisco Urbano	32,000
Estudiantes (BA)	Caseros	Buenos Aires	Ciudad de Caseros	16,740
Estudiantes (RC)	Río Cuarto	Córdoba	Antonio Candini	15,000
Ferro Carril Oeste	Buenos Aires	Capital Federal	Ricardo Etcheverri	24,442
Gimnasia y Esgrima (J)	Jujuy	Jujuy	23 de Agosto	23,200
Gimnasia y Esgrima (M)	Mendoza	Mendoza	Víctor Legrotaglie	11,500
Gimnasia y Tiro	Salta	Salta	Gigante del Norte	24,300
Güemes	Santiago del Estero	Santiago del Estero	Arturo Miranda	15,000
Guillermo Brown	Puerto Madryn	Chubut	Raúl Conti	15,000
Mitre	Santiago del Estero	Santiago del Estero	José y Antonio Castiglione	10,500
Nueva Chicago	Buenos Aires	Capital Federal	Nueva Chicago	28,500
Patronato	Paraná	Entre Ríos	Presbítero Bartolomé Grella	22,000
Quilmes	Quilmes	Buenos Aires	Centenario	35,200
Racing (C)	Córdoba	Córdoba	Miguel Sancho	15,000
San Martín (SJ)	San Juan	San Juan	Ingeniero Hilario Sánchez	17,000
San Martín (T)	Tucumán	Tucumán	La Ciudadela	30,250
San Miguel	Los Polvorines	Buenos Aires	Malvinas Argentinas	7,176
San Telmo	Dock Sud	Buenos Aires	Osvaldo Baletto	2,000
Talleres (RE)	Remedios de Escalada	Buenos Aires	Pablo Comelli	16,000
Temperley	Temperley	Buenos Aires	Alfredo Beranger	13,000
Tristán Suárez	Tristán Suárez	Buenos Aires	20 de Octubre	15,000

== Metropolitana ==
=== Primera B Metropolitana (2024) ===
Club	City/Neighborhood	Area	Stadium
Acassuso	Boulogne Sur Mer	Greater Buenos Aires	La Quema
Argentino (M)	Merlo	Greater Buenos Aires	Estadio Argentino de Merlo
Argentino (Q)	Quilmes	Greater Buenos Aires	Estadio Argentino de Quilmes
Cañuelas	Cañuelas	Buenos Aires Province	José Arin
Colegiales	Florida Oeste	Greater Buenos Aires	Libertarios Unidos
Comunicaciones	Agronomía	City of Buenos Aires	Alfredo Ramos
Deportivo Armenio	Ingeniero Maschwitz	Buenos Aires Province	República de Armenia
Deportivo Laferrere	Gregorio de Laferrère, Buenos Aires	Buenos Aires Province	Ciudad de Laferrere
Deportivo Merlo	Merlo, Buenos Aires	Greater Buenos Aires	José Manuel Moreno
Excursionistas	Belgrano, Buenos Aires	Buenos Aires	Excursionistas
Dock Sud	Dock Sud	Greater Buenos Aires	de los Inmigrantes
Fénix	Pilar	Buenos Aires Province	(none)
Ferrocarril Midland	Libertad	Buenos Aires Province	Ciudad de Libertad
Flandria	Jáuregui	Buenos Aires	Carlos V
Liniers	San Justo	Greater Buenos Aires	Juan Antonio Arias
Los Andes	Lomas de Zamora	Greater Buenos Aires	Eduardo Gallardón
Sacachispas	Villa Soldati	City of Buenos Aires	Beto Larossa
San Martín (B)	Burzaco	City of Buenos Aires	Francisco Boga
Sportivo Italiano	Ciudad Evita	Greater Buenos Aires	República de Italia
UAI Urquiza	Villa Lynch	Greater Buenos Aires	Monumental de Villa Lynch
Villa Dálmine	Campana	Buenos Aires	El Coliseo de Mitre y Puccini
Villa San Carlos	Berisso	Greater Buenos Aires	Genacio Sálice

=== Primera C Metropolitana (2024) ===
Club	City	Province	Stadium
Argentino (R)	Rosario	Santa Fe Province	José María Olaeta
Atlas	General Rodríguez	Buenos Aires	Ricardo Puga
Berazategui	Berazategui	Buenos Aires	Norman Lee
Central Ballester	José L. Suárez	Greater Buenos Aires	Predio Cacique
Central Córdoba (R)	Rosario	Santa Fe	Gabino Sosa
Centro Español	Villa Sarmiento	Greater Buenos Aires	(none)
Claypole	Claypole	Buenos Aires	Rodolfo Capocasa
Defensores de Cambaceres	Ensenada	Buenos Aires Province	Defensores de Cambaceres
Deportivo Español	Buenos Aires City	Buenos Aires	Nueva España
Deportivo Paraguayo	Constitución	Buenos Aires City	(none)
El Porvenir	Gerli	Greater Buenos Aires	Estadio Gildo Francisco Ghersinich
General Lamadrid	Buenos Aires City	Buenos Aires	Enrique Sexto
Ituzaingó	Ituzaingó	Greater Buenos Aires	Carlos Sacaan
Justo José de Urquiza	El Libertador	Buenos Aires	Ramón Roque Martín
Juventud Unida	Muñiz	Greater Buenos Aires	Ciudad de San Miguel
Leandro N. Alem	General Rodríguez	Buenos Aires	Leandro N. Alem
Lugano	Tapiales	Greater Buenos Aires	José María Moraños
Luján	Luján	Buenos Aires	Municipal de Luján
Mercedes	Mercedes	Buenos Aires Province	Liga Mercedina,
Muñiz	Muñiz	Greater Buenos Aires	(none)
Puerto Nuevo	Campana	Buenos Aires	Rubén Vallejos
Real Pilar	Pilar	Buenos Aires	Carlos Barraza
Sportivo Barracas	Barracas, Buenos Aires	Buenos Aires City	(none)
Victoriano Arenas	Valentin Alsina	Buenos Aires	Saturnino Moure
Yupanqui	Buenos Aires City	Buenos Aires	Ciudad Evita

=== Torneo Promocional Amateur (2024) ===
Club	City	Province	Stadium
Atlético Pilar	Pilar	Buenos Aires	Atlético Pilar
Barracas	Buenos Aires	Buenos Aires	(none)
Belgrano (Z)	Zárate	Buenos Aires	Luis Vallejos
Camioneros	9 de Abril, Esteban Echeverría	Buenos Aires	Hugo Moyano
Defensores de Glew	Glew	Buenos Aires	Glorioso de Parque Roma
Deportivo Metalúrgico	Del Viso, Pilar	Buenos Aires	Deportivo Metalúrgico
Estrella de Berisso	Berisso	Buenos Aires	José Manuel Chiche Vicente
Estrella del Sur	Alejandro Korn	Buenos Aires	Claudio Chiqui Tapia
Everton (LP)	Villa Elvira, La Plata	Buenos Aires	Oscar Funes
Ezeiza	Ezeiza	Buenos Aires	Santiago Maratea
Juventud de Bernal	Bernal	Buenos Aires	(none)
Náutico Hacoaj	Tigre	Buenos Aires	Náutico Hacoaj
SAT	Moreno	Buenos Aires	12 de Agosto
Unión Deportivo Provincial	Empalme Lobos, Lobos	Buenos Aires	Enrique Chiosso

== Rest of the Country ==
=== Zone A ===
Team	City	Province	Stadium
Cipolletti	Cipolletti	Río Negro	La Visera de Cemento
Círculo Deportivo	Comandante Nicanor Otamendi	Buenos Aires	Guillermo Trama
Germinal	Rawson	Chubut	El Fortín
Liniers	Bahía Blanca	Buenos Aires	Alejandro Pérez
Olimpo	Bahía Blanca	Buenos Aires	Roberto Natalio Carminatti
Sansinena	General Cerri	Buenos Aires	Luis Molina
Santamarina	Tandil	Buenos Aires	Municipal General San Martín
Club Sol de Mayo	Viedma	Río Negro	El Coliseo
Villa Mitre	Bahía Blanca	Buenos Aires	El Fortín

=== Zone B ===
Team	City	Province	Stadium
Argentino	Monte Maíz	Córdoba	Modesto Marrone
Atenas	Río Cuarto	Córdoba	9 de Julio
Ciudad de Bolivar	San Carlos de Bolívar	Buenos Aires	Municipal Eva Perón
Estudiantes	San Luis	San Luis	Héctor Odicino - Pedro Benoza
Ferro Carril Oeste	General Pico	La Pampa	El Coloso del Barrio Talleres
Huracán Las Heras	Las Heras	Mendoza	General San Martín
Juventud Unida Universitario	San Luis	San Luis	Mario Diez
San Martín	San Martín	Mendoza	Libertador General San Martín
Sportivo Peñarol	Chimbas	San Juan	Ramón Pablo Rojas

=== Zone C ===
Team	City	Province	Stadium
Defensores	Pronunciamiento	Entre Ríos	Delio Cardozo
Defensores de Belgrano	Villa Ramallo	Buenos Aires	Salomón Boeseldín
Douglas Haig	Pergamino	Buenos Aires	Miguel Morales
El Linqueño	Lincoln	Buenos Aires	Leonardo Costa
Gimnasia y Esgrima	Concepción del Uruguay	Entre Ríos	Manuel y Ramón Núñez
Independiente	Chivilcoy	Buenos Aires	Raúl Orlando Lungarzo
Sportivo Belgrano	San Francisco	Córdoba	Oscar Boero
Sportivo Las Parejas	Las Parejas	Santa Fe	Fortaleza del Lobo
Unión	Sunchales	Santa Fe	La Fortaleza

=== Zone D ===
Team	City	Province	Stadium
9 de Julio	Rafaela	Santa Fe	Germán Solterman
Boca Unidos	Corrientes	Corrientes	Leoncio Benítez
Central Norte	Salta	Salta	Doctor Luis Güemes
Crucero del Norte	Garupá	Misiones	Andrés Guacurarí
Gimnasia y Tiro	Salta	Salta	Gigante del Norte
Juventud Antoniana	Salta	Salta	Fray Honorato Pistoia
San Martín	Formosa	Formosa	17 de Octubre
Sarmiento	Resistencia	Chaco	Centenario
Sol de América	Formosa	Formosa	Sol de América

== Local Leagues ==
The following is an incomplete list of clubs currently playing at the regional level, sorted by province and league.

- List of regional football leagues in Argentina

== Other Clubs ==
- Club Deportivo Bangladesh Argentina
