= La Martona =

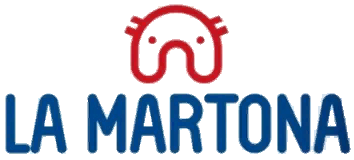

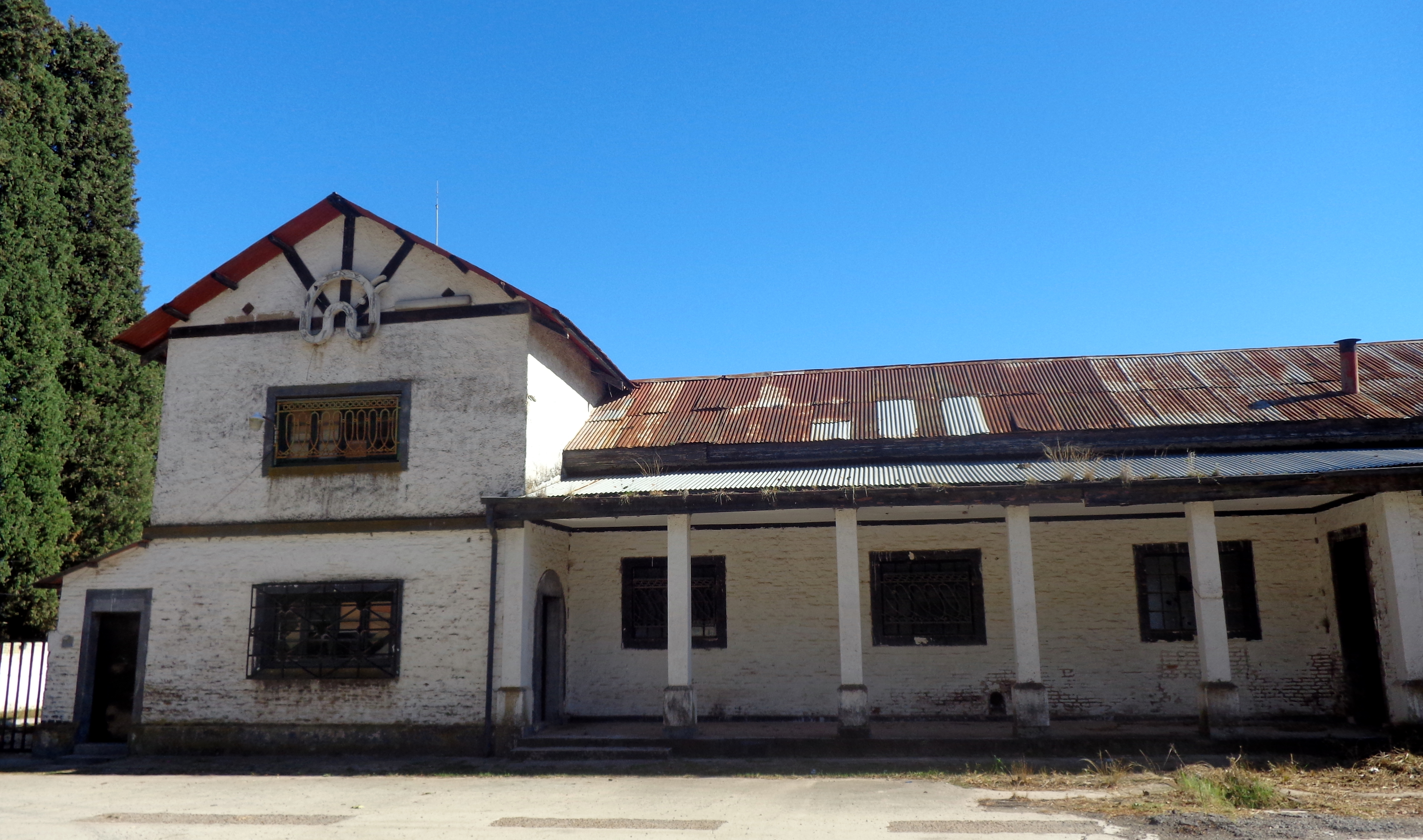
- Former building of La Martona at Estancia San Martín, pictured in 2015
- Type: Private company (1889–1978); Brand (1978–present)
- Industry: Dairy
- Founded: 1889 in Argentina
- Founder: Vicente Lorenzo Casares
- Defunct: 1978; 48 years ago
- Fate: Declared bankruptcy, brand acquired by Mastellone Hnos. in 1978
- Headquarters: Vicente Casares, Cañuelas, Argentina
- Products: Milk, butter, dulce de leche, yogurt

La Martona is an Argentine dairy brand, currently owned by La Serenísima. La Martona was originally the first dairy company of Argentina, established in 1889 by Vicente Lorenzo Casares in Cañuelas Partido. La Martona was a pioneer in the local industry due to its control of not only products manufacturing but distribution and commercialization.

The company is regarded for its technological advancement in the pasteurization and other milk processing, with the acquisition of modern machinery from Europe and the U.S. and the development of rail lines for goods transport.

La Martona operated until 1978, when it fell into bankruptcy and the brand name was acquired by rival company La Serenísima (legal name: "Mastellone Hnos.") in a judicial sale. Since then, the company has owned exclusive rights to La Martona brand name.

== History ==
=== First years and expansion ===
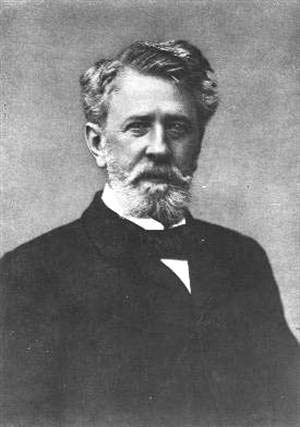
Vicente L. Casares, founder of La Martona

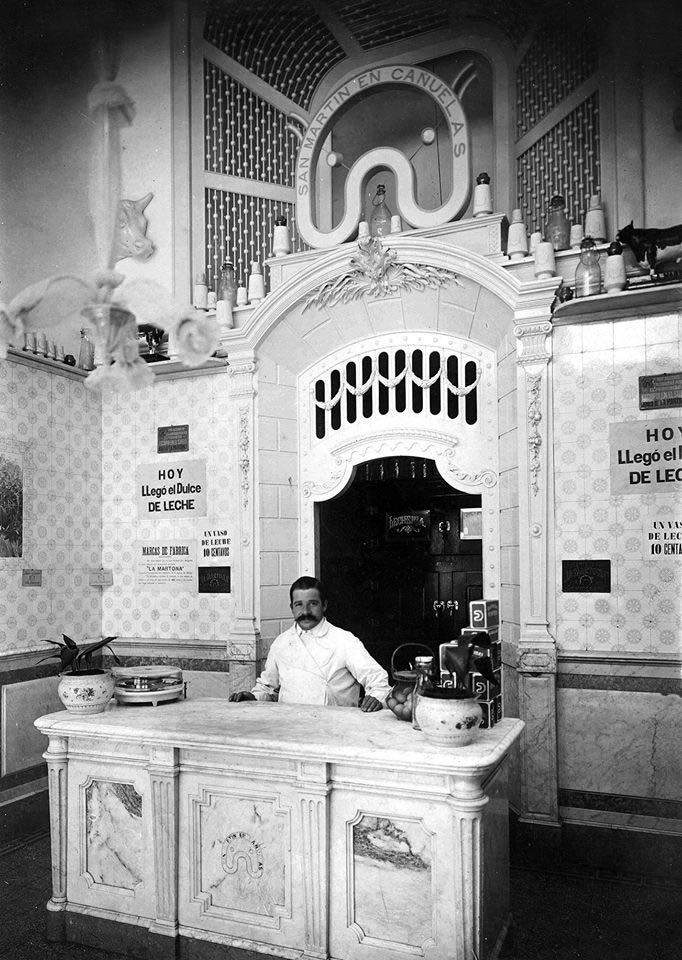
La Martona store in Buenos Aires, c. 1908

La Martona was the first dairy company of Argentina, having been founded by Vicente Casares in 1889. Casares (1848–1910) was an agriculture producer, who owned a ranch, San Martín, in Cañuelas, Buenos Aires. In 1874, he visited the United States and Europe, where he gained experience to establish his business.

The name La Martona was taken from "Marta", Casares' daughter, who was later mother of famous writer Adolfo Bioy Casares. The factory was located alongside the Vicente Casares railway station of Cañuelas Partido.

The company managed all the products process, from the first phases of production to marketing and commerce, being the first to pasteurize milk in Argentina. Starting in 1890, La Martona was the first company to use parchment paper as package to package butter, replacing fabric used until then. In 189,3 the company exported its first products to the United Kingdom while in 1902, La Martona starting production of dulce de leche.

French journalist Jules Huret wrote after a visit made to La Martona in 1911:

I must remark that La Martona plant has a milk processing which is superior than any other in Europe, except Copenhagen. The great Balle dairy that distributes most part of milk in Berlin does not reach such grade of perfection; otherwise, its quality stands below Mr. Casares' milk.

By 1908, La Martona helped Argentina to become the second largest yogurt producer worldwide. Apart from managing the company, Vicente Casares had a prolific career as politician, serving as deputy, president of Partido Autonomista and president of the Argentine National Bank among other charges) died in 1910. His son, Vicente Rufino took over the company.

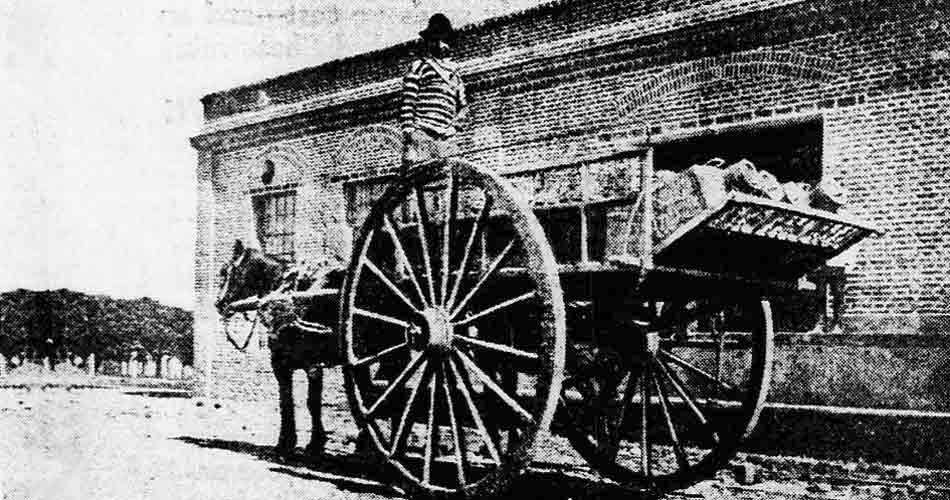
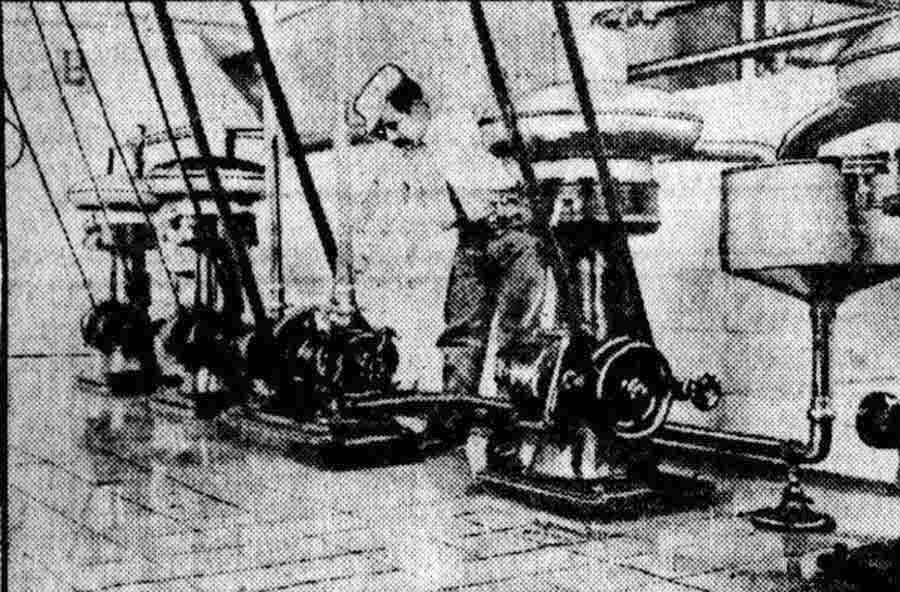
Two images published on The Sunday Star, March 1915, depicting images of La Martona plant in Vicente Casares

On an article published on March 7, 1915, The Sunday Star (the Sunday edition of newspaper The Washington Star) described La Martona as "the biggest milk farm in the world". The article was written by journalist and photographer Frank G. Carpenter, who gave his impression about the factory which butter was being exported to the U.S. He praised the machinery used (noting that machines came from Australia and Europe), and the clean-up of the factory he visited. His article also added information, stating that La Martona produced more than 7,258,000 kg of butter per year, while the farm had 18,000 cows to produce milk.

In 1916, La Martona acquired the first milk separator of Argentina, brought from Oelde, Germany. In 1923, the company brought the first packaging machines from Switzerland. Between 1935 and 1941, La Martona introduced the use of refrigerated vehicles. During those years, the number of lecherías (daire products retail stores) increased their number.

In 1942, "Estancias Martona S.A." was established as the animal husbandry division of the company, which only dedicated to industrial activities since then. The division had ha22,000 including own and rented lands in 8 towns, 17,000 Holando-Argentino and 1,200 pedigree cattle. Estancias Martona had also 70 dairy where 4,800 cows where milked per day.

=== Bankruptcy and brand takeover ===
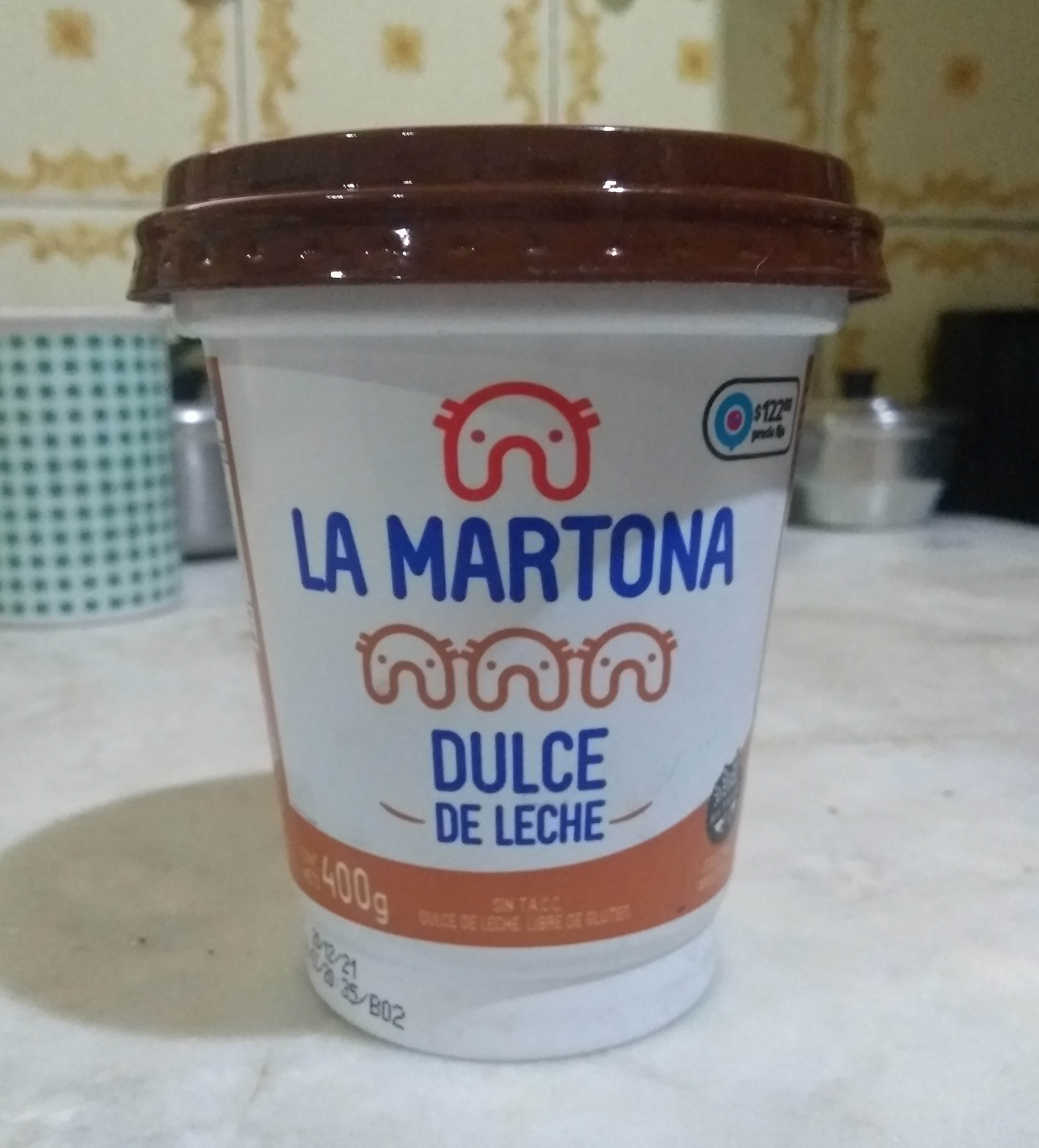
La Martona branded dulce de leche, manufactured by Mastellone Hnos.

La Martona ceased operations in 1978. Due to the company's debts it was declared bankruptcy and was acquired by Mastellone Hnos. (La Serenísima) for the symbolic value of AR$ 1 in a judicial sale. But it was not until 2019, that La Serenísima launched a line of products under the brand name La Martona, adding it to its brand portfolio.

On November 27, 1989, the Argentine Chamber of Deputies named Cañuelas "national home to dairy industry", to mark the 100th. anniversary of La Martona's foundation. In 1997, the building at estancia San Martín was declared national historic monument by Decree No. 262.

Nowadays La Martona is one of the brand names of Mastellone Hnos., which commercialises it along with other brands such as La Armonía.

== Company image ==
The most renowned image of the company was a cat's head, a symbol used for livestock branding, a typical tradition in the country. Famous writers Jorge Luis Borges and Bioy Casares (who was Vicente Casares' grandson), wrote an advertising brochure for La Martona, with a brief introduction to its history and detailing the qualities of its soured milk.
