= Torneo Promocional Amateur =

Argentine association football league

- Founded: 2023; 3 years ago
- Country: Argentina
- Confederation: CONMEBOL
- Number of clubs: 17 (2026)
- Level on pyramid: 5
- Promotion to: Primera C
- Domestic cup: Copa Argentina
- Current champions: Barrancas UMET (2026)
- Most championships: Camioneros (1); Deportivo Metalúrgico (1); Estrella del Sur (1)
- Broadcaster: TNT Sports

The Torneo Promocional Amateur is the fifth level of the Argentine football league system for clubs directly affiliated with the AFA. Established in 2023, it replaced Primera D, which was dissolved after its edition that same year.

According to the requirements of the competition, players must be under 26 years of age with no history of previous contracts signed.

== History ==
In 2023 the last edition of the Primera D took place, because from 2024 on, the category would be unified with the Primera C in a single tournament.

The Primera D was replaced by the "Torneo Promocional Amateur", with 14 invited clubs. The first season was held in 2024.

== Current teams (2026) ==
Club	City	Area / region	Venue
Alumni	Los Hornos	La Plata	(none)
Atlético Pilar	Pilar	Buenos Aires Province	Atlético Pilar
Barrancas	Buenos Aires	Autonomous city	(none)
Belgrano	Zárate	Buenos Aires Province	Luis Vallejos
Buenos Aires City	Buenos Aires	Autonomous city	(none)
Control Orientado	Benavídez	Tigre	(none)
Defensores de Glew	Glew	Greater Buenos Aires	Glorioso de Parque Roma
Deportivo Metalúrgico	Del Viso	Buenos Aires Province	Deportivo Metalúrgico
Estrella de Berisso	Berisso	Buenos Aires Province	José Manuel Vicente
Everton	La Plata	Buenos Aires Province	Oscar Funes
FC Ezeiza	Ezeiza	Greater Buenos Aires	Santiago Maratea
Juventud de Bernal	Bernal	Greater Buenos Aires	(none)
Las Mandarinas	Brandsen	Buenos Aires Province	Genaro Omar Redruello
Náutico Hacoaj	Tigre	Greater Buenos Aires	Náutico Hacoaj
SAT	Moreno	Greater Buenos Aires	12 de Agosto
Unión Deportivo Provincial	Empalme Lobos	Buenos Aires Province	Enrique Chiosso
Uribelarrea FC	Uribelarrea	Buenos Aires Province	Alberto Pinto Caetano

== Champions ==
Ed.	Season		Champion	Runner-up
1	2024	Apertura	Camioneros (1)	Estrella del Sur
1	2024	Clausura	Estrella del Sur (1)	Camioneros
2	2025		Deportivo Metalúrgico (1)	Ezeiza
3	2026		Barrancas UMET (1)	SAT

== Titles by club ==
Club	Titles	Years won
Barrancas UMET	1	2026
Camioneros	1	2024 Apertura
Deportivo Metalúrgico	1	2025
Estrella del Sur	1	2024 Clausura
