= Torneo Regional (1967–1986) =

- Organising body: AFA
- Founded: 1967
- Folded: 1986
- Country: Argentina
- Confederation: CONMEBOL
- Number of clubs: Variable
- Promotion to: Argentine Primera División

Torneo Regional was a promotion championship which formed the second level of the Argentine football league system.

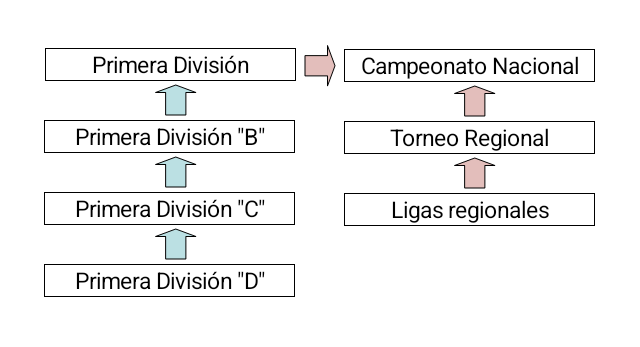
Torneo Regional in the Argentine Argentine football league system between 1974 and 1985.

It operated in parallel with Primera B Metropolitana, which covered the Greater Buenos Aires metropolitan area.

== List of champions ==
| Season | Winners |
|---|---|
| 1967 | Central Córdoba (SdE); Chaco For Ever; San Lorenzo (MdP); San Martín (M) |
| 1968 | Belgrano; Huracán (IW); Independiente Rivadavia; San Martín (T) |
| 1969 | Desamparados; San Lorenzo (MdP); San Martín (M); San Martín (T); Talleres (C) |
| 1970 | Gimnasia y Esgrima (J); San Martín (SJ) |
| 1971 | Central Córdoba (SdE); Don Orione; Guaraní Antonio Franco; Huracán (CR); Huracán (IW); Juventud Antoniana; San Martín (M) |
| 1972 | Bartolomé Mitre (P); Desamparados; Gimnasia y Esgrima (M); Independiente (Trelew) |
| 1973 | Belgrano; Chaco For Ever; Cipolletti; Gimnasia y Esgrima (J); Juventud Antoniana; Kimberley (MdP) |
| 1974 | Altos Hornos Zapla; Atlético Regina; Chaco For Ever; Central Norte; Desamparados; Deportivo Mandiyú; Huracán (CR); Huracán (SR); Jorge Newbery (Junín); Puerto Comercial |
| 1975 | Atlético Tucumán; Bartolomé Mitre (P); Belgrano; Cipolletti; Jorge Newbery (Junín); Juventud Alianza |
| 1976 | Atlético Ledesma; Huracán (CR); San Martín (T); Sportivo Patria |
| 1977 | Atlético Ledesma; Cipolletti; Los Andes (SJ); Sarmiento (R) |
| 1978 | Atlético Ledesma; Deportivo Roca; Patronato; San Martín (M) |
| 1979 | Atlético Ledesma; Chaco For Ever; Cipolletti; Juventud Unida Universitario |
| 1980 | Atlético Concepción; Chaco For Ever; Cipolletti; Independiente Rivadavia |
| 1981 | Atlético Tucumán; Guaraní Antonio Franco; Huracán (SR); Loma Negra |
| 1982 | Atlético Concepción; Deportivo Roca; Estudiantes (SdE); Guaraní Antonio Franco; Independiente Rivadavia; Mariano Moreno; Racing (C); Renato Cesarini |
| 1983 | Andino; Atlético Concepción; Atlético Santa Rosa; Chaco For Ever; Loma Negra; Renato Cesarini |
| 1984 | Atlético Ledesma; Atlético Uruguay; Estudiantes (RC); Ferro Carril Oeste (GP); Olimpo; Unión (GP) |
| 1985 | Argentino (Firmat); Belgrano; Central Norte; Cipolletti; Guaraní Antonio Franco; Juventud Alianza; Ramón Santamarina |
| 1985–86 | Alianza de Cutral Có; Belgrano; Concepción FC; Guaraní Antonio Franco; Güemes; Olimpo |

== See also ==
- Argentine football league system
- List of football clubs in Argentina
