= Club Deportivo Bangladesh Argentina =

Argentinian football club

Club Deportivo Bangladesh-Argentina
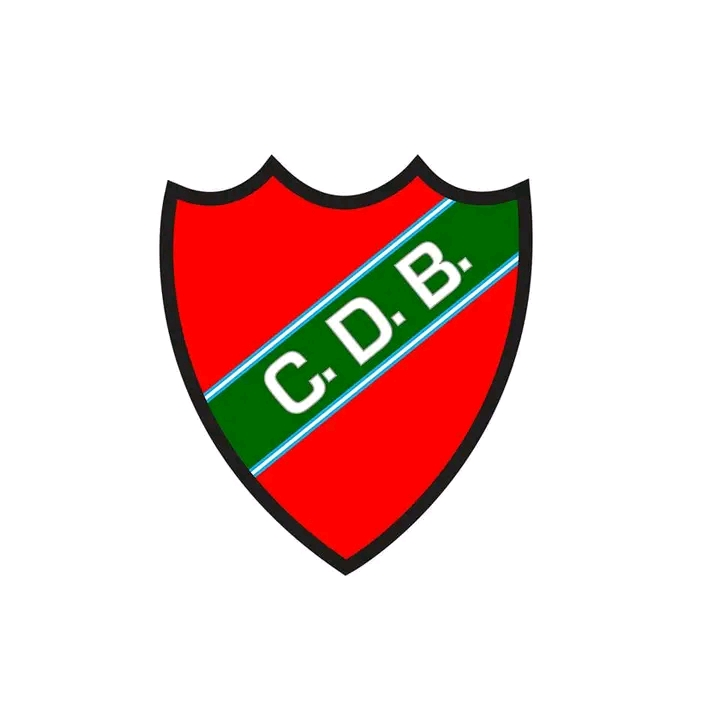
- Full name: Club Deportivo Bangladesh-Argentina
- Nicknames: CD Bangladesh, CDB
- Founded: 16 December 2022; 3 years ago
- Chairman: (Argentina) Dylan Forciniti (President) (Bangladesh) Md. Yasin Al Ahad (Vice President)
- League: Torneo Commercial
- Website: Facebook

Club Deportivo Bangladesh-Argentina is an amateur football club based in the town of Carmen de Areco in Buenos Aires Province, Argentina. The club currently does not partake in the Argentine football league system.

== History ==
The club, named after Bangladesh, was launched on 16 December 2022, two days before the 2022 FIFA World Cup final between Argentina and France.

The club's first recorded match was a club friendly with 'Club Social y Deportivo All-Haz', a club from the regional league Liga Mercedina de Fútbol. The match ended in a 3-2 win for Deportivo Bangladesh.

As of January 2024, the club does not compete in the Argentine football league system, and are aiming to compete in Argentine Football Association affiliated leagues. The club released a statement via their Facebook page that they are unable to participate in official AFA tournaments due to lack of sponsors and funding. However, Deportivo Bangladesh has been competing in 'Torneo Commercial', an amateur club tournament held in Carmen de Areco with 7 other amateur teams in the area. CD Bangladesh won the tournament on 27 July 2024, after defeating amateur club 'Textil' won the tournament on 27 July 2024, after defeating amateur club 'Textil'.

== Record ==
Season	League	Pld	W	D	L	GF	GA	GD	Pos	Ref
2024	Torneo Commercial - Inicial	7	6	0	1	20	7	+13	1	
2024	Torneo Commercial - Final	6	4	1	1	18	7	+11	1	

Key to league record:

- Pld = Matches played
- W = Matches won
- D = Matches drawn
- L = Matches lost
- GF = Goals scored
- GA = Goals against
- GD = Goal difference
- Pts = Points
- Pos = Final position
- Ref = Reference citation

== Notable Fixtures ==
31 December 2023 Friendly	CD Bangladesh-Argentina	3–2	All-Haz	Mercedes, Buenos Aires, Argentina
	Mercadov 69'; Romero 81' (pen.), 90+3' (pen.)	Report	Nicolas 63'; Riberra 69'	Stadium: Liga Mercedina De Futbol

== See also ==
- List of football clubs in Argentina
