= Alejandro Petión =

Town in Buenos Aires Province, Argentina

- Town
- Location within Buenos Aires Province
- Coordinates: 35°18′S 58°36′W
- Country: Argentina
- Province: Buenos Aires
- Partidos: Cañuelas
- Established: 2 May 1954 (72 years ago)
- Elevation: 26 m (85 ft)

Population (2001 Census)
  - Total: 2,874
- Time zone: UTC−3 (ART)
- CPA Base: B 7221
- Climate: Dfc

Alejandro Petión is a town located in the Cañuelas Partido in the province of Buenos Aires, Argentina.

== Name ==
The town is named after Alexandre Pétion, who fought in the Haitian Revolution in the 18th and 19th centuries. The community was established on 2 May 1954. A sculpture in honor of Petión was erected in the town in 2022.

== History ==
The land that made up the town was originally inhabited by settlers from the British Isles, who used the area for grazing.

== Population ==
According to INDEC, which collects population data for the country, the town had a population of 2,874 people as of the 2001 census.
