= La Serenísima =

Argentine dairy company

Mastellone Hermanos S.A.
- Trade name: La Serenísima
- Type: S.A.
- Industry: Food
- Founded: October 29, 1929; 97 years ago in Argentina
- Founder: Antonino Mastellone
- Headquarters: General Rodríguez, Buenos Aires Province, Argentina
- Key people: Pascual Mastellone (Co-owner, president, 1952–2013); Ernesto Arenaza (Director)
- Products: Dairy products
- Brands: List: La Serenísima; Actimel; Armonía; Danette; Danonino; Finlandia; Junior; La Martona; Sense; Ser; Serenito; Vidacol; Yogurísimo
- Revenue: US$900 million (2018)
- Owner: Grupo Arcor; Danone
- Number of employees: 3,500 (2018)
- Website: laserenisima.com.ar

Mastellone Hermanos S.A. (mostly known for its trade name: La Serenísima) is an Argentine dairy company headquartered in the city of General Rodríguez in Buenos Aires Province. The company, founded by Antonino Mastellone in 1929, owned by Grupo Arcor and multinational Danone.

Starting as a small firm to produce cheese, the company expanded until becoming the leader in the Argentine dairy market and one of the largest companies in the country. The name La Serenísima was taken from an Italian aviation squadron that fought in the World War I.

Pascual Mastellone, son of founder Antonio, had a long tenure of chairman of the company taking over La Serenísima for more than 50 years from 1952 until 2013, when he retired due to health problems. Mastellone died in 2014.

By 2018, the company had sales for US$900 million, processing more than 3,2 million liters of milk per day.

== History ==
=== Development ===
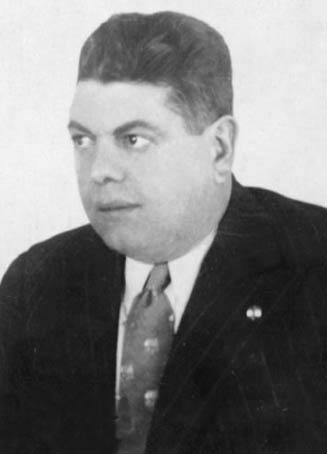
Antonino Mastellone, founder. He was in charge until his death in 1952, being succeeded by his son Pascual.

Italian immigrant Antonino Mastellone, a cheese-maker from Sardinia who arrived in Argentina in 1925, started producing mozzarella and ricotta in his home of General Rodríguez, a pampas city west of Buenos Aires. Mastellone delivered the products himself to Buenos Aires by train, selling it in La Boca, Barracas, and San Telmo neighborhoods, where most part of Italian immigrants had settled and were consumers of those cheeses.

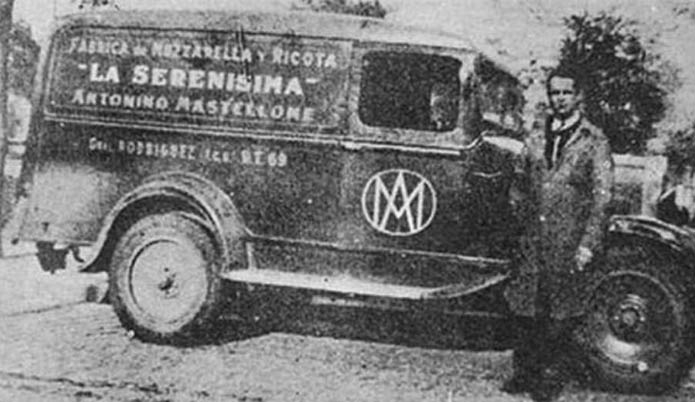
La Serenísima truck, c. 1935. The business started as a mozzarella and ricotta factory, acquiring its first truck (pictured) in 1935.

Antonino Mastellone married Teresa Aiello on October 26, 1929, and that date was set as the official for the establishment of the company. Mastellone brought his first delivery truck in 1935, and incorporated the company in 1942; Mastellone named his venture in honor of La Serenissima, a World War I-era Italian Air Force battalion which on orders to bombard Vienna, released a load of fliers urging peace, instead. The battalion itself had been named for the medieval Republic of Venice, which was widely known as La Serenissima (though the word also translates as the "most serene," or peaceful).

By 1960, the company had become one of the few in Argentina which mass-produced pasteurized milk, allowing it to sell the product year-round. Establishing its own research laboratory in 1964, La Serenísima became the first in Argentina to provide nutritional facts on each bottle. In 1978, Mastellone Hnos. acquired rights to brand name La Martona, which having been established in 1889, was the first dairy company of Argentina. La Martona had ceased operations in 1978, after it was declared bankruptcy due to its debts. Nevertheless, Mastellone Hnos. did not market La Martona products until 2019, when it released an economic line of milk.

The company pioneered the sale of lactose-free milk in Argentina in 1984, became the market leader in the sale of yogurt (whose local consumption more than doubled between 1983 and 1988) and introduced cultured milk locally, in 1988. La Serenísima also introduced large-scale organic dairy farming in Argentina, in 1994, and became the first to fortify its products with iron sulfate.

=== Expanding its products ===
In 1994, La Serenísima began selling not-from-concentrate, perishable juices through a joint venture with Tropicana, then owned by Seagram. The partnership combined La Serenísima's distribution network for chilled products with Tropicana's juice business. The venture was formed by Pascual Mastellone and Mike Harbison, of Tropicana, and later ended after Tropicana was acquired by PepsiCo.

The company entered into a joint venture with French retail foods group Danone in 1996 for the manufacture, sale and distribution of yogurt and desserts under the La Serenísima brand. It continued to develop products for the local market, including phytosterol-enriched milk in 2000, juices for infants in 2001, and linoleic acid-enriched milk in 2003. It also became more active in public service efforts, such as the establishment of an environmental impact bureau in 2002 and a fund-raising effort for the non-profit Favaloro Foundation in 2003.

La Serenísima processed more than 4.8 million tons of milk annually by the early 2000s. Through Danone, it introduced Activia to the Argentine market in 2005. In June 2009, Danone reportedly entered into talks to acquire 100% of Mastellone Hermanos S.A., La Serenísima's parent company, although Mastellone's debt, reported at US$260 million, and opposition attributed to former President Néstor Kirchner complicated the negotiations. During the 2010s, the company launched additional products in alliance with Grupo Danone and Cabrales, as well as other dairy-derived products produced by the company.

In 2019, La Serenísima added La Armonía to its line of lower-priced brands, marketing milk and dulce de leche under the Armonía name. Armonía products alternated in the market with La Martona as La Serenísima's economy products.

In September 2024, the company announced that nearly 63% of its energy supply came from renewable energy after signing an agreement with MSU Green Energy.

== Products ==
The following is a list containing the products manufactured and commercialized by Mastellone. This chart also include the other brands of the group.

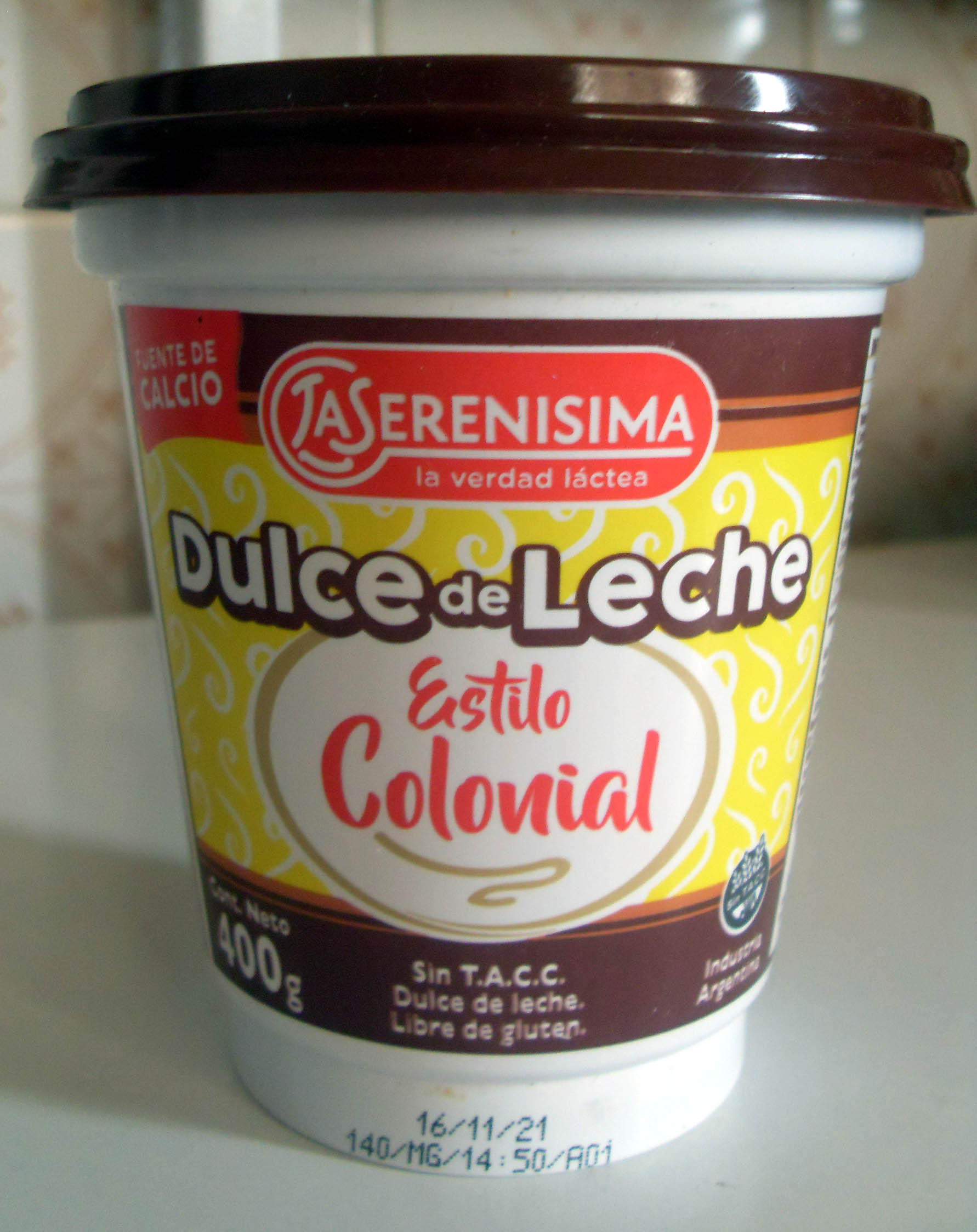
Dulce de leche "estilo colonial"

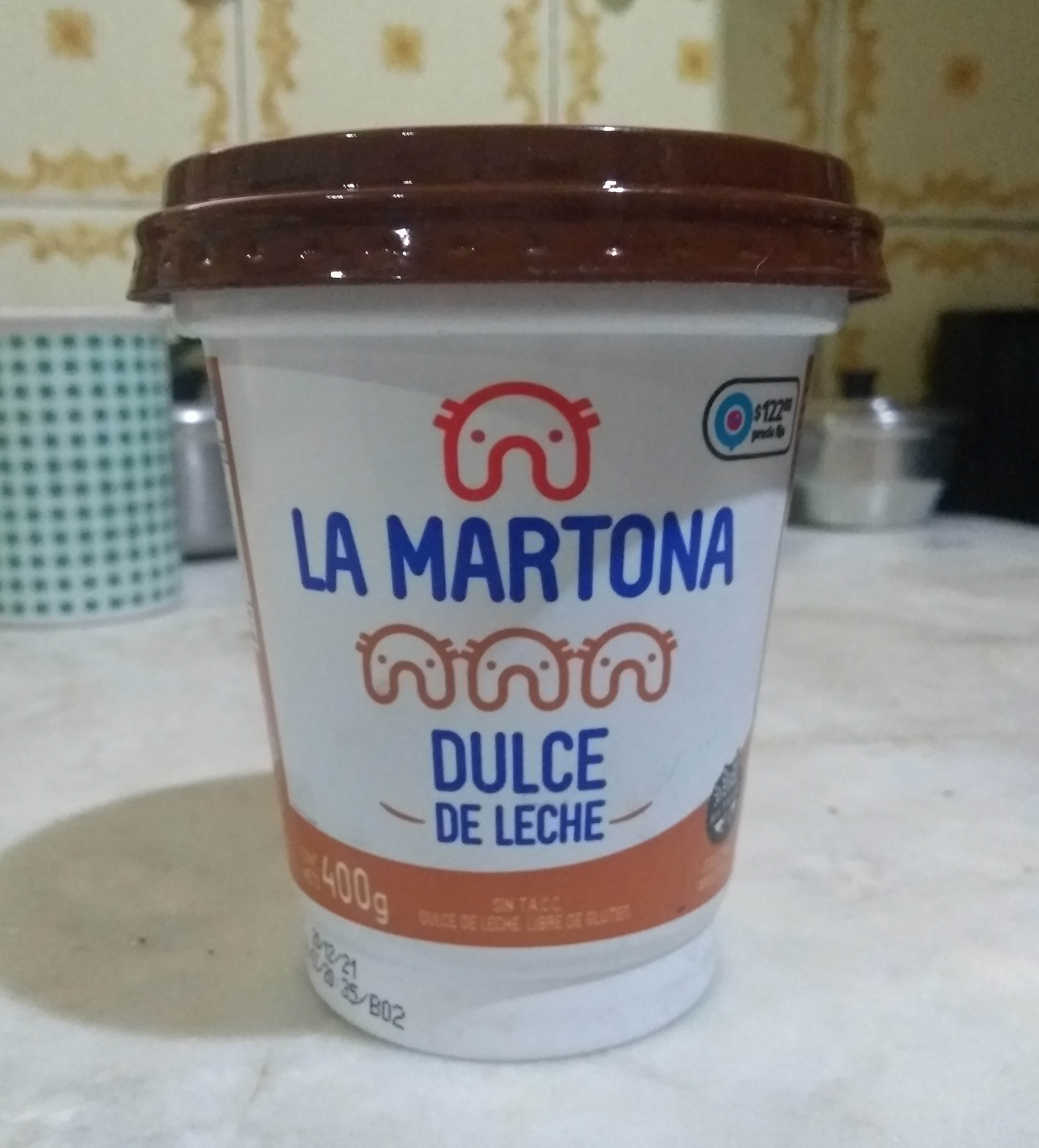
La Martona branded dulce de leche

| Brand | Products |
|---|---|
| La Serenísima | Milk, powdered milk, chocolate flavoured milk, dulce de leche, butter, yogurt, cream, fruit juice-combined milk, cheese |
| Actimel | Probiotic yogurts |
| Armonía | Milk, dulce de leche |
| Danette | Desserts |
| Danonino | Probiotic yogurt |
| Finlandia | Cheese, cream cheese, sauce |
| Junior | Fruit juice-combined milk |
| La Martona | Milk, dulce de leche, yogurt |
| Sense | Fruit juice-combined milk |
| Ser | Fruit juice-combined milk, probiotic milk, yogurts, diet yogurts, diet desserts |
| Serenito | Desserts |
| Vidacol | Probiotic yogurts |
| Yogurísimo | Yogurt |

== Advertising ==
In the 1960s, La Serenísima hired cook pioneer Petrona C. de Gandulfo (who had become a celebrity after publishing her cookbook El libro de Doña Petrona in 1934) to make recipes using La Serenísima cheeses. The result was a brochure named El Recetario de Doña Petrona as an advertising piece of the company.

In 1995, the company acquired a blimp for advertising purposes. The blimp (manufactured by British company Airship Industries) was 59 m long, 19 m wide, and 20 m high. It was powered by two Porsche engines, reaching a maximum speed of 100 km/h. The airship's envelope capacity was 63,000 m3 of helium and it had a flight range of 17 hours.

The blimp made several trips along Argentina between 1995, and November 22, 1996, when it had to make an emergency landing due to bad weather. The strong wind (100 km/h) destroyed the blimp. Fortunately, no injuries were recorded. Former F1 driver Carlos Reutemann was in the area at the moment of the accident, providing assistance to the crew.
