= Argentine football league system =

- Country: Argentina
- Sport: Association football
- Promotion and relegation: Yes

National system
- Federation: Argentine Football Association
- Confederation: CONMEBOL
- Top division: Primera División
- Second division: Primera Nacional
- Cup competition: Copa Argentina; Supercopa Argentina; Trofeo de Campeones; Supercopa Internacional

The Argentine football league system include tournaments organised by the Argentine Football Association. Clubs affiliated to the body compete in the tournaments, which are split into categories or divisions.

Rules establish a system of promotion and relegation, a process where teams are transferred between two divisions based on their performance for the completed season. The best-ranked team or teams in the lower division are promoted to the higher division for the next season, and the worst-ranked team or teams in the higher division are relegated to the lower division for the next season.

== Current league system (2026) ==
Below the second division championship (Primera Nacional), tournaments leagues are split between two groups, the first of them include the promotion/relegation system for clubs directly affiliated to AFA playing in Primera B, Primera C and Torneo Promocional Amateur. Those are usually called "zona metropolitana" (metropolitan zone) because those tournaments have been historically played by teams from the city of Buenos Aires and the Greater Buenos Aires, plus the addition of twenty-two clubs from cities near Buenos Aires like La Plata, Zarate, Campana, Luján, Junín, General Rodríguez, Cañuelas, Pilar and Mercedes and Rosario and Santa Fe in the Santa Fe Province. The second group is formed for clubs indirectly affiliated to AFA that play in regional leagues, under the supervision of Consejo Federal (es), dependent on the AFA. Competitions reserved for those clubs are Torneo Federal A and Torneo Regional Federal.

Argentine football league system (2026)
Level	Divisions	
	Clubs directly affiliated to AFA	Clubs indirectly affiliated to AFA
1	Primera División; 30 clubs	
2	Primera Nacional; 36 clubs	
3	Primera B 22 clubs	Torneo Federal A 37 clubs
4	Primera C 28 clubs	Torneo Regional Federal Amateur; 332 clubs
5	Torneo Promocional Amateur; 12 clubs	Regional leagues

== History ==
Tournaments organised by the Association and its predecessors have been held since 1893 (the year when the current AFA was established). Nevertheless, the first championship was organised by the Argentine Association Football League (the first organised body in the country) in 1891. Although the AAFL was dissolved that same year, AFA has recognised that championship as the first Primera División competition, adding it to its continuity.

Until the creation of Campeonato Nacional in 1967, only clubs directly affiliated to AFA had taken part in tournaments organised by the body. From 1986, with the creation of Campeonato Nacional B, teams from regional leagues (clubs indirectly affiliated to AFA) added to the regular competition.

== Historic tables ==
The following charts detail all league competitions organised by the Argentine Association (National cups are not included):

=== Year by year ===
Argentine football league system historical table (1891–present)
Period	Level 1	Level 2	Level 3	Level 4	Level 5	Level 6
1891–1898	Primera División					
1899	Primera División	Segunda División				
1900–1910	Primera División	Segunda División	Tercera División			
1911	Primera División	División Intermedia	Segunda División	Tercera División		
1912–1914	Primera División (AFA) Primera División (FAF)	División Intermedia (AFA) División Intermedia (FAF)	Segunda División (AFA) Segunda División (FAF)	Tercera División (AFA) Tercera División (FAF)		
1915–1918	Primera División	División Intermedia	Segunda División	Tercera División		
1919–1926	Primera División (AFA) Primera División (AAmF)	División Intermedia (AFA) División Intermedia (AAmF)	Segunda División (AFA) Segunda División (AAmF)	Tercera División (AFA) Tercera División (AAmF)		
1927–1930	Primera División	Primera División B	División Intermedia	Tercera División		
1931–1932	Primera División (LAF)	(no teams competing)				
1931–1932	Primera División (AFA)	Primera División B (AFA)	División Intermedia (AFA)	Tercera División (AFA)		
1933	Primera División (LAF)	(no teams competing)				
1933	Primera División (AFA)	Segunda División (AFA)	Tercera División (AFA)			
1934	Primera División (LAF)	Segunda División (LAF)	(no teams competing)			
1934	Primera División (AFA)	Segunda División (AFA)	Tercera División (AFA)			
1935–1942	Primera División	Segunda División	Tercera División			
1943–1946	Primera División	Segunda División	Primera Amateur			
1947–1948	Primera División	Segunda División	Tercera División			
1949	Primera División	Primera División B	Tercera División			
1950–1961	Primera División	Primera División B	Segunda División	Tercera División		
1962–1966	Primera División	Primera División B	Primera División C	División Superior de Fútbol Aficionado		
1967–1985	Primera División (Metropolitano / Nacional)	Primera División B	Primera División C	Primera División D		
1967–1985	Primera División (Metropolitano / Nacional)	Torneo Regional	Regional Leagues			
1985–1986	Primera División	Primera División B	Primera División C	Primera División D		
1985–1986	Primera División	Torneo Regional	Regional Leagues			
1986–1995	Primera División	Torneo Nacional B	Primera B	Primera C	Primera D	
1986–1995	Primera División	Torneo Nacional B	Torneo del Interior (es)	Regional Leagues		
1995–2005	Primera División	Primera B Nacional	Primera B	Primera C	Primera D	
1995–2005	Primera División	Primera B Nacional	Torneo Argentino A	Torneo Argentino B	Regional Leagues	
2005–2014	Primera División	Primera B Nacional	Primera B	Primera C	Primera D	
2005–2014	Primera División	Primera B Nacional	Torneo Argentino A	Torneo Argentino B	Torneo Argentino C	Regional Leagues
2014	Primera División	Primera B Nacional	Primera B Torneo Federal A	Primera C	Primera D	
2014	Primera División	Primera B Nacional	Primera B Torneo Federal A	Torneo Federal B	Torneo Argentino C	Regional Leagues
2015–2017	Primera División	Primera B Nacional	Primera B Torneo Federal A	Primera C	Primera D	
2015–2017	Primera División	Primera B Nacional	Primera B Torneo Federal A	Torneo Federal B	Torneo Federal C (es)	Regional Leagues
2017–2018	Superliga	Primera B Nacional	Primera B Torneo Federal A	Primera C	Primera D	
2017–2018	Superliga	Primera B Nacional	Primera B Torneo Federal A		Torneo Federal C (es)	Regional Leagues
2018–2019	Superliga	Primera B Nacional	Primera B Torneo Federal A	Primera C Torneo Regional Federal Amateur	Primera D Regional Leagues	
2019–2020	Superliga	Primera Nacional	Primera B Torneo Federal A	Primera C Torneo Regional Federal Amateur	Primera D Regional Leagues	
2021–2023	Primera División	Primera Nacional	Primera B Torneo Federal A	Primera C Torneo Regional Federal Amateur	Primera D Regional Leagues	
2024–present	Primera División	Primera Nacional	Primera B Torneo Federal A	Primera C Torneo Regional Federal Amateur	Torneo Promocional Amateur Regional Leagues	

=== By tournament ===
Defunct competitions indicated in

Argentine football league system historical table (1891–present)
Division	Level 1	Level 2	Level 3	Level 4	Level 5	Level 6
Primera División	1891–present					
División Intermedia		1911–1926	1927–1932			
Primera B		1899–1910; 1927–1985	1911–1926; 1986–present			
Torneo Regional		1967–1986				
Primera Nacional		1986–present				
Primera C			1900–1910; 1927–1985	1911–1926; 1986–present		
Primera D				1950–1985	1986–2023	
Torneo del Interior (es)			1986–1995			
Torneo Argentino A			1995–2014			
Torneo Federal A			2014–present			
Torneo Argentino B				1995–2014		
Torneo Federal B				2014–2017		
Torneo Argentino C					2005–2014	
Torneo Federal C (es)					2015–2018	
Torneo Regional Federal Amateur				2018–present		
Regional Leagues			1967–1985	1986–1995	1995–2005; 2018–present	2005–2018
Torneo Promocional Amateur					2024–present	
