= Branko de Tellería =

Argentine footballer

Personal information
- Date of birth: 12 November 1991 (age 34)
- Place of birth: Cañuelas, Argentina
- Height: 2.00 m (6 ft 6 1/2 in)
- Position: Goalkeeper

Team information
- Current team: Huracán
- Number: 31

Youth career
- Cañuelas

Senior career*
Years	Team	Apps	(Gls)
2008–2010	Cañuelas		
2010–2011	Huracán	0	(0)
2011	Banfield II		
2018–2020	Cañuelas		
- * Club domestic league appearances and goals

Branko de Tellería (born 12 November 1991), nicknamed Cigarro (in English: cigar), is an Argentine former football goalkeeper.
