= Felipa Larrea =

Argentine former slave (1810–1910)

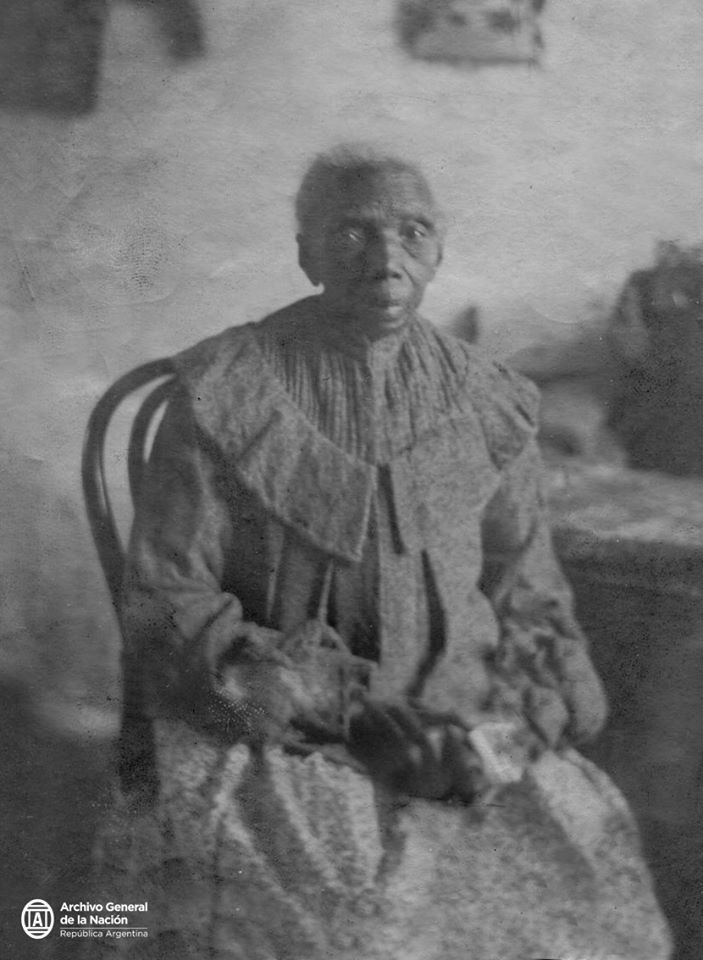
- Larrea in 1909
- Born: 1 May 1810; Buenos Aires, Viceroyalty of the Rio de la Plata
- Died: 18 January 1910 (aged 99); Cañuelas, Argentina
- Citizenship: See list: Spain (until 1816); United Provinces of the Río de la Plata (1816–1831); Argentine Confederation (1831–1852); State of Buenos Aires (1852–1861); Argentina (from 1861)
- Known for: Last surviving Afro-Argentine slave from the colonial period
- Spouse: Ignacio Sibile Larrea
- Children: 11 – 14

Felipa Larrea de Larrea (1 May 1810 – 18 January 1910) was an Argentine woman, widely considered to be the last surviving African slave from the colonial period in Argentina.

== Early life ==
Felipa Larrea was born on 1 May 1810, 24 days before the Revolución de Mayo, which triggered the Argentine War of Independence. Her father was an African American slave by the name of Juan Larrea, who had been bought by Spanish-born merchant and politician Juan Larrea, whose surname he bore. Felipa's mother was María Magdalena Rodríguez, an African slave born in what is now Equatorial Guinea who had been in service of Don Patricio Salas.

As a girl, Felipa was bought by Justa Visillac de Rodríguez, wife of José Antonio Rodríguez. The Rodríguez family were members of the Basílica de Nuestra Señora de la Merced, the oldest Roman Catholic congregation in Buenos Aires. She was brought up in the Casa de Ejercicios Espirituales "Sor María Antonia de la Paz y Figueroa", in what is now the Buenos Aires neighbourhood of Constitución.

== Freedwoman ==
She served in the households of Valentín Díaz, Josefa Lavalle and Marcó del Pont, successively. She was, at some point early into her adulthood, declared a freedwoman. She continued to serve in domestic positions in various households of aristocratic families of Buenos Aires, such as that of Bernardino Rivadavia, first president of the Argentine Republic.

On 30 July 1833, she married Ignacio Sibile Larrea at the Parroquia de la Inmaculada Concepción, on Avenida Independencia. Ignacio Sibile Larrea, born in the Congo, had also been in the service of Juan Larrea, and had served as a cook for Juan Galo de Lavalle. The newlyweds were both married as freed citizens.

Sources differ on the exact number of children born to Felipa and Ignacio Sibile Larrea. The second national census, conducted in 1895, accounted for fourteen children, while a 1909 Caras y Caretas article numbered her offspring at 11. Ignacio died on 2 March 1869, aged 70, in their home on Chile 426.

=== Later years ===
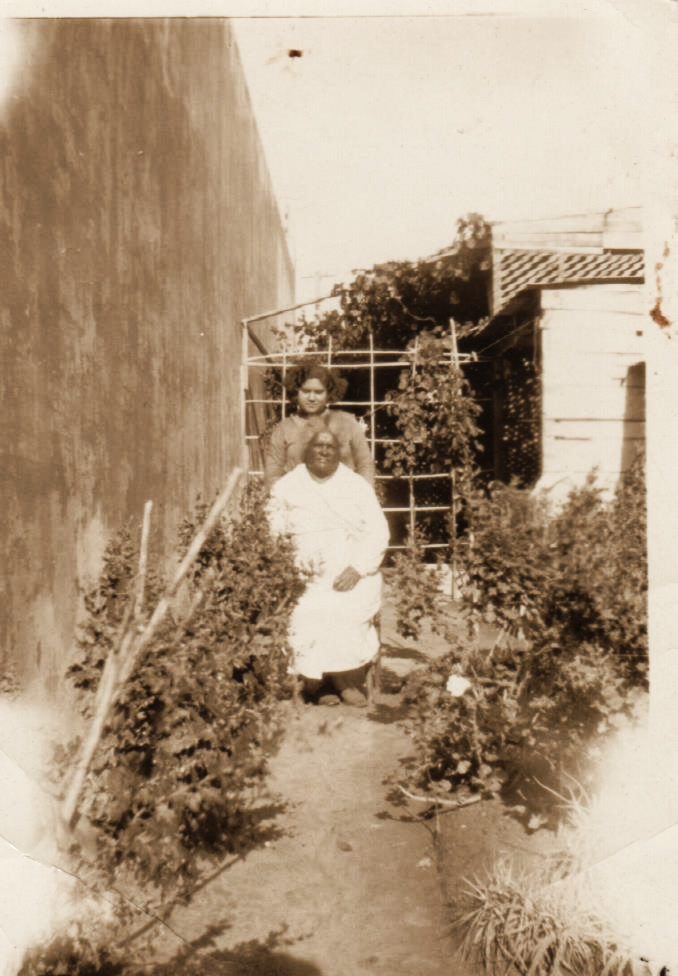
Ramona Larrea (sitting), granddaughter of Felipa and Ignacio Larrea.

She gained notoriety after being featured at the aforementioned Caras y Caretas article, published on 27 November 1909 (issue 582). In the article, she described her misfortunes and the hardships she had faced in the aftermath of her emancipation, having lived her entire life in extreme poverty. The article described Felipa as counting with a "prodigal memory", as she was able to easily recall a number of historical events she had witnessed – such as the execution of Camila O'Gorman by firing squad in 1848, "the memory of which still made her shudder in horror".

She lived her later years in Cañuelas, Buenos Aires, alongside her youngest daughter, Magdalena. Magdalena would die in 1909, aged 59. Overall, it is estimated Felipa outlived all of her children, in addition to her husband and her in-laws. By the time she died on 18 January 1910, her only surviving family were her grandchildren, who lived in Barracas and worked odd jobs. She was interred at the municipal cemetery in Cañuelas, at a parcel owned by local businessman José Lino Aráoz.

== Legacy ==
In recent years, the memory of Felipa's life and times has been recalled by Afro-Argentine activist groups seeking to erase the pervailing idea of Argentina as a "white nation", wherein the Afro-Argentine population has disappeared. In 2022, the Deliberative Council of Cañuelas named a street after Felipa.
