= Gobernador Udaondo =

- Town
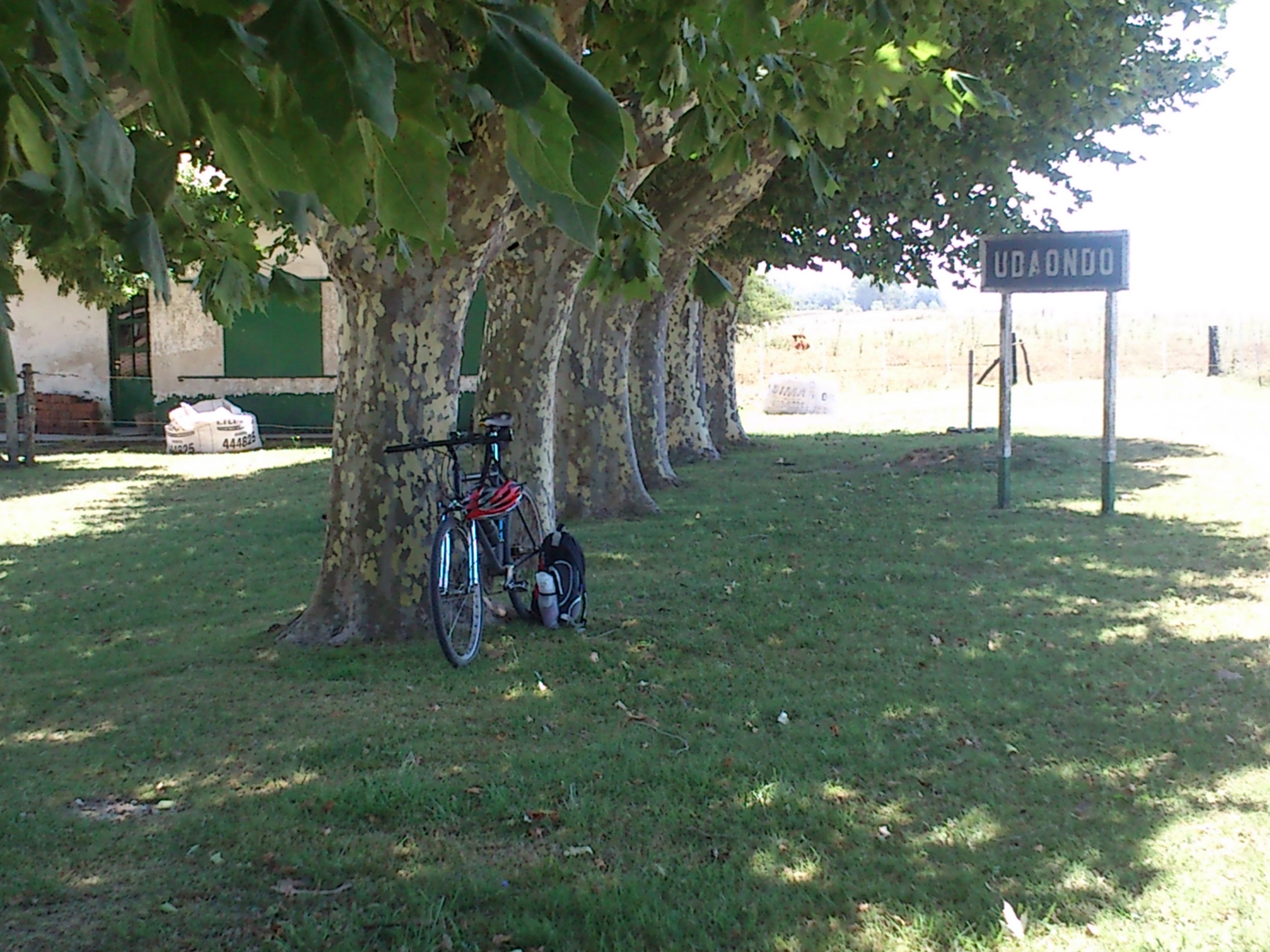

- Location within Buenos Aires Province
- Coordinates: 35°18′S 58°36′W
- Country: Argentina
- Province: Buenos Aires
- Partidos: Cañuelas
- Established: September 18, 1911
- Elevation: 26 m (85 ft)

Population (2001 Census)
  - Total: 277
- Time zone: UTC−3 (ART)
- CPA Base: B 7221
- Climate: Dfc

Gobernador Udaondo is a town located in the Cañuelas Partido in the province of Buenos Aires, Argentina.

== History ==
Gobernador Udaondo was founded on September 18, 1911. The town had railway service which served the area until the 1960s. The tracks serving the station were removed in 1978.

== Population ==
According to INDEC, which collects population data for the country, the town had a population of 277 people as of the 2001 census.
