= Pilar Campoy =

Argentine field hockey player

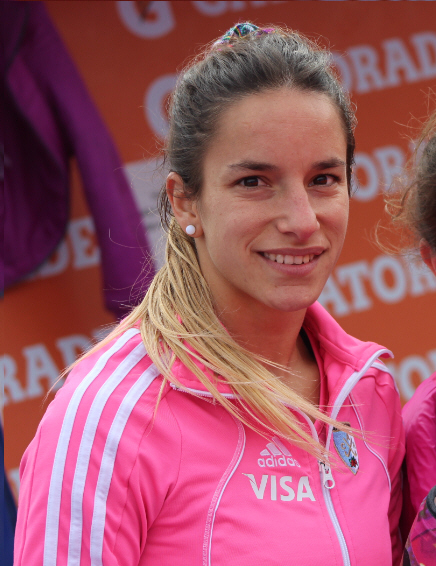
- Campoy in 2016

Personal information
- Full name: María Pilar Campoy
- Born: 6 October 1990 (age 35) Vicente López, Argentina
- Height: 1.58 m (5 ft 2 in)

Sport
- Sport: Field hockey
- Position: Midfielder
- Club: Sanse Complutense
Youth career
- Team
- –: Banco Nación
Senior career
Years	Team	Caps	Goals
–2013	Banco Nación	-	-
2013–2015	Club Náutico Hacoaj	-	-
2015	UD Taburiente	-	-
2015–2016	Club Náutico Hacoaj	-	-
2016	SPV Complutense	-	-
2017–2019	Club Náutico Hacoaj	-	-
2019–2020	Real Sociedad	-	-
2020–2021	Club de Campo	-	-
2021–Present	Sanse Complutense	-	-
National team
Years	Team	Caps	Goals
–	Argentina	64	-
Medal record
Olympic Games
Bronze medal – third place	2024 Paris	Team
Hockey World League
Gold medal – first place	2014–15 Rosario
Champions Trophy
Gold medal – first place	2016 London
Pan American Games
Gold medal – first place	2023 Santiago	Team
Pan American Cup
Gold medal – first place	2017 Lancaster
South American Games
Gold medal – first place	2018 Cochabamba	Team

María Pilar Campoy (born 6 October 1990) is an Argentine field hockey player and part of the Argentina national team.

She was part of the Argentine team at the 2014–15 Women's FIH Hockey World League where she won a gold medal, and at the 2016 Summer Olympics in Rio de Janeiro. On club level she played for Club Náutico Hacoaj in Argentina.
