= Campus Universidad del Salvador =

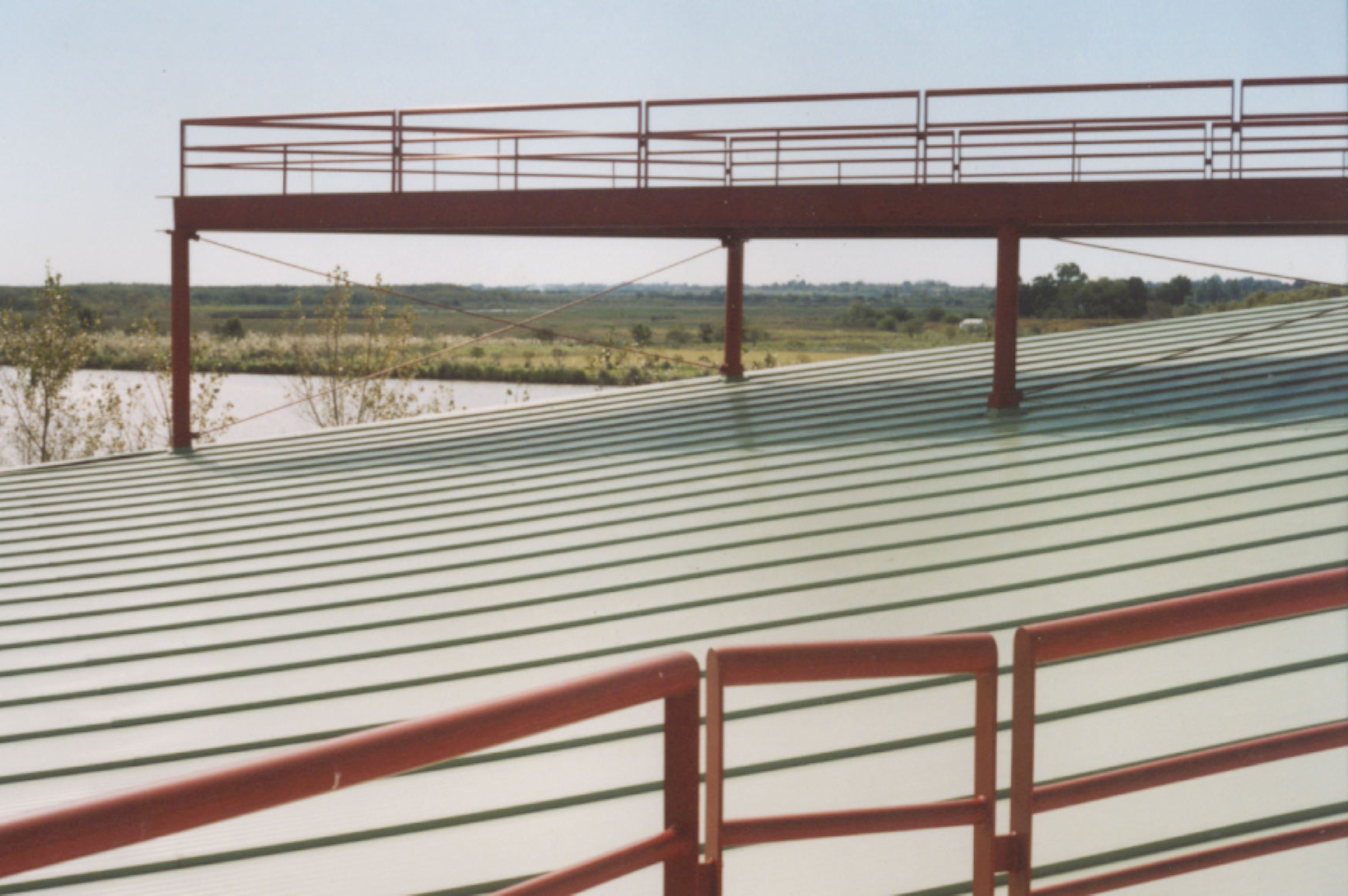

General information
- Type: House
- Location: Pilar, Buenos Aires
- Construction started: 2002

Design and construction
- Architect: Clorindo Testa

Campus Universidad del Salvador is an architectural project created by Clorindo Testa for the Universidad del Salvador in Pilar, Buenos Aires. It comprises an auditorium and a library. The auditorium has capacity for 600 people and was designed not only for academic functions but for other types of cultural uses. It is designed in the shape of a large mound in the manner of an ancient Egyptian tomb.
