= Barrancas Fútbol Club =

Barrancas
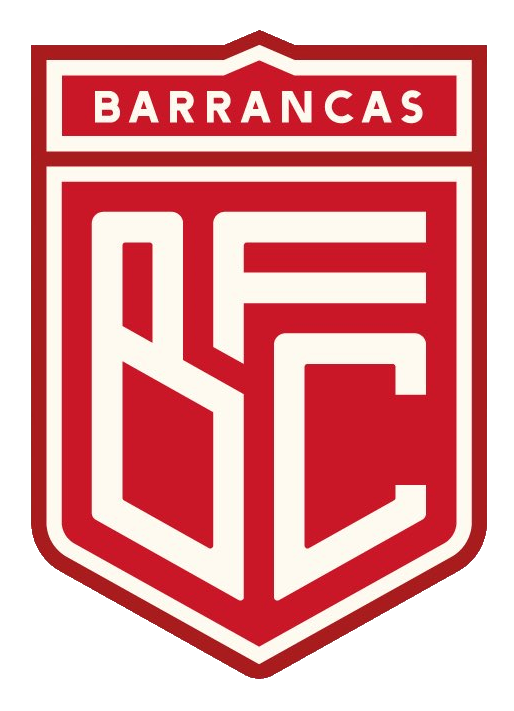
- Full name: Barrancas UMET Fútbol Club
- Nickname: Elefante (Elephant)
- Founded: August 16, 2023; 3 years ago
- Ground: (none)
- League: Torneo Promocional Amateur
- 2024: 11°
Home colours	Away colours

Barrancas Fútbol Club, also known as Barrancas UMET, is an Argentine football club located in the city of Buenos Aires. Established in 2023, it currently competes in Torneo Promocional Amateur, the fifth division of the Argentine football league system. To date, Barrancas is the younger football team to play in official competitions.

The team has similar objectives than universities and colleges in the United States so Barrancas's players can access to student financial aids for the University of Belgrano.

== History ==
The club was established in August 2023 in the Belgrano neighborhood of Buenos Aires after an initiative from a group of students of the University of Belgrano, a private study house. They had proposed that the university's football team (which competed in the College Amateur Sports Association) could participate in competitions organised by the Argentine Football Association.

Thus when AFA dissolved the Primera D Metropolitana and created Torneo Promocional Amateur, Barrancas UMET was invited by the association to be part of the recently created league. Barrancas UMET's first official match was on 27 February 2024 vs Juventud de Bernal. It ended in a 1–1 tie.

In September 2026, under manager Néstor "Colo" Moramarco, Barrancas UMET achieved promotion to Primera C Metropolitana for the first time in its history. After topping Zone B during the regular phase with nine wins, four draws, and three defeats, the team reached the final against SAT. Barrancas won the championship tie 3–0 on aggregate, following a 2–0 victory in the first leg and a 1–0 win in the second leg with a goal from Luca Luna, earning the first promotion of the 2026 Argentine football season.

== Related cases ==
The closest antecedent about strong bonds between a university and a football team is the merger of Universidad Abierta Interamericana (UAI) and Club Deportivo Social y Cultural Ferrocarril Urquiza, which joined forces to form UAI Urquiza in 2009. At the moment of the merger, Ferrocarril Urquiza was in the last position of Primera D and close to be disaffiliated. Since then, UAI Urquiza has managed to rise to the Primera B Metropolitana. In addition, became one of the strongest women's football teams in Argentina, having won five titles to date.

== Football in Belgrano ==
The neighborhood of Belgrano has a long tradition of being the home of notable football clubs such as legendary Alumni or Belgrano Athletic, which not only played in the top division of Argentina –Primera División– but also won several national and international championships in the origins of football in Argentina.

C.A. River Plate and its home venue Estadio Monumental (which have been wrongly associated with neighbour district Núñez) are also located in the Belgrano neighborhood.
