= Club Náutico Hacoaj =

Argentine sports club

Hacoaj
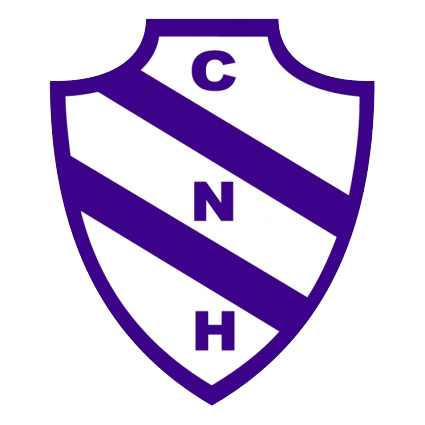
- Full name: Club Náutico Hacoaj
- Founded: 24 December 1935; 90 years ago
- Location: Tigre, Argentina
- Activities: List: Football; Artistic gymnastics; Cestoball; Field hockey; Golf; Judo; Paddle tennis; Swimming; Rowing; Tennis; Volleyball; Aquagym; Basketball; Boxing; Gymnastics; Squash; Yoga
- President: Osvaldo Ofman
- Colors: (White, Blue)
- Website: hacoaj.org.ar

Club Náutico Hacoaj is an Argentine sports club headquartered in the Tigre district of Greater Buenos Aires. Although the institution was founded as a rowing club, Hacoaj hosts a wide range of activities, including basketball, field hockey, football, golf, tennis, and volleyball, among others.

Founded in 1935, the club is considered one of the most important institutions of the Jewish community in Argentina. The club has more than 10,000 members.

Since 2024, Hacoaj's football team plays in Torneo Promocional Amateur, the fifth level of the Argentine football system.

== History ==
Playing kit

Large numbers of Jews first came to Argentina in the middle of the 19th century. Those were the times when Argentina encouraged immigration from Europe. The first Jews arrived from Russia, Poland, The Austro-Hungarian Empire and Germany, while other Jewish people came from the Ottoman Empire. Those groups established their homes mainly in the rural areas of Buenos Aires, Entre Ríos, and Santa Fe, where they worked as tenant farmers.

During the decades of the 1920s and 1930s a second immigrant group arrived to Argentina, where they developed their professional careers in the biggest cities of the country, working as teachers, journalists, actors, and politicians. The districts where the most Jews established were Villa Crespo, Balvanera, Flores, Barracas, La Boca, and suburban areas. As they usually did, Jewish people organized their social activities founding their own institutions such as temples, cemeteries, hospitals, committees, and clubs.

Mauricio Schverlij, a young Jewish engineer, had asked to be admitted as a member of a rowing club of Tigre Partido, but his request was rejected. Suspecting that the rejection was due to his Jewish origin, Schverlij called his own relatives and friends with the purpose of creating a rowing club that represented the Jewish community. On the night of 24 December 1935, a meeting was held, establishing the "Club Náutico Israelita" ("Israelite Rowing Club", in Spanish). The word "Náutico" (Nautical) was to underline its rowing activities, as at that time it was the first club where Jews could practice that sport. One year later the club changed its name to "Club Náutico Hacoaj" in honor of its namesake, Hakoah (in Vienna, Austria), later destroyed by the Nazis in 1938 (coah/coaj/כּוֹחַ means power in Hebrew). Hacoaj started in a small rented place in Tigre, with a mooring, a few boats, tennis courts, basketball, bocce, football, a colonial-style main building, dormitories and a wooden dance floor.

== Facilities ==
Club facilities are detailed below:

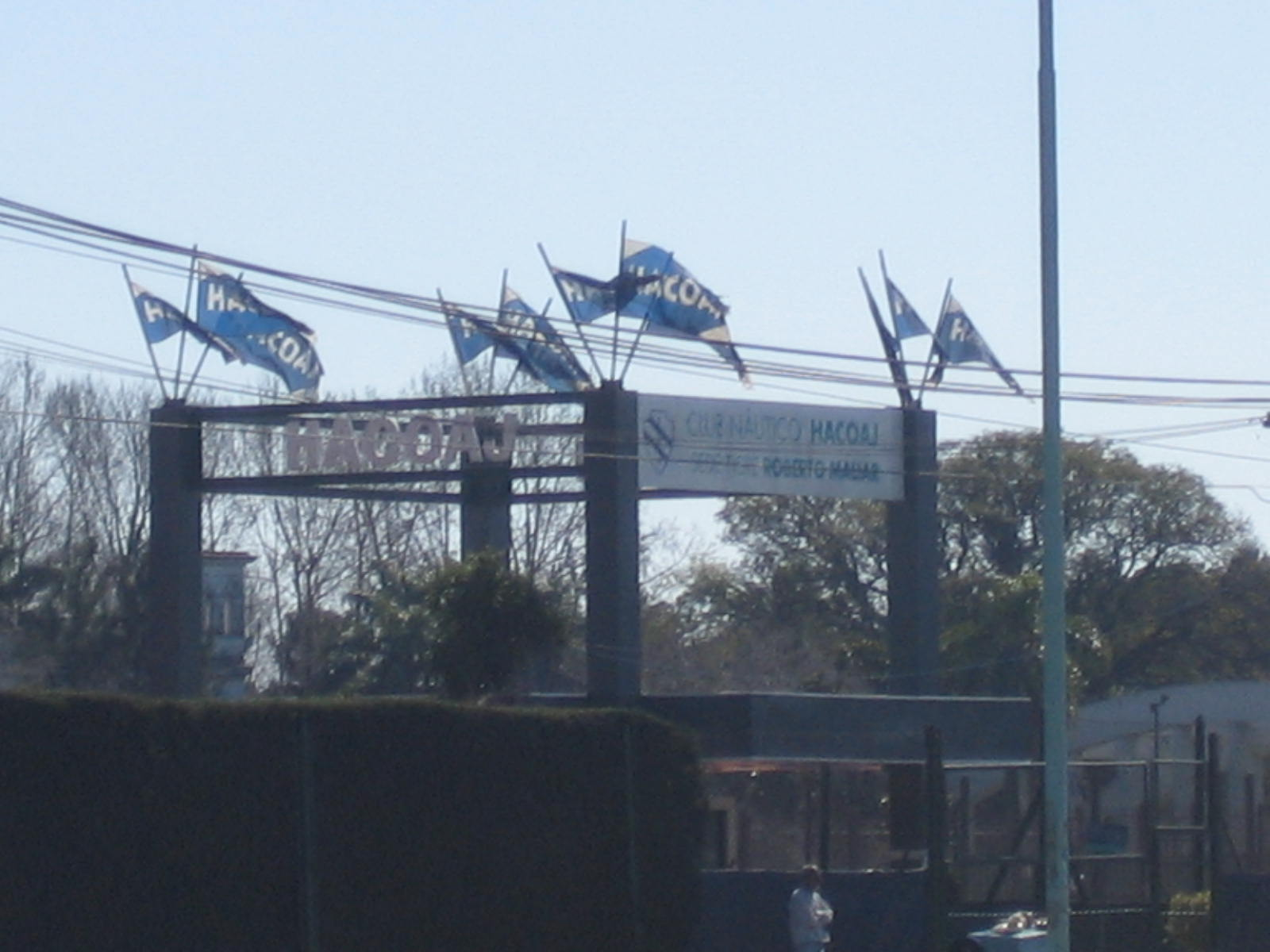
Sede Tigre Maliar hosts the largest amount of sports and activities of Hacoaj

Facility	Location	Sport(s) and activities	Notes	Ref.
Tigre Maliar	Tigre	Football, tennis, paddle, hockey, swimming, volleyball, judo	The original location and largest facility. It was named after a longtime president of the club, Roberto Maliar	
Club de Campo	Rincón de Milberg	Football, futsal, golf, tennis, paddle, basketball	Country club located near the "Sede Tigre"	
Marinas H	Rincón de Milberg	Paddle, swimming		
Ben Gurión	Buenos Aires	Artistic gymnastics, judo		
Isla Hacoaj	Paraná Delta	Recreational	An island that can be reached rowing from the Tigre Location	

Club facilities include three football pitches, two field hockey pitches, three indoor stadiums, an artistic gymnastics venue, six paddle tennis courts, and swimming pools.

== Sports ==
As of March 2026, sports and activities practised at the club include:

=== Competitive ===
- Football (Note: Affiliated to Argentine Football Association.)
- Artistic gymnastics
- Cestoball
- Field hockey (Note: Affiliated to Buenos Aires Hockey Association.)
- Golf
- Judo
- Paddle tennis
- Swimming
- Rowing
- Tennis
- Volleyball

=== Recreational ===
- Aquagym
- Basketball
- Boxing
- Gymnastics
- Squash
- Yoga

=== Tennis ===
As of 2026, Hacoaj has 850 active players, with 250 children attending the tennis school, and 50 in competitive tournaments. The club has also three tennis academies. In 2022, Hacoaj hosted an international tennis tournament for the first time, the ATP Challenger 50. In 2026, the club will host the "AAT Challenger IEB+ edición Tigre I y II". The main tennis court is named after Diego Schwartzman, the most renowned player of the club who won four ATP tour titles and was ranked among the 10 top players in the world.

== Notable members ==
- Daniel Brailovsky (football), who played for Argentina and Israel national teams.
- Diego Schwartzman (tennis), reached 2017 and 2019 U.S. Open QF and 2018 QF and 2020 SF at Roland Garros.
- Giselle Kañevsky (hockey), player of Argentina national team
- Pilar Campoy (hockey), player of Argentina national team
- Mariné Russo (hockey), player of Argentina national team
