= Pilar Partido =

Pilar Partido del Pilar
- Department
- Flag Coat of arms

- location of Pilar Partido in Gran Buenos Aires
- Coordinates: 34°28′S 58°55′W
- Country: Argentina
- Established: 1864
- Founder: Juan de Garay
- Seat: Pilar

Government
  - Intendant: Federico Achával (PJ-UP)

Area
  - Total: 352 km^{2} (136 sq mi)

Population
  - Total: 394,754 hab.
  - Density: 1,120/km^{2} (2,900/sq mi)
- Demonym: pilarense
- Postal Code: B1629
- IFAM: BUE096
- Area Code: 02322
- Patron saint: Virgen del Pilar
- Website: www.pilar.gov.ar

Pilar Partido is a partido in the northern part of Greater Buenos Aires in Buenos Aires Province, Argentina.

The provincial subdivision has a population of about 232,000 inhabitants in an area of 352 km^{2} (136 sq mi), and its capital city is Pilar, which is around 45 km (28 mi) from Buenos Aires.

It has universities and schools.

== Settlements ==
- Pilar
- Del Viso
- Presidente Derqui
- Fátima
- La Lonja
- Manuel Alberti
- Manzanares
- Villa Rosa
- Villa Astolfi
- Zelaya.

== Gallery ==
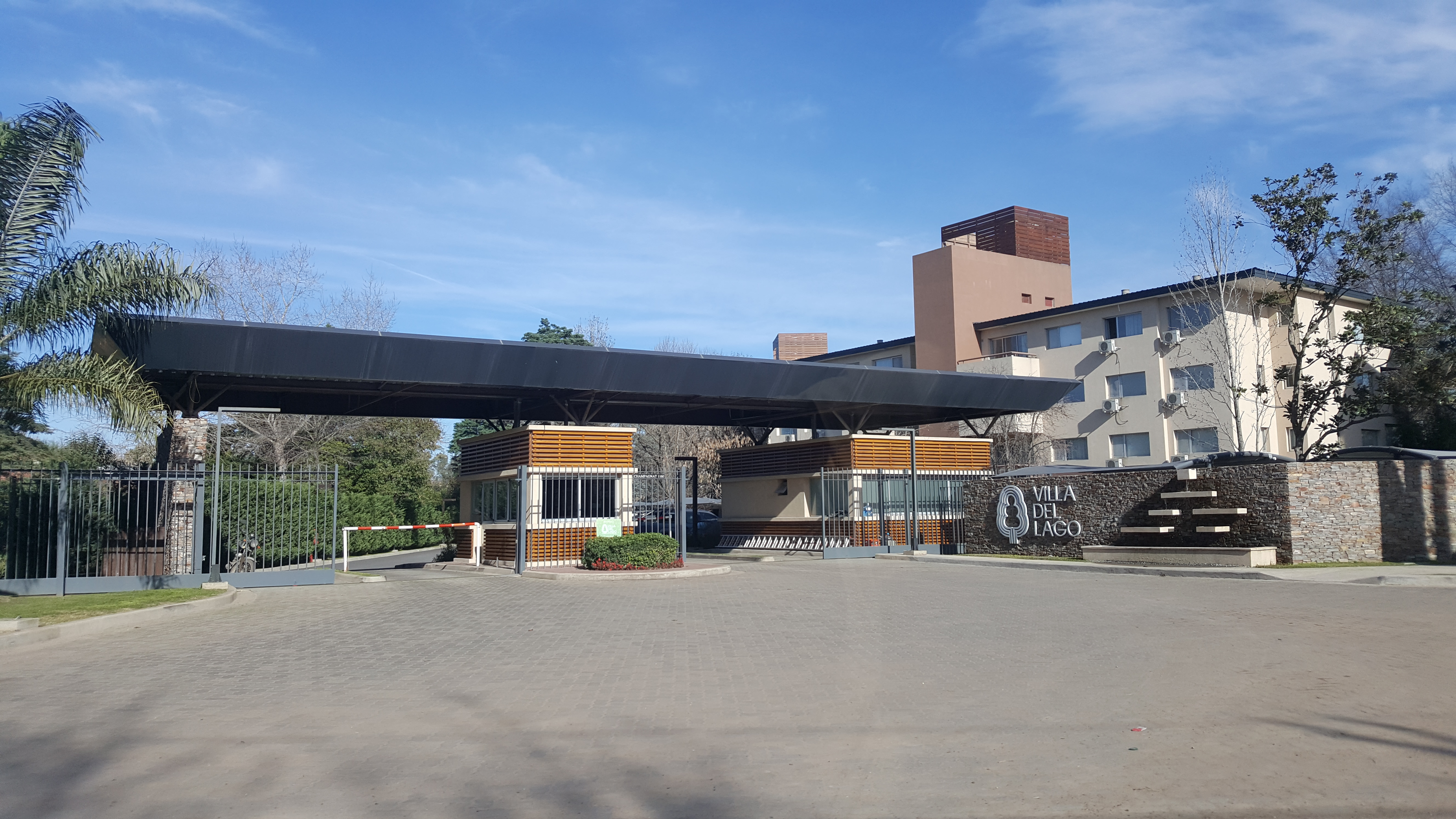
Gated neighborhoods are common in Pilar
