= Cañuelas Partido =

Cañuelas Partido de Cañuelas
- Department
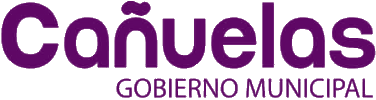

- Cañuelas Partido in Buenos Aires Province
- Coordinates: 35°03′S 58°46′W
- Country: Argentina
- Seat: Cañuelas

Government
  - Intendant: Marisa Fassi (Homeland Force)

Area
  - Total: 1,200 km^{2} (460 sq mi)

Population
  - Total: 42,575
  - Density: 35/km^{2} (92/sq mi)
- Demonym: cañuelense
- Postal Code: B1814
- IFAM: BUE018
- Area Code: 02226
- Website: canuelas.gov.ar

Cañuelas Partido is a partido of Buenos Aires Province in Argentina. It has a population of 42,575 in an area of 1,200 km^{2} (460 sq mi), and its administrative centre is Cañuelas, which has a population of around 24,380.

== Sports ==
Cañuelas is home to Cañuelas FC, a football club currently playing in the regional 4th Division of Argentine football.

== Towns ==
- Cañuelas district capital: 24,483 inhabitants
- Alejandro Petión: 2,874 inhabitants
- Barrio El Taladro: 134 inhabitants
- Gobernador Udaondo: 277 inhabitants
- La Noria
- Máximo Paz
- Petion
- Santa Rosa: 3,771 inhabitants
- Uribelarrea: 1,147 inhabitants
- Vicente Casares: 629 inhabitants
