= Vicente Casares =

- Location in Argentina
- Coordinates: 34°58′S 58°39′W
- Country: Argentina
- Province: Buenos Aires
- Partido: Cañuelas
- Elevation: 19 m (62 ft)

Population (2001 census [INDEC])
  - Total: 692
- CPA Base: B 1808
- Area code: +54 291

Vicente Casares is a town in the Cañuelas Partido of Buenos Aires Province in Argentina.
