= Uribelarrea =

- Town
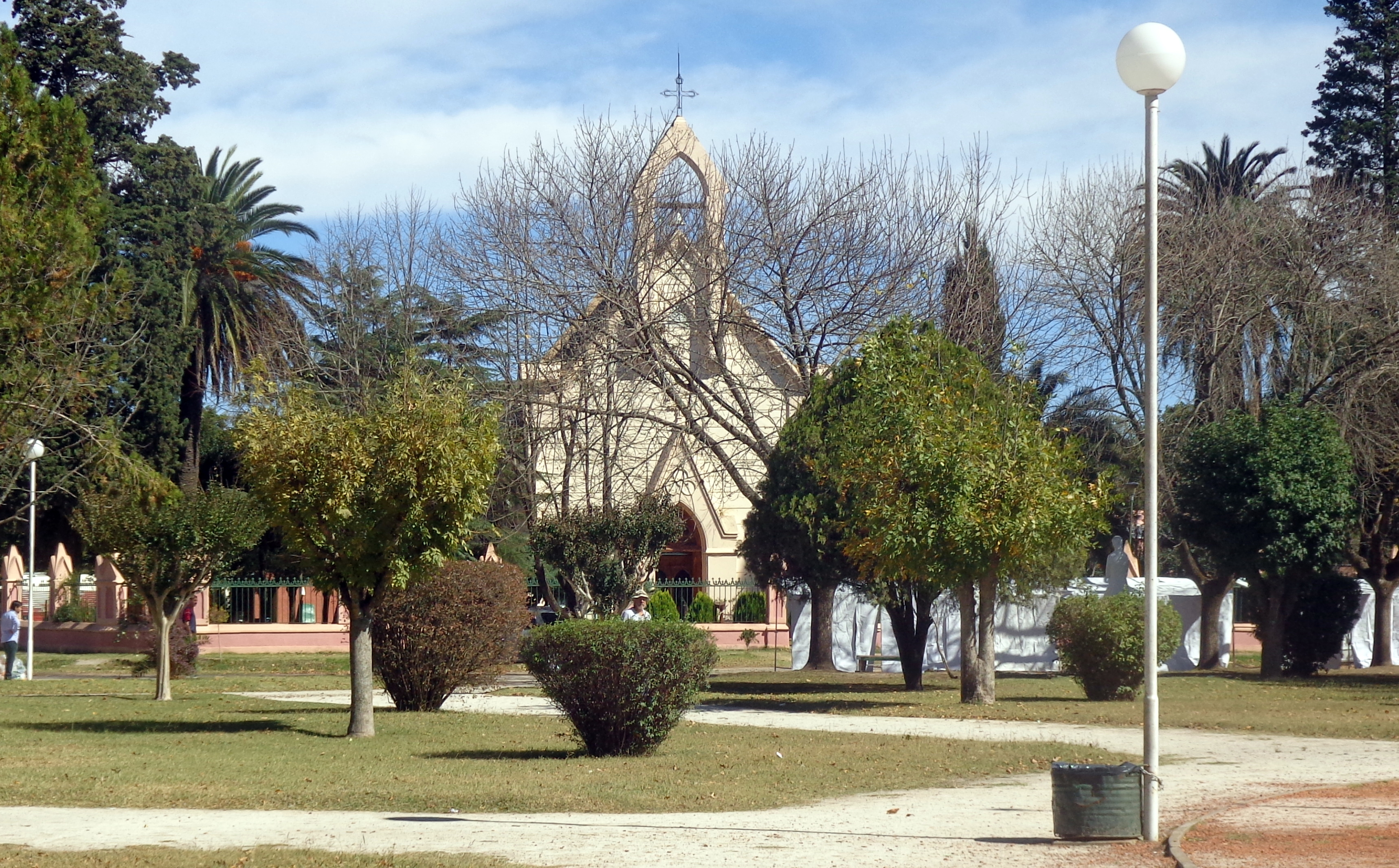
- Town square with church in the background

- Location within Buenos Aires Province
- Coordinates: 35°07′S 58°53′W
- Country: Argentina
- Province: Buenos Aires
- Partidos: Cañuelas
- Elevation: 25 m (82 ft)

Population (2001 Census)
  - Total: 1,147
- Time zone: UTC−3 (ART)
- CPA Base: B 1815
- Climate: Dfc

Uribelarrea is a town located in the Cañuelas Partido in the province of Buenos Aires in Argentina.

== Geography ==
Uribelarrea is located around 88 km (55 mi) from the city of Buenos Aires.

== History ==
Uribelarrea was founded in 1890, after a rancher sold land he owned in the region to create an agricultural community. The layout of the town began two years earlier in 1888. A church, named Our Lady of Luján was established the year of the town's founding. A train station was constructed in 1892. The town became a center for the dairy industry, especially during the 1930s and 1940s. Uribelarrea was primarily settled by immigrants of Basque and Italian origin.

== Population ==
According to INDEC, which collects population data for the country, the town had a population of 1,147 people as of the 2001 census.

== In popular culture ==
The 1973 film Juan Moreira and the 1996 film Evita were filmed in the town.
