= Cañuelas, Buenos Aires =

Cañuelas
- Location in Argentina
- Coordinates: 35°02′S 58°44′W
- Country: Argentina
- Province: Buenos Aires
- Partido: Cañuelas
- Elevation: 28 m (92 ft)

Population (2012)
  - Total: 31,901
- CPA Base: B 1814
- Area code: +54 2226
- Website: Official website

Cañuelas is a town in Buenos Aires Province, Argentina. It is the administrative centre for Cañuelas Partido. It is located near the outskirts of the Greater Buenos Aires conurbation.

It is claimed that dulce de leche was invented by the dairy Estancia La Caledonia near Cañuelas on 24 June 1829 by chance. The area was also home to the first dairy factory in Argentina at La Martona.

== Notable people ==
- Branko de Tellería (born 1991), Argentine footballer
- Felipa Larrea (1810–1910), last surviving Afro-Argentine slave (died in Cañuelas)
