= Pilar, Buenos Aires =

City in Buenos Aires Province, Argentina

Pilar
- City
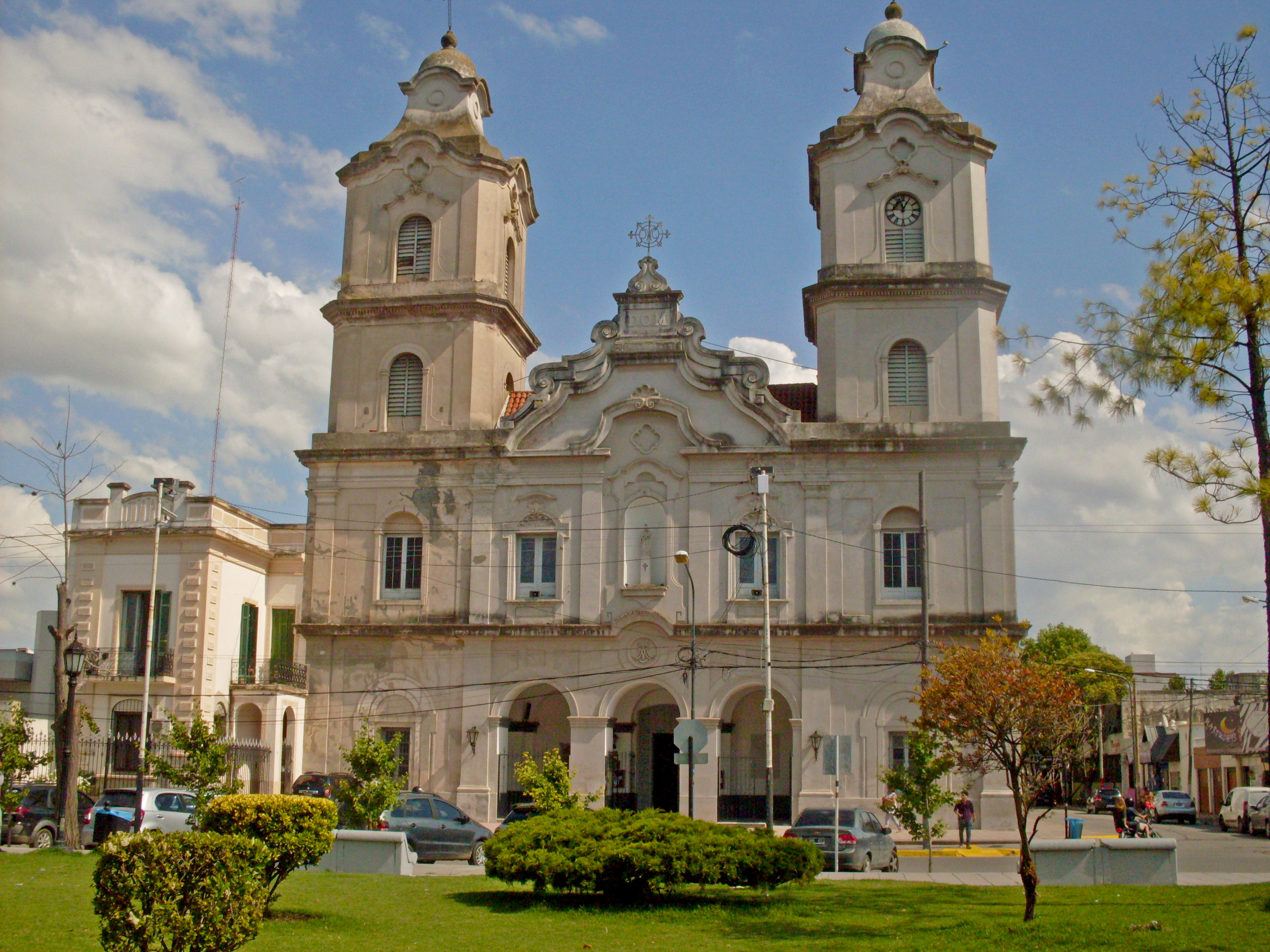
- Nuestra Señora del Pilar

- Location in Greater Buenos Aires
- Coordinates: 34°27′S 58°55′W
- Country: Argentina
- Province: Buenos Aires
- Partido: Pilar

Government
  - Intendant: Federico Achával (PJ-UP)
- Elevation: 18 m (59 ft)

Population
  - Estimate (2022): 52,000
- CPA Base: B 1629
- Area code: +54 2322

Pilar is a city in Buenos Aires Province, Argentina. It is part of the Greater Buenos Aires urban conurbation and is the seat of the administrative division of Pilar Partido. It is located about 51 km northwest of downtown Buenos Aires. As of the 2022 Census, the city had a population of nearly 52,000.

Originally located on the flood-prone banks of the Luján River, the small town of Pilar and its chapel were relocated to their current site in the 1800s. Pilar was the site of the signing of the Treaty of Pilar in 1820, a foundational document that is one of "pre-existing pacts" of the Constitution of Argentina and laid the foundation for Argentina's federal system of government.

Since the 1990s, Pilar has undergone a demographic transformation fueled by the development of gated communities within and around the city limits. In recent decades, as the administrative center of Pilar Partido, the city has diversified its economy, supported by neighbouring industries and a growing service sector in the district. As a result, Pilar has solidified its position as a development hub on the outskirts of Greater Buenos Aires.

== History ==
The rural outpost that later became Pilar was first assigned a local authority in 1774 with the appointment of Ventura López Camelo as its first alcalde, or mayor.

Pilar was originally located next to the Luján River. After frequent floods, was requested in the 1800s to relocate the small town and chapel on higher land (its current location).

Pilar is the site where the Treaty of Pilar was signed on February 23, 1820, establishing the basis for Argentine federalism, as a result of which the city of Pilar is acknowledged as the "Cradle of National Federalism." This Treaty marked the end of the war between the League of Free Peoples formed by the provinces of Entre Ríos and Santa Fe against Buenos Aires.

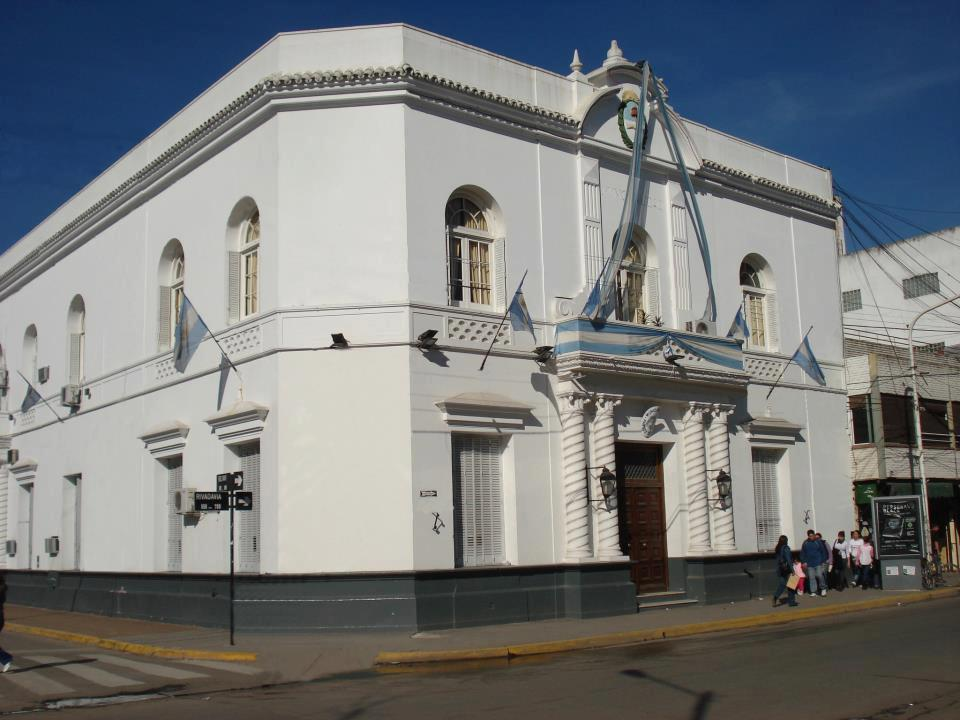
City Hall

The Parish of Our Lady of the Pillar was consecrated in 1856, and the partido (county) of Pilar was established in 1864, its first municipal mayor being Tomás Márquez.

A Buenos Aires and Pacific Railway line, its first, reached the town in 1886, and by 1895 nearly 10,000 inhabitants lived in Pilar. The opening of National Route 8 in 1934 eased the 58 kilometres (36 mi) commute to Buenos Aires, and Pilar subsequently became a growing commuter town.

Pilar grew further after the construction in the late 1960s of a freeway along the stretch of National Route 8 to Buenos Aires, and with the establishment in 1970 of the local industrial district, the Parque Industrial Pilar, which grew to be among the largest in South America and home to 200 national and international companies.

The establishment of the first polo fields beginning in the late 19th century and of a number of country clubs from 1948 onward, as well as the development of numerous gated communities beginning in the 1990s, gave Pilar an increasingly upscale profile in subsequent years.

In 2017, the municipality created the locality of Pilar Sur, out of the southern portion of the city.

== Attractions ==
Numerous visitor and tourist attractions are located in the city. These include the Parish of Our Lady of the Pillar (1856); the October 12 Plaza facing it (both National Historic Monuments); the Spanish Colonial Revivalist City Hall (1896); the Alcalde Lorenzo López Historical Museum; the (reputedly haunted) Pando-Carabassa Chalet (1900), the Argentine Polo Association therein, and the adjoining polo fields; several country clubs including the Highland Park Country Club (1948), Golfer's Country Club (1973), Pilar Golf Club (1992), and the Estancias Golf Club (2008); and the Pilar Nature Reserve (2003). Pilar is also the site of the private Austral University, founded in 1991.

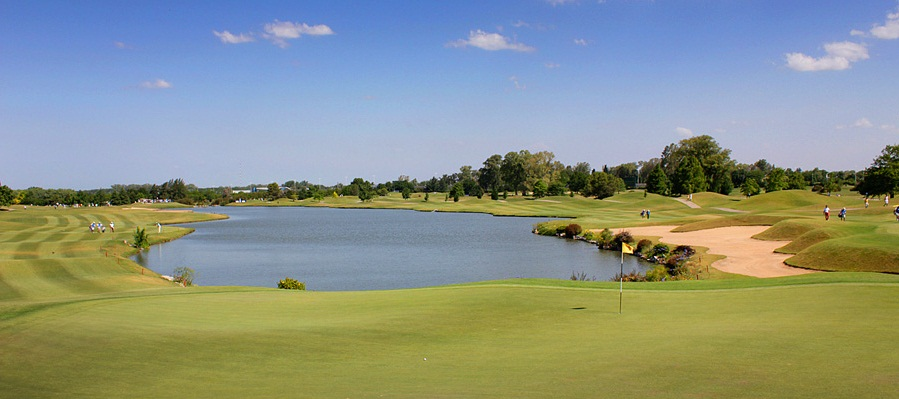
Partial view of the Pilar Golf course.

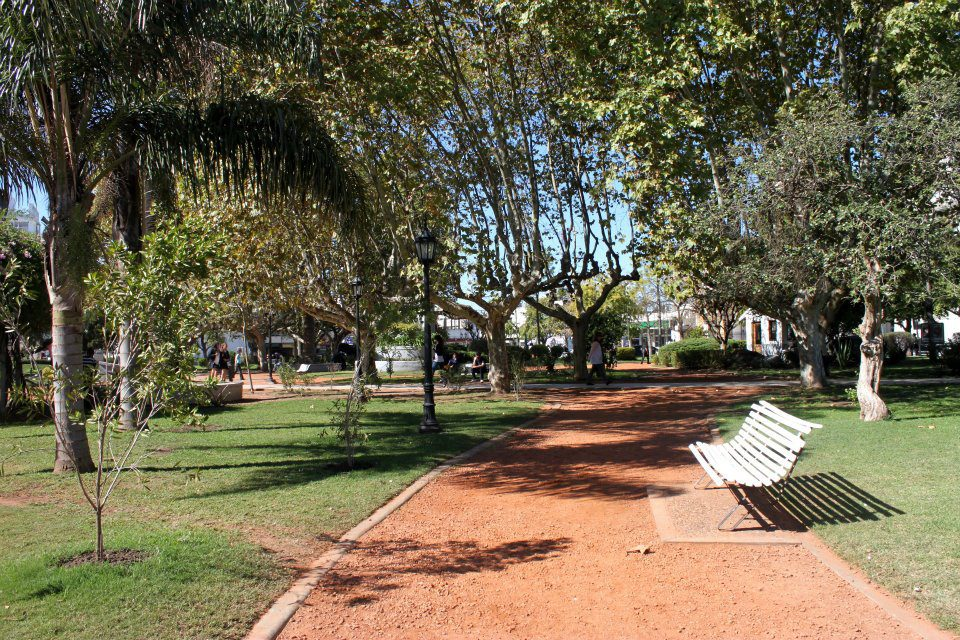
October 12 Square

== The celebrations of the pilar ==
Signing of the Treaty of Pilar. It is celebrated on February 23, the anniversary of the peace agreement signed by Manuel de Sarratea, Governor of Buenos Aires; Estanislao López, Governor of Santa Fe; and Francisco Ramírez, governor of Entre Ríos. The treaty, signed in 1820, laid the foundation of the federal system of government today prevailing in Argentina. Pilar recalls the historic pact with protocol events, conferences and art festivals, among other activities.

Our Lady of the Pillar. Each October 12, the community of Pilar and the whole Party celebrated the feast of their patron saint, the Virgin of Pilar. He remembers when, in 1729, a local indigenous man exposed to public worship an image of the Virgin in a chapel erected on his property. In addition to the liturgical activities, including the huge procession with the venerated image stands out, the Municipality of Pilar organized a civic-military parade that the forces of the district, educational, social and sporting institutions, traditionalist centers and schools involved native dances, among other social organizations.

== Tourism ==
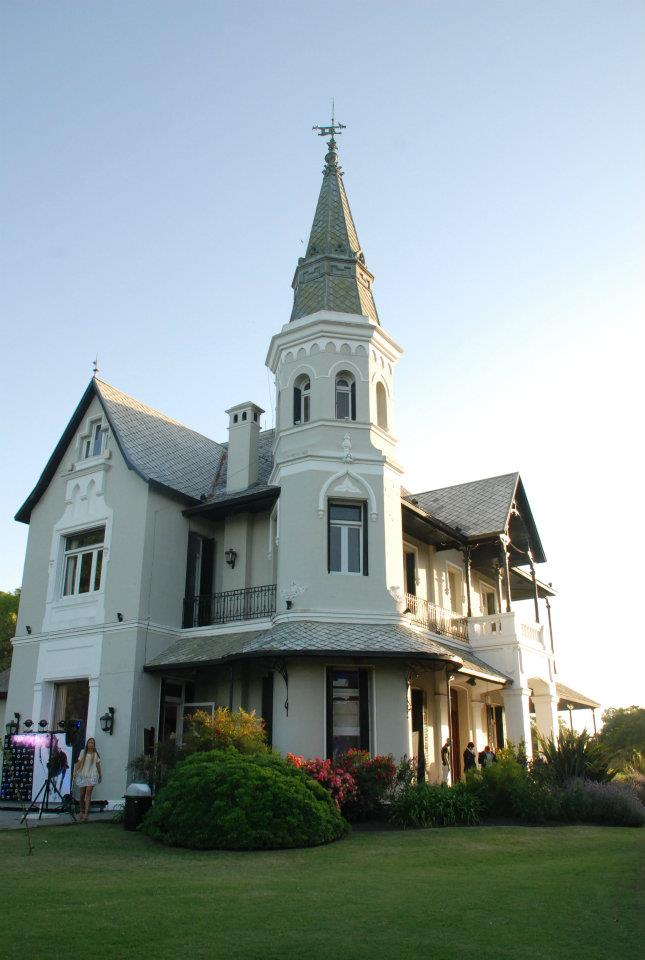
The Pando-Carabassa House, headquarters of the Argentine Polo Association.

Some notable points of interest in Pilar are:

October 12 Square. Declared a National Historic Landmark on May 21, 1942. The city has an urban design around a rectangular plaza which in turn gives rise to the trace the streets and a grid amanzanamiento. The square is graced Ginkgo biloba, planted between 1958 and 1962.

Treaty of Pilar. Signed here on February 23, 1820, it marked the origin of the federal system of government and made the city the "cradle of federalism" in Argentina. The pact, signed in the original chapel of Pilar by Francisco Ramírez, Estanislao López, and Manuel de Sarratea, ended the war between the provinces of Entre Ríos and Santa Fe against Buenos Aires.

Municipal Palace. Is cornerstone was laid in 1896 by the Governor of the Province, Guillermo Udaondo. The first Municipal Mayor was Thomas Márquez. The building originally housed four dungeons.

Our Lady of the Pilar. Begun as a simple adobe structure in 1821 under the direction of architect José Villa, the vault of the nave and the upper floors were made from 1840. The work was then interrupted until 1854 and continued until its conclusion directed by architect Roque Petrocchi. It was declared a National Historic Landmark on December 7, 1994.

Mayor Lorenzo López Historical Museum. The Museum preserves and exhibits historical and religious artifacts from Pilar. Of particular interest is the display of objects linked with the signing of the Treaty of Pilar.

Cross of Pilar. Located on the corner of the intersection of Pedro Lagrave and Paraná streets, it's believed to have been placed in 1790 by Spanish missionaries traveling north from Buenos Aires; another version has it that this cross was placed as a guidepost when the original settlement was moved to its current location. The first mass in Pilar was held here, and with the advent of bricks as building material in the 19th century, the old wooden cross was replaced by masonry.

The Site of the Miracle. The site, known originally as Rosendo's Post, where the miracle of the Virgin of Luján reportedly took place in 1630. There are two milestones that make reference to the miracle: a small altar with the image of the Virgin of Luján; and an old adobe chapel. The Ministry of Culture of the Nation declared this a National Historic Landmark.

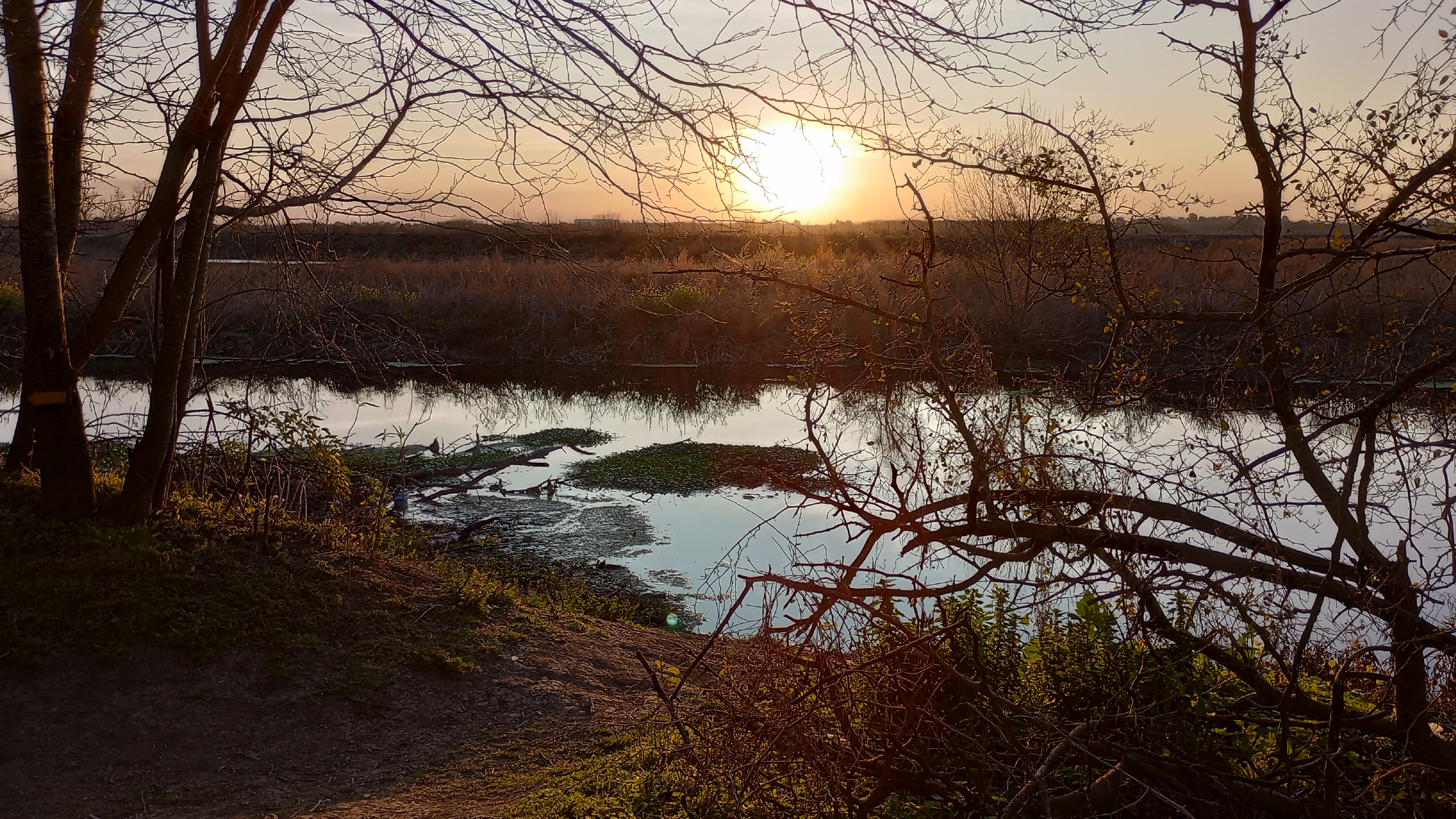
Luján River from Pilar Nature Reserve.

Pilar Nature Reserve. Established on 20 August 2003, the reserve made use of five former military lots bordering the north bank of the Luján River and totals 297 hectares (730 acres). A series of lagoons make it home to a profusion of roman cassie, Jerusalem thorn, tule, catay, waxyleaf nightshade and other flora, as well weasels, rabbits, nutria, skunks, amphibians, reptiles, and over 60 species of birds.

Polo and golf. Pilar is known in Argentina as the National Capital of Polo. The Argentina Polo Association is headquartered in Pando-Carabassa Castle, built in the late nineteenth century. The site has nine fields and is home to the most important tournaments in the country.

== Economy and real estate development ==
Pilar's economy rests on services, industry and residential construction. Since the 1990s, the city and its surrounding district have been a focal point of private suburban development in Greater Buenos Aires, driven by the expansion of gated communities, country clubs and housing projects along the northern corridor. The Pilar Industrial Park is one of the largest industrial districts in South America and has reinforced local employment and residential demand. As of 2026, Pilar remains an active market for residential construction and private-neighbourhood projects.

== Demographics ==
Pilar is the third most populous locality of Pilar Partido.

== Notable people ==
- Belén Rodríguez, television personality and model
- Franco Colapinto, racing driver
- Valentina Zenere, actress
