= Llamil Reston =

Argentinian politician and military general (1926–2019)

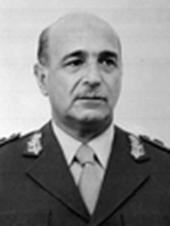

Minister of the Interior
- In office 2 July 1982 – 10 December 1983
- Preceded by: Alfredo Oscar Saint Jean
- Succeeded by: Antonio Tróccoli

Chief of the Joint Chiefs of Staff of the Armed Forces of the Argentine Republic
- In office 30 March 1981 – 10 December 1981
- Preceded by: Horacio Tomás Liendo
- Succeeded by: Leopoldo Suárez del Cerro

Minister of Labor
- In office 8 February 1979 – 29 March 1981
- Preceded by: Horacio Tomás Liendo
- Succeeded by: Julio Porcile

Personal details
- Born: 20 May 1926 Santiago del Estero Province, Argentina
- Died: 27 December 2019 (aged 93) Buenos Aires, Argentina

Military service
- Allegiance: Argentina
- Branch/service: Argentine Army
- Years of service: 1944-1983
- Rank: (Pre-1991 epaulette) Division General

Llamil Reston (20 May 1926 – 27 December 2019) was an Argentine General who during the National Reorganization Process served as Minister of Labour designated by Jorge Rafael Videla between January 1976 to March 1981, Minister of Interior designated by Reynaldo Bignone between July 1981 and December 1983. and the Chief of the Joint Chiefs of Staff of the Armed Forces of the Argentine Republic between March 1981 and December 1981.

He was born in Santiago del Estero city, into a family of Syrian-Lebanese origins. He graduated as Army officer from the Colegio Militar de la Nación in 1944.

He was accused of crimes against humanity, but never convicted. He died in Buenos Aires at the age of 93 years.
