= Posadas Hospital Trial =

Trials for crimes against humanity occurred in the Posadas Hospital

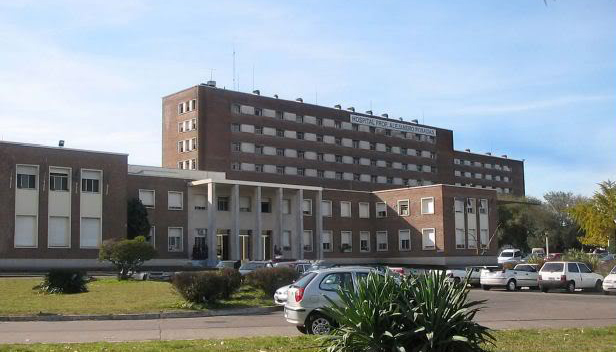
- Posadas Hospital facade.
- Court: Federal Criminal Oral Court No. 2 of the Autonomous City of Buenos Aires
- Full case name: BIGNONE, Reynaldo Benito Antonio and others s/ inf. art. 144 bis paragraph 1 and last paragraph –law 14.616–, 142 paragraph 1 and 5 –law 20.642 and 144 ter first paragraph –law 14.616–, 142 paragraph 1 and 5 –law 20.642 and 144 ter first paragraph –law 14.616–.
- Decided: February 3, 2012

Keywords
- Crimes against humanity

The Posadas Hospital Trial (Spanish: Juicio Hospital Posadas) is the name given to the court case for crimes against humanity committed in the clandestine detention center (Argentina) called "El Chalet", located inside the Posadas Hospital, during the military dictatorship called the National Reorganization Process.

The first trial took place between August and November 2011. In this period, the only defendants who reached the sentence, Hipólito Mariani, Luis Muiña and Reynaldo Bignone, were convicted and finally sentenced for the kidnapping, torture and disappearance of hospital workers. Others who were denounced for the act were found incompetent or died before the sentence was passed.

The second trial for crimes against humanity committed there began on April 18, 2018, with two defendants: Luis Muiña (convicted for the events listed in Section I) and Argentino Ríos (tried for the events listed in Section I and II).

== Hearings ==
The case was brought to trial in 2008 by federal judge Daniel Rafecas, who was in charge of the large case of the First Army Corps (among which were the Atlético, Banco y Olimpo (ABO) case, the ABO bis case and the Automotores Orletti case).

The trial hearings were scheduled to begin on August 10, 2011, before the Federal Oral Court No. 2 of the Federal Capital, composed of Judges Pablo Daniel Bertuzzi, Rodrigo Giménez Uriburu and Jorge Luciano Gorini, but the date was postponed "due to issues inherent to the court." A month later, the start was rescheduled again, and the hearings finally began on October 20, 2011.

Floor plan of "El Chalet".

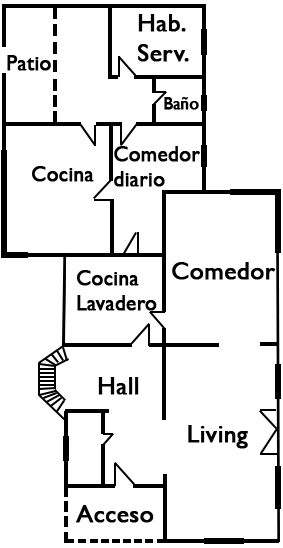
First floor

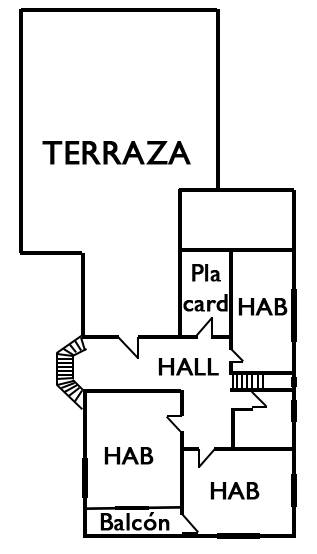
Top Floor

== Events judged ==
On March 28, 1976, four days after the coup d'état, the "Hospital Posadas" was occupied by Army forces under General Reynaldo Benito Antonio Bignone. As part of this occupation, several members of the hospital were illegally detained and subsequently dismissed for being "linked to subversive or dissociative activities", no further proof than this statement was needed, due to a decree law (Expendability Law 21,260) issued on the same day of the military coup.

On April 13, 1976, Colonel Julio Ricardo Esteves was appointed as interventor of the hospital and remained in office until March 8, 1977. Esteves, during 1976, encouraged the arrival of a group of men to whom he assigned the functions of "security guards". They formed a group they called "Swat", formally appointed to guard the hospital and ensure the integrity and property of its employees and the professionals who worked there, but which in reality was dedicated to other functions related to the alleged "anti-subversive struggle". In fact, a report made by the Batallón de Inteligencia 601 of the Argentine Army assumed "that there was a health post at the hospital dedicated to the care of subversive elements".

One of the two chalets on the hospital grounds was converted into a clandestine detention center after the hospital's director until 1976, Julio C. Rodríguez Otero, was illegally detained and tortured and his family forced to leave the hospital. Beginning in November 1976, the "Swat Group" used this chalet to kidnap and torture at least seven cases, which was proven during the course of the trial.

On January 11, 1977, Air Force personnel carried out an operation to disband the Swat group, which culminated in the arrest of its members.

== Charged ==
- Hipólito Mariani, Major Brigadier (RE) of the Argentine Air Force, head of the military area in charge of the hospital as of June 1977, awaited trial under house arrest. At that time, Mariani had already been sentenced to 8 years in prison for his actions in the clandestine detention center "Mansión Seré".
- Luis Muiña, a civilian belonging to the so-called "Swat Group", awaited trial in detention at the Marcos Paz Complex II of the Federal Penitentiary Service.
- Reynaldo Benito Antonio Bignone, Major General (RE) of the Argentine Army, awaited trial in detention under house arrest. Bignone had two convictions at the time of the trial: the first in 2010, for 25 years, and a second one the following year, for which he was sentenced to life imprisonment.

Similarly, Argentino Ríos, a civilian belonging to the so-called "Swat Group", was charged and the debate in the case began with him as the accused. However, during the hearings he had a cardiac decompensation and was later removed from the trial when he underwent surgery at the Durand hospital, due to the conclusions of the Forensic Medical Corps of the National Justice. Similarly, Colonel Agatino di Benedetto, the first controller of the hospital, was exonerated for insanity. Other defendants died before the trial began, such as medical colonel Julio Esteves, the controller who created the "Swat Group" and Juan Máximo Copteleza, head of the group.

== Victims ==
Name	Position	Date of kidnapping	Place of kidnapping	Release date	Comments
Lidia Cristina Albano	Pediatric Resident	March 28, 1976	Posadas Hospital	March 28, 1976	
Carlos Juan Apezteguía	Intensive Care Doctor	March 28, 1976	Posadas Hospital	March 28, 1976	
Camilo Francisco Campos	Nephrologist Doctor of Medical Clinic and Intensive Care	March 28, 1976	At their home	March 28, 1976	
Enrique Malamud	Assistant Hospital Director	March 28, 1976	Posadas Hospital	March 28, 1976	
Ana María Mühlmann	Gynecologist Doctor	March 28, 1976	Posadas Hospital	March 30, 1976	
Marta Muñóz	Pediatric Resident	March 28, 1976	Posadas Hospital	March 28, 1976	
Juan Manuel Nava	Doctor of Medical Clinic and Intensive Care	March 28, 1976	Posadas Hospital	March 28, 1976	
Julio Rodríguez Otero	Assistant Hospital Director	March 28, 1976	Posadas Hospital	March 28, 1976	
Dora Agustín	Chief of Staff	March 29, 1976	Posadas Hospital	March 29, 1976	
Carlos Heraldo Bevilacqua	Intensive care doctor	March 29, 1976	Posadas Hospital	March 29, 1976	
Rubén Ernesto Drago	Employee	March 29, 1976	Posadas Hospital	March 29, 1976	
Davor Kvaternik	Doctor of Medical Clinic and Intensive Care	March 29, 1976	Posadas Hospital	March 29, 1976	
Daniel Manigot	Doctor of Medical Clinic	March 29, 1976	Posadas Hospital	March 29, 1976	
Hugo Nin	Head of Anesthesiology	March 29, 1976	Posadas Hospital	March 29, 1976	
Hernando Luis Sala	Doctor of Medical Clinic and Intensive Care	March 29, 1976	Posadas Hospital	March 29, 1976	
Susana Sztabzyb	Doctor of Medical Clinic and Intensive Care	March 30, 1976	Posadas Hospital	March 30, 1976	
Gladys Evarista Cuervo	Nurse	November 25, 1976	Posadas Hospital	January 22, 1977	She was detained in the clandestine detention center "El Chalet" and at the Palomar Air Base, where she was tortured.
Jacobo Chester	Doctor	November 26, 1976	At their home		He was taken to "El Chalet", where he was tortured and murdered. His body was found in La Plata River
Jorge Mario Roitman	Doctor	December 2, 1976	At their home		He was transferred to "El Chalet", tortured and disappeared
Jacqueline Romano	Doctor	December 1, 1976	Ezeiza Polyclinic	December 12, 1976	She was transferred to "El Chalet" and tortured.
Marta Elena Graiff	Sterilization area employee	January 11, 1977	At their home	December 11, 1976	She was transferred to "El Chalet" and tortured.
Julio César Quiroga	Employee	January 5, 1977	At their home		He was transferred to "El Chalet", tortured and disappeared

Likewise, the trial excluded 10 cases of persons who were still missing (although the sentence ordered an investigation into the events that occurred). Among them are: Ignacio Jesús Sánchez, a technical student who worked in the Hemotherapy service; María Ángela Cairo de Garassino, an ER nurse; and Daniel Eduardo Calleja, a psychiatrist.

== Witnesses ==
At the trial, the following persons appeared as witnesses to what happened:

María Cristina Pflüger.; Alejandra Roitman.; Gladis Evarista Cuervo.; Carlos Juan Apezteguía.; Zulema Dina Chester.; Marta Elena Graiff.; Hugo Alberto Nin.; Lidia Cristina Albano.; Camilo Francisco Campos.; Berta Golberg de González.; Carmen Alicia García Otero de Sabio.; Daniel Manigot.; Rubén Ernesto Drago.; Carlos Aguirre.; Hernando Luis Sala.; María Alejandra Rodríguez de Pérez.; Ana María González.; Jorge Alberto Mosquera.; Marta Amanda Morales.; Emma del Carmen Piacquadio.; Roberto Hugo Espelosín.	Juan Manuel Nava.; Élida Esther Cano de Verdun.; Julio Constantino Sabio.; Amalia Luisa García.; María Cristina Amuchástegui.; Marta Raquel Centurión.; Ernesto Luis Curet.; Raúl Arnaldo Valdez.; Alfredo Rómulo Monteverde.; Abel Jasovich.; Liliana Nélida Lorenzo.; Amadeo Pedro Barousse.; Mary Rosa Rodríguez de Ibarrola.; Carlos Andrés Paradela.; Susana Norma Guerrero.; Davor Kvaternik.; Sara Luisa Levy.; Sabina Ester Peralta de Manssur.; Elena Erna Gutsch.; Mirta Carolina Bordón.; Alicia Barreda.	Mónica Eva Pini.; Mauricio Schraier.; Silvia María Lama.; Marta Lifsicas de Chester.; Dora Ana Graiff.; César Ernesto de la Fuente.; Lidia Irene Haiewski.; Ana Rosa Drak.; Jacinto Medrano.; Jorge Enrique de Vera.; Jacqueline Romano.; Ana María Mühlmann.; Graciela Leonor Donato.; Rodolfo Senen Gancedo.; Juan Jorge Villalba.; Alicia Squartini.; Manuel Irán Campos.; Pedro Ruiz.; Dora Elvira Agustín.; Julio César Quiroga.; Gerda Flagel de Quiroga.

== Sentence ==
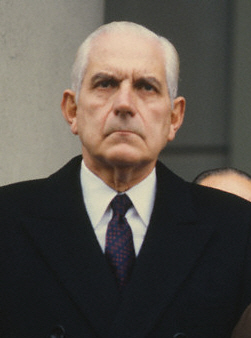
Reynaldo Bignone, one of those sentenced in the trial.

In the final arguments, the complaint requested 25 years in prison for the three charged, while the prosecution requested the same amount for Bignone, 20 years for Muiña and 12 years for Mariani.

- Hipólito Mariani, who during the trial admitted knowing the actions of the "Swat Group", confirmed the existence of the clandestine detention center. He was sentenced to 8 years imprisonment and absolute and perpetual disqualification for illegal deprivation of liberty committed as a public official with abuse of his functions or without the formalities prescribed by law, aggravated by its duration of more than one month; and the imposition of torments imposed by a public official on the prisoner who guards against Cuervo.
- Luis Muiña, was sentenced to 13 years of imprisonment, absolute and perpetual disqualification for illegal deprivation of liberty committed as a public official with abuse of his functions or without the formalities prescribed by law, aggravated by the use of violence or threats, reiterated on five (5) occasions; imposition of torments in relation to the conditions of captivity imposed, reiterated on five (5) occasions; and imposition of torments imposed by a public official on the prisoner in custody, reiterated on five (5) occasions; Cuervo, Chester, Roitman, Romano and Graiff.
- Reynaldo Benito Antonio Bignone, was sentenced to 15 years in prison and special disqualification for double the term of the sentence for illegal deprivation of liberty committed as a public official with abuse of his functions or without the formalities prescribed by law, aggravated by the use of violence or threats, reiterated on fifteen (15) occasions; Albano, Muñoz, Apezteguía, Mühlmann, Campos, Malamud, Nava, Rodríguez Otero, Agustín, Bevilacqua, Manigot, Drago, Nin, Sala and Kvaternik.

The sentence ordered a parallel investigation into Carlos Andrés Paradela, a dentist who ended up as head of the security service. He testified as a witness on October 28, 2011, during the trial, but that day one of the survivors, Hugo Nin, recognized him as one of the hospital's collaborators.

The convictions became final on August 21, 2013, when the Supreme Court rejected the defense's last remaining appeal.

In 2014, the National Chamber of Criminal Cassation rejected the application of the repealed "two-for-one" benefit, which provides for double counting the number of days in pretrial detention after the accused has served two years in that situation, which had been used by the court to calculate the sentence handed down in 2011 to Bignone and Muiña.

== Critiques ==
The trial was not without its critics. Before it began, the time that passed between the elevation to trial and the beginning of the trial was questioned, so much so that the Chamber of Criminal Cassation reassigned the trial to Federal Oral Court 3. This tribunal did not carry out the trial either because of its three members, one excused himself and was recused by Bignone's defense and two others were recused by the complaint for "not guaranteeing impartiality". For all this, it was finally reassigned to Federal Oral Court 2.

At the same time, the trial was criticized by human rights organizations and the prosecution itself for not having accepted the charge of homicide against the charged –despite the fact that in the Trial of the Juntas the murders had already been proven–, and for the sentences being lower than the required amounts.

== Sources ==
- Full sentence of the Posadas Hospital Trial (PDF) (in Spanish), 2012, archived from the original (PDF) on 2 January 2015
