= Day of Remembrance for Truth and Justice =

Public holiday in Argentina, 24 March

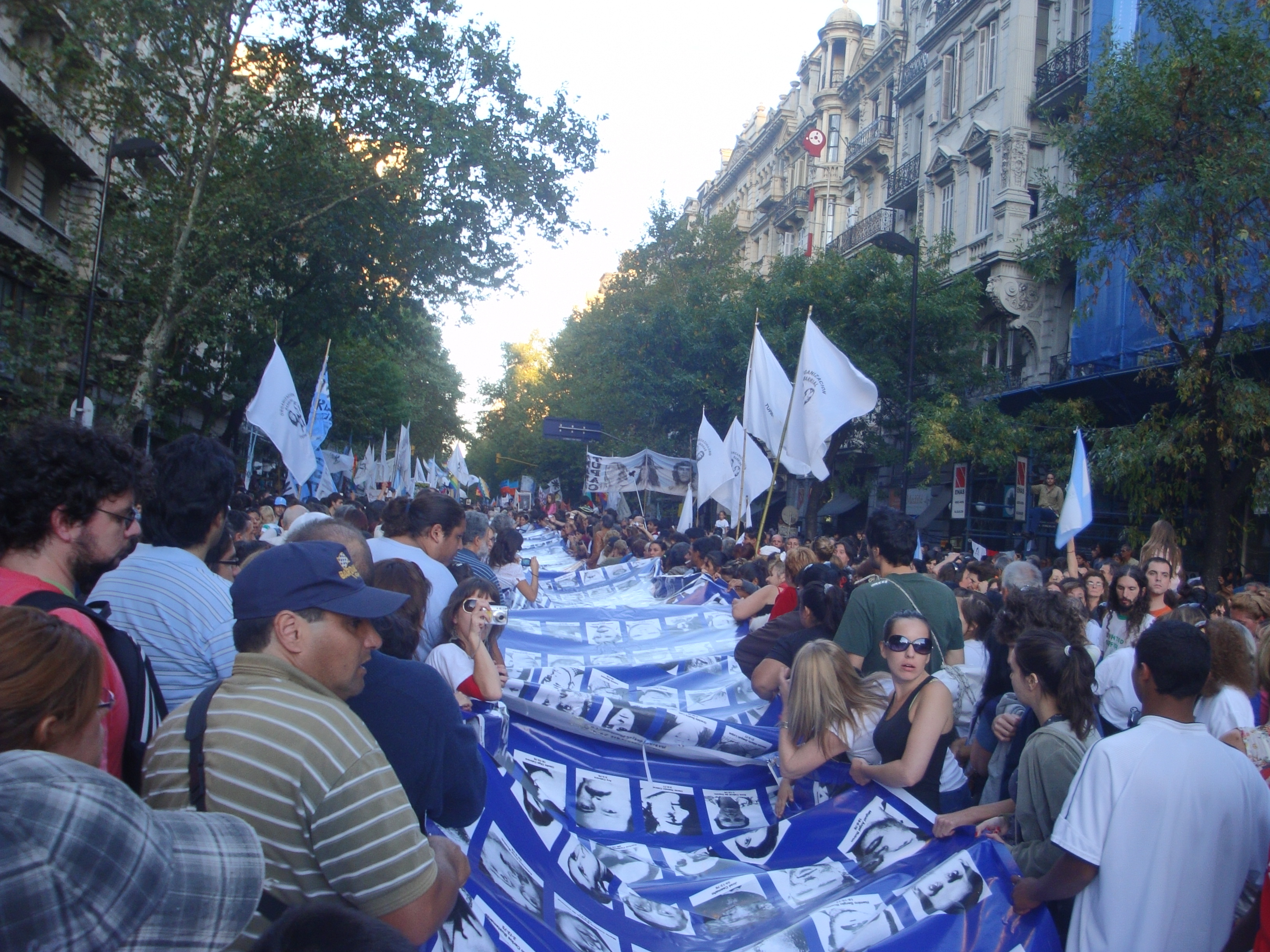
- Flag with images of those who disappeared during a demonstration in Buenos Aires to commemorate the 35th anniversary of the 1976 coup in Argentina.
- Observed by: Argentina
- Significance: Commemoration of the 1976 Argentine coup d'état
- Date: 24 March
- Next time: 24 March 2027
- Frequency: annual

The Day of Remembrance for Truth and Justice (Spanish: Día de la Memoria por la Verdad y la Justicia) is a public holiday in Argentina, commemorating the victims of the Civic-military dictatorship of Argentina. It is held on 24 March, the anniversary of the coup d'état of 1976 that brought the National Reorganization Process to power.

The commemoration was sanctioned as Law 25633 by the Argentine National Congress on 1 August 2002, and promulgated by the Executive Branch on 22 August of the same year. However, it was not implemented as a public national holiday until 2006. The 30th anniversary of the coup was marked by massive demonstrations.

== See also ==
- Dirty War
- Operation Condor
- National Commission on the Disappearance of Persons
- National Archive for Memory
