= Operation Charly =

Alleged right-wing Argentine plot against left-wing activists in Central America

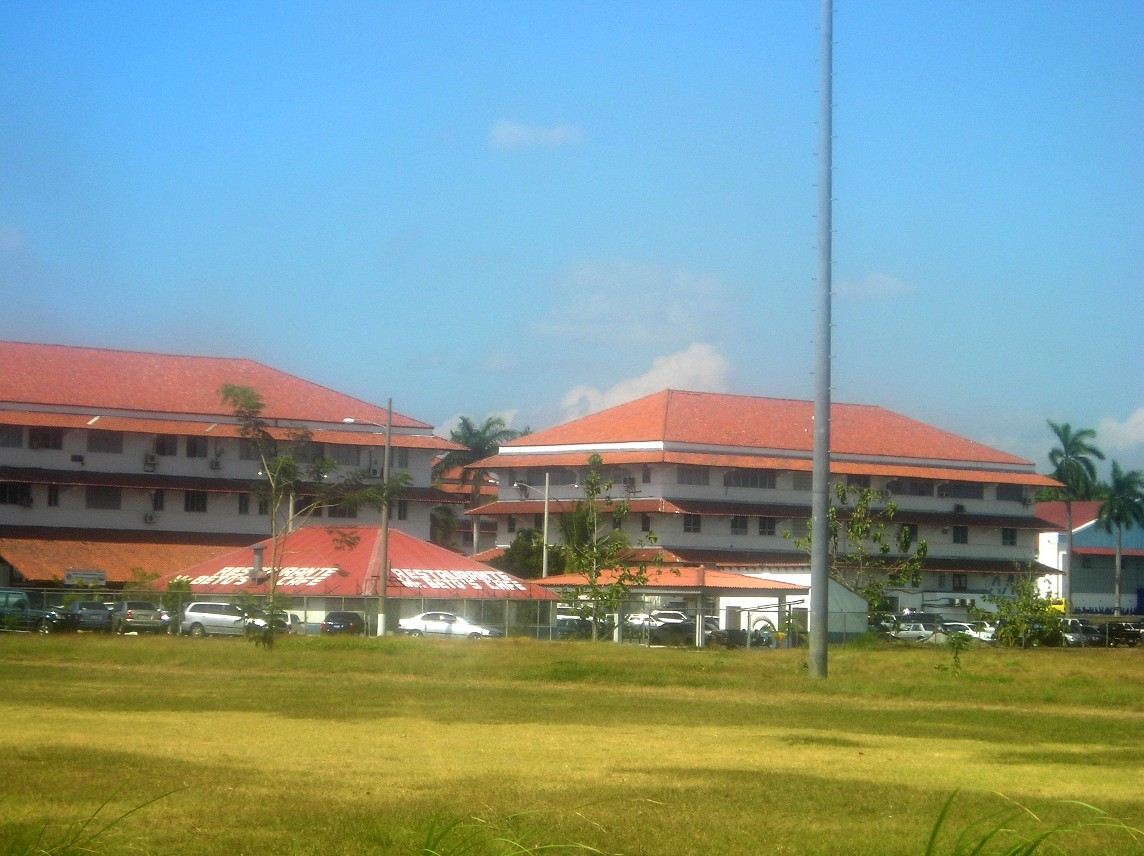
Panama, School of the Americas in 2006

Operation Charly (Spanish: Operación Charly) was allegedly the code-name given to a program during the 1970s and 1980s undertaken by the junta in Argentina with the objective of providing military and counterinsurgency assistance to right-wing dictatorships and insurgents in Central America.

== Exportation of the "Argentine" method to Central America ==
Argentina's military involvement in Central America began during the Nicaraguan Revolution between 1977 and 1979, when Argentina began supporting the Somoza family regime in Nicaragua in its fight against the Sandinista Front. Argentina supported the Somoza dictatorship until its overthrow by the Sandinistas in July 1979. In November 1979, before the 13th Conference of American Armies in Bogotá, Colombia, junta leader General Roberto Eduardo Viola offered a proposition calling for a joint Latin American effort against, on his words, "leftist subversion", citing this as "the greatest military threat in the region". Pursuant with this plan (referred to as the "Viola Plan"), Argentina expanded its counterinsurgency and military assistance to El Salvador, Guatemala and Honduras at the behest of the military leadership in those countries.

The role of Argentina in Central America reached its zenith in the early 1980s with National Reorganization Process's involvement in covertly directing the Contra rebellion in Nicaragua in conjunction with the CIA. In December 1981, General Leopoldo Galtieri, in a palace revolution, replaced General Viola as the head of Argentina's military junta. A few days before assuming power, Galtieri exposed in a speech in Miami the Argentine government's decision to constitute itself as an unconditional ally of the U.S. in the "world struggle against Communism": "Argentina and the United States will march together in the ideological war which is starting in the world" [sic]. At one point, beginning in early-1982, plans were underway between the United States and the Argentine junta for the creation of a large Latin American military force, which would be directed by an Argentine officer, with the initial aim of landing in El Salvador and pushing the revolutionaries to Honduras to exterminate them, and then to invade Nicaragua and topple the Sandinista regime. The operation would have been protected by a remodelling of the Inter-American Treaty of Reciprocal Assistance (TIAR).

Within the framework of Operation Charly, the Argentine military also implemented, with the help of the Reagan Administration, a series of arms interdiction programs in Central America to disrupt the supply of weapons to the insurgencies in the region. New York Times journalist Leslie Gelb explained that "Argentina would be responsible, with funds from North American intelligence, of attacking the flux of equipment which was transiting Nicaragua to El Salvador and Guatemala ".

Operation Charly was executed by a group of military figures who had already taken part in Operation Condor, which had started as soon as 1973 and concerned international cooperation between intelligence agencies to permit greater repression of the left-wing opposition. U.S. journalist Martha Honey documented the exportation of "social control techniques" which the Argentine army had "brutally perfected" in Argentina to Central American countries. Among the counter-insurgency tactics exported to Central America by Argentina within the framework of Operation Charly, were the systemic use of torture, death squads and forced disappearances — a U.S. embassy cable spoke of the "tactics of disappearance". According to French journalist Marie-Monique Robin, these methods themselves had been taught to the Argentine military first by the French military, drawing on the experience of the 1957 Battle of Algiers, and then by their U.S. counterparts.

According to Noam Chomsky, starting in 1979, the Argentine military established covert military centers in Panama, Costa Rica, El Salvador, Honduras, Guatemala and Nicaragua. Among others examples, Noam Chomsky says the death squads which began to act in Honduras in 1980 were attributed to the importation of the "Argentine method".

In July 1980, the Grupo de Tareas Exterior (GTE, External Operations Group) headed by Guillermo Suárez Mason, of the 601 Intelligence Battalion, took part in the Cocaine Coup of Luis García Meza in Bolivia, with the assistance of the Italian terrorist Stefano Delle Chiaie and Nazi war criminal Klaus Barbie. The Argentine secret services hired 70 foreign agents to assist in the coup. The cocaine trade helped fund the covert operations.

Ariel Armony, president of the Goldfarb Center in the Colby College, stated in journalist María Seoane's article that "it would be more appropriate to speak of a dirty war at a continental level than isolated conflicts at a national scale", and that "in this war the distinction between combatants and civilian population were erased, while national frontiers were subordinated to "ideological frontiers" of the East-West conflict." In particular, the Argentine military was not satisfied with "annihilating" the opposition in the country, but repealed any distinction between internal and external policy.

== Argentine military intervention in Central America (1977–1986) ==
=== Nicaragua ===
After obtaining power in 1976, the National Reorganization Process formed close ties with the regime of Anastasio Somoza Debayle in Nicaragua among other right-wing dictatorships in Latin America. In 1977 at a meeting of the Conference of American Armies (CAA) held in the Nicaraguan capital city of Managua, junta members Gen. Roberto Viola and Admiral Emilio Massera secretly pledged unconditional support of Somoza regime in its fight against left-wing subversion and agreed to send advisors and material support to Nicaragua to assist President Somoza's National Guard.

Pursuant with these military agreements, Somoza's Guardsmen were sent to police and military academies in Argentina to undergo training and Argentina began to send arms and advisors to Nicaragua to bolster the National Guard, in addition to similar services being provided by the United States. According to an Argentine advisor with the Nicaraguan National Guard, the intelligence techniques used by the Somoza regime consisted of essentially the same "unconventional" methods which had been used in Argentina's Dirty War (torture, forced disappearance, extrajudicial killings). Argentina's aid programs increased proportionate to the growth of the popular movement against the Somoza regime and the degree of isolation of the Somoza regime. Following the suspension of U.S. military aid and training in 1979, Argentina became one of the Somoza regime's principal sources of arms alongside Israel, Brazil and South Africa.

In addition to providing arms and training to Somoza's National Guard, the Argentine junta also executed a number of Condor operations on Nicaraguan soil during the late-1970s, benefitting from close rapport between Argentine secret services and the Nicaraguan regime. The military in Argentina sent agents of the Batallón de Inteligencia 601 and the SIDE to Nicaragua in 1978 with the aim of apprehending and eliminating Argentine guerrillas fighting within the ranks of the Sandinistas. A special commando team from Argentina worked in conjunction with Somoza's OSN (Office of National Security) and its Argentine advisors with the objective of capturing exiled squadrons from the ERP and the Montoneros.

Following the overthrow of Anastasio Somoza Debayle by the Sandinista Front, Argentina played a central role in the formation of the Contras. Shortly after the Sandinista victory in July 1979, agents from Argentine intelligence began to organize exiled members of Somoza's National Guard residing in Guatemala into an anti-Sandinista insurgency. Following the election of U.S. President Ronald Reagan, the Argentine government sought arrangements for the Argentine military to organize and train the contras in Honduras in collaboration with the Honduran government and the U.S. Central Intelligence Agency. Shortly thereafter, Argentina oversaw the relocation of Contra bases from Guatemala to Honduras. Along with security forces from Honduras, some Argentine special force units, including Batallón de Inteligencia 601, began training the Nicaraguan Contras at the Lepaterique base.

In August 1981, a CIA official met with Honduran military staff, Argentine military and intelligence advisors, and the Contra leadership and expressed his support for the contra operations. On November 1, 1981, the Director of the CIA William Casey met with the Chief of Staff of the Argentine military; the two purportedly agreed that Argentina would oversee the contras and the United States would provide money and weapons. In late-1981, President Reagan authorized the U.S. to support the contras by giving them money, arms, and equipment. This aid was transported and distributed to the Contras by way of Argentina. With new weapons and logistical support, the scale of Contra attacks increased and the ranks of the Contras swelled as recruitment became more feasible. By the end of 1982, the Contras were conducting attacks deeper inside Nicaragua than before.

=== Honduras ===
In the immediate aftermath of the Nicaraguan Revolution in 1979, the National Reorganization Process dispatched a large Argentine military mission to Honduras. At the time, General Gustavo Álvarez Martínez, a former student of Argentina's Colegio Militar de la Nación (class of 1961) and graduate of the School of the Americas, was commander of a branch of the Honduran security forces known as the Fuerza de Seguridad Publica (FUSEP). Álvarez Martínez was a proponent of the "Argentine Method", viewing it as an effective tool against subversion in the hemisphere, and sought increased Argentine military influence in Honduras. Argentina's military program in Honduras expanded after 1981 when General Gustavo Álvarez Martínez, offered his country to the CIA and the Argentine military as a base for conducting operations opposing the Sandinista government in Nicaragua. By the end of 1981, 150 Argentine military advisors were active in Honduras training members of the Honduran security forces and providing training to the Nicaraguan Contras based in Honduras. According to the NGO Equipo Nizkor, though the Argentine mission in Honduras was downgraded after the Falklands War, Argentine officers remained active in Honduras until 1984, some of them until 1986, well after the 1983 election of Raúl Alfonsín.

Battalion 316's name indicated the unit's service to three military units and sixteen battalions of the Honduran Army. This unit was charged with the task of carrying out political assassinations and torture of suspected political opponents of the government, effectively implementing the "Argentine Method" in Honduras. At least 184 suspected government opponents including teachers, politicians, and union bosses were assassinated by Battalion 316 during the 1980s.

=== El Salvador ===
Argentina played a role in supporting the Salvadoran government during the El Salvador Civil War. As early as 1979, the National Reorganization Process supported the Salvadoran government militarily with intelligence training, weapons and counterinsurgency advisors. This support continued until well after the United States had established itself as the principle supplier of weapons to the Salvadoran security forces. According to secret documents from the Argentine military, the purpose of this aid was to strengthen inter-military relations between Argentina and El Salvador and "contribute to hardening [El Salvador's] position in the widening struggle against subversion, alongside other countries in the region."

In fall of 1981, the administration of U.S. President Ronald Reagan requested that the high command of the Argentine military increase its assistance to El Salvador. The Argentine government ratified an agreement by which U.S. intelligence would provide the Argentine government with intelligence and logistics support for an arms interdiction program to stem the flow of military supplies to the FMLN from Cuba and Nicaragua. In addition to agreeing to coordinate arms interdiction operations, the Argentine General Directorate of Military Industries (DGFM) supplied El Salvador with light and heavy weapons, ammunition and military spare parts worth U.S.$20 million in February 1982.

=== Guatemala ===
The military junta in Argentina was a prominent source of both material aid and inspiration to the Guatemalan military during the Guatemalan Civil War, especially during the final two years of the Lucas government. Argentina's involvement had initially began in 1980, when the Videla regime dispatched army and naval officers to Guatemala, under contract from President Fernando Romeo Lucas García, to assist the security forces in counterinsurgency operations. Argentine involvement in Guatemala expanded when, in October 1981, the Guatemalan government and the Argentine military junta formalized secret accords which augmented Argentine participation in government counterinsurgency operations. As part of the agreement, two-hundred Guatemalan officers were dispatched to Buenos Aires to undergo advanced military intelligence training, which included instruction in interrogation. In addition to working with the regular security forces, Argentine military advisors as well as a squadron of the Batallón de Inteligencia 601 worked directly with the Lucas government's paramilitary death squads, most notably the Ejército Secreto Anticomunista (ESA).

Technical support from Argentina played a crucial role in the success of the army's urban counterinsurgency campaign carried out in Guatemala City in July 1981. By way of the Guatemalan military's new computer service (installed by Tadiran Electronics Industries Ltd. of Israel), Argentine advisors introduced a data analysis system developed during the "Dirty War" in Argentina, which was used to monitor electrical and water usage to pinpoint the coordinates of guerrilla safe-houses. Due in part to this support, a number of clandestine "safe-houses" operated by the insurgents were subsequently infiltrated and a clandestine network of the Organizacion del Pueblo en Armas (ORPA) was destroyed in Guatemala City. Argentine military advisors also participated in the Guatemalan army's rural scorched-earth campaign in the Guatemalan highlands in 1981 code-named "Operation Ash 81."

== See also ==
- Dirty War
- United States-Latin American relations
- Central American Crisis
- Guatemala Civil War
- El Salvador Civil War
- Nicaraguan Revolution

== Bibliography ==
- Armony, Ariel C. (1999), La Argentina, los Estados Unidos y la Cruzada Anti-Comunista en América Central, 1977–1984, Quilmes: Universidad Nacional de Quilmes. ISBN. (Argentina, the United States, and the anti-communist crusade in Central America, 1977–1984, Athens, Ohio: Ohio University Center for International Studies, 1997. ISBN 0-89680-196-9)
- Bardini, Roberto: "Los militares de EEUU y Argentina en América Central y las Malvinas", en Argenpress. La política en la semana (1 de febrero de 2003): 2003.
- Bardini, Roberto (1988), Monjes, mercenarios y mercaderes, libro del autor de este trabajo, México : Alpa Corral. ISBN.
- Butazzoni, Fernando: "La historia secreta de un doble asesinato", en Marcha. Montevideo (1 de junio de 2005): 2005.
- Honey, Martha (1994). The Argentines: the first cut-outs in Washington's dirty war. Gainesville, Fl: University Press of Florida. ISBN 0-8130-1250-3.
- Maechling, Charles: "The Argentine pariah", en Foreign Policy. Invierno 1981–1982(45): 1981. pp 69–83.
- Seoane, María: "Los secretos de la guerra sucia continental de la dictadura", en Clarín. Especiales: A 30 años de la noche más larga (24 de marzo de 2006): 2006.
