= Horacio Tomás Liendo =

Argentenian politician

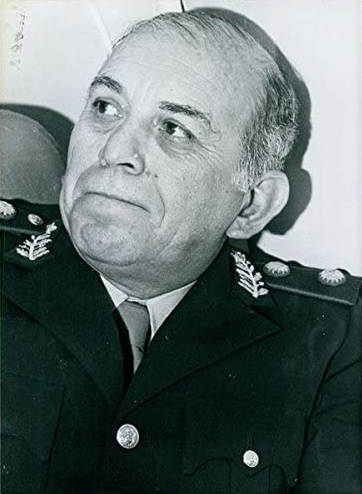

44th President of Argentina
- Interim; 21 November 1981 – 11 December 1981
- Appointed by: National Reorganization Process
- Vice President: Vacant
- Preceded by: Roberto Eduardo Viola
- Succeeded by: Carlos Lacoste (interim)

Minister of the Interior
- In office 29 March 1981 – 12 December 1981
- Preceded by: Albano Harguindeguy
- Succeeded by: Alfredo Oscar Saint Jean

Chief of the Joint Chiefs of Staff of the Armed Forces of the Argentine Republic
- In office 2 January 1980 – 29 March 1981
- Preceded by: José María Romero
- Succeeded by: Llamil Reston

Minister of Labor
- In office 29 March 1976 – 8 February 1979
- Preceded by: Miguel Unamuno
- Succeeded by: Llamil Reston

Personal details
- Born: 17 December 1924 Córdoba, Argentina
- Died: 24 August 2007 (aged 82) Buenos Aires, Argentina

Military service
- Allegiance: Argentina
- Branch/service: Argentine Army
- Years of service: 1947-1981
- Rank: (Pre-1991 epaulette) Division General

Horacio Tomás Liendo (17 December 1924 – 27 August 2007) was an Argentinian military officer, who served in various positions during the National Reorganization Process such as Minister of Labour between 1976 and 1979, and also Minister of Interior in 1981. He was also the interim president of Argentina for 21 days from November to December 1981.

He was born in Córdoba on 17 December 1924 and was formed as Army officer at the Colegio Militar de la Nación. When President Roberto Eduardo Viola was suffering a heart ailment in 1981, he became interim president. He died in Buenos Aires at age of 82.
