= National Reorganization Process =

1976–1983 Argentine military dictatorship

Argentine Republic República Argentina
- 1976–1983
- Flag Coat of arms
- Anthem: Himno Nacional Argentino
- Map of Argentina showing undisputed territory in dark green, and territorial claims in light green.
- Capital and largest city: Buenos Aires; 34°36′S 58°23′W
- Common languages: Spanish
- Religion: Roman Catholicism
- Demonyms: Argentine; Argentinian; Argentinean
- Government: Federal presidential republic under a military dictatorship
- Head of state
  - 1976: Military junta (Jorge Rafael Videla, Emilio Eduardo Massera and Orlando Ramón Agosti)
  - 1976–1981: Jorge Rafael Videla
  - 1981: Roberto Eduardo Viola
  - 1981: Horacio Tomás Liendo (acting)
  - 1981: Carlos Lacoste (acting)
  - 1981–1982: Leopoldo Galtieri
  - 1982: Alfredo Oscar Saint-Jean (acting)
  - 1982–1983: Reynaldo Bignone
- Historical era: Cold War
  - 1976 coup d'état: 24 March 1976
  - Falklands War: 2 April – 14 June 1982
  - 1983 general election: 30 October 1983
  - Junta disestablished: 10 December 1983

Area
  - Total: 2,780,085 km^{2} (1,073,397 sq mi) (Note: The total area claimed was 3,669,710.7 km^{2} of which the American continental part is 2,780,084.6 km^{2} (including Tierra del Fuego Province). Area does not include territorial claims in Antarctica (873,718.4 km^{2}, including the South Orkney Islands and the South Shetland Islands) and the South Atlantic Islands (15,907.7 km^{2}, including the Falkland Islands, the South Georgia Island and the South Sandwich Islands).)

Population
  - 1980 census: 27,949,480
  - Density: 10/km^{2} (25.9/sq mi)
- GDP (PPP): 1983 estimate
  - Total: $684.37 billion
  - Per capita: $23,285
- GDP (nominal): 1983 estimate
  - Total: $103.98 billion
  - Per capita: $3,538
- HDI (1980): 0.665 medium
- Currency: Argentine peso (ARS)
- Time zone: UTC–03:00 (ART)
- Calling code: +54
- ISO 3166 code: AR
Preceded by	Succeeded by
Argentine Republic	Argentine Republic

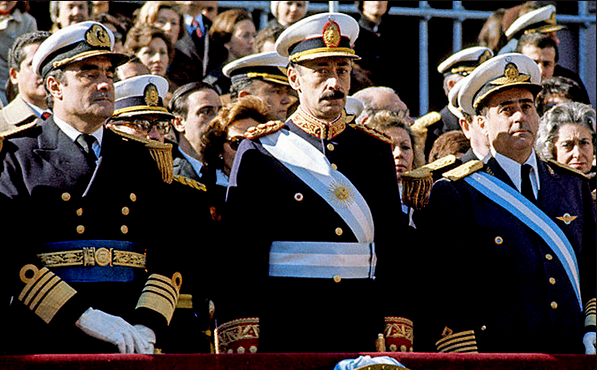
The "first military junta" – Admiral Emilio Massera, Lieutenant General Jorge Videla and Brigadier General Orlando Agosti (from left to right) – observing the Independence Day military parade on Avenida del Libertador, 9 July 1978

The National Reorganization Process (Spanish: Proceso de Reorganización Nacional, PRN; often simply el Proceso, "the Process") (Note: Name proclaimed by the military dictatorship itself in acts, documents, etc., throughout its time in power.) was the military dictatorship that ruled Argentina from the coup d'état of 24 March 1976 until the transfer of power on 10 December 1983 to a government elected at the 1983 general election. In Argentina it is often known simply as the última junta militar ("last military junta"), última dictadura militar ("last military dictatorship"), última dictadura cívico-militar ("last civil–military dictatorship"), or última dictadura cívico-eclesial-militar ("last civil–clerical-military dictatorship")—because there have been several in the country's history and no others like it since it ended. In journalism, and more rarely in academic literature, it has sometimes been referred to as totalitarian for its state terrorism mechanisms and an ideology centered around "national integrity", although the more commonly used terms in academia are "authoritarian" and "bureaucratic-authoritarian". Some scholars describe the regime as an example of neo-fascism.

The Argentine Armed Forces seized political power during the March 1976 coup against the presidency of Isabel Perón, the successor and widow of former President Juan Perón, at a time of growing economic and political instability. Congress was suspended, political parties were banned, civil rights were limited, and free market and deregulation policies were introduced. The President of Argentina and his ministers were appointed from military personnel while leftists and Peronists were persecuted. The junta launched the Dirty War, a campaign of state terrorism against opponents involving torture, extrajudicial murder and systematic forced disappearances. Some 30,000 citizens were killed or "disappeared" during the military dictatorship.

Public opposition due to civil rights abuses and inability to solve the worsening economic crisis in Argentina caused the junta to invade the Falkland Islands in April 1982. After starting and then losing the Falklands War against the United Kingdom in June, the junta began to collapse and finally relinquished power in 1983 with the election of President Raúl Alfonsín.

Members of the National Reorganization Process were prosecuted in the Trial of the Juntas in 1985, receiving sentences ranging from life imprisonment to courts-martial for mishandling the Falklands War. They were pardoned by President Carlos Menem in 1989 but were re-arrested on new charges in the early 2000s. Almost all of the surviving junta members are currently serving sentences for crimes against humanity and genocide.

== Background ==
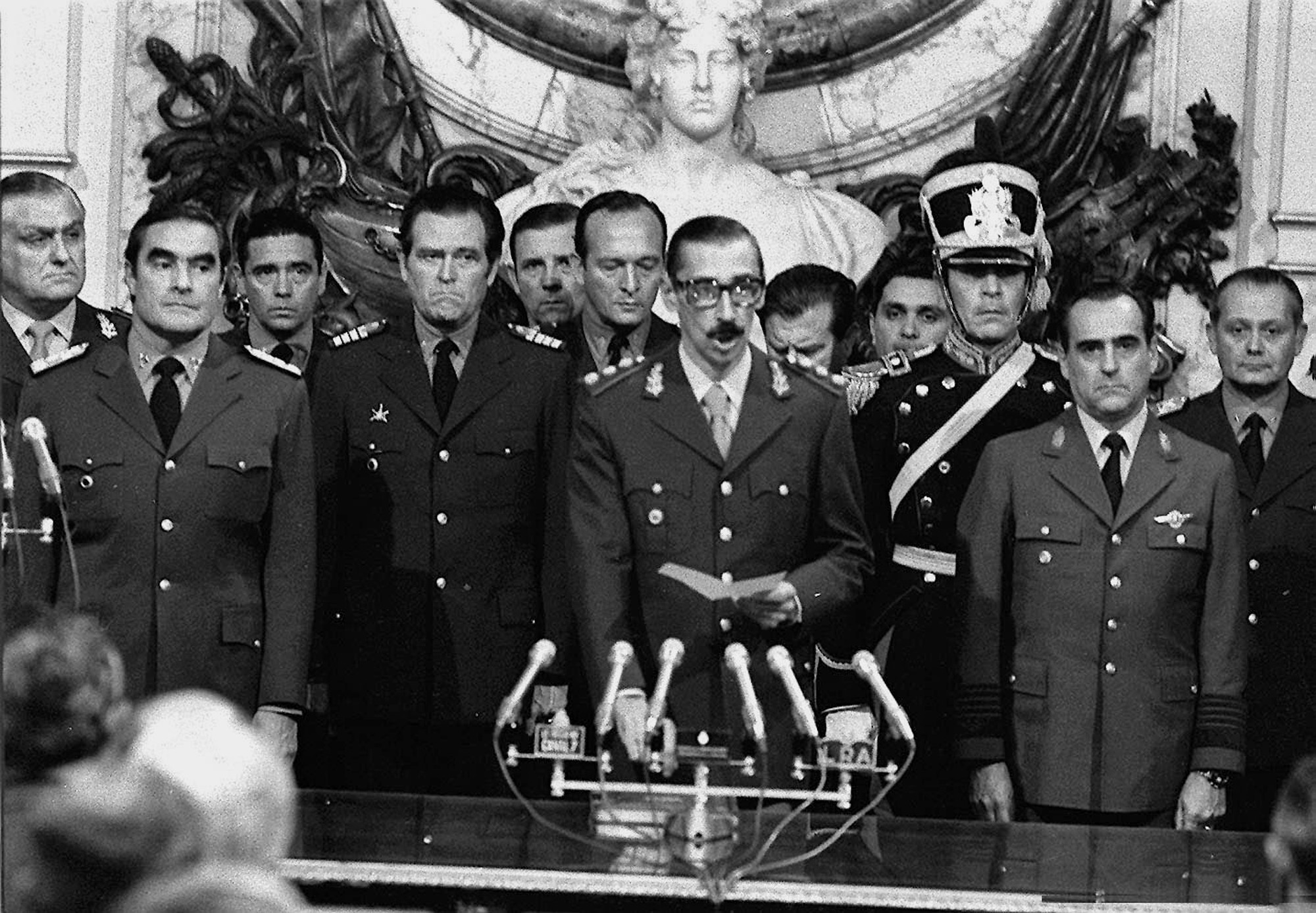
Lieutenant General Jorge Rafael Videla swearing the Oath as he becomes the president

The military of Argentina has always been highly influential in Argentine politics, and Argentine history is laced with frequent and prolonged intervals of military rule. The popular Argentine leader Juan Perón, three-time President of Argentina, was a colonel in the army who first came to political power in the aftermath of a 1943 military coup. He advocated a new policy dubbed Justicialism, a nationalist policy that he claimed was a "Third Position", an alternative to both capitalism and communism. After being reelected president by popular vote, Perón was deposed and exiled by the Revolución Libertadora in 1955.

After a series of weak governments and a seven-year military government, Perón returned to Argentina in 1973 after 18 years in exile in Francoist Spain, amid escalating political unrest, divisions in the Peronist movement, and frequent outbreaks of political violence. His return was marked by the 20 June 1973 Ezeiza massacre, after which the right wing of the Peronist movement became dominant.

Perón was democratically elected president in 1973, but died in July 1974. His vice president and third wife, Isabel Perón, succeeded him, but she proved to be a weak, ineffectual ruler. A number of revolutionary organizations—chief among them Montoneros, a group of far-left Peronists—escalated their wave of political violence (including kidnappings and bombings) against the campaign of harsh repressive and retaliatory measures enforced by the military and the police. In addition, right-wing paramilitary groups entered the cycle of violence, such as the Triple A death squad, founded by José López Rega, Perón's Minister of Social Welfare and a member of the P2 masonic lodge. The situation escalated until Mrs. Perón was overthrown. She was replaced on 24 March 1976 by a military junta led by Lieutenant General Jorge Rafael Videla.

== Dirty War ==
Final report (in Spanish) from the Military Government about forced disappearances. Channel 7, Argentine Public Television (1983).

Official investigations undertaken after the end of the Dirty War by the National Commission on the Disappearance of Persons documented 8,961 desaparecidos (victims of forced disappearance) and other human rights violations, noting that the correct number must be higher. Many cases were never reported, when whole families disappeared, and the military destroyed many of its records months before the return of democracy. Among the "disappeared" were pregnant women, who were kept alive until giving birth under often primitive circumstances in the secret prisons. The infants were generally illegally adopted by military or political families affiliated with the administration, and the mothers were generally killed. Thousands of detainees were drugged, loaded into aircraft, stripped naked and then thrown into the Rio de la Plata or the Atlantic Ocean to drown in what became known as "death flights".

The film The Official Story (1984), which won the Oscar for the Best Foreign Language Film category in 1985, addresses this situation. The Argentine secret service SIDE (Secretaría de Inteligencia del Estado) also cooperated with the DINA in Pinochet's Chile and other South American intelligence agencies. Eight South American nations supported endeavours to eradicate left-leaning groups on the continent, known as Operation Condor, a United States-backed campaign of anti-democratic and political repression and state terror. It is estimated to have caused the deaths of more than 60,000 people. SIDE also trained—for example in the Honduran Lepaterique base—the Nicaraguan Contras who were fighting the Sandinista government there.

The regime shut down the legislature and restricted both freedom of the press and freedom of speech, adopting severe media censorship. The 1978 World Cup, which Argentina hosted and won, was used as propaganda to rally its people under a nationalist pretense.

Corruption, a failing economy, growing public awareness of the harsh repressive measures taken by the regime, and the military defeat in the Falklands War eroded the regime's image. The last de facto president, Reynaldo Bignone, was forced to call for elections by the lack of support within the Army and the steadily growing pressure of public opinion. On 30 October 1983, elections were held, and democracy was formally restored on 10 December, when President Raúl Alfonsín was sworn in.

== Economic policies ==
As Argentina's new de facto president, Videla faced a collapsing economy wracked by soaring inflation. He largely left economic policies in the hands of Minister José Alfredo Martínez de Hoz, who adopted a free trade and deregulatory economic policy.

Martínez de Hoz took measures to restore economic growth, reversing Peronism in favour of a free market economy. His economic measures were moderately successful. He enjoyed the personal friendship of David Rockefeller, who facilitated Chase Manhattan Bank and International Monetary Fund loans of nearly US$1 billion after of his arrival.

He eliminated all price controls and the exchange controls regime. The black market and shortages disappeared. He freed exports (removed existing prohibitions and quotas and export taxes were repealed) and imports (removed existing prohibitions, quotas, and licenses and gradually reduced import tariffs). During his tenure, the foreign debt increased fourfold, and disparities between the upper and lower classes became much more pronounced. The period ended in a tenfold devaluation and one of the worst financial crises in Argentine history.

Viola appointed Lorenzo Sigaut as Finance Minister, and it became clear that Sigaut was looking for ways to reverse some of Martínez de Hoz's policies. Notably, Sigaut abandoned the sliding exchange rate mechanism and devalued the peso, after boasting that "they who gamble on the dollar will lose". Argentines braced for a recession after the excesses of the "sweet money" years, which destabilized Viola's position.

He appointed conservative economist and publisher Roberto Alemann as Economy Minister. Alemann inherited an economy in deep recession in the aftermath of Martínez de Hoz's policies. Alemann slashed spending, began selling off government-owned industries (with only minor success), enacted a tight monetary policy, and ordered salaries frozen (amid 130% inflation).

The Central Bank Circular 1050, which tied mortgage rates to the value of the U.S. dollar locally, was maintained, leading to further deepening of the crisis; GDP fell by 5%, and business investment by 20% over the weakened levels of 1981.

Bignone chose Domingo Cavallo to head the Argentine Central Bank. Cavallo inherited a foreign debt installment guarantee program that shielded billions of private debt from the collapse of the peso, costing the treasury billions. He instituted controls over the facility, such as the indexation of payments, but this move and the rescission of Circular 1050 threw the banking sector against him; Cavallo and Dagnino Pastore were replaced in August.

The President of the Central Bank, Julio González del Solar, undid many of these controls, transferring billions more in private foreign debt to the Central Bank, although he stopped short of reinstating the hated "1050."

Six years of intermittent wage freezes had left real wages close to 40% lower than during Perón's tenure, leading to growing labor unrest. Bignone's decision to restore limited rights of speech and right to assembly, including the right to strike, led to increased strike activity. Saúl Ubaldini, leader of the General Confederation of Labour, Argentina's largest labor union, was particularly active. The new Economy Minister, Jorge Wehbe, a banking executive with previous experience in the post, reluctantly granted two large, mandatory wage increases in late 1982.

== Foreign policy ==
=== U.S. support ===
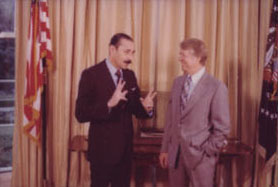
Videla met with U.S. President Jimmy Carter at the White House on 9 September 1977.

The United States provided military assistance to the junta and, at the start of the Dirty War, Secretary of State Henry Kissinger gave them a "green light" to engage in political repression of real or perceived opponents.

The U.S. Congress approved a request by the Ford Administration, to grant $50,000,000 in security assistance to the junta. In 1977 and 1978 the United States sold more than $120,000,000 in spare military parts to Argentina, and in 1977 the U.S. Department of Defense granted $700,000 to train 217 Argentine military officers.

In 1978, president Jimmy Carter secured a congressional cutoff of all U.S. arms transfers for the human rights violations.

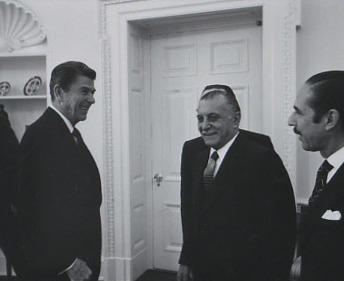
Viola met with U.S. President Ronald Reagan and Argentine Ambassador Jorge A. Aja Espil at the White House on 17 March 1981.

American-Argentine relations improved dramatically with Ronald Reagan, which asserted that the previous Carter Administration had weakened U.S. diplomatic relationships with Cold War allies in Argentina, and reversed the previous administration's official condemnation of the junta's human rights practices. However, relations soured after the U.S. supported the United Kingdom in the Falklands War.

The re-establishment of diplomatic ties allowed for CIA collaboration with the Argentine intelligence service in arming and training the Nicaraguan Contras against the Sandinista government. Argentina also provided security advisors, intelligence training and some material support to forces in Guatemala, El Salvador and Honduras to suppress local rebel groups as part of a program called Operation Charly.

=== Military intervention in Central America ===
After attaining power in 1976, the National Reorganization Process formed close ties with the regime of Anastasio Somoza Debayle in Nicaragua among other right-wing dictatorships in Latin America. In 1977 at a meeting of the Conference of American Armies (CAA) held in the Nicaraguan capital city of Managua, junta members General Roberto Viola and Admiral Emilio Massera secretly pledged unconditional support of Somoza family regime in its fight against left-wing subversion and agreed to send advisors and material support to Nicaragua to assist President Somoza's National Guard.

Pursuant with these military agreements, Somoza's Guardsmen were sent to police and military academies in Argentina to undergo training and Argentina began to send arms and advisors to Nicaragua to bolster the National Guard, in addition to similar services being provided by the United States. According to an Argentine advisor with the Nicaraguan National Guard, the intelligence techniques used by the Somoza regime consisted of essentially the same "unconventional" methods which had been used in Argentina's Dirty War (torture, forced disappearance, extrajudicial killings). Argentina's aid programs increased proportionate to the growth of the popular movement against the Somoza regime and the degree of isolation of the Somoza regime. Following the suspension of U.S. military aid and training in 1979, Argentina became one of the Somoza regime's principal sources of arms alongside Israel, Brazil and South Africa.

In addition to providing arms and training to Somoza's National Guard, the Argentine junta also executed a number of Condor operations on Nicaraguan soil during the late 1970s, benefitting from close rapport between Argentine secret services and the Nicaraguan regime. The military in Argentina sent agents of the Batallón de Inteligencia 601 and the SIDE to Nicaragua in 1978 with the aim of apprehending and eliminating Argentine guerrillas fighting within the ranks of the Sandinistas. A special commando team from Argentina worked in conjunction with Somoza's OSN (Office of National Security) and its Argentine advisors with the objective of capturing exiled squadrons from the ERP and the Montoneros.

Following the overthrow of Somoza by the FSLN, Argentina played a central role in the formation of the Contras. Shortly after the Sandinista victory in July 1979, agents from Argentine intelligence began to organize exiled members of Somoza's National Guard residing in Guatemala into an anti-Sandinista insurgency. Following the election of U.S. President Ronald Reagan, the Argentine government sought arrangements for the Argentine military to organize and train the contras in Honduras in collaboration with the Honduran government and the U.S. Central Intelligence Agency (CIA). Shortly thereafter, Argentina oversaw the relocation of Contra bases from Guatemala to Honduras. There, some Argentine special force units, such as Batallón de Inteligencia 601, began to train the Nicaraguan Contras, particularly at Lepaterique base alongside some members of the Honduran security forces.

In August 1981, a CIA official met with Honduran military staff, Argentine military and intelligence advisors, and the Contra leadership and expressed his support for the contra operations. On 1 November 1981, the Director of the CIA William Casey met with the Chief of Staff of the Argentine military; the two purportedly agreed that Argentina would oversee the contras and the United States would provide money and weapons. In late 1981, President Reagan authorized the U.S. to support the contras by giving them money, arms, and equipment. This aid was transported and distributed to the Contras by way of Argentina. With new weapons and logistical support, the scale of Contra attacks increased and the ranks of the Contras swelled as recruitment became more feasible. By the end of 1982, the Contras were conducting attacks deeper inside Nicaragua than before.

In the immediate aftermath of the Nicaraguan Revolution in 1979, the National Reorganization Process dispatched a large Argentine military mission to Honduras. At the time, General Gustavo Álvarez Martínez, a former student of Argentina's Colegio Militar de la Nación (class of 1961) and graduate of the School of the Americas, was commander of a branch of the Honduran security forces known as the Fuerza de Seguridad Publica (FUSEP). Álvarez Martínez was a proponent of the "Argentine Method", viewing it as an effective tool against subversion in the hemisphere, and sought increased Argentine military influence in Honduras. Argentina's military program in Honduras expanded after 1981 when General Gustavo Álvarez Martínez, offered his country to the CIA and the Argentine military as a base for conducting operations opposing the Sandinista government in Nicaragua. By the end of 1981, 150 Argentine military advisors were active in Honduras training members of the Honduran security forces and providing training to the Nicaraguan Contras based in Honduras. According to the NGO Equipo Nizkor, though the Argentine mission in Honduras was downgraded after the Falklands War, Argentine officers remained active in Honduras until 1984, some of them until 1986, well after the 1983 election of Raúl Alfonsín.

Battalion 316's name indicated the unit's service to three military units and sixteen battalions of the Honduran Army. This unit was charged with the task of carrying out political assassinations and torture of suspected political opponents of the government, effectively implementing the "Argentine Method" in Honduras. At least 184 suspected government opponents including teachers, politicians, and union bosses were assassinated by Battalion 316 during the 1980s.

Argentina played a role in supporting the Salvadoran government during the El Salvador Civil War. As early as 1979, the National Reorganization Process supported the Salvadoran government militarily with intelligence training, weapons and counterinsurgency advisors. This support continued until well after the United States had established itself as the principal supplier of weapons to the Salvadoran security forces. According to secret documents from the Argentine military, the purpose of this aid was to strengthen inter-military relations between Argentina and El Salvador and "contribute to hardening [El Salvador's] position in the widening struggle against subversion, alongside other countries in the region."

In fall of 1981, the administration of U.S. President Ronald Reagan requested that the high command of the Argentine military increase its assistance to El Salvador. The Argentine government ratified an agreement by which U.S. intelligence would provide the Argentine government with intelligence and logistics support for an arms interdiction program to stem the flow of military supplies to the FMLN from Cuba and Nicaragua. In addition to agreeing to coordinate arms interdiction operations, the Argentine General Directorate of Military Industries (DGFM) supplied El Salvador with light and heavy weapons, ammunition and military spare parts worth U.S.$20 million in February 1982.

The military junta in Argentina was a prominent source of both material aid and inspiration to the Guatemalan military during the Guatemalan Civil War, especially during the final two years of the Lucas government. Argentina's involvement had initially began in 1980, when the Videla regime dispatched army and naval officers to Guatemala, under contract from President Fernando Romeo Lucas García, to assist the security forces in counterinsurgency operations. Argentine involvement in Guatemala expanded when, in October 1981, the Guatemalan government and the Argentine military junta formalized secret accords which augmented Argentine participation in government counterinsurgency operations. As part of the agreement, two-hundred Guatemalan officers were dispatched to Buenos Aires to undergo advanced military intelligence training, which included instruction in interrogation.

=== Alleged French support ===
In 2003, French journalist Marie-Monique Robin documented that Valéry Giscard d'Estaing's government secretly collaborated with Videla's junta in Argentina and Augusto Pinochet's regime in Chile.

Green deputies Noël Mamère, Martine Billard and Yves Cochet passed a resolution in September 2003 for a Parliamentary Commission to be convened on the "role of France in the support of military regimes in Latin America from 1973 to 1984", to be held before the Foreign Affairs Commission of the National Assembly and presided over by Edouard Balladur. Apart from Le Monde, newspapers remained silent about this request. Deputy Roland Blum, who was in charge of the commission, refused to let Marie-Monique Robin testify.

In December 2003, his staff published a 12-page document that said no agreement had been signed between France and Argentina about military forces. But, Marie-Monique Robin had sent them a copy of the document she found showing such an agreement.

When Minister of Foreign Affairs Dominique de Villepin traveled to Chile in February 2004, he claimed that no cooperation between France and the military regimes had occurred.

=== Relations with the Soviet Union ===
Despite the officially anti-Communist leanings of Videla's junta in the context of the Cold War, the regime maintained extensive trade and diplomatic ties with the Soviet Union.

== Legal moves by Baltasar Garzón and Peter Tatchell ==
Spanish judge Baltasar Garzón unsuccessfully attempted to question former United States Secretary of State Henry Kissinger as a witness in his investigations into the Argentine disappearances during one of Kissinger's visits to Britain, and Peter Tatchell was unable to have Kissinger arrested during the same visit for alleged war crimes under the Geneva Conventions Act.

== Aftermath ==
Following a decree of President Alfonsín mandating prosecution of the leaders of the Proceso for acts committed during their tenure, they were tried and convicted in 1985 (Juicio a las Juntas). In 1989, President Carlos Menem pardoned them during his first year in office, which was highly controversial. He said the pardons were part of healing the country. The Argentine Supreme Court declared amnesty laws unconstitutional in 2005. As a result, the government resumed trials against military officers who had been indicted for actions during the Dirty War.

Adolfo Scilingo, an Argentine naval officer during the junta, was tried for his role in jettisoning drugged and naked political dissidents from military aircraft to their deaths in the Atlantic Ocean during the junta years. He was convicted in Spain in 2005 of crimes against humanity and sentenced to 640 years in prison. The sentence was later raised to 1084 years.

Christian von Wernich, a Catholic priest and former chaplain of the Buenos Aires Province Police, was arrested in 2003 on accusations of torture of political prisoners in illegal detention centers. He was convicted at trial, and on 9 October 2007, the Argentine court sentenced him to life in prison.

On 25 March 2013, Federal Criminal Oral Court No. 1 of La Plata rendered decision on a public trial for crimes committed during the civilian-military dictatorship in Argentina (1976–1983) in the network of clandestine detention, torture and extermination centers ("clandestine centers") known as the "Camps Circuit". By conventional view, genocide requires intention to destroy a group in whole or in part. Where the intention is to destroy a group in part, that part must be "substantial", either in the numerical sense, or in the sense of being impactful to the physical survival of the group. The facts being prosecuted involved attacks against "subversive elements", which do not appear, on first sight, to be a "substantial" part of the group defined by nationality or by sheer numerical representation. This decision is significant in adopting the theory, originating from genocide scholar Daniel Feierstein, that the targeted victims are significant to the national group, as their destruction fundamentally altered the social fabric of the nation.

A major trial, nicknamed "the ESMA mega-trial", of 63 people accused of crimes against humanity (lesa humanidad) during the 1976–1983 dictatorship, including those involved in death flights, was reaching its close in July 2015. Eight hundred thirty witnesses and 789 victims were heard. There had been two previous trials after the Supreme Court struck down an amnesty the military dictatorship had granted its members; in the first, the accused committed suicide before a verdict was reached; in a 2009 trial, twelve defendants were sentenced to life imprisonment.

In December 2018, two former executives of a local Ford Motor Company plant near Buenos Aires, Pedro Muller and Hector Sibilla, were convicted for their involvement in the abduction and torture of 24 workers during the reign of the military junta. Lawyers involved in the case say this is the first time former executives of a multinational corporation operating in Argentina under the military junta have been convicted of crimes against humanity.

== Commemoration ==
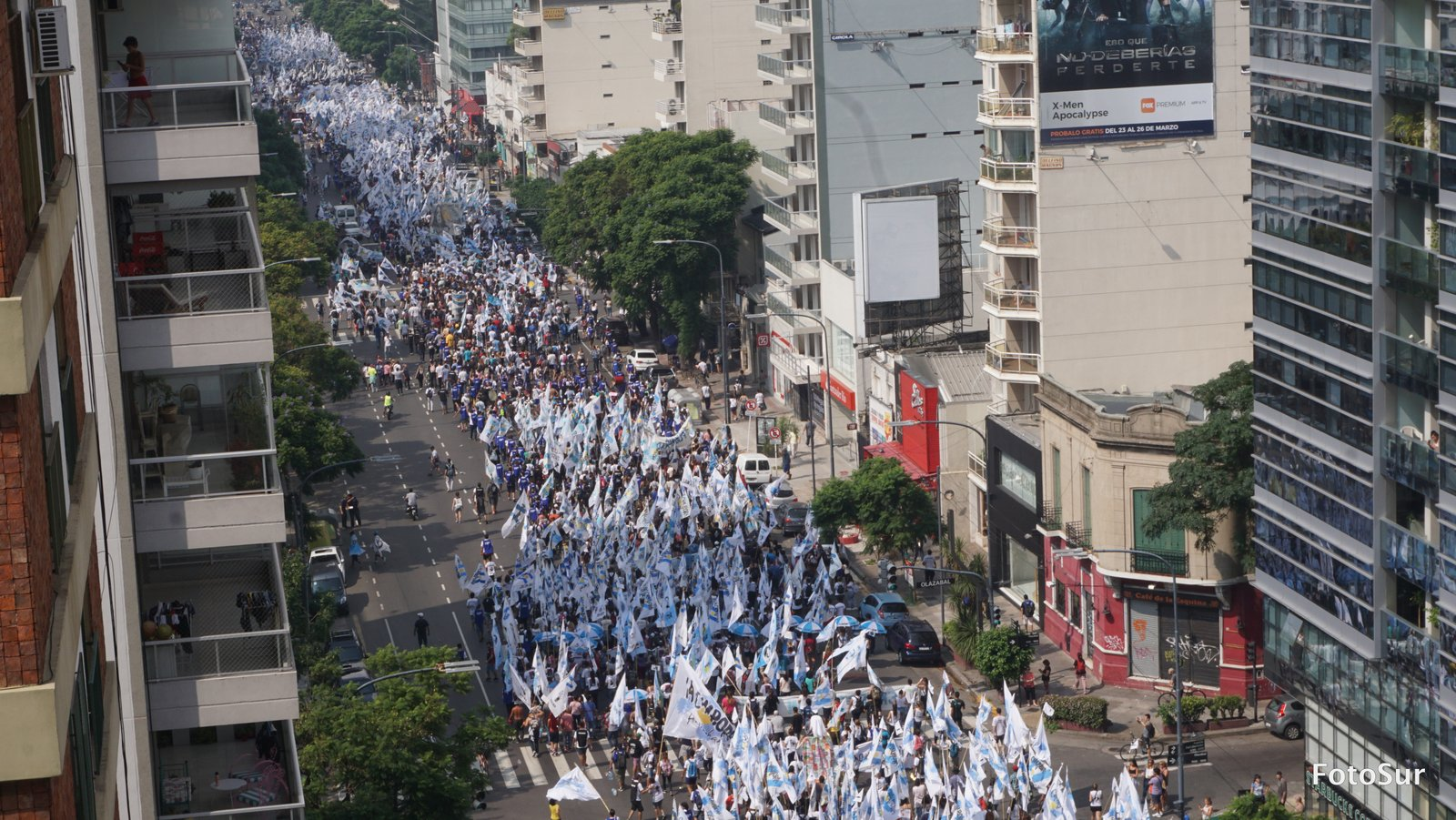
Argentines commemorate victims of military dictatorship, 24 March 2017

In 2002, the Argentine Congress declared the date of 24 March as the Day of Remembrance for Truth and Justice, in commemoration for the victims of the dictatorship. In 2006, thirty years after the coup d'état that started the Proceso, the Day of Memory was declared a national public holiday. The anniversary of the coup was remembered by massive official events and demonstrations throughout the country.

== Presidents of Argentina, 1976–1983 ==
- Jorge Rafael Videla

29 March 1976 – 29 March 1981.

- Roberto Eduardo Viola

29 March – 11 December 1981.

- Horacio Tomás Liendo (Interim)

21 November – 11 December 1981.

- Carlos Lacoste (Interim)

11–22 December 1981.

- Leopoldo Galtieri

22 December 1981 – 18 June 1982.

- Alfredo Oscar Saint Jean (Interim)

18 June – 1 July 1982.

- Reynaldo Bignone

1 July 1982 – 10 December 1983.

== Military juntas ==
During the Process, there were four successive military juntas, each consisting of the heads of the three branches of the Argentine Armed Forces:

Commander-in-Chief of the Army	Commander-in-Chief of the Navy	Commander-in-Chief of the Air Force
First Junta (1976–1978)
Lieutenant General Jorge Videla	Admiral Emilio Massera	Brigadier General Orlando Agosti
Second Junta (1978–1981)
Lieutenant General Roberto Viola	Admiral Armando Lambruschini	Brigadier General Omar Graffigna
Third Junta (1981–1982)
Lieutenant General Leopoldo Galtieri	Admiral Jorge Anaya	Brigadier General Basilio Lami Dozo
Fourth Junta (1982–1983)
Lieutenant General Cristino Nicolaides	Admiral Rubén Franco	Brigadier General Augusto Hughes

== See also ==
- HIJOS – Hijos e Hijas por la Identidad y la Justicia contra el Olvido y el Silencio
- History of Argentina
- Mothers of the Plaza de Mayo
- Theory of the two demons
