= Hilario Fernández Long =

Argentine structural engineer and educator

Hilario Fernández Long (12 September 1918 – 23 December 2002) was an Argentine structural engineer and educator.

He was born in Bahía Blanca and was of Spanish and Volga German descent. He graduated as a Civil Engineer from the University of Buenos Aires in 1941 and his professional life was centered on structural engineering. He participated in, among other projects, the construction of the Argentine National Library, the Buenos Aires IBM Building and the Zárate–Brazo Largo and Chaco-Corrientes bridges. He pioneered the use of computer tools in his discipline.

He coauthored many technical articles, and published an Introduction to Go and a Go Manual that were instrumentals in the introduction of the game in Argentina.

Besides his teaching activities in several universities, he was the dean of the Engineering School and Rector (i.e. President) of the University of Buenos Aires. After Juan Carlos Onganía's coup d'état in 1966, he resigned as the University autonomy was violated in the Noche de los Bastones Largos (Long Stick's Night) when the police entered by force in the campuses, beating students and professors, effectively ending the so-called "Golden Age" of the Buenos Aires University. His political commitment was reaffirmed when President Raúl Alfonsín nominated him as a member of the CONADEP commission that investigated the fate of the desaparecidos.

After retirement, he was distinguished as Emeritus Professor of both the University of Buenos Aires and the Pontifical Catholic University of Argentina and Doctor Honoris Causa of the University of Buenos Aires. He died in Necochea.

He belonged to several organizations:

- Structural Engineer Association (honor member)
- National Academy of Exact, Physical and Natural Sciences
- National Education Academy
- American Society of Civil Engineering (life member)
- Argentine Go Association (founding member)
- Argentine Center of Engineers
- Asamblea Permanente pro Derechos Humanos – APDH (Permanent Assembly for Human Rights – member of the Presidency council)
