= Eduardo Rabossi =

Argentine philosopher and human rights activist

- Born: March 20, 1930; Buenos Aires, Argentina
- Died: November 11, 2005 (aged 75); Cusco, Peru
- Era: 20th & 21st century
- Region: Western philosophy
- Main interests: Analytic philosophy

Eduardo Rabossi (March 20, 1930 – November 11, 2005) was an Argentine philosopher and human rights activist.

== Biography ==
Eduardo Rabossi was born in Buenos Aires on March 20, 1930 and graduated in Law at the University of Buenos Aires (UBA) in 1955. Afterwards, he obtained his M.A. in philosophy at Duke University. The UBA was intervened by the military government in 1966, so he resigned his position as a teacher and worked in investigations at the Oxford university instead.

He is credited as a pioneer of analytic philosophy in Argentina. He was one of the founders and president of SADAF, the Argentine Society of Analytic Philosophy and the editor of its journal, Análisis Filosófico. He created that organization alongside Genario Carrió, Gregorio Klimovsky and Carlos Alchourrón, after his return from the United Kingdom.

He was designated by President Raúl Alfonsín member of the CONADEP, the national Commission to determine the fate of desaparecidos. The work was included in the Nunca más report. He was also appointed Undersecretary of Human Rights. He was also a member of APDH. He was called as a witness in the Trial of the Juntas, to explain his work for the CONADEP. He also helped Uruguay to clarify the fate of 130 Uruguayan died in Argentina during the Dirty War.

He died in Cusco, Peru on November 11, 2005, while participating in a professional congress.

== Works ==
- Filosofía de la mente y ciencia cognitiva, 1995
- La filosofía y el filosofar, 1994
- La carta universal de los derechos humanos, 1987
- Etica y análisis, 1985
- Philosophical Analysis in Latin America, 1982 (редактор)
- Estudios éticos, 1977
- Análisis filosófico, lenguaje y metafísica, 1977
- La justificación moral del castigo, 1976

== Bibliography ==
- Eduardo Rabossi: In Memoriam // Areté Revista de Filosofía Vol. XVIII, N° 2, 2006
- Bulygin, Eugenio (May 2007). "En memoria de Eduardo A. Rabossi". Análisis Filosófico (in Spanish). 27 (1). Buenos Aires. ISSN 1851-9636.
