= World Organisation Against Torture =

International coalition of non-governmental organizations

The World Organisation Against Torture (Organisation Mondiale Contre la Torture; OMCT) is the world's largest coalition of non-governmental organisations fighting against arbitrary detention, torture, summary and extrajudicial executions, forced disappearances and other forms of violence. With more than 200 affiliated organisations in its SOS-Torture Network, the OMCT aims at accompanying, reinforcing and protecting anti-torture organisations in particular in erosive environments and provides a comprehensive system of support and protection for human rights defenders around the world. The global network consists of local, national and regional organisations, which share the goal of eradicating torture and fostering respect of human rights for all.

The OMCT's Prevention of Torture programme helps its members prevent and report torture by strengthening their capacity through the SOS-Torture network to use United Nations human rights mechanisms. The programme submits alternative reports to UN Committees in collaboration with local NGOs, provides support for individuals and organisations wishing to challenge torture practices in international legal fora and publishes a practical guide on international and regional conventional mechanisms relevant to torture. OMCT is also mainstreaming women's and children's issues into the UN human rights mechanisms.

On 4 October 2007, former United Nations Secretary-General Kofi Annan became the new president of the OMCT Supporting Foundation.

Gerald Staberock has been Secretary General of the OMCT since 2011, and presently also serves as the Chair of the Board of the EU Human Rights Defenders Mechanism.

In 2026, the World Organisation Against Torture was designated as undesirable in Russia.

== Activities ==
The OMCT contributes to UN activities through three main activities.

=== Reporting ===
The OMCT submits alternative reports to the UN Committee Against Torture (CAT), the Human Rights Committee (HRC) and the Committee on the Rights of the Child (CRC), working with local NGOs. Reporting activities are designed to encourage national NGOs to report torture and follow up reports of torture through:

- the participation of local NGOs in drafting alternative reports and actively including them in relevant Committees' sessions, with the possibility of a follow-up meeting in the field;
- an integrated approach to questions relating to protection from torture and other ill-treatment of women and children, by involving organisations specialised in these issues in drafting alternative reports and in relevant Committees' sessions;
- greater dissemination of reports and of the Conclusions and Recommendations of the Committees in English and in the preferred language of the relevant country, through the publication of the reports that have been submitted.

=== Legal support ===
The OMCT supports individuals and organisations wishing to challenge torture practices in international legal forums. Complaint mechanisms can be used to achieve a number of different objectives including:

- protection for victims or persons under threat;
- obtaining reparations and compensation for victims;
- putting pressure on governments to end impunity in specific cases; and
- achieving changes in legislation and State practice which lead to serious human rights violations.

Many NGOs are not fully aware of how to use UN procedures to support their work in protecting victims from torture. The OMCT hopes to encourage and assist partner NGOs that are already active in the struggle against torture to present individual complaints and other relevant information to the CAT, the HRC, and the Committee on the Elimination of Discrimination against Women (CEDAW).

=== Practical guidance ===
The OMCT publishes a practical guide on international and regional conventional mechanisms relevant to torture. This Handbook is conceived as a tool for action. It addresses the practical needs of anybody using international mechanisms and bodies to challenge torture practices.

== See also ==
- Command responsibility
- Equipo Nizkor
- International humanitarian law
- UN Convention Against Torture
- Libyan Anti-torture Network (LAN)
