= Análisis Filosófico =

- Discipline: Philosophy
- Language: English, Spanish

Publication details
- History: 1981–present
- Publisher: Argentine Society of Analytic Philosophy
- Frequency: Biannually
- Open access: Yes

Standard abbreviations
- ISO 4: Anál. Filos.

Indexing
- ISSN: 0326-1301 (print); 1851-9636 (web)
- OCLC no.: 12714166

Links
- Journal homepage

Análisis Filosófico is a peer-reviewed biannual open access academic journal that publishes scholarly articles on theoretical and practical philosophy "in order to contribute to philosophical analysis development." The journal was established in 1981 as the official journal of the Argentine Society of Analytic Philosophy. The first editor-in-chief of Análisis Filosófico was the Argentine philosopher Eduardo Rabossi. It is available online through SciELO and is indexed in the Philosopher's Index.

The journal, albeit being published in Argentina, is open to contributions from other countries.

== See also ==
- List of philosophy journals
