= Leopoldo Galtieri =

Argentine general and military ruler (1926–2003)

Lieutenant General Leopoldo Galtieri
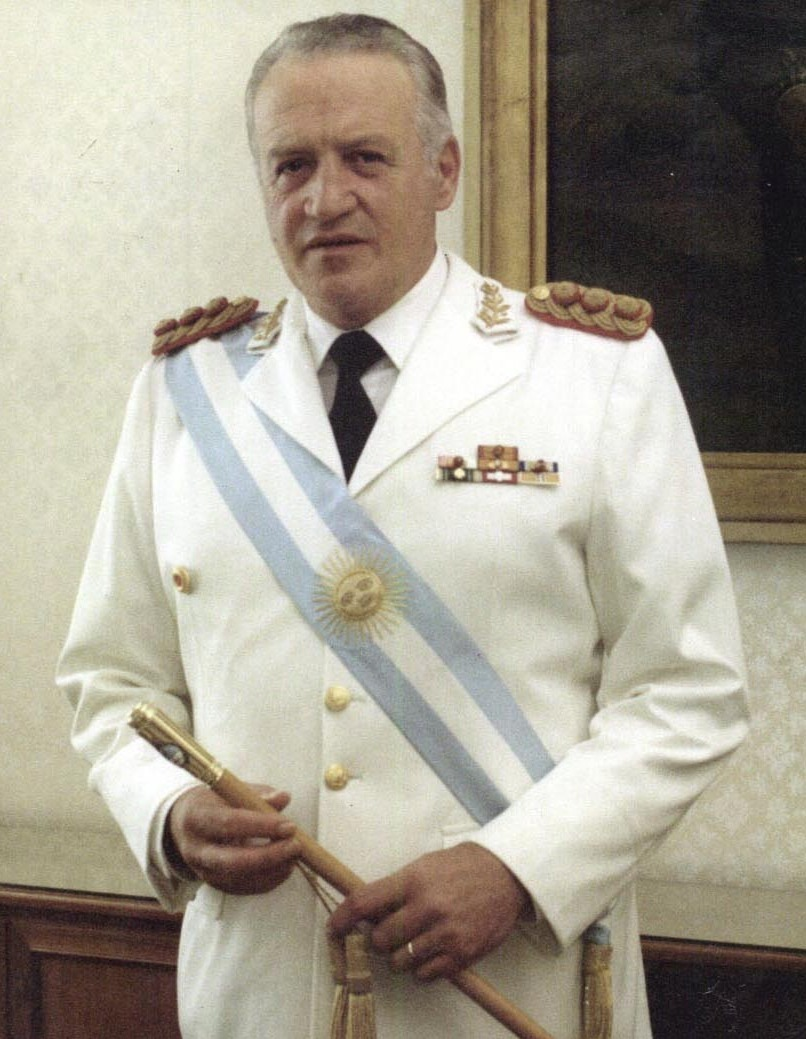
- Galtieri in 1981

46th President of Argentina
- In office 22 December 1981 – 17 June 1982
- Appointed by: National Reorganization Process
- Vice President: None
- Preceded by: Carlos Lacoste (interim)
- Succeeded by: Alfredo Oscar Saint Jean (interim)

Personal details
- Born: 15 July 1926 Caseros, Buenos Aires, Argentina
- Died: 12 January 2003 (aged 76) Buenos Aires, Argentina
- Spouse: Lucía Noemí Gentili (m. 1949)
- Children: 3
- Education: Colegio Militar de la Nación
- Profession: Military

Military service
- Allegiance: Argentina
- Branch/service: Argentine Army
- Years of service: 1944–1982
- Rank: (Pre-1991 epaulette) Lieutenant General
- Battles/wars: Falklands War

Leopoldo Fortunato Galtieri Castelli (Note: Spanish pronunciation: [leoˈpolðo foɾtuˈnato ɣalˈtjeɾi kasˈteli]) (15 July 1926 – 12 January 2003) was an Argentine military officer who served as the de facto President of Argentina from December 1981 to June 1982. Galtieri ruled as a military dictator during the National Reorganization Process as leader of the Third Junta with Jorge Anaya and Basilio Lami Dozo.

Galtieri was chief combat engineer of the Argentine Army and a patron of the 1976 military coup d'état, which helped him become commander-in-chief of the army in 1980. Galtieri overthrew Roberto Eduardo Viola, was appointed president, and established Argentina as a strong Cold War ally of NATO and the United States, while introducing fiscally conservative economic reforms, and increasing Argentine covert support for the anti-communist Contras guerrillas during the Nicaraguan civil war. In domestic policy, General Galtieri continued the Dirty War with the 601 Intelligence Battalion death squad reporting directly to him.

Galtieri's declining popularity due to his human rights abuses and the worsening economic stagnation caused him to order an invasion of the Falkland Islands in April 1982. Galtieri was removed from power after Argentina's defeat by the British Armed Forces in the Falklands War in June, which led to the restoration of democracy and, in 1986, his court martial prosecution and conviction for war crimes and other offences. Galtieri was pardoned by Carlos Menem in 1989 and lived in obscurity until his arrest for new charges shortly before his death in 2003.

== Early life ==
Leopoldo Fortunato Galtieri was born on 15 July 1926 in Caseros, Buenos Aires Province to working-class Italian Argentine parents Francisco Rosario Galtieri and Nélida Victoria Castelli. In 1943, at 17 years old, he enrolled at the National Military Academy to study civil engineering, and his early military career was as an officer in the engineering branch of the Argentine Army. As well as rising through the ranks of the military, he continued his studies in engineering until the mid-1950s. In 1949, he graduated from the US Army School of the Americas. In 1958, he became a professor of engineering at the Senior War College.

Galtieri was married to Lucía Noemí Gentili, and the couple had one son and two daughters.

== Rise to power ==
In 1975, after more than 25 years as a combat engineer, Galtieri became commander of the Argentine engineering corps. He was an enthusiastic supporter of the March 1976 coup d'état that overthrew President Isabel Perón and started the self-styled National Reorganisation Process, the establishment of a right-wing military junta government in Argentina. This helped him rise through the ranks, becoming a major general in 1977, and commander-in-chief of the army in 1980 with the rank of lieutenant general. During the junta's rule, Congress was suspended, trade unions, political parties, and provincial governments were banned, and in what became known as the Dirty War, between 9,000 and 30,000 people deemed left-wing subversives disappeared from society with torture and mass executions being commonplace. Argentina's economy had been in dire condition prior to the coup and recovered for a short time. An impending economic collapse was one of the main justifications for the overthrow of Perón and the civilian government.

In March 1981, Galtieri visited the United States and was warmly received, as the Reagan administration viewed the regime as a bulwark against communism. National Security Advisor Richard V. Allen described him as a "majestic general". An adherent to the Argentine military's Cold War-era doctrine of "ideological frontiers", Galtieri secured his country's support for Contra rebel groups opposing the Socialist Sandinista government in Nicaragua during the Nicaraguan Revolution. In August, he sent advisers to help organize the Nicaraguan Democratic Force (FDN, for a time the principal Contra group), as well as training FDN leaders in Argentine bases. His support for this initiative allowed Galtieri to remove a number of rival generals.

== Presidency ==
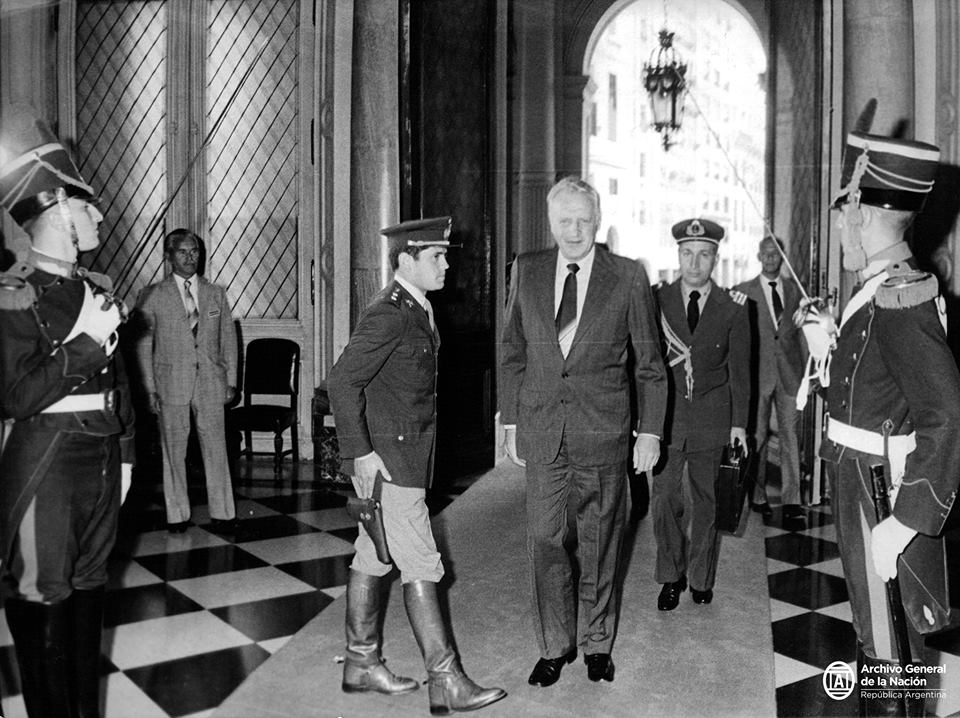
Galtieri on his first day as President of Argentina

On 22 December 1981, Galtieri was appointed President of Argentina eleven days after ousting Roberto Eduardo Viola, who had been in power since March. Officially, Viola resigned due to a health issue and designated Interior Minister Horacio Liendo as his successor. In reality, Viola was removed from power due to his regime's inability to reverse the economic crisis, which caused infighting within the military.

Galtieri retained direct control of the army whilst President of the governing Military Junta and did not appoint a new commander-in-chief.

=== Political policy ===
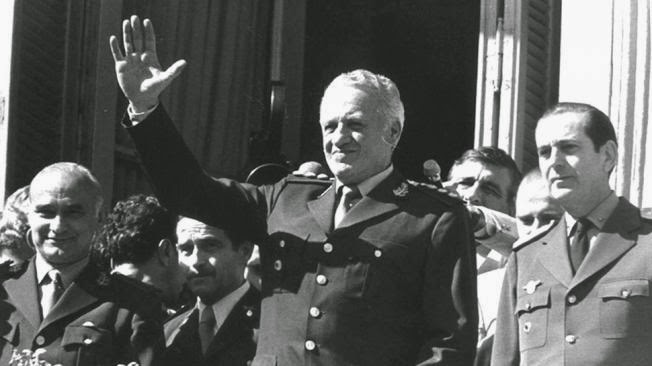
Galtieri in the Casa Rosada

Galtieri instituted limited political reforms which allowed the expression of dissent, and anti-junta demonstrations soon became common, as did agitation for a return to democracy.

=== Economic policy ===
Galtieri appointed conservative economist and publisher Roberto Alemann as Economy Minister. Alemann inherited an economy in deep recession in the aftermath of José Alfredo Martínez de Hoz's economic policies of the late 1970s. Alemann slashed spending, began selling off government-owned industries (with only minor success), enacted a tight monetary policy, and ordered salaries frozen (amid 130% inflation).

The Central Bank Circular 1050, which tied mortgage rates to the value of the US dollar locally, was maintained, however, leading to further deepening of the crisis; GDP fell by 5%, and business investment by 20% over the weakened levels of 1981.

One of Galtieri's closest allies, the head of the First Army Corps, General Guillermo Suárez Mason, was named Chairman of Yacimientos Petrolíferos Fiscales (YPF), at the time the state petroleum concern, and the largest company of any type in Argentina. Suárez Mason's role would contribute to a US$6 billion loss for the company, the largest recorded corporate loss in the world, up to that point.

=== Foreign policy ===
Galtieri supported the Central Intelligence Agency in its fight against the Sandinistas in Nicaragua, while he was warmly welcomed during his visit to the White House. Argentina support became the principal source of funds and training for the Contras during Galtieri's tenure.

Argentine military and intelligence cooperation with the Reagan Administration ended in 1982 when Argentina invaded the Falkland Islands.

=== Falklands War ===
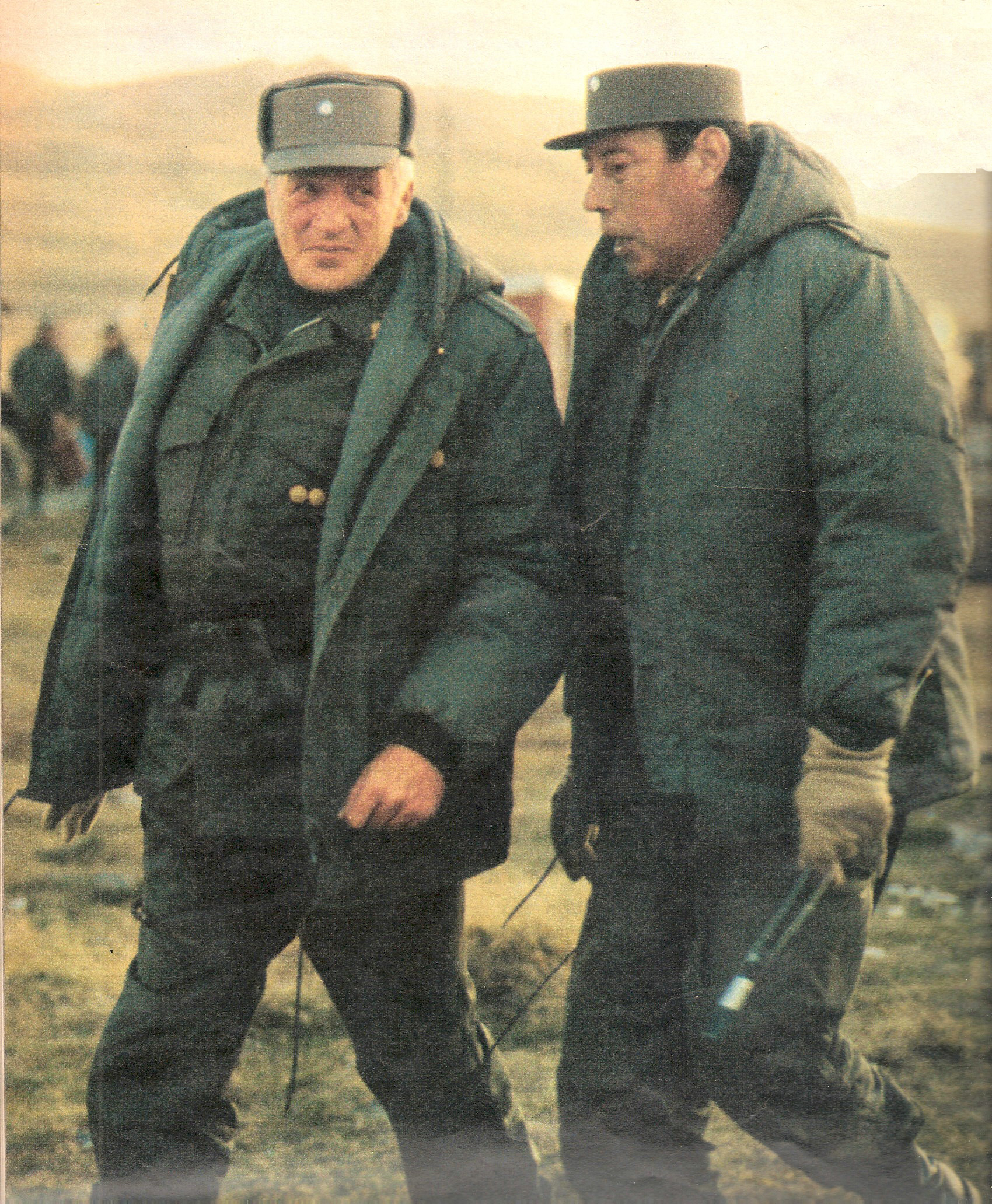
Galtieri in the Falkland Islands

By April 1982, Galtieri had been in office for four months and his popularity was low. On 2 April, on his orders, Argentine forces invaded the Falkland Islands, a British Overseas Territory subject to a long-standing Argentine sovereignty claim.

Initially, the invasion was popular in Argentina, and the anti-junta demonstrations were replaced by patriotic demonstrations in support of Galtieri.

Galtieri and most of his government mistakenly believed the United Kingdom would not respond militarily.

The British government, led by the prime minister, Margaret Thatcher, dispatched a naval task force to retake the islands militarily if Argentina refused to comply with a United Nations resolution demanding an immediate Argentine withdrawal. Argentina did not comply with the resolution, and the Falklands War began in April, and ended with the surrender to British forces on 14 June 1982.

Argentina was supported by Israel during the conflict, even though Galtieri's regime was openly anti-Semitic.

== Defeat, fall from power, trial and prison ==
On 14 June 1982, the Falklands' capital, Stanley, was retaken by British forces. The fact that an administration ruled by military figures failed to contain the British military response provoked an unprecedented crisis inside the Junta. Galtieri was blamed for the defeat and, on 17 June 1982, was removed from power by order of the rest of the military junta. He told the press, "I am going because the army did not give me the political support to continue as commander and President of the nation. I am not one of those who abandon the ship in the middle of tempests or difficult hours such as those the nation is living in today. The people of the nation know this.". He spent the next 18 months at a well-protected country retreat while democracy was restored to Argentina. Along with other members of the former junta, he was arrested in late 1983 and charged in a military court with human rights violations during the Dirty War and with mismanaging the Falklands War. The Argentine Army's internal investigation, known as the Rattenbach report after the general who led it, recommended that those responsible for the misconduct of the war be prosecuted under the Code of Military Justice. In 1986 he was sentenced to twelve years in prison.

Galtieri was cleared of the civil rights charges in December 1985, but (together with the Air Force and Navy commanders-in-chief) in May 1986, he was found guilty of mishandling the war and sentenced to prison. All three appealed in a civil court, and the prosecution appealed for heavier sentences. In November 1988, the original sentences were confirmed, and all three commanders were stripped of their rank. In 1989, Galtieri and 39 other officers of the dictatorship were pardoned by President Carlos Menem.

== Later life, further accusations and 2002 arrest ==
Galtieri was heavily blamed for Argentina's defeat in the Falklands War. Following his release from prison, he moved to the Villa Devoto suburb of Buenos Aires, and lived modestly with his wife Lucía. He became a recluse and refused most requests for interviews by journalists, though in a rare interview, he stated he had "no regrets" over anything he had done during the Dirty War. He lived on an army pension of 9,000 pesos per month, and attempted to claim a Presidential pension, but a judge denied it. In her ruling, the judge stated that his presidency had been illegal due to his never having been elected, and she also ordered him to pay court costs. In May 2002, he was invited to the military parade of the Argentine Army for the celebrations of Argentine Army Day (Día del Ejército Argentino): the presence of the former "president de facto" caused a huge controversy in public opinion after he was confronted and questioned by the journalist Martín Ciccioli in the television programme Kaos en la Ciudad.

In July 2002, new civil charges were brought concerning the kidnapping of children and the disappearance of 18 leftist sympathizers in the late 1970s (while Galtieri was commander of the Second Army Corps), and the disappearance or death of three Spanish citizens at about the same time. Galtieri faced prosecution with 28 other officials, but due to his poor health, he was allowed to remain at home. On 11 July 2002, Galtieri was arrested. On 12 July 2002, after being held in military barracks, Galtieri was, as a result of ongoing heart problems, transferred to house arrest, which he remained under at the time of his death in January 2003.

== Death ==
Galtieri underwent surgery for pancreatic cancer on 16 August 2002 at a hospital in Buenos Aires. He died there of a heart attack on 12 January 2003, aged 76. His body is interred in a small mausoleum at La Chacarita Cemetery.

== Notes ==
Political offices
Preceded by Carlos Lacoste	President of Argentina; 1981-1982	Succeeded by Alfredo Saint-Jean
