= Alfredo Oscar Saint Jean =

47th President of Argentina

Alfredo Oscar Saint-Jean
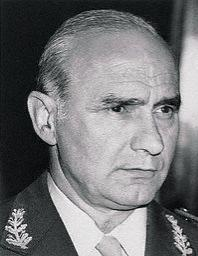
- Alfredo Oscar Saint Jean

47th President of Argentina
- Interim; 18 June 1982 – 1 July 1982
- Appointed by: Military junta
- Vice President: None
- Preceded by: Leopoldo Galtieri
- Succeeded by: Reynaldo Bignone

Interior Minister of Argentina (Assumed presidential duties from 18 June 1982 until 1 July 1982)
- In office 12 December 1981 – 1 July 1982
- President: Carlos Lacoste (Interim); Leopoldo Galtieri; Himself (acting)

Personal details
- Born: 11 November 1926 Chascomús, Buenos Aires
- Died: 2 September 1987 (aged 60)
- Spouse: María Beatriz Dauna
- Profession: Military
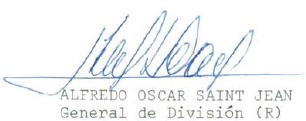
- Signature

Military service
- Allegiance: Argentina
- Branch/service: Argentine Army
- Years of service: 1944–1982
- Rank: (Pre-1991 epaulette) Division General
- Battles/wars: Dirty War

Alfredo Oscar Saint-Jean (Spanish pronunciation: [alˈfɾeðo osˈkaɾ ˈsent ˈtʃin]; 11 November 1926 – 2 September 1987) was an Argentine Army division general and politician, who served as President of Argentina in 1982.

== Earlier public role ==
Following the 1976 coup and the intervention of the Argentine military in public affairs during the National Reorganization Process, Alfredo Saint-Jean was one of the generals who held senior roles. He served as interior minister from 1981, having been appointed by General Leopoldo Galtieri.

== President of Argentina ==
He briefly served as President of Argentina from 18 June 1982 to 1 July 1982, during a period of military rule, after Galtieri was ousted from office owing to the country's humiliating defeat by the British in the Falklands War.

=== Succession ===
Saint-Jean's brief period as president in June and July 1982 ended when he was succeeded by General Reynaldo Bignone.

== See also ==
- National Reorganization Process

Political offices
Preceded by Leopoldo Galtieri	President of Argentina; 1982	Succeeded by Reynaldo Bignone
