= National Commission on the Disappearance of Persons =

Argentine organization during the Reorganization Process

National Commission on the Disappearance of Persons (Spanish: Comisión Nacional sobre la Desaparición de Personas, CONADEP) was an Argentine organization created by President Raúl Alfonsín on 15 December 1983, shortly after his inauguration, to investigate the fate of the desaparecidos (victims of forced disappearance) and other human rights violations (see: Dirty War) performed during the military dictatorship known as the National Reorganization Process between 1976 and 1983.

The research of the investigation commission was documented in the Nunca Más (Never Again) report, which was a complete summary published as an official report in Spanish, and delivered to Alfonsín on 20 September 1984, which opened the doors to the trial of the military juntas of the dictatorship. CONADEP recorded the forced disappearance of 8,961 persons from 1976 to 1983, although it noted that the actual number could be higher (estimates by human rights organizations usually place it at 30,000 persons). The report also stated that about 600 people were "disappeared" and 458 were assassinated (by death squads such as the Argentine Anticommunist Alliance) during the Peronist governments from 1973 to 1976.

== History of the disappearances ==
Military intervention in the political sphere was common in Argentina since the 1930s. Torture and violence were used as mechanisms to control political conflicts or to deter the actions of opposition. But, the implementation of forced disappearances began to be prevalent following the 1976 Argentine coup d'état, displaying a determination to eliminate opposition with a more hidden method.

The dictators denied any involvement in the disappearances and used Centros clandestinos de detención (Clandestine Detention Centers) to place the disappeared. They were similar to the prisons of Argentina in regards to condition and structure but the detention centers could deny if a captive was being retained there. This gave the captors more freedom for torture or to kill the captives. Most disappeared people were eventually murdered and their bodies were either buried in unmarked graves, incinerated or disposed into the sea. These hidden methods kept the Argentine government from being susceptible to international scrutiny and allowed the murder and torture of anyone without someone having to be held accountable to explain for the actions.

Relatives of the disappeared for many years following the abductions demanded solely for truth about the fate of the disappeared. Over 5,000 reports were filed from Argentina to the La asamblea permanente por los derechos humanos (Permanent Assembly for Human Rights, APDH) and thousands of complaints were submitted to the Organization of American States, Inter-American Commission on Human Rights (IACHR), the International Committee of the Red Cross, the UN Human Rights Division, Amnesty International and organizations with various religious affiliations. These reports promoted visits from both Amnesty International and IACHR, but the dictatorship succeeded in denying the charges until the Falklands War in June 1982 and Argentina's defeat.

Following this defeat, widespread coverage of the charges against the Argentine dictatorship spread through the press causing civil society organizations to demand that the parties responsible for the disappearances be brought forth and charged. A popular slogan used by these organizations was "juicio y castigo a los culpables" (trial and punishment for the perpetrators).

In April 1983, the dictatorship published the "Final Document of the Military Junta on the War against Subversion" in which the military argues that the acts that they committed were under the orders of the then president, Isabel Perón, in which she ordered them to "annihilate subversion". In September 1983, the regime then passed the "National Pacification Act" that granted impunity to the state by saying that all the action that was a result of the "anti-subversive war" was then "extinguished". This act prompted human rights organizations to demand that a commission would be formed by the government with the task of investigating state "terrorism". The demands also included that the commission would include members from the House and the Congress and be advised by the human rights community.

== Creation of CONADEP ==
CONADEP was created by Raúl Alfonsín who was the candidate for the Unión Cívica Radical (Radical Civic Union) party and took office as president on 10 December 1983. He emphasized that to prosecute the guilty parties responsible for the disappearances that three categories of people would have to be distinguished: those who planned and issued the orders, those who acted beyond the orders and those who carried out the orders strictly to the letter.

Alfonsín proposed to take away the "self-amnesty" law that had been implemented by the military regime and ordered for the prosecution of seven guerilla leaders and the first three military juntas of the dictatorship. But, Alfonsín wanted to hold the trials in military court, with the possibility of an appeal in a civilian court. Human rights groups disagreed with this and though that the military courts would refuse to impose any legal sanctions on the prosecuted and believed that the only way to see justice was to have a "bicameral commission". This way, the commission could manage an inquiry and then deliver a sentence and be able to subpoena testimony. Alfonsín denied the idea of a "bicameral commission" because of concern that legislators would compete among themselves to give the harshest punishments. Alfonsín also wanted to integrate the military into the democratic party to prevent further military coups so he wanted to be slightly more conciliatory.

Ernesto Sábato, Eduardo Rabossi, Gregorio Klimovsky, Hilario Fernández Long, Marshall Meyer, Ricardo Colombres, Monsignor Jaime de Nevares, Magdalena Ruiz Guiñazú, René Favaloro, and Carlos Gattinoni were all invited to join the Commission. CONADEP was created on December 15, 1983 by a presidential decree and was to report to both the executive branch and the legislators from both chambers. It was allotted six months time to collect reports about the disappearances, look to see if they could discover what happened to the disappeared, find abducted children, find evidence of attempts to conceal crimes and destroy evidence, after which they would refer this information to the court and issue a final report.

Although the decree was passed, only three Radical Party Congressmen and one human rights group, APDH, participated in CONADEP because human rights groups did not think that CONADEP would be successful. They felt that only a bicameral commission had the power of coercion necessary to subpoena the military and political offenders. After the military failed to make a "good faith" effort with the prosecution, the trials were then transferred to a civilian court.

== Actions of CONADEP ==
After the creation of CONADEP, the commission asked APDH for all the reports of disappearances that they had gathered during the Dirty War, and at the same time invited APDH member, Graciela Fernández Meijide, to be the head of the Secretaría de Denuncias (Department of Depositions). Meijide accepted and then asked human rights organizations to volunteer their activists. CONADEP then began collaborating with many other organizations. Abuelas de Plaza de Mayo (Grandmothers of Plaza de Mayo) met with CONADEP in order to coordinate a search for the still missing children, Familiares de Detenidos y Desaparecidos por Razones Políticas (Relatives of the Detained-Disappeared) and the Liga Argentina por los Derechos del Hombre (Argentine Human Rights League, or LADH) also asked their members to give testimonies to CONADEP. Movimiento Ecuménico por los Derechos Humanos (Ecumenical Movement for Human Rights, or MEDH) provided CONADEP with personnel.

CONADEP then formed a Technical Commission on the Gathering of Information that was responsible for gathering and systematizing information collected on the disappeared, the people thought to be responsible, and the clandestine detention centers which would then be sent back to CONADEP. In the summer of 1984, relatives of the disappeared and survivors collected at the Centro Cultural San Martín in Buenos Aires at the location of the CONADEP headquarters in order to give their testimonies.

During the collection of the testimonies, which would soon be concentrated and organized into the Nunca Más report, CONADEP decided the most effective way to prosecute the ones thought to be responsible, would be to identify the people they though were guilty and have them explain the events in court. CONADEP asked the president to prohibit those accused of leaving the country and this was approved.

== Nunca Más report ==
The Nunca Más ("Never Again") report was the main report created by CONADEP. Within its 50,000 pages of depositions from the survivors of the disappearances, it contains detailed accounts of the treatment by the Argentine armed forces towards the captives, or the disappeared, of the Dirty War. The report contains descriptions of individual cases of people being tortured or killed.

The reports explains how CONADEP was successful in identifying 300 secret detention centers throughout Argentina used during the Dirty War that were administered by the military and documenting 8,961 deaths and disappearances from 1976–1977. It also gave evidence that the inquiries made by CONADEP helped to find many of the mass burial sites around Argentina that were used to bury the disappeared. The report contained an analysis of the social and class backgrounds of the disappeared, giving statistics about the people that were kidnapped. For example, the report concluded that about 30% of the disappeared were women and that no less than 200 children under 15 were kidnapped.

The Nunca Más report is a bestseller in Argentina and has been continuously in print since 1984. Part of the prologue by Ernesto Sábato was refactored in 2006 by the Kirchner administration. The prologue was restored to the original form in 2016, once the Kirchners ended their term of office.

== Achievements ==
In February 1984, CONADEP found a mass grave in San Vincent Cemetery in Córdoba, Argentina, that at the time of discovery, was the largest mass grave discovered in Argentina since human rights organizations began to oppose the secret burial of victims during the military repression in Argentina during 1982. The Commission procured a copy of the city morgue ledger that listed around 700 people whose bodies passed through the morgue during the years following the military coup in 1976. The ledger contained descriptions of the conditions of the body. Ernesto Sabato, the president of CONADEP, was quoted as having said that "the tortures and torments and bullets holes from the firing squad" were all described in the ledger.

CONADEP has also had success in the scope of their influence. Some people who approve of the work of CONADEP say that it started the "justice cascade" trend which is the implementation of new norms and practices that provide more accountability for human rights violations.

== CONADEP's members ==
- Ernesto Sábato (President)
- Ricardo Colombres
- René Favaloro
- Hilario Fernández Long
- Carlos T. Gattinoni
- Gregorio Klimovsky
- Marshall Meyer
- Jaime F. de Nevares
- Eduardo Rabossi
- Magdalena Ruiz Guiñazú
- Santiago Marcelino López (1)
- Hugo Diógenes Piucill (1)
- Horacio Hugo Huarte (1)

(1) designated by the Chamber of Deputies.

Five secretaries were also named:

- Graciela Fernández Meijide: Depositions
- Daniel Salvador: Documentation and Data Processing
- Raúl Aragón: Procedures
- Alberto Mansur: Legal Affairs
- Leopoldo Silgueira: Administrative

== See also ==
- Archivo Nacional de la Memoria
- Batallón de Inteligencia 601
- Brasil: Nunca Mais
- Grandmothers of the Plaza de Mayo
- List of truth and reconciliation commissions
- Mothers of the Plaza de Mayo
- Nacht und Nebel
- Torture during the Algerian War
