= Carlos Lacoste =

45th President of Argentina

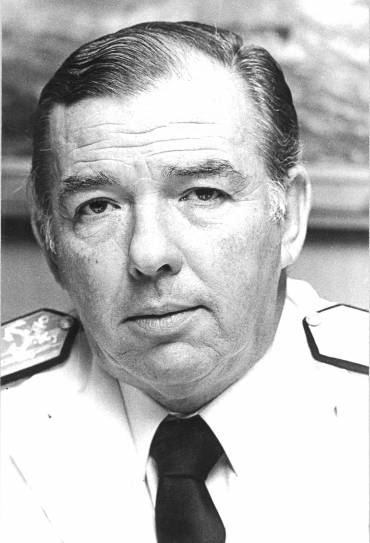
- Carlos Lacoste (c. 1978–1993)

45th President of Argentina
- Interim; 11 December 1981 – 22 December 1981
- Appointed by: National Reorganization Process
- Vice President: None
- Preceded by: Horacio Tomás Liendo (acting)
- Succeeded by: Leopoldo Galtieri

Personal details
- Born: 2 February 1929 Buenos Aires, Argentina
- Died: 24 June 2004 (aged 75) Buenos Aires, Argentina
- Spouse: Hebe Angélica Aprile
- Profession: Military
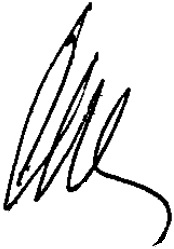
- Signature

Carlos Alberto Lacoste (2 February 1929 – 24 June 2004) was an Argentine naval officer and politician who briefly served as the interim President of Argentina in December 1981.

== Career ==
While serving as a vice-admiral in the Navy, Lacoste was influential in the organization of the 1978 FIFA World Cup, hosted by Argentina.

In December 1981 the then head of state General Roberto Eduardo Viola was ousted in a coup d'état. Lacoste served as interim President of Argentina from 11 to 22 December 1981, during a period of military rule. He was succeeded in the presidential office by Lieutenant General Leopoldo Galtieri. After the military government, he preserved his connections with football associations, becoming a South American representative in FIFA, and in 1986 he was assigned as Argentine supervisor in the drawing of that year's World Cup matches in Mexico, which was eventually won by Argentina. He died on 24 June 2004 at the age of 75.

== See also ==
- National Reorganization Process

Political offices
Preceded by Roberto Viola	President of Argentina; 1981	Succeeded by Leopoldo Galtieri
