= Reynaldo Bignone =

President of Argentina from 1982 to 1983

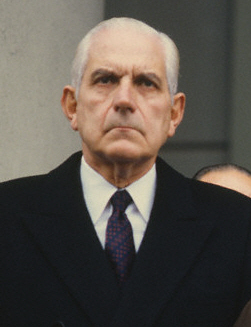
- Bignone during a military parade, 1982

48th President of Argentina
- In office 1 July 1982 – 10 December 1983
- Appointed by: Military junta
- Vice President: None
- Preceded by: Alfredo Oscar Saint Jean (interim)
- Succeeded by: Raúl Alfonsín

Personal details
- Born: Reynaldo Benito Antonio Bignone; 21 January 1928 Morón, Argentina
- Died: 7 March 2018 (aged 90) Buenos Aires, Argentina
- Spouse: Nilda Raquel Belén (m. 1953; died 2013)
- Children: Cristina Raquel; Mabel Beatriz; Carlos Daniel
- Profession: Military
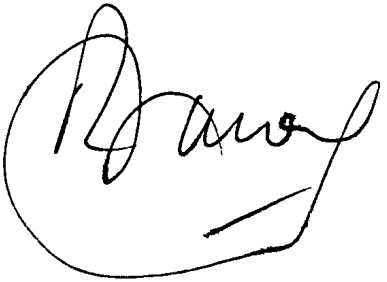
- Signature

Military service
- Allegiance: Argentina
- Branch/service: Argentine Army
- Years of service: 1947–1981
- Rank: Division general (pre-1991 epaulette)

Reynaldo Benito Antonio Bignone (21 January 1928 – 7 March 2018) was an Argentine general who served as the de facto President of Argentina from 1 July 1982 to 10 December 1983, the last president to serve under the National Reorganization Process. In 2010, he was sentenced to 25 years in prison for his role in the kidnapping, torture, and murder of persons suspected of opposing the government during the Dirty War, and would receive additional convictions and eventually a life sentence in the time afterwards as well.

He ordered the destruction of all documentation on the disappeared.

== Early life and family ==
Bignone was born in 1928 in Morón, which today is part of the Greater Buenos Aires area. His parents were Adelaida María (née Ramayón), of Gibraltarian and French descent, and Reynaldo René Bignone, of Italian and German descent. He joined the Army Infantry at age 19. He studied at the Superior School of War and in Francoist Spain before being appointed head of the VI Infantry Regiment in 1964.

He was married to Nilda Raquel Belén Etcheverry, who died in 2013. The couple had three children.

== Presidency ==
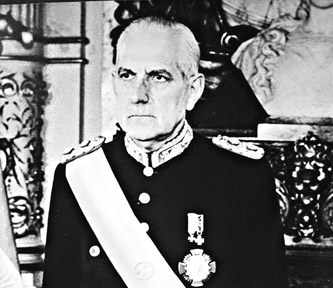
Bignone, in military attire at the Casa Rosada.

He was President of Argentina appointed by the military junta from July 1982 to December 1983, when democracy returned to Argentina.

Uncomfortable with the media, Bignone's press statements left doubts as to whether there would be an imminent call for elections.

His loosening of certain free speech restrictions also put his regime's unpopularity in evidence and the newsstands brimmed with satirical publications. Humor had its January 1983 issue confiscated after Army Chief of Staff General Cristino Nicolaides objected to caricaturist Andrés Cascioli's portrayals of the junta.

=== Economic policy ===
Bignone chose Domingo Cavallo to head the Argentine Central Bank and Jose Maria Dagnino Pastore a liberal as Economy Minister. While Pastore was a liberal, he wanted to move away from free market economic policies and wanted to adopt protectionist economic policies like it was at the time of Ramón Castillo, Arturo Rawson, Pedro Pablo Ramírez and Edelmiro Julián Farrell. Cavallo inherited a foreign debt installment guarantee program that shielded billions of private debt from the collapse of the peso, costing the treasury billions. He instituted controls over the facility, such as the indexation of payments, but this move and the rescission of Circular 1050 threw the banking sector against him; Cavallo and Dagnino Pastore were replaced in August.

Bignone's new president of the Central Bank, Julio González del Solar, undid many of these controls, transferring billions more in private foreign debt to the Central Bank, though he stopped short of reinstating the hated "1050."

Six years of intermittent wage freezes had left real wages close to 40% lower than during Perón's tenure, leading to growing labor unrest. Bignone's decision to restore limited rights of speech and assembly, including the right to strike, led to increased strike activity. Saúl Ubaldini, the new leader of the reinstated CGT, Argentina's largest labor union, was particularly active. Bignone's new Economy Minister, Jorge Wehbe, a banking executive with previous experience in the post, reluctantly granted two large, mandatory wage increases in late 1982. On September 13, 1982, Economy Minister Jorge Wehbe launched a "price controls" that "put the products of 675 companies under government control" due to "the need to "protect real wages," threatened by a "monopolistic industrial structure." Calls for immediate elections led, likewise, to frequent demonstrations at the President's executive offices, the Casa Rosada. One such protest, on 16 December, led to the death of a demonstrator.

=== Democratic way out ===
Drawing a contrast between his position and the lukewarm reproach by others in his own party and in other parties, Raúl Alfonsín, the head of the centrist UCR's progressive wing who had also opposed the Falklands War when few others in Argentina did, earned his party's nomination in July. The convention was called only days after Bignone publicly announced the scheduling of elections (to be held on 30 October, three months after the announcement). The UCR's only important opposition, the Justicialist (Peronist) Party, was hamstrung by voters' memories of President Isabel Perón's two years in office and by internal friction that dragged their nominating process on by nearly two months.

The Argentine economy, which had recovered modestly following the July 1982 cancellation of prevailing wage freezes and the rescission of Circular 1050, was saddled with foreign debt interest payments of over US$4 billion, capital flight, budget deficits around 10% of GDP and a resulting rise in inflation: rising to 200% in 1982, it approached 400% in 1983. Economy Minister Jorge Wehbe released a new currency in June, the peso argentino, to replace the worthless peso ley at 10,000 to one. This move secured him concessions from international creditors, but did not slow inflation, and the economy slipped back into recession during the second half of 1983.

Careful to avoid the appearance of endorsement of any one candidate (a mistake made by a previous dictator, General Pedro Aramburu, in 1958), Bignone oversaw the shredding of documents and other face-saving measures, such as generous new wage guidelines. The economy, which had contracted by around 12% in the eighteen months before he took office, managed a recovery of around 4% during Bignone's eighteen-month term. Following a brief, though intense campaign and tight polls, election night resulted in a 12-point margin for the UCR's Alfonsín over Justicialist nominee Ítalo Lúder. Tied to repressive measures he signed in 1975, he could not avoid suspicion of a gentleman's agreement with Bignone for the sake of preventing future investigations.

== Later life ==
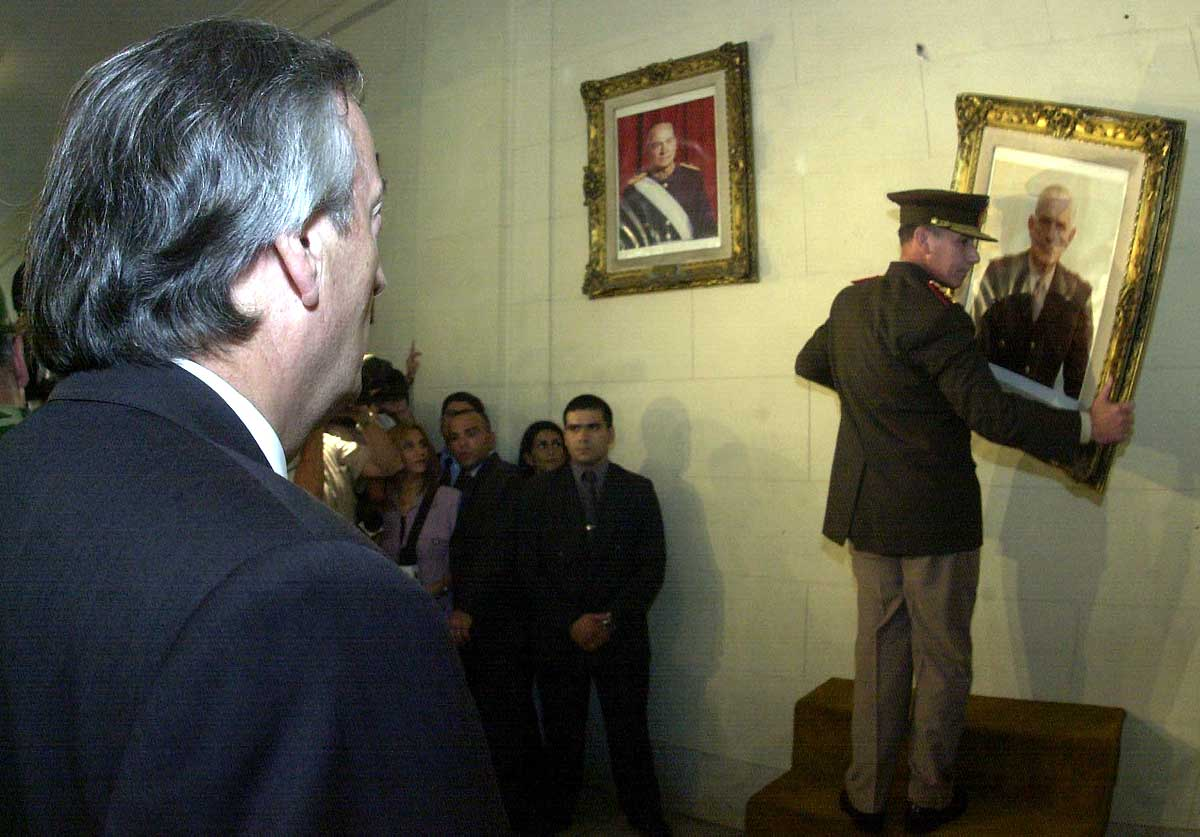
President Néstor Kirchner had Bignone's portrait removed in August 2004 from the National War College, which the general had directed in the 1960s

Presiding over a difficult six years, President Raúl Alfonsín advanced the Trial of the Juntas in 1985, proceedings which acquitted Bignone of responsibility, but left open the possibility of civil trials against him. These, however, were precluded by decrees signed by Alfonsín himself in early 1987, the result of pressure from the Armed Forces.

Bignone published a memoir about his brief tenure, El último de facto (2003). It was condemned for his marginalizing of Dirty War abuses. In January 1999, the courts reopened trials related to the taking of children from disappeared women and placing them in families with ties to the government. In 2003 people in Argentina were outraged by comments of Bignone and two other generals defending their actions during the Dirty War, expressed in the film documentary, Escadrons de la mort: l'ecole francaise (2003); this was directed by French journalist and filmmaker Marie-Monique Robin. President Nestor Kirchner "ordered the military to bring charges against the three for justifying the crimes of the dictatorship."

=== Convictions and imprisonment ===
Bignone was granted house arrest in October 2006, given his advanced age. He was arrested in March 2007 and taken into custody at a military base outside Buenos Aires as part of an investigation into past human rights abuses, including the atrocities at the Posadas Hospital and trafficking of infants born to and abducted from the roughly 500 pregnant women who were among the disappeared. These were ruled to have no statute of limitations owing their nature as crimes against humanity.

On 20 April 2010, Bignone was sentenced to 25 years in prison for his involvement in the kidnapping, torture and murder of 56 people, including guerrilla fighters, at the extermination center operating in the Campo de Mayo military complex. Following this sentence, Bignone was reported to have been jailed. On 14 April 2011, Bignone was sentenced to life in prison for crimes against humanity.

On 29 December 2011 Bignone received an additional 15-year prison sentence for crimes against humanity for setting up a secret torture center inside a hospital during the 1976 military coup. On 5 July 2012, Bignone was sentenced to 15 years in prison for his participation in a scheme to steal babies from parents detained by the military regime and place them with friends of the regime. According to the court decision, Bignone was an accomplice "in the crimes of theft, retention and hiding of minors, as well as replacing their identities." On 27 May 2016, Bignone was convicted for his role in Operation Condor, which included the murders of 105 people, among them 45 Uruguayans, 22 Chileans, 13 Paraguayans and 11 Bolivians living in exile. He was sentenced to 20 years in prison. Following this sentence, it was again reported that Bignone had been jailed. In 2017, Bigone's sentence was increased to life imprisonment, which he was still serving at the time of his death in March 2018.

== Death ==
Bignone died of congestive heart failure in Buenos Aires on the morning of 7 March 2018 at the age of 90; he had recently been admitted to the military hospital with a hip fracture.

Political offices
Preceded by Alfredo Saint-Jean	President of Argentina; 1982–1983	Succeeded by Raúl Alfonsín
