= National Archive of Remembrance =

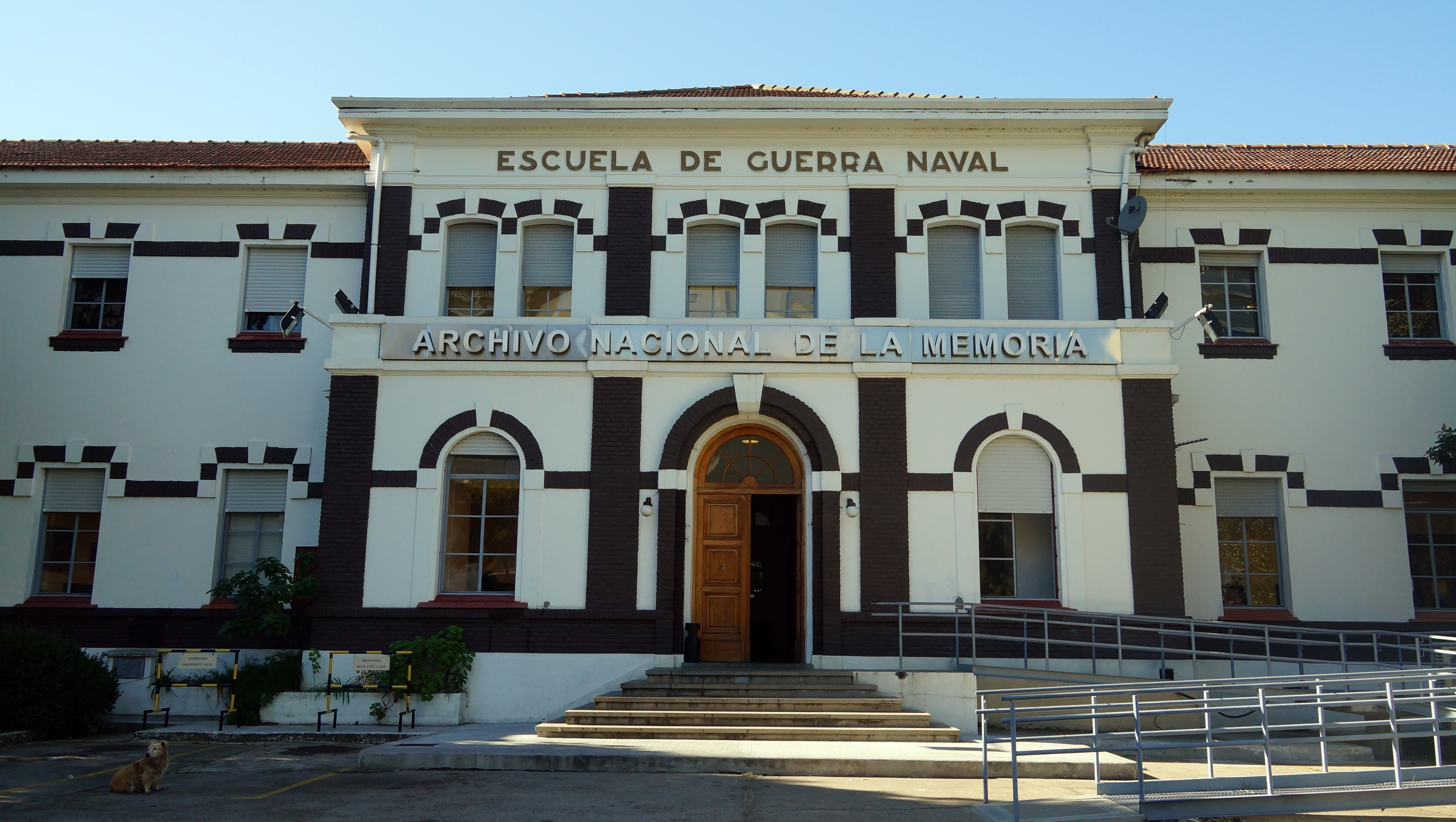
National Archive of Remembrance building in 2013

The National Archive of Remembrance (Archivo Nacional de la Memoria) is an archive set up by decree 1259/2003 of the president of Argentina Néstor Kirchner on 16 December 2003 to obtain and process data pertaining to human rights violations by the Argentine State, referring to events of the illegal dirty war of 1976 to 1983 waged by the state on those it perceived as its enemies.

== See also ==
- Batallón de Inteligencia 601
- National Commission on the Disappearance of Persons
