= Equipo Nizkor =

Equipo Nizkor (from the Hebrew נִזְכּוֹר, "we will remember") is a human rights NGO concerned mostly about events in Latin America, but also Europe. It is affiliated with Derechos Human Rights, Serpaj Europe and the Global Internet Liberty Campaign (GILC). It also works with the World Organization Against Torture.

It has published many articles concerning the "Dirty War" in the Southern Cone and Operation Condor.

Equipo Nizkor's website Derechos.org provides up-to-date information on current international threats to human rights. According to Equipo Nizkor, it is the spread of information that is the first step fight human rights violations. The website publishes articles about current international relations regarding nuclear threats, drug wars, human trafficking, food crises, international law, privacy and counterintelligence and much more.

== See also ==
- Terror archives
