= Batallón de Inteligencia 601 =

Intelligence service of the Argentine Army

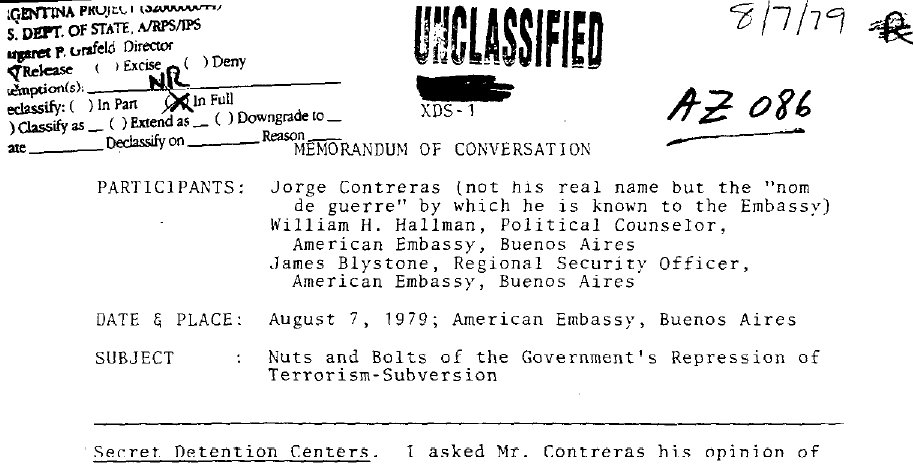
August 7, 1979 US embassy in Argentina Memorandum of the conversation with "Jorge Contreras", director of Task Force 7 of the "Reunion Central" section of the 601 Intelligence Battalion, which gathered members from all parts of the Argentine Armed Forces. Subject: "Nuts and Bolts of the Government's Repression of Terrorism-Subversion. Original document on the US National Security Archives' website. According to the National Security Archive, the junta led by Jorge Rafael Videla had United States' approval for its all-out assault on the left in the name of "national security doctrine". The U.S. Embassy in Buenos Aires complained to Washington that the Argentine officers were "euphoric" over signals from high-ranking U.S. officials, including Secretary of State Henry Kissinger.

The Batallón de Inteligencia 601 (Spanish for "601st Intelligence Battalion") was a special military intelligence service of the Argentine Army whose structure was set up in the late 1970s, active in the Dirty War and Operation Condor, and disbanded in 2000. Its personnel infiltrated and collected information on guerrilla groups and human rights organisations; and coordinated killings, kidnappings and other abuses.

The Batallón was under the orders of Guillermo Suárez Mason and ultimately reported to junta leader Leopoldo Galtieri. The unit took part in Luis García Meza Tejada's Cocaine Coup in Bolivia in 1980 and trained Contra units in Lepaterique base in Honduras in the 1980s. It also trained members of the Honduran Battalion 316.

Army officers who joined Batallón de Inteligencia 601 were more likely to be underperformers relative to other Army officers. They were less likely to have advanced training, more likely to be stuck in middling ranks, and faced a higher risk of discharge than their peers. After joining the Batallón, the officers experienced a career boost, enabling them to climb up the ranks quicker and outlast their better peers.

== Declassification of documents ==
On 1 January 2010, President Cristina Fernández of Argentina ordered that documents pertaining to Batallón 601 be declassified. The documents presented before federal Judge Ariel Lijo contain data on 3,952 civilians, from university professors to concierges, and 345 army personnel who worked for Battalion 601, according to the director of the National Archive of Memory.

== See also ==
- Agustín Feced
- Archivo Nacional de la Memoria
- Argentine Army
- Dirty War
- National Commission on the Disappearance of Persons
- Operation Charly
- Operation Condor
- Army Intelligence Service
