= Lepaterique =

- Municipality
- Location in Honduras
- Coordinates: 14°4′0″N 87°28′0″W
- Country: Honduras
- Department: Francisco Morazán

Area
  - Total: 541 km^{2} (209 sq mi)

Population (2015)
  - Total: 20,741
  - Density: 38.3/km^{2} (99.3/sq mi)

Lepaterique is a municipality in the Honduran department of Francisco Morazán.

== Military base ==
A military base located in Lepaterique was used during the 1980s by the Contras and by the Argentine 601 Intelligence Battalion, which was involved in Operation Condor.

In August 2005, Honduran media revealed that Triple Canopy, Inc., a private military contractor, was using the base to train mercenaries before they were sent on mission in Iraq.
