= Santiago Omar Riveros =

Argentinian military officer and criminal (1923–2024)

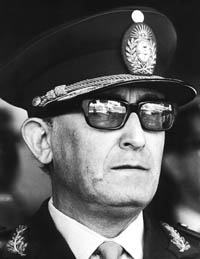
- Riveros in the 1970s
- Born: 4 August 1923; Villa Dolores, Córdoba, Argentina
- Died: 24 May 2024 (aged 100) Buenos Aires, Argentina
- Allegiance: Argentina
- Branch: Argentine Army
- Service years: 1944–1980
- Rank: (pre-1991 epaulette) Divisional general
- Commands: Comando de Institutos Militares (1976–1978), Campo de Mayo Garrison, Defence Zone IV
- Known for: Crimes against humanity
- Conflicts: none
- Alma mater: Colegio Militar de la Nación
- Children: 2
- Other work: Ambassador of Argentina to Uruguay
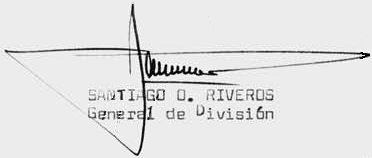
- Signature

Santiago Omar Riveros (Spanish pronunciation: [sanˈtjaɣo oˈmar riˈβeɾos]; 4 August 1923 – 24 May 2024) was an Argentinian military officer who served in the Argentine Army, in which he bore the rank of divisional general and between 1976 and 1978 held the post of Commander of Military Institutes (Comandante de Institutos Militares) during Argentina's so-called Dirty War in the 1970s and 1980s, waged by the self-styled "National Reorganization Process" (Spanish: Proceso de Reorganización Nacional), which was in fact a military dictatorship. Riveros played a prominent role during the dictatorship's repression, for which he later faced proceedings in which he was found guilty and sentenced for crimes against humanity. At the time of his death at the age of 100, Riveros was still serving his sentence at his home.

== Family ==
Riveros was born on 4 August 1923 in Villa Dolores, a small city in the province of Córdoba, to parents Arturo Riveros and María Ester Castro. Riveros was married and was father to two children.

== Military career ==
=== Early years ===
Riveros entered the Colegio Militar de la Nación as a first-year cadet on 1 February 1943, after having finished secondary school. He left as an artillery gun sub-lieutenant on 14 December 1945, having graduated fifth out of a class of 201. Years later, he trained to be a General Staff Officer at the Escuela Superior de Guerra, which in time afforded him a path into the army's highest levels. Among those who had recently graduated from class 74, of which Riveros was a member, were Sub-lieutenants Albano Eduardo Harguindeguy, Carlos Enrique Laidlaw, Leopoldo Fortunato Galtieri, Otto Carlos Paladino, Ramón Genaro Díaz Bessone and Luciano Benjamín Menéndez, who fulfilled various functions of central relevance during the Dirty War and its de facto governments.

=== The Dirty War ===
During Argentina's last military dictatorship (beginning in March 1976), General Riveros held the positions of Commander of Military Institutes, Head of the Campo de Mayo Garrison and head of Defence Zone IV. Under his responsibility were Campo de Mayo and a group of partidos of Buenos Aires Province. His second commander and chief of staff were, first Brigade General Fernando Humberto Santiago (1976), and then later Brigade General Reynaldo Benito Antonio Bignone (1977-1978).

It was right at Campo de Mayo where secret detention centres such as El Campito ("The Little Field"), Las Casitas ("The Little Houses"), the base's Military Hospital and its Military Prison for Defendants went about their clandestine activities while Riveros was busy reviewing the garrison there.

At the Military Hospital (HMCM), forces who were at the very centre of the Dirty War's repression went about the commission of various crimes such as clandestine births and taking young children away from desaparecidas (women detainees who went missing during the Dirty War).

Among those in the military's upper echelons were groups known as "los duros" ("the hard ones"), among whom were Ramón Genaro Díaz Bessone, Luciano Benjamín Menéndez and Guillermo Suárez Mason, and "los blandos" ("the soft ones"), among whom were Jorge Rafael Videla and Roberto Eduardo Viola. These two were, of course, opposed to each other. Riveros joined the former, which was in alignment with José Alfredo Martínez de Hoz's economic policies and more inclined to establish dialogues with political sectors.

On 2 February 1979, Riveros relieved Vice-Admiral Luís María Mendía of his positions as Chief of the Argentine Military Delegation before the Inter-American Defense Board, Armed Forces' Adviser at the Permanent Mission of the Argentine Republic to the United Nations, and also at the Permanent Mission of the Argentine Republic to the Organization of American States.

He then simultaneously exercised all these functions himself until 30 January 1980, after which he withdrew from them and went into effective retirement.

==== Ambassador to Uruguay ====
Once Divisional General Riveros had gone into retirement in January 1980 and no longer bore his military title, Roberto Eduardo Viola's government appointed him Argentina's ambassador to Uruguay on 26 June 1981. There he was supported by the former head of the Naval Intelligence Service, Captain Eduardo Osvaldo Invierno, who served as Naval Military Attaché in the Oriental Republic of Uruguay beginning on 15 January 1980. Riveros retained this ambassadorial post under both Leopoldo Fortunato Galtieri's and Reynaldo Benito Antonio Bignone's de facto presidencies, until 10 December 1983, when he was dismissed from his diplomatic functions by the incoming, newly elected constitutional president, Dr. Raúl Ricardo Alfonsín, who named former vice-president Dr. Carlos Humberto Perette as Riveros's replacement.

== Legal situation ==
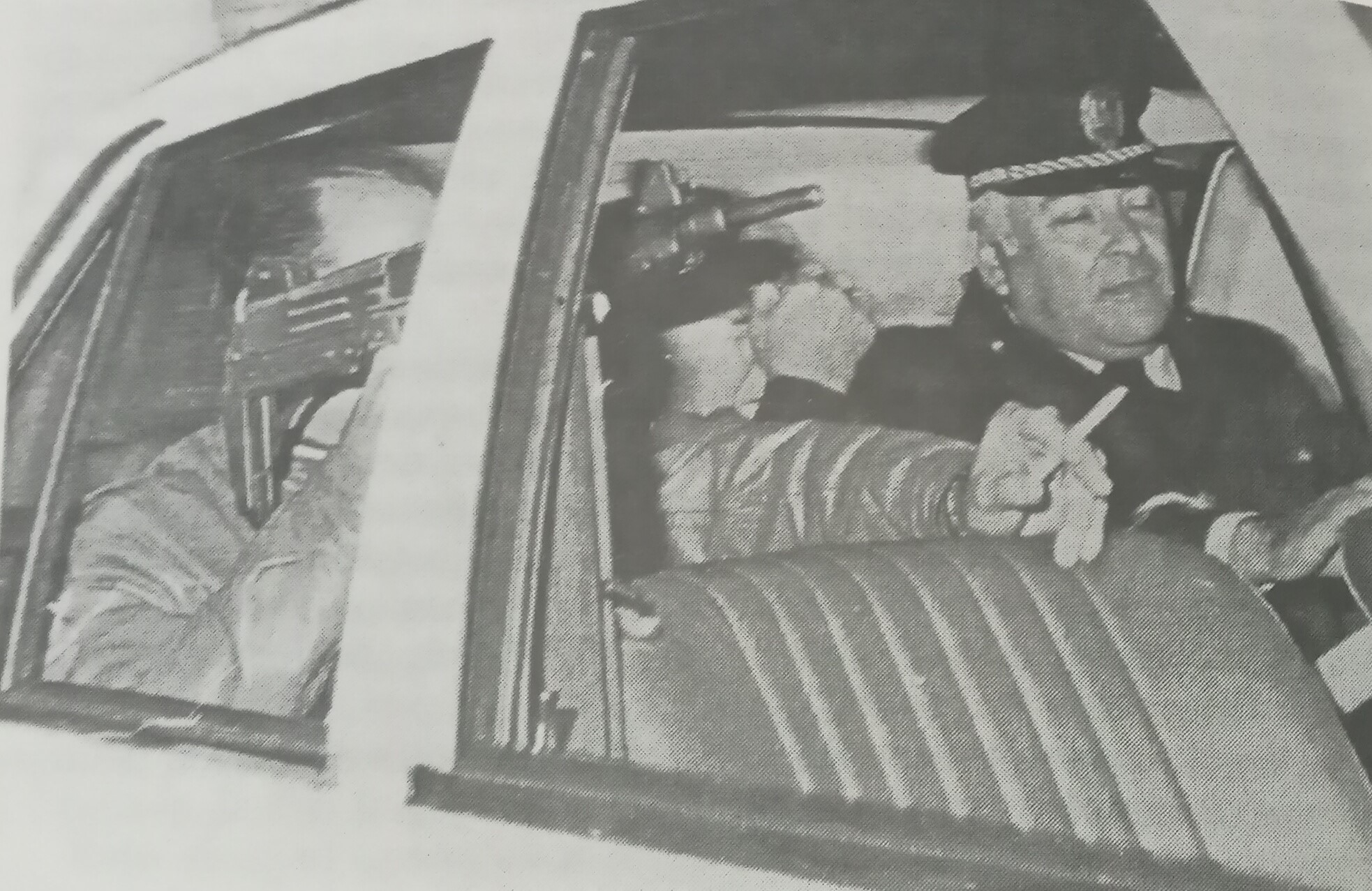
Riveros (centre), in police custody, leaving the San Isidro courthouse in 1985.

In 1989, Riveros was the recipient of a pardon granted by President Carlos Saúl Menem through Decree no. 1002 of 6 October of that year. He remained exempt from any penalty for the crimes against humanity of which he had been found guilty in 1985.

He was the first military officer to explain his own role during Argentina's state terrorism (the Dirty War), putting together a lengthy document in which he stated, among other things:

There have not been any desaparecidos (missing persons), but rather terrorists annihilated within the framework of a revolutionary and therefore irregular war.

— Santiago Omar Riveros

=== Convictions and imprisonment ===
In Italy, Riveros was sentenced to life imprisonment and 18 months' solitary confinement in 2000 for the disappearance and death of three Italian citizens.

In 2006, Riveros found himself being tried for crimes against humanity in relation to matters such as Operation Condor. That same year, the Argentine courts decided that the pardon that had been bestowed upon Riveros was unconstitutional. Eventually, on 13 July 2007, the Supreme Court of Argentina quashed the pardons that had been protecting Riveros and furthermore ruled that all such pardons were unconstitutional.

On 12 August 2009, Riveros was found guilty in the murder of fifteen-year-old Young Communist militant Floreal Avellaneda, who had been kidnapped on 15 April 1976, and tortured at the Villa Martelli police station and then at Campo de Mayo, together with his mother. His body was found months later over on Uruguay's coast, bound hand and foot, with obvious signs of both torture and impalement. The judges, Lucila Larrandart, Martha Milloc and Héctor Sagretti, of the San Martín Tribunal Oral convicted Riveros of the crimes of unlawfully depriving persons of freedom, aggravated by violence, trespassing, theft, acts of torture aggravated by victims being the targets of political persecution, aggravated homicide and hiding a body. The bench handed down a life sentence to be served in the Federal Penitentiary Service (Spanish: Servicio Penitenciario Federal). Five of Riveros's underlings were judged together with him for these crimes perpetrated at Campo de Mayo, and they were given sentences of between 8 and 25 years. The judges determined that Floreal Avellaneda's killing constituted a crime against humanity, but set aside any contention that it had been part of a genocide.

On 5 July 2012, within the framework of the "Plan Sistemático", the Federal Tribual Oral no. 6 of the Federal Capital imposed a 20-year prison sentence on Riveros for "kidnapping, retaining and hiding a ten-year-old minor in conjunction with making the status of a minor under ten years of age uncertain" in two acts. Sentenced alongside Riveros were Jorge Rafael Videla and Reynaldo Benito Antonio Bignone.

In July 2022, he received a further sentence for crimes against humanity committed at Campo de Mayo. However, he served his sentence at home, under house arrest, rather than in a prison cell.

== Death ==
Riveros died in Buenos Aires on 24 May 2024, at the age of 100.

== See also ==
- Human rights
- National Reorganization Process
- Juicios por delitos de lesa humanidad en Argentina (List of judgements against those found guilty of crimes against humanity in Argentina) (in Spanish)
- Anexo:Sentencias de juicios por delitos de lesa humanidad en Argentina (List of judges' sentences for crimes against humanity in Argentina) (in Spanish)
