= Dirty War =

Argentinian theatre of the Cold War, from 1976 to 1983

- Part of the Cold War and Operation Condor
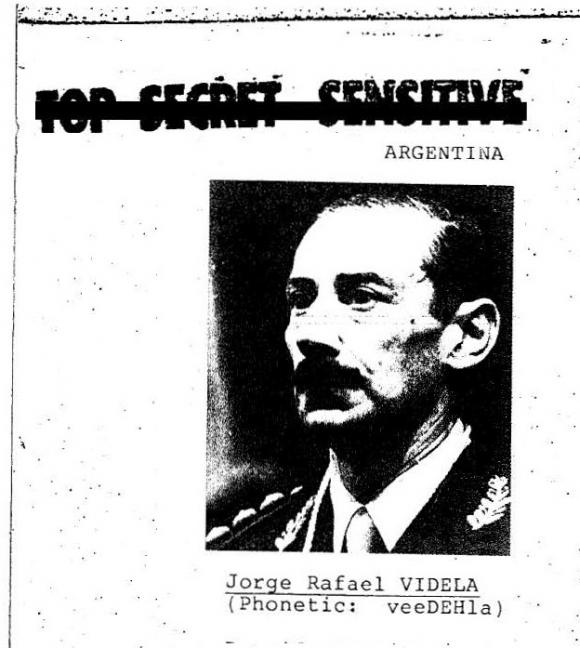
- An image of Jorge Rafael Videla inside a dossier by the U.S. Government
Date	19 January 1974 – 10 December 1983 (9 years, 10 months and 3 weeks)
Location	Argentina
Result	Operation Independence; 1976 Argentine coup d'état; Dictatorship of National Reorganization Process; Operation was concluded after the Falklands War

Belligerents
Argentina; Argentine Army; Argentine Navy; Argentine Air Force; Secretariat of Intelligence; Argentine Federal Police; Argentine National Gendarmerie; Argentine Naval Prefecture; Argentine Anticommunist Alliance; Justicialist Party (Right-wing faction); Supported by: United States; Bolivia; Brazil; Chile; Paraguay; Uruguay	ERP (1973–1979); Montoneros (1974–1980); Resistencia Libertaria Supported by: Cuba

Commanders and leaders
3rd Peronist Government: (Argentina) Juan Domingo Perón; (Argentina) José López Rega; (Argentina) Isabel Perón National Reorganization Process (Argentina) Jorge Rafael Videla; (Argentina) Emilio Eduardo Massera; (Argentina) Orlando Ramón Agosti; (Argentina) Roberto Eduardo Viola; (Argentina) Carlos Lacoste; (Argentina) Leopoldo Galtieri	Various guerrilla leaders and civil society leaders

Casualties and losses
539 military and police forces killed 1,355 civilians killed by guerrillas 5,000 military and police wounded	Montoneros 5,000 members killed ERP 5,000 members killed. RL 8 killed
- 13,000–30,000 killed or disappeared

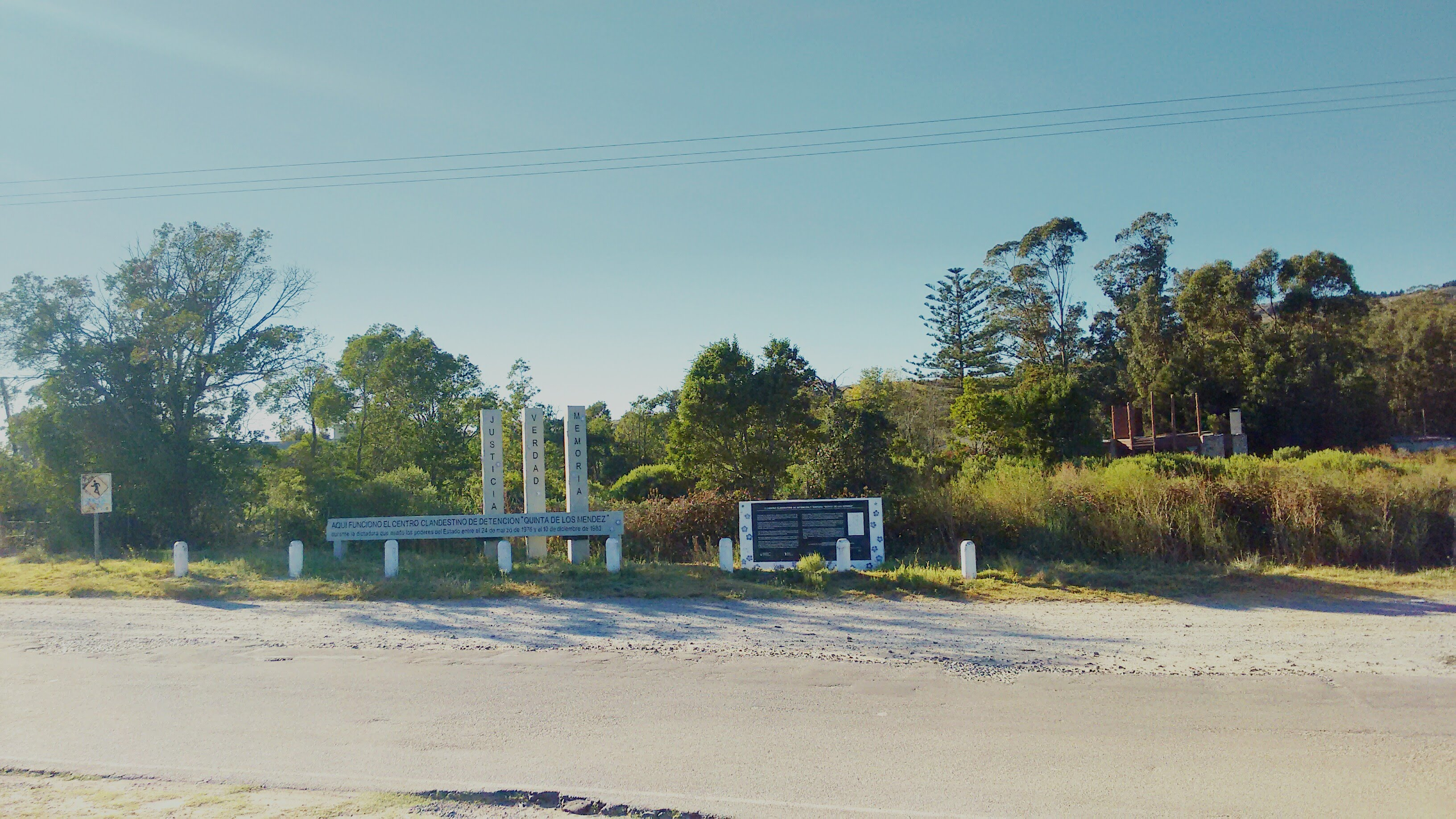
Memorial at the former detention center of Quinta de Mendez

The Dirty War (Spanish: Guerra sucia) was the name used by the military junta or civic-military dictatorship of Argentina (Spanish: dictadura cívico-militar de Argentina) for the period of state-sponsored violence in Argentina from 1974 to 1983. During this campaign, military and security forces and death squads in the form of the Argentine Anticommunist Alliance (AAA, or Triple A) hunted down any political dissidents and anyone believed to be associated with socialism, communism, left-wing Peronism, or the Montoneros movement.

It is estimated that between 13,000 and 30,000 people were killed or disappeared, many of whom were impossible to formally document. A secret report from Chilean secret police DINA estimated that 22,000 people had been murdered or disappeared by 1978. During this period, at least 12,000 "detenidos-desaparecidos" (detained-disappeared) were held by the National Executive Branch (Poder Ejecutivo Nacional or PEN) and kept in clandestine detention camps throughout Argentina, before eventually being freed under diplomatic pressure.The primary targets were communist guerrillas and sympathisers but also included students, militants, trade unionists, writers, journalists, artists and any citizens suspected of being left-wing activists who were thought to be a political or ideological threat to the junta. According to human rights organisations in Argentina, the victims included between 1,900 and 3,000 Jews, amounting to some 5–12% of those targeted despite Argentinian Jews comprising only 1% of the population. The killings were committed by the Junta in an attempt to fully silence social and political opposition.

By the 1980s, economic collapse, public discontent, and the disastrous handling of the Falklands War resulted in the end of the junta and the restoration of democracy in Argentina, effectively ending the Dirty War. Numerous members of the junta were prosecuted and imprisoned for crimes against humanity and genocide as a result of their actions during the period.

== Overview ==
In the decades before the 1976 coup, the Argentine military, along with the supporting Argentine establishment, opposed Juan Perón's populist government. A coup was attempted in 1951, but was unsuccessful. In 1955 the Argentinian military successfully took control in the Revolución Libertadora. After seizing power, the armed forces proscribed his political ideology, Peronism, leading to resistance from workplaces and trade unions, as the working classes sought to protect the economic and social improvements obtained under Perón's rule. Over time, democratic rule was partially restored, but promises of legalising freedom of expression and expanding political liberties for Peronists did not occur. These grievances spurred the rise of numerous leftist guerrilla groups in the 1960s, namely Uturuncos and the EGP (People's Guerrilla Army).

Perón returned from exile in 1973. The Ezeiza massacre marked the end of the alliance between left- and right-wing factions of Peronism. Shortly before his death in 1974, Perón withdrew his support for Montoneros. By the time his widow Isabel was president, the Minister of Social Welfare José López Rega had already organised the far-right death squad known as Argentine Anticommunist Alliance (AAA, or Triple A). In 1975, during Operativo Independencia, Isabel Perón and later her replacement Ítalo Luder signed decrees empowering the military and the police to "annihilate" left-wing "subversive elements".

The junta, calling itself the National Reorganization Process, organised and carried out strong repression of perceived political dissidents through the government's military and security forces. They were responsible for the arrest, torture, killings and/or forced disappearances of an estimated 13,000 to 30,000 people. The junta was supported by Washington, and received $50 million in military aid. Prior to the 1976 coup, another far right group, Alianza Anticomunista Argentina, provoked many deaths and used methods that were then adopted by government forces.

The primary targets for both the junta and Triple A were young professionals, high school and college students, and trade union members, due to their involvement in left-wing political organisations. Favoured methods of assassination were via mass shootings and death flights, which threw victims into the South Atlantic Ocean. An estimated 12,000 prisoners were detained in a network of 340 secret concentration camps, located throughout Argentina. Victims are referred to as desaparecidos due to the clandestine imprisonments, which occurred without due process, governmental acknowledgement of the detentions and deaths. The vast majority of those who were killed disappeared without a trace and there remains no firm record of their fate.

The junta referred to their policy of suppressing opponents as the National Reorganization Process (Proceso de Reorganización Nacional). Argentine military and security forces also created paramilitary death squads, operating behind "fronts" as supposedly independent units. Argentina coordinated actions with other South American dictatorships during Operation Condor. Faced with increasing public opposition and severe economic problems, the military tried to regain popularity by occupying the disputed Falkland Islands. After their defeat to Britain in the Falklands War, the military government were forced to step aside in disgrace and allow for free elections to be held in late 1983.

=== Restoration of democracy and trial of the juntas ===
In the 1983 elections, the democratic government of Raúl Alfonsín claimed office. His government was sworn in on 10 December 1983 and the war came to an end. Alfonsín organised the National Commission on the Disappearance of Persons (Comisión Nacional sobre la Desaparición de Personas, CONADEP) to investigate crimes committed during the Dirty War, hearing testimony from hundreds of witnesses and developing to build cases against offenders. A tribunal was organised to conduct the prosecution of offenders, holding the Trial of the Juntas in 1985. Nearly 300 people were prosecuted, including many of the leading officers, who were convicted and sentenced for their crimes.

The Argentine armed forces opposed subjecting more of its personnel to the trials, threatening the civilian leadership with another coup. In 1986, the military forced the passage of the Ley de Punto Final (Full Stop Law) in 1986, which "put a line" under previous actions and ended prosecutions for crimes committed by the National Reorganization Process. Fearing military uprisings, Argentina's first two presidents sentenced only the two top Dirty War former commanders. The Punto Final Law stated that military personnel involved in torture were doing their "jobs." In 1994, President Carlos Menem praised the military in their "fight against subversion".

=== Repeal of laws ===
In 2003, Congress repealed the Pardon Laws, and in 2005 the Argentine Supreme Court ruled they were unconstitutional. Under the presidency of Nestor Kirchner, the Argentine government re-opened its investigations on crimes against humanity and genocide in 2006 and began the prosecution of military and security officers.

== Origin of the term ==
The term "Dirty War" was used by the military junta, which claimed that a war, albeit with "different" methods (including the large-scale application of torture and rape), was necessary to maintain social order and eradicate political subversives. This explanation has been questioned in court by human rights NGOs, as it suggests that a "civil war" was going on and implies justification for the killings. During the 1985 Trial of the Juntas, public prosecutor Julio Strassera suggested that the term "Dirty War" was a "euphemism to try to conceal gang activities", as though they were legitimate military activities.

Although the junta said its objective was to eradicate guerrilla activity because of its threat to the state, it conducted wide-scale repression of the general population. It worked against all political opposition and those it considered on the left: trade unionists (half of the victims), students, intellectuals including journalists and writers, rights activists and other civilians and their families. Many others went into exile to survive and many remain in exile today despite the return of democracy in 1983. During the Trial of the Juntas, the prosecution established that the guerrillas were never strong enough to pose a real threat to the state and could not be considered a belligerent as in a war:

The guerrilla had not taken control of any part of the national territory; they had not obtained recognition of interior or anterior belligerency, they were not massively supported by any foreign power, and they lacked the population's support.

The program of extermination of dissidents was referred to as genocide by a court of law for the first time during the trial of Miguel Etchecolatz, a former senior official of the Buenos Aires Provincial Police.

Crimes committed during this time (genocide of civilian population and other crimes against humanity) are not covered under the laws of war (jus in bello), which shields enlisted personnel from prosecution for acts committed under orders given by a superior officer or the state. Estela de Carlotto, president of the Argentine human rights non-governmental organisation Grandmothers of the Plaza de Mayo states:

[That term] is a way to minimize state terrorism and is a term born outside the country. It is a totally wrong concept; there was no war, dirty nor clean.

== Previous events ==
=== Return of Peronism ===
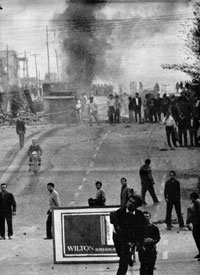
Cordobazo, 29 May 1969

In 1955, former army officer Juan Perón was ousted from the presidency by a coup (Revolución Libertadora). This occurred three months after the Bombing of Plaza de Mayo, a failed coup attempt considered by some as "state terrorism". Subsequently, Peronism was proscribed and hostility against it and against populist politics dominated Argentine politics. Pedro Eugenio Aramburu's Decree Law 4161/56 prohibited the use of Perón's name. When General Lanusse, who was part of the Argentine Revolution, called for elections in 1973, he authorized the return of political parties. However, Perón, who had been invited back from exile, was barred from seeking office. Aramburu was kidnapped and executed extrajudicially by members of Montoneros in June 1970.

In May 1973, Peronist Héctor José Cámpora was elected as president. Immediately following his presidential inauguration, 40,000 civilian demonstrators marched on the Villa Devoto prison to demand the release of some 500 jailed left-wing guerrillas and supporting militants. To avoid a bloody confrontation, these revolutionaries and activists were physically let out of the gates that evening.The presidential pardon and subsequent congressional amnesty delivered a profound institutional shock to Argentina's security apparatus. Embittered by the reality that years of police work and counterinsurgency operations had been erased overnight, the military and police leadership forged a sinister plot to never rely on the judicial system again. This "take no prisoners" pact cemented the nature of the state violence in Argentina; when the security forces launched their waves of terror, they abandoned lawful arrests and public indictments in favour of nocturnal, deniable abductions on the part of the Tiple. These state-backed death-squads soon established a vast network of secret concentration camps where captives were tortured without legal recourse and executed. To erase the evidence of this genocide and avoid leaving physical evidence, the death-squads turned to horrific disposal methods with political prisoners buried anonymously in mass graves or remote plots, registered falsely under the acronym "N.N." (No Nomen, or No Name) and committing some of the worst crimes against humanity in the process.

It was broadly understood that Perón was the real power behind him, as Cámpora's campaign stated. Peronism has been difficult to define according to traditional political classifications and different periods must be distinguished. A populist and nationalist movement, it has sometimes been accused of fascist tendencies. Following nearly two decades of weak civilian governments, economic decline and military interventionism, Perón returned from exile on 20 June in 1973, as the country was becoming engulfed in financial, social and political disorder. The months preceding Perón's return were marked by important social movements across South America. In particular, these movements spread across the Southern Cone, before the military intervention of the 1970s. During Héctor Cámpora's first months of government (May–July 1973), approximately 600 social conflicts, strikes, and factory occupations had taken place.

Upon Perón's arrival at Buenos Aires Airport, snipers opened fire on the crowds of Peronist sympathizers. Known as the 1973 Ezeiza massacre, this event marked the split between left-wing and right-wing factions of Peronism. Perón was re-elected in 1973, backed by a broad coalition that ranged from trade unionists in the center to fascists on the right (including members of the neo-fascist Movimiento Nacionalista Tacuara), and socialists like the Montoneros on the left. Following the Ezeiza massacre and Perón's denouncing of "bearded immature idealists", Perón sided with the Peronist right, the trade unionist bureaucracy and Radical Civic Union of Ricardo Balbín, Cámpora's unsuccessful rival at the May 1973 elections. Some leftist Peronist governors were deposed, among them Ricardo Obregón Cano, governor of Córdoba, who was ousted by a police coup in February 1974. According to historian Servetto, "the Peronist right... thus stimulated the intervention of security forces to resolve internal conflicts of Peronism."

On 19 January 1974, the Trotskyist People's Revolutionary Army attacked the military garrison in the Buenos Aires city of Azul, prompting a harsh response from the then constitutional president Juan Perón and contributing to his shift towards the rightist faction of the justicialist movement during the last months of his life.

Extreme right wing vigilante organisations – linked to Triple A or its kind of "subsidiary" Córdoba "Comando Libertadores de América" – assassinated the union leader and ex-Peronist governor of Córdoba, Atilio López, as well as leftist lawyers Rodolfo Ortega Peña and Silvio Frondizi, brother of the ousted former Argentine president Arturo Frondizi, who had served as first president between 1 May 1958 and 29 March 1962. Also in 1974, the Third World priest Carlos Mugica and dozens of political activists from the left were assassinated.

=== Isabel Perón's government ===
Juan Perón died on 1 July 1974 and was replaced by his vice-president and third wife, Isabel Perón, who ruled Argentina until she was overthrown in March 1976 by the military. The 1985 CONADEP human rights commission counted 458 assassinations from 1973 to 1975 in its report Nunca Más (Never Again): 19 in 1973, 50 in 1974 and 359 in 1975, carried out by paramilitary groups, who acted mostly under the José López Rega's parapolice and paramilitary Triple A death squad (according to Argenpress, at least 25 trade-unionists were assassinated in 1974). However, the repression of the social movements had already started before the attempt on Yrigoyen's life: on 17 July 1973, the General Confederation of Labour (CGT) section in Salta was closed while the CGT, the Sindicato de Mecánicos y Afines del Transporte Automotor (SMATA)^{[es]} and Luz y Fuerza^{[es]} in Córdoba were victims of armed attacks. Agustín Tosco, Secretary General of Luz y Fuerza, successfully avoided arrest and went into hiding until his death on 5 November 1975.

Trade unionists were also targeted by the repression in 1973 as Carlos Bache was assassinated on 21 August 1973; Enrique Damiano, of the Taxis Trade Union of Córdoba, on 3 October; Juan Avila, also of Córdoba, the following day; Pablo Fredes, on 30 October in Buenos Aires; and Adrián Sánchez, on 8 November 1973 in the Province of Jujuy. Assassinations of trade unionists, lawyers and so on continued and increased in 1974 and 1975 while the most combative trade unions were closed and their leaders arrested. In August 1974, Isabel Perón's government took away the rights of trade unionist representation of the Federación Gráfica Bonaerense, whose Secretary General Raimundo Ongaro was arrested in October 1974. During the same month of August 1974, the SMATA Córdoba trade-union, in conflict with the company Ika Renault, was closed by the national directorate of trade unions and the majority of its leaders and activists arrested. Most of them were assassinated during the 1976–1983 dictatorship. Atilio López, General Secretary of the CGT of Córdoba and former Vice Governor of the Province, was assassinated in Buenos Aires on 16 September 1974.

Peronist guerrillas, estimated at 300–400 active members (Montoneros) in 1977 (and 2,000 at its peak in 1975, though almost half of them related to militia), committed a number of attacks during this period such as bombings at the Goodyear and Firestone distributors, Riker and Eli pharmaceutical laboratories, Xerox Corporation, and Pepsi-Cola bottling companies. Director-general of the Fiat Concord company in Argentina was kidnapped by ERP guerrillas in Buenos Aires on 21 March 1972 and found murdered on 10 April. In 1973, a Ford Motor Company executive was killed in a kidnapping attempt. A Peugeot representative was kidnapped and later released for a reported US$200,000, and Peronist Armed Forces (FAP) guerrillas killed John Swint, the American general manager of the Ford Motor Company. On December, the director of Peugeot in Argentina was kidnapped.

In 1974, FAP guerrillas killed the labour relations manager of the IKA-Renault Motor Company in Córdoba. In 1975 a manager of an auto parts factory and a production manager of Mercedes-Benz were kidnapped by Montoneros, and an executive of the US Chrysler Corporation and a manager of the Renault plant in Córdoba were killed.

In all, 83 servicemen and policemen were killed and some 500 wounded in left-wing guerrilla incidents between 1973 and 1974.

==== Annihilation decrees ====
In 1975, the Guevarist People's Revolutionary Army (ERP), inspired by Che Guevara's foco theory, began a small rural insurgency in the province of Tucumán with no more than 100 men and women, but were soon defeated by the Argentine Army. In February 1975, Isabel Perón signed the secret presidential decree 261, which ordered the army to illegally neutralise and/or "annihilate" the insurgency in Tucumán, the smallest province in Argentina. Operativo Independencia granted power to the armed forces to "execute all military operations necessary for the effects of neutralizing or annihilating the action of subversive elements acting in the Province of Tucumán." Extreme right-wing death squads used their hunt for far-left guerrillas as a pretext to exterminate any and all ideological opponents on the left and as a cover for common crimes.

In July, there was a general strike. The government, presided temporarily by provisional president of the Senate Ítalo Luder from the Peronist party, replacing Isabel (who was ill for a short period), issued three decrees, 2770, 2771 and 2772. These created a Defense Council headed by the president and including his ministers and chiefs of the armed forces. It was given the command of the national and provincial police and correctional facilities and its mission was to "annihilate [...] subversive elements throughout the country".

==== March 1975 raid in Santa Fe ====
Isabel Perón's government ordered a raid on 20 March 1975, which involved 4,000 military and police officers, in Villa Constitución, Santa Fe in response to various trade-unionist conflicts. Many citizens and 150 activists and trade unionist leaders were arrested while the Unión Obrera Metalúrgica's subsidiary in Villa Constitución was closed down with the agreement of the trade unions' national direction, headed by Lorenzo Miguel. Repression affected trade unionists of large firms such as Ford, Fiat, Renault, Mercedes-Benz, Peugeot and Chrysler and was sometimes carried on with support from the firms' executives and from the trade unionist bureaucracies.

== Military's rise to power ==
The sentence at the Trials of the Juntas stated the following: "The subversives had not taken control of any part of the national territory; they had not obtained recognition of interior or anterior belligerency, they were not massively supported by any foreign power, and they lacked the population's support." However, the supposed threat was used for the coup.

In 1975, President Isabel Perón, under pressure from the military establishment, appointed Jorge Rafael Videla commander-in-chief of the Argentine Army. "As many people as necessary must die in Argentina so that the country will again be secure," declared Videla in 1975 in support of the death squads. The worst year of the Argentine guerrilla violence, 1976, saw 156 members of the Argentine Armed Forces killed. During 1977, in just Buenos Aires alone, 36 police were reported killed in action against the remaining leftist guerrillas and supporting militants still operating in the Argentine capital.

Lieutenant-General Videla was one of the military heads of the coup that overthrew Isabel Perón on 24 March 1976. In her place, a military junta, headed by General Videla, Admiral Emilio Eduardo Massera and General Orlando Agosti and was installed. During the first three months of the military coup, more than 70 Argentine police were reported killed fighting the remaining guerrilla violence.

The junta, which dubbed itself National Reorganization Process, systematised the repression, in particular through the way of "forced disappearances" (desaparecidos), which made it very difficult as was the case in Augusto Pinochet's Chile to file legal suits as the bodies were never found. This generalisation of state terror tactics has been explained in part by the information received by the Argentine military in the infamous School of Americas and also by French instructors from the secret services, who taught them "counter-insurgency" tactics first experimented with during the Algerian War (1954–1962).

By 1976, Operation Condor was at its height. Chilean exiles in Argentina were threatened again and had to seek refuge in a third country. Chilean General Carlos Prats had already been assassinated by the Chilean DINA in Buenos Aires in 1974, with the help of former DINA agents Michael Townley and Enrique Arancibia. Cuban diplomats were also assassinated in Buenos Aires in the infamous Automotores Orletti torture center, one of the 300 clandestine prisons of the dictatorship, managed by the Grupo de Tareas 18, headed by Aníbal Gordon, previously convicted for armed robbery and who answered directly to the General Commandant of the Secretariat of Intelligence (SIDE), Otto Paladino. Automotores Orletti was the main base of foreign intelligence services involved in Operation Condor. One of its survivors, José Luis Bertazzo, who was detained for two months there, identified Chileans, Uruguayans, Paraguayans and Bolivians among the prisoners. These captives were interrogated by agents from their own countries.

According to John Dinges's Los años del Cóndor, Chilean MIR prisoners in Orletti center told José Luis Bertazzo that they had seen two Cuban diplomats, Jesús Cejas Arias and Crescencio Galañega, tortured by Gordon's group and interrogated by a man who came from Miami to interrogate them. The two Cuban diplomats, charged with the protection of the Cuban ambassador to Argentina Emilio Aragonés, had been kidnapped on 9 August 1976 by 40 armed SIDE agents who blocked off all sides of the street with their Ford Falcons, the cars used by the security forces during the dictatorship. According to John Dinges, the FBI as well as the CIA were informed of their abduction. In his book, Dinges published a cable sent by Robert Scherrer, an FBI agent in Buenos Aires on 22 September 1976, where he mentions in passing that Michael Townley, later convicted of the assassination on 21 September 1976 of former Chilean minister Orlando Letelier in Washington, D.C., had also taken part in the interrogation of the two Cubans. The former head of the DINA confirmed to Argentine federal judge María Servini de Cubría on 22 December 1999, in Santiago de Chile, the presence of Townley and Cuban Guillermo Novo Sampoll in the Orletti center. The two men travelled from Chile to Argentina on 11 August 1976 and "cooperated in the torture and assassination of the two Cuban diplomats". According to the "terror archives" discovered in Paraguay in 1992, 50,000 persons were murdered in the frame of Condor, 13,000–30,000 disappeared (desaparecidos) and 400,000 incarcerated.

== Civil accomplices ==
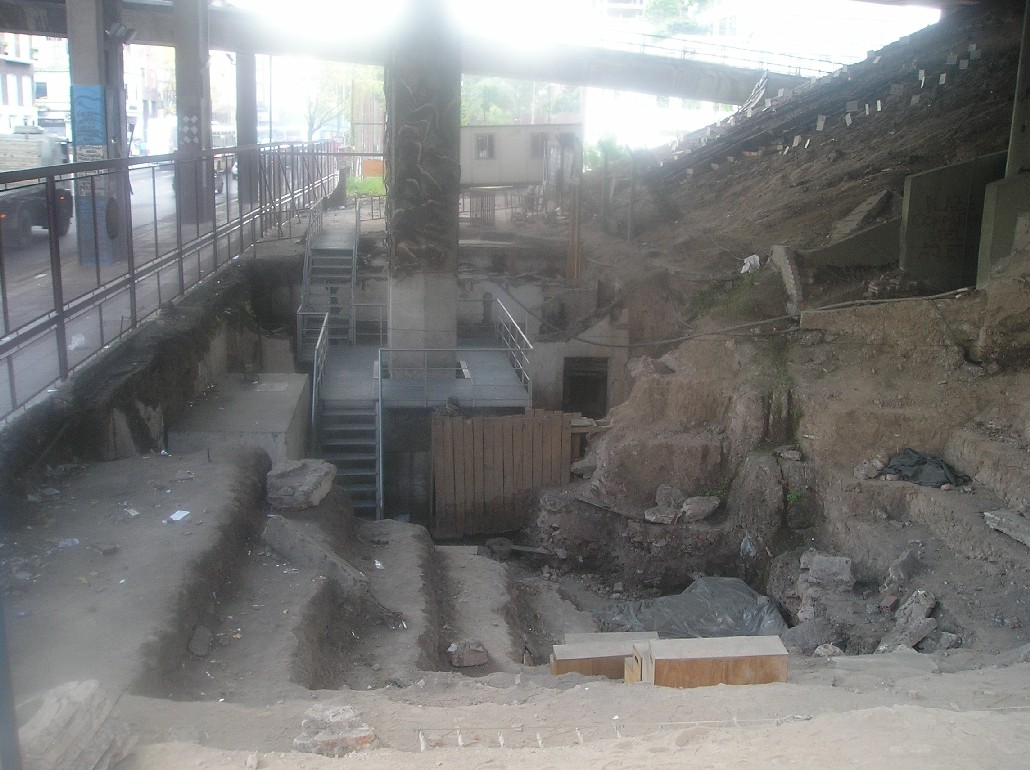
Excavation of the former clandestine detention center Club Atlético, Paseo Colón 1200, City of Buenos Aires

There were also some companies complicit in crimes against humanity. There has been participation of senior executives of Ford, Mercedes-Benz, Acindar, Dálmine Siderca, Ingenio Ledesma, and Astarsa.

Victoria Basualdo, from Columbia University, investigated the complicity between large companies and armed forces. She found six companies in which dozens of union representatives were kidnapped and tortured, often detained inside the companies and transferred to clandestine detention centers (CDC) in vehicles provided by the companies. In the case of Dálmine Siderca, a CDC had been installed next to the factory, connected through a door. In the case of Acindar, a detention and interrogation center, staffed and operated by the Federal Police, was already in existence in 1975 during the Peronist government of Maria Estela Martinez de Peron.

Judge Alicia Vence was in charge of the investigation of acts of "state terrorism" committed in facilities and with the participation of authorities of the companies Ford and Mercedes-Benz. According to witnesses, the center at Mercedes-Benz was led by the racing driver Juan Manuel Fangio. In 2015, an investigation was conducted to investigate these claims. José Alfredo Martínez de Hoz, president of the metallurgical company Acindar, who was Minister of Economy between 1976 and 1980, was criminally prosecuted in the case of the kidnapping of the businessmen Federico and Miguel Gutheim, owners of SADECO cotton company.

=== Papel Prensa ===
There was also suspected participation from national media outlets such as Clarin, La Nación and La Razón, the three most important Argentine newspapers at the time. Together they negotiated the buyout of Papel Prensa, the largest national manufacturer of newsprint, then owned by the widow of David Graiver, Lidia Papaleo and his family estate, after his death in a plane crash on 7 August 1976.

Papaleo and the other private partners negotiated the sale of their shares on 2 November 1976. She, along with Graiver's brother and father, were illegally detained by the Buenos Aires Province Police on 14 March 1977, on suspected financial connections her late husband had with the guerrilla organisation Montoneros, and sentenced to 15 years imprisonment, though an appeals court later cleared the defendants of all charges.

According to Papaleo, the sale was made under duress. She had been receiving death threats and had been told by Papel Prensa's president, Pedro Martínez Segovia, who was representing then Minister of Economy José Alfredo Martínez de Hoz, that she should sell her stake in the company. She, along with her family, attended a night meeting at the La Nación offices on 2 November. There, she testified, that the representative of Clarín, Hector Magnetto, presented her with a document which said "Sign, or it will cost you your daughter's life and your own."

In September 1978, a group of businessmen, among whom were Ernestina Herrera de Noble and Hector Magnetto from Grupo Clarín and Bartolomé Luis Mitre from La Nación, along with members of the military junta, inaugurated the Papel Prensa plant in San Justo.

In 2016, Magnetto, Mitre and Noble were declared innocent. Federal Judge Julián Ercolini ruled that there was not enough evidence of any wrongdoing to accuse them.

== Planned false flag action by SIDE agents ==
During a 1981 interview whose contents were revealed by declassified CIA documents in 2000, former DINA agent Michael Townley explained that Ignacio Novo Sampol, member of the CORU anti-Castro organisation, had agreed to involve the Cuban Nationalist Movement in the kidnapping in Buenos Aires of the president of a Dutch bank. The abduction was organised by civilian SIDE agents to obtain a ransom. Townley said that Novo Sampol had provided $6,000 from the Cuban Nationalist Movement, forwarded to the civilian SIDE agents to pay for the preparation expenses of the kidnapping. After returning to the United States, Novo Sampol sent Townley a stock of paper, used to print pamphlets in the name of Grupo Rojo (Red Group), an imaginary Argentine Marxist terrorist organisation, which was to claim credit for the abduction of the Dutch banker. Townley declared that the pamphlets were distributed in Mendoza and Córdoba together with false flag bombings perpetrated by SIDE agents. The aim was to establish the existence of the fake Grupo Rojo. However, the SIDE agents procrastinated too much and the kidnapping was never carried out.

== Adolfo Scilingo's death flights ==
Adolfo Scilingo, a former navy captain, was tried for genocide, 30 counts of murder related to two "death flights", 93 counts of causing injury, 255 counts of terrorism, and 286 counts of torture. Scilingo helped orchestrate the military regime's death flights, which the state sponsored to carry out its larger goal of silencing political dissidents during the Dirty War. To aid in its process of kidnapping, drugging, and pushing Argentine political prisoners to their deaths over the Rio de la Plata, the Argentine military bought five PA-51 Skyvans from Britain.

Before eventually being found guilty for his role in Argentina's death flights, Scilingo was the first military official from the regime to publicly come forward to journalists and admit the human rights violations he and other military personnel committed during the Dirty War. At the time, he defended his actions as part of the state's perceived righteous war against the spread of communism, saying, "I did what I did because I was absolutely and totally in agreement" with the state's ambitions.

Leaders from the Dirty War-era regime, even in post-war Argentina in the late 1980s, defended their "disappearance" practices on political opponents as a necessary mechanism to defend the country's democracy in the wake of potential Marxist uprisings among its civilian population. However, once Scilingo testified to the extent of the death flights, the former regime's leaders struggled to find sympathy or understanding from a damaged Argentine public.

Shortly after publicly admitting to his role in the death flights, Scilingo was abducted and taken to the outskirts of Buenos Aires by a covert group of individuals who tortured him by using a knife to etch the initials of the three journalists he confessed to, promising to murder him if he kept speaking publicly of his involvement in the state-sponsored violence of the war. By 1999, the international prosecution against Scilingo was underway, as he was indicted, tried, and ultimately found guilty for his role in the regime's death flights.

By the mid-2000s, Díaz Bessone's book, Memoria Completa, helped reshape public perceptions of the Dirty War and the military's human rights violations by focusing on the victims and survivors of the conflict, allowing the country to reconcile its jaded past and rebuild toward a democratic future. Still, there remain open-ended questions as to the extent of those who were involved in perpetrating the war's death flights and the total number of the operation's victims, partly due to the ongoing threat of violence or prosecution following the war's end.

== Human rights violations ==
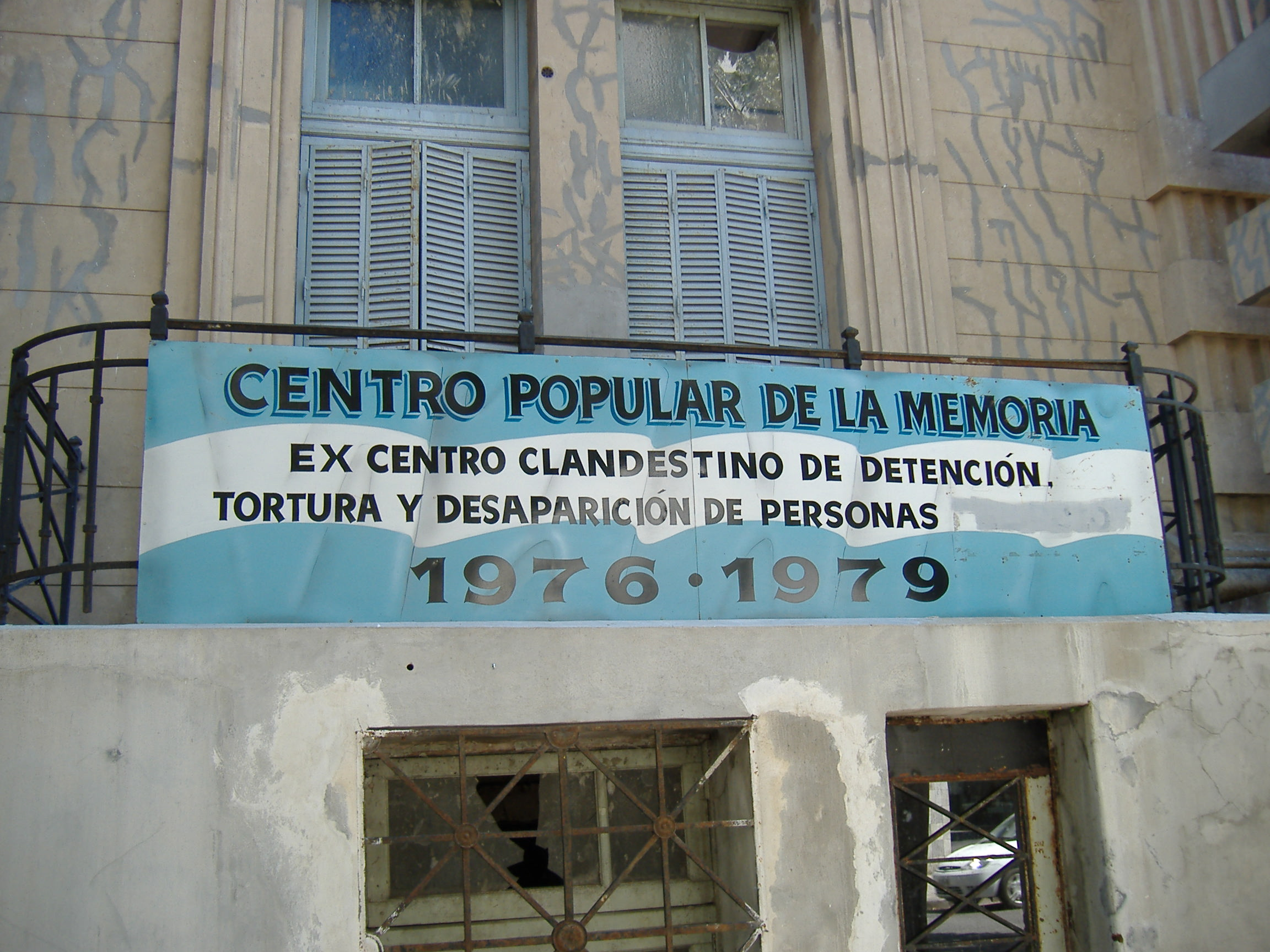
A former illegal detention center in the headquarters of the provincial police of Santa Fe in Rosario, now a memorial

The exact chronology of the repression occurring before the Operation Condor's beginning in March 1976 is still debated, but some sectors claim the long political conflict started in 1969 as individual cases of state-sponsored terrorism against Peronism and the left can be traced back to the bombing of Plaza de Mayo and Revolución Libertadora in 1955. The Trelew massacre of 1972, the actions of the Argentine Anticommunist Alliance since 1973 and Isabel Martínez de Perón's "annihilation decrees" against left-wing guerrillas during Operativo Independencia (Operation Independence) in 1975 have also been suggested as dates for the beginning of the Dirty War.

The discontent with Perón in 1973 started due to his drift to the right after having been a popular leftist leader for the first half of the 20th century. Many of the groups that supported him throughout the 1940s and 1950s argued that "Peron was betraying the movement by aligning himself with industrialists and foreign interests."^{:59} The attacks by the left were met by ruthless action by the government and the Argentina Anticommunist Alliance (AAA), a group known since the 1930s for its violent and brutal stance towards leftist groups.

Targets of the junta were anyone believed to be associated with activist groups, including trade union members and students. These included underage students, like the ones tortured and murdered in the Night of the Pencils, an operation directed by Ramón Camps, General and head of the Buenos Aires Provincial Police from April 1976 to December 1977. The rationale behind attacks against non-combatants was the belief that anyone not sharing government ideology or supporting its actions was a threat; it was believed that "any party that has supported or continues to support the enemy shall be considered a party of the enemy."

Other junta targets were people who uncovered evidence of government corruption and those thought to hold left-wing views (including French nuns Léonie Duquet and Alice Domon, kidnapped by Alfredo Astiz). Ramón Camps told Clarín in 1984 that he had used torture as an interrogation method and orchestrated 5,000 forced disappearances. He had justified the appropriation of newborns from their imprisoned mothers "because subversive parents will raise subversive children". The individuals who suddenly vanished are called los desaparecidos, meaning "the missing ones" or "disappeared". The people that disappeared throughout the 1970s came from a variety of backgrounds: not just suspected terrorists, but also non-combatants. According to a declassified 1979 document from the U.S. Department of State, 55 disappearances were occurring per month, or approximately two per day. Additionally, people who sought to stay "peaceful" during the attacks were targeted by the government, based on the belief that if left alone, they would pose an even greater danger. This was despite the fact that 80% of Argentine torture victims had no knowledge of subversive activities.

In December 1976, 22 captured Montoneros responsible for the death of General Cáceres Monié and the attack on the Argentine Army 29th Mountain Infantry Regiment were tortured and executed during the massacre of Margarita Belén in the military Chaco Province, for which Videla would be found guilty of homicide during the 1985 Trial of the Juntas, in addition to the guilty verdicts against Cristino Nicolaides, junta leader Leopoldo Galtieri and Santa Fe Provincial Police chief Wenceslao Ceniquel. The same year, 50 unknown persons were illegally executed by firing squad in Córdoba.

Victims' relatives uncovered evidence that some children taken from their mothers soon after birth were being raised as the adopted children of military servicemembers, as in the case of Stella Montesano, or of Silvia Quintela, a member of the Montoneros guerrilla movement. For decades, the Asociación Civil Abuelas de Plaza de Mayo, a group founded in 1977, has demanded the return of the kidnapped children, estimated to number as many as 500. In 1979, security forces violently arrested and threatened the members of this group, made up predominantly of mothers who held weekly silent demonstrations in the capital's main square for over two years to demand justice for their disappeared children. That same year, over 38 bodies, "many without heads or hands", were found on Argentina's shorelines.

A declassified May 1978 U.S. State Department memorandum said that "if there has been a net reduction in reports of torture, this is not because torture has been forsworn but 'derives from fewer operations' because the number of terrorists and subversives has diminished." The memorandum adds that disappearances "include not only suspected terrorists but also encompass a broader range of people – including labor leaders, workers, clergymen, human rights advocates, scientists, doctors, and political party leaders". The document also describes torture methods used to intimidate and extract information, including electric shocks, prolonged immersion in water, cigarette burns, sexual abuse, rape, removal of teeth and fingernails, castration, and burning with boiling water, oil and acid. Another declassified U.S. State Department memorandum stated that security forces "simply murdered" a couple in their own home without taking them to a detention center, showing the unchecked power the military had during the Dirty War.

According to a 2000 Human Rights Review article, in previous Argentine military coups, the military had portrayed itself as seeking to preserve the sacred values of the Argentine people, which justified human rights violations. But none of the prior military actions committed violations on as massive a scale as the 1976 coup.

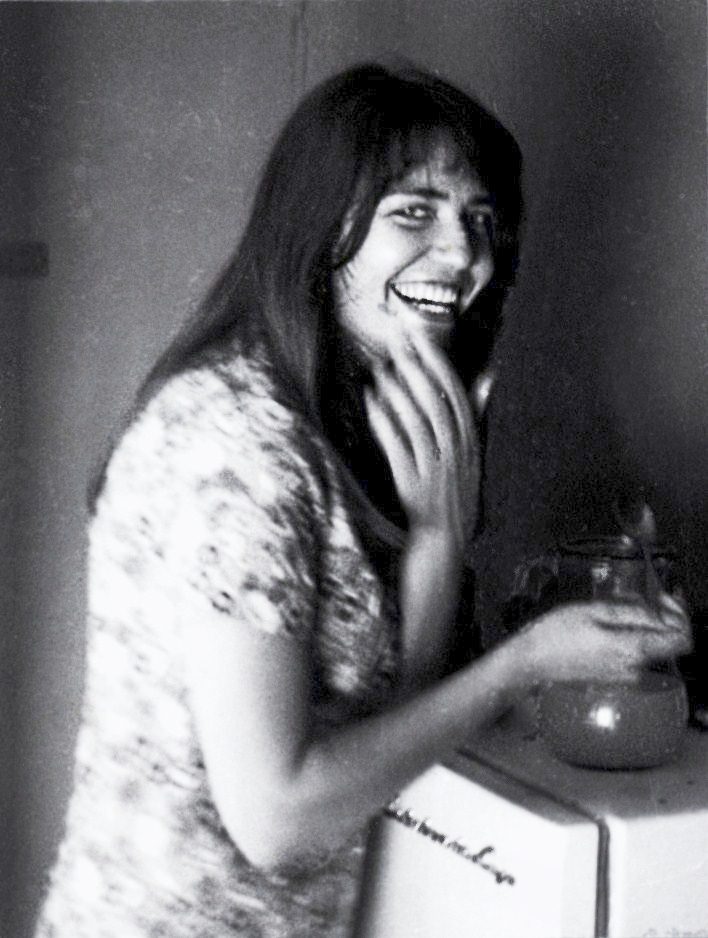
German sociologist Elisabeth Käsemann, murdered in 1977

In late 1979, Amnesty International accused the Videla military government of being responsible for the disappearance of 15,000–20,000 Argentine citizens since the 1976 coup. The Registro Unificado de Víctimas del Terrorismo de Estado (Ruvte) unconvered records of 662 people disappeared under the presidency of Isabel Perón, and another 6,348 disappeared during the military dictatorship.

In 1980, Adolfo Pérez Esquivel, a Catholic human rights activist who had organised the Servicio de Paz y Justicia (Peace and Justice Service) and suffered torture while held without trial for 14 months in a Buenos Aires concentration camp, was awarded the Nobel Peace Prize for his efforts in defence of human rights.

Declassified documents of the Chilean secret police cite an official estimate by the Batallón de Inteligencia 601 of 22,000 killed or "disappeared" between 1975 and mid-1978. During this period, at least 12,000 "disappeared" were detained by PEN (Poder Ejecutivo Nacional, anglicised as National Executive Power) and kept in clandestine detention camps throughout Argentina, before eventually being freed under diplomatic pressure. In 2003, the National Commission on the Disappearance of Persons recorded the forced disappearance of 8,961 persons from 1976 to 1983, although it noted that the actual number is higher. Military junta members currently in prison for crimes against humanity refused to give Argentine courts the lists of names (and numbers) of kidnapped, tortured, murdered or disappeared people, so the exact number of victims remains uncertain.

Under the Carlos Menem government, Congress passed legislation to provide compensation to victims' families. Some 11,000 Argentine next of kin have applied to the relevant authorities and received up to US$200,000 each as monetary compensation for the loss of loved ones during the military dictatorship, while others such as the Mothers of the Plaza de Mayo refused to take any money from a government they considered to follow the same neoliberal policies dictated by Operation Condor. After a 2017 ruling by the Supreme Court, the National Congress of Argentina excluded convicts of crimes against humanity from the reduced sentences granted to other convicts.

=== Role of the Southern Cone of South America ===
In an unclassified memorandum from the U.S. Department of State written in 1976, it was stated that there were cooperation efforts among Argentina, Chile, Uruguay, Brazil, etc. to fight against subversive groups. These efforts ranged from bilateral communications between these countries to capture and monitor these groups; the fight against these "terrorist exponents" proposed to unify the greatest enemies of South America: Brazil and Argentina, given that they saw the threat of communism as more dangerous than each other. An example of this alliance was the deportation of two Montoneros that were to arrive from Mexico in Brazil for a meeting with the leftist group, but the two Montoneros were intercepted in Rio de Janeiro by the Argentine military with permission of the Brazilian military intelligence.

The cooperation between these countries was closely monitored by the United States government given that it has always had interests in maintaining hegemony over this part of the continent. The United States worried that "these regimes threaten[ed] their increasing isolation from the West and the opening of deep ideological divisions among the countries of the hemispheres." Even when the United States refused to call the conflict between these South American countries and the subversive groups a 'Third World War', according to the Memorandum, it was important for Argentina, Brazil, Chile, and Uruguay egos, salaries, and their equipment-budgets to believe in this 'Third World War'. Additionally, the U.S. states its critical goal which is to get the political ideology out of human rights to avoid "charges of 'intervention'" in any of these Latin American countries.

=== United States and violation of human rights in Argentina ===
The interests of the United States in Argentina during the Cold War were rooted in more factors than the threat of the spread of communism across South America. Although the subversive groups that were attacking the Argentine government were leftist groups and some Marxist groups, the United States was also interested in the nuclear power that Argentina possessed. According to a U.S. Department of State memorandum, Argentina was part of the "Dirty Dozen", which was a list of countries that either had the capability of acquiring nuclear weapons but no motivation to do so, or that had the motivation to acquire nuclear weapons but lacked the capability. In the document, it is noted that the biggest security concerns for Argentina were rivals Brazil and Chile, given that these three countries wanted hegemony in Latin America.

In the same realm, the Argentine economy needed to stop depending on fossil fuels and had strong motivation to expand their nuclear program; this could be one of the motivations behind the U.S.'s lack of action against the human rights violations that were happening in Argentina. In a 1976 declassified memorandum from the U.S. Department of State, it is stated the importance to let President Videla the "adverse effect revelation of the assassination scheme will have on Argentina efforts to obtain loans and otherwise come up with solutions for improving its economy". In this same document it is stated that "Argentina is the country which [the United States] should be able to exert the most leverage", which demonstrates the American desire for hegemony in the region, trying to exploit the 'weaknesses' of the Argentine dictatorship for its own benefit. The United States knew that it had to react to the human rights atrocities happening in Argentina because if it did not then "our singling out of Uruguay, Paraguay, and Chile will appear highly politicized and will serve to fuel the critics who argue that US human rights policy is focused on countries where major US interests are not at stake."

In 2012 Professor Melisa Slatman published "Actividades extraterritoriales represivas de la Armada Argentina durante la última dictadura civil militar de Seguridad Nacional (1976–1983)" in the Facultad de Humanidades y Ciencias de la Educación (FaHCE) of Universidad Nacional de la Plata where she gives her perspective about the creation of Operation Condor. Slatman argues that this operation was a product of a social construct where there was no empirical evidence other than the desire for repressive states to gain hegemony of the southern region of the hemisphere, whether that was by the United States and its perceived fight against communism or by the Southern Cone and their desire of control.

She states that there is no way in which the people can truly know what happened during this operation given that the documents that have been released are merely a reflection of the voices and factors that played a part, but it is only one side of the story. The use of these documents as the only sources that there are about Operation Condor fails to inform experts if it was truly an operation or if it was a much more extensive system than that. Furthermore, Slatman argues that these documents present a biased point of view given that the majority of them come from American institutions that seek to present the information that established American hegemony and the unilateral relationships between the U.S. and South American countries.

== Disappeared held under PEN ==
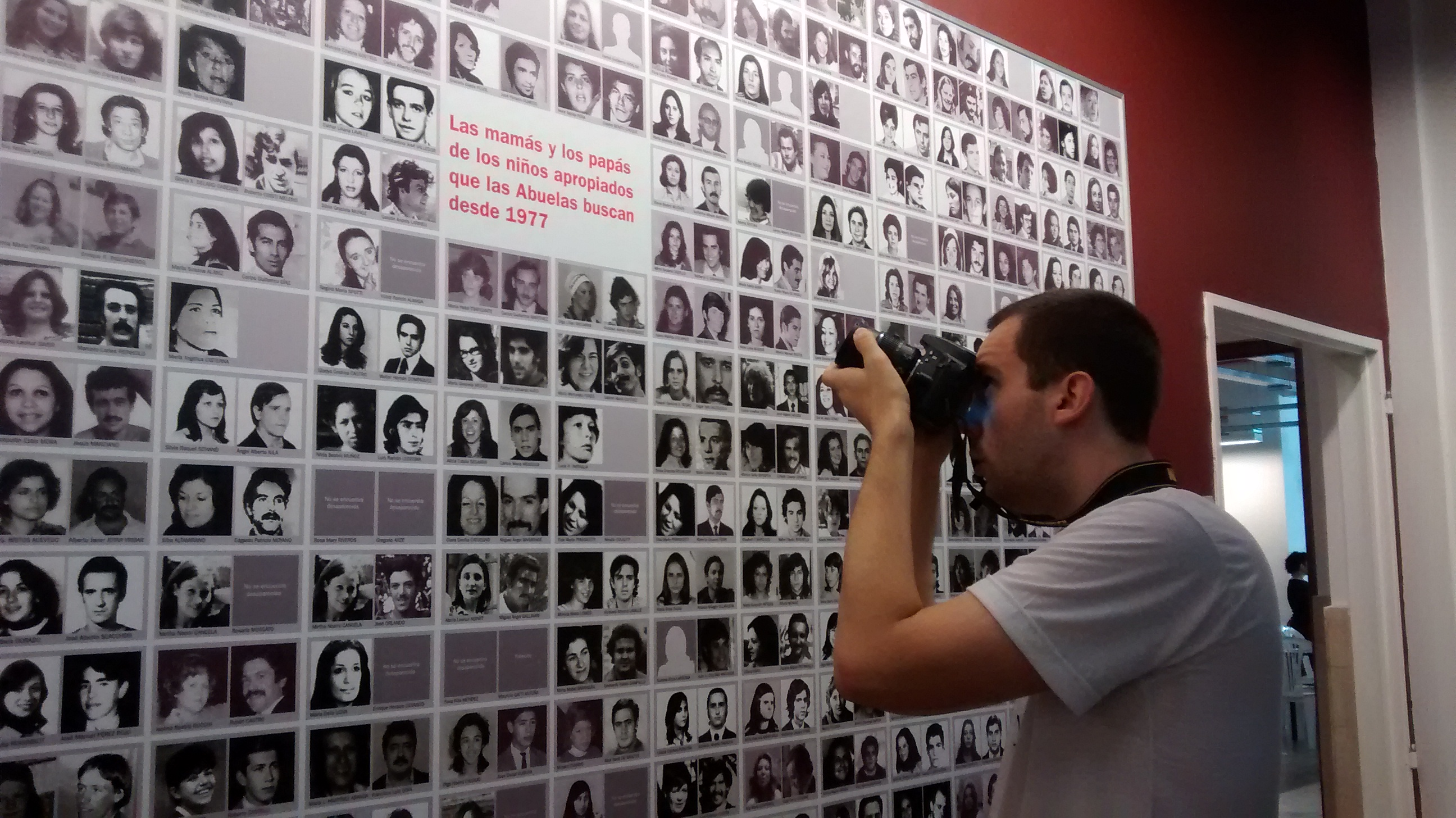
Collections of photos from families whose children and grandchildren had disappeared

By the time of the coup on 24 March 1976, the number of disappeared held under Poder Ejecutivo Nacional (PEN) stood at least 5,182. Some 18,000 disappeared in the form of PEN detainees were imprisoned in Argentina by the end of 1977 and it is estimated that some 3,000 deaths occurred in the Navy Engineering School (ESMA) alone. These disappeared were held incommunicado and reportedly tortured. Some, like senator Hipolito Solari Yrigoyen and socialist leader professor Alfredo Bravo, were "detenidos-desaparecidos".

By refusing to acknowledge the existence of what was later established to be at least 340 concentration camps throughout the country they also denied the existence of their occupants. The total number of people who were detained for long periods was 8,625. Among them was future President Carlos Menem, who between 1976 and 1981 had been a political prisoner.

Some 8,600 PEN disappeared were eventually released under international pressure. Of these, 4,029 were held in illegal detention centers for less than a year, 2,296 for one to three years, 1,172 for three to five years, 668 for five to seven years and 431 for seven to nine years. Of these, 157 were murdered after being released from detention. In one frank memo, written in 1977, an official at the Foreign Ministry issued the following warning:

Our situation presents certain aspects which are without doubt difficult to defend if they are analyzed from the point of view of international law. These are: the delays incurred before foreign consuls can visit detainees of foreign nationality (contravening article 34 of the Convention of Vienna), the fact that those detained under Executive Power (PEN) are denied the right to legal advice or defense, the complete lack of information of persons detained under PEN, the fact that PEN detainees are not processed for long periods of time, the fact that there are no charges against detainees. The kidnapping and disappearance of people.

=== Children of the disappeared ===
At the time when the CONADEP report was prepared, the Asociación Abuelas de Plaza de Mayo (Grandmothers of the Plaza de Mayo or Abuelas), had records of 172 children who disappeared together with their parents or were born at the numerous concentration camps and had not been returned to their families. The Grandmothers of the Plaza de Mayo now believe up to 500 grandchildren were stolen with 102 reported to have been located in September 2010.

On 13 April 2000, the grandmothers received a tip that the birth certificate of Rosa Roisinblit's infant grandson, born in detention, had been falsified and the child given to an Air Force civil agent and his wife. Following the anonymous phone call, he was located and agreed to a DNA blood test, confirming his true identity. Rodolfo Fernando, grandson of Roisinblit, is Case Number 68 of missing children returned to his family through the work of the grandmothers. On 6 October 1978, Roisinblit's daughter, 25-year-old Patricia Julia Roisinblit de Perez, who was active in the Montoneros, was kidnapped along with her husband, 24-year-old José Martín Pérez Rojo.

The case of Maria Eugenia Sampallo (born some time in 1978) also received considerable attention as Sampallo sued the couple who adopted her illegally as a baby after her parents disappeared, both Montoneros. Her grandmother spent 24 years looking for her. The case was filed in 2001 after DNA tests indicated that Osvaldo Rivas and Maria Cristina Gomez were not her biological parents. Along with army Captain Enrique Berthier, who furnished the couple with the baby, they were sentenced respectively to 8, 7 and 10 years in prison for kidnapping.

=== Mothers of the Plaza de Mayo ===
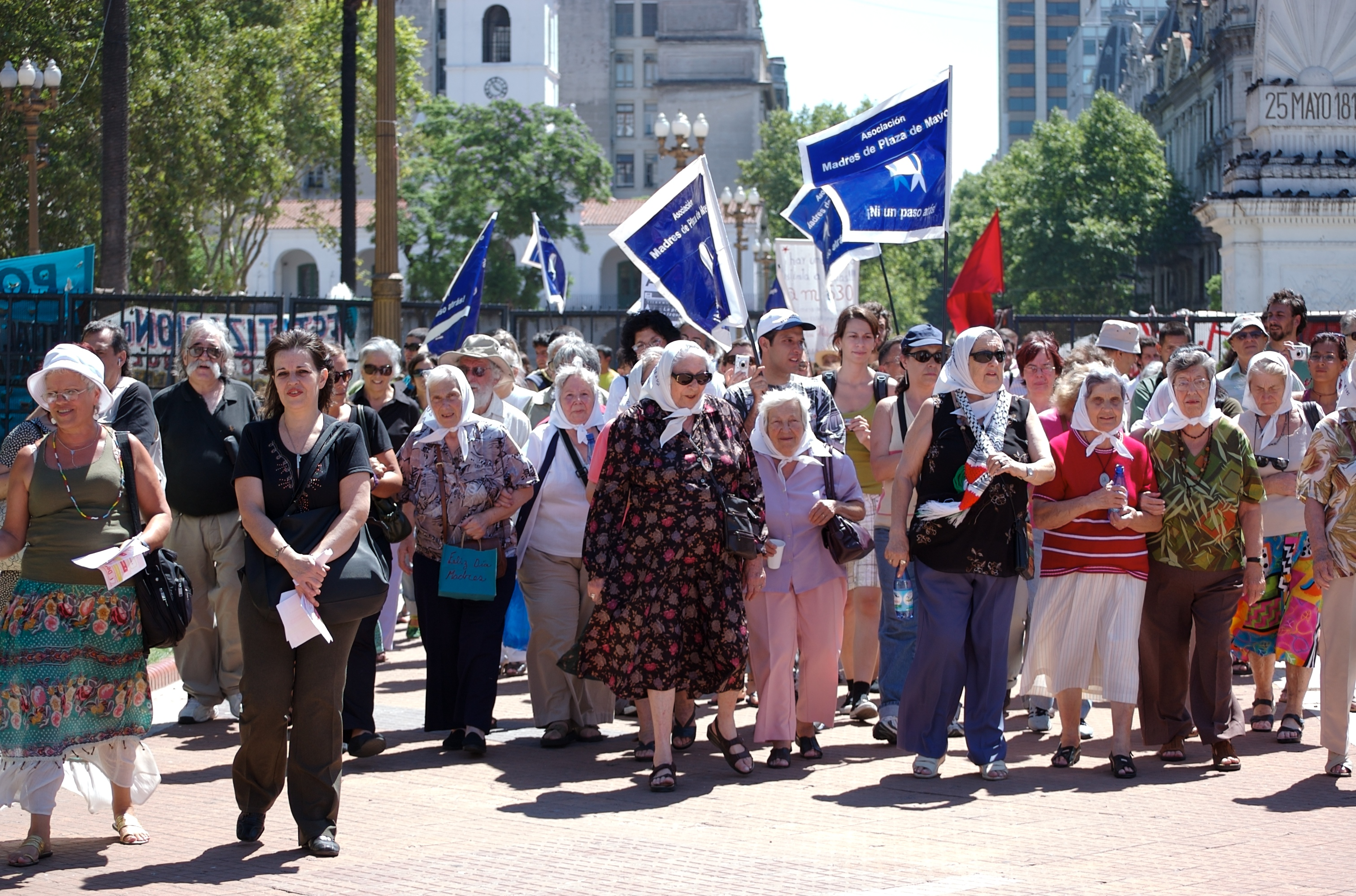
Mothers of the Plaza de Mayo, Argentine mothers whose children were "disappeared" during the Dirty War

The Mothers of the Plaza de Mayo is the best-known Argentine human rights organisation. For over thirty years, the Mothers have campaigned to find out about the fate of their lost relatives. The Mothers first held their vigil at Plaza de Mayo in 1977, where they continue to gather there every Thursday afternoon. An article of the Madres of the Plaza de Mayo monthly publication caused quite a stir in the mid-1980s, when the Human Rights Group Familiares were quoted as saying: "Familiares assumes the causes of their children's fight as their own, vindicates all the disappeared as fighters of the people, [...] [and when occurs] the defeat of imperialism and the sovereignty of the people, we will have achieved our objectives."

In 1986, the Mothers of the Plaza de Mayo split into two groups: Las Madres de Plaza de Mayo – Linea Fundadora (Founding Line) remains focused in recovering the remains of the missing and bringing former police and military commanders to justice. On the other hand, the Asociacion de Madres de Plaza de Mayo (Mothers of the Plaza de Mayo Association) is opposed to the search for and identification of the missing and have also rejected monetary compensation. In April 2004, the former head of the Mothers of Plaza Hebe de Bonafini declared her admiration for her missing children Jorge Omar and Raúl Alfredo for taking up arms as left-wing guerrillas.

To this day, white handkerchiefs are painted on the streets of Argentina, as a reminder of the terroristic actions of the military junta and grief felt by the Mothers of the Plaza de Mayo.

== Coordination on international criminal operations ==
In 1980, the Argentine military helped Nazi war criminal Klaus Barbie, Stefano Delle Chiaie and major drug lords mount the bloody Cocaine Coup of Luis García Meza Tejada in neighbouring Bolivia. They hired 70 foreign agents for this task, which was managed in particular by the 601st Intelligence Battalion headed by General Guillermo Suárez Mason. After having been trained by the French military, in the frame of Operation Charly the Argentine Armed Forces would train their counterparts not only in Nicaragua, but also El Salvador, Honduras and Guatemala. From 1977 to 1984, after the Falklands War, the Argentine Armed Forces exported counter-insurgency tactics, including the systemic use of torture, death squads and disappearances. Special force units, such as Batallón de Inteligencia 601, headed in 1979 by Colonel Jorge Alberto Muzzio, trained the Nicaraguan Contras in the 1980s, in particular in Lepaterique base.

Following the release of classified documents and an interview with Duane Clarridge, a former CIA agent responsible for operations with the Contras, the Clarín showed that with the election of President Jimmy Carter in 1977 the CIA was blocked from engaging in the special warfare it had previously been engaged in. In conformity with the National Security Doctrine, the Argentine military supported U.S. goals in Latin America while they pressured the United States to be more active in counter-revolutionary activities. In 1981, following the election of Ronald Reagan, the CIA took over training of the Contras from Batallón 601. Many Chilean and Uruguayan exiles in Argentina were murdered by Argentine security forces (including high-profile figures such as General Carlos Prats in Buenos Aires in 1974, Héctor Gutiérrez Ruiz and Zelmar Michelini in Buenos Aires in 1976). Others, such as Wilson Ferreira Aldunate escaped death.

== United States involvement with the junta ==
Although at least six U.S. citizens had been "disappeared" by the Argentine military by 1976, high-ranking state department officials including then Secretary of State Henry Kissinger had secretly backed up Argentina's new military rulers. After leaving the U.S. government, Kissinger congratulated Argentina's military junta for combating the left, stating that in his opinion "the government of Argentina had done an outstanding job in wiping out terrorist forces." The importance of his role was not known about until The Nation published in October 1987 an exposé written by Martin Edwin Andersen, a Washington Post and Newsweek special correspondent, revealing that Kissinger had secretly given the junta a "green light" for their state policies, being the U.S. Army School of the Americas (SOA), founded in 1946 and assigned the specific goal of teaching anti-communist counterinsurgency training, the place where several Latin American dictators and generations of their military were educated in state terrorism tactics, including the uses of torture in its curriculum. In 2000/2001, the institute was renamed to WHINSEC. According to a Command and General Foundation News issue, the current curriculum at WHINSEC is compatible with curriculum taught at U.S. military academies. WHINSEC faculty members travel to Fort Leavenworth in Kansas throughout the year to remain up to date on curriculum changes. However, the school remains controversial due to its influence over affairs in Latin America and its education of Latin American state actors on crimes against humanity within the military and law enforcement.

In Buenos Aires, Robert C. Hill, a five-time conservative Republican ambassadorial appointee, worked behind the scenes to keep the Argentina military junta from engaging in massive human rights violations. Upon finding out that Kissinger had given the Argentine generals a "green light" for the state terrorism of the junta in June 1976 while at an Organization of American States meeting in Santiago, Hill quietly scrambled to try to roll back the Kissinger decision. Hill did this although Kissinger aides told him that if he continued, Kissinger would likely have him fired. During that meeting with Argentine foreign minister César Augusto Guzzetti, Kissinger assured him that the United States was an ally.

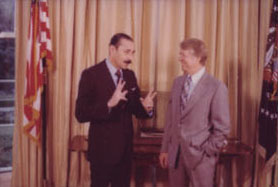
Argentine junta leader Jorge Rafael Videla meeting U.S. President Jimmy Carter in September 1977

In October 1987, The Nation noted:

"Hill was shaken, he became very disturbed, by the case of the son of a thirty-year embassy employee, a student who was arrested, never to be seen again," recalled former New York Times reporter Juan de Onis. "Hill took a personal interest." He went to the Interior Minister, an army general with whom he had worked on drug cases, saying, "Hey, what about this? We're interested in this case." He buttonholed (Foreign Minister Cesar) Guzzetti and, finally, President Jorge R. Videla himself. "All he got was stonewalling; he got nowhere." de Onis said. "His last year was marked by increasing disillusionment and dismay, and he backed his staff on human rights right to the hilt." Patricia Derian, the Mississippi civil rights crusader who became President Jimmy Carter's State Department point person on human rights, said after Hill reported to her Kissinger's real role: "It sickened me that with an imperial wave of his hand, an American could sentence people to death on the basis of a cheap whim. As time went on I saw Kissinger's footprints in a lot of countries. It was the repression of a democratic ideal."

In 1978, former secretary Kissinger was feted by the "dirty war" generals as a much touted guest of honour at the World Cup soccer matches held in Argentina. In a letter to The Nation editor Victor Navasky, protesting publication of the 1987 article, Kissinger claimed: "At any rate, the notion of Hill as a passionate human rights advocate is news to all his former associates". Ironically, Kissinger's posthumous lampooning of Hill (who had died in 1978) as human rights advocate was later shown to be false by none other than once and future Kissinger aide Henry Shlaudeman, later ambassador to Buenos Aires, who told William E. Knight, an oral historian working for the Association for Diplomatic Studies and Training (ADST) Foreign Affairs Oral History Project:

It really came to a head when I was Assistant Secretary, or it began to come to a head, in the case of Argentina where the dirty war was in full flower. Bob Hill, who was Ambassador then in Buenos Aires, a very conservative Republican politician – by no means liberal or anything of the kind, began to report quite effectively about what was going on, this slaughter of innocent civilians. He, at one time in fact, sent me a back-channel telegram saying that the Foreign Minister, who had just come for a visit to Washington and had returned to Buenos Aires, had gloated to him that Kissinger had said nothing to him about human rights. I don't know – I wasn't present at the interview.

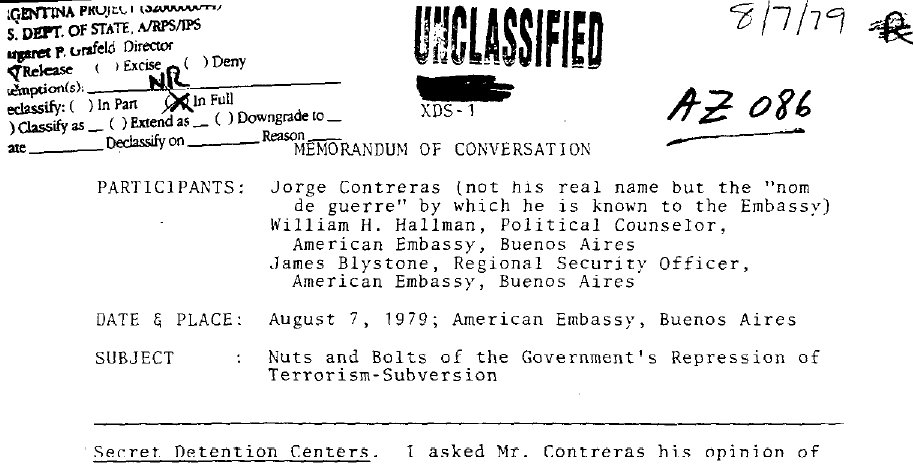
7 August 1979 United States embassy in Argentina memorandum of the conversation with Jorge Contreras, director of Task Force 7 of the Reunion Central section of the 601 Army Intelligence Unit, which gathered members from all parts of the Argentine Armed Forces (subject: "Nuts and Bolts of the Government's Repression of Terrorism-Subversion")

State Department documents obtained in 2003 during the George W. Bush administration by the National Security Archive under the Freedom of Information Act show that in October 1976 Secretary of State Henry Kissinger and other high-ranking U.S. officials gave their full support to the Argentine military junta and urged them to hurry up and finish their actions before the Congress cut military aid. On 5 October 1976, Kissinger met with Argentina's Foreign Minister and stated:

Look, our basic attitude is that we would like you to succeed. I have an old-fashioned view that friends ought to be supported. What is not understood in the United States is that you have a civil war. We read about human rights problems but not the context. The quicker you succeed the better. [...] The human rights problem is a growing one. Your Ambassador can apprise you. We want a stable situation. We won't cause you unnecessary difficulties. If you can finish before Congress gets back, the better. Whatever freedoms you could restore would help.

The United States was also a key provider of economic and military assistance to the Videla regime during the earliest and most intense phase of the repression. In early April 1976, the Congress approved a request by the Ford administration, written and supported by Henry Kissinger, to grant $50,000,000 in security assistance to the junta. At the end of 1976, Congress granted an additional $30,000,000 in military aid and recommendations by the Ford administration to increase military aid to $63,500,000 the following year were also considered by Congress. U.S. assistance, training and military sales to the Videla regime continued under the successive Carter administration up until at least 30 September 1978 when military aid was officially called to a stop within section 502B of the Foreign Assistance Act.

In 1977 and 1978, the United States sold more than $120,000,000 in military spare parts to Argentina and in 1977 the Department of Defense was granted $700,000 to train 217 Argentine military officers. By the time the International Military Education and Training (IMET) program was suspended to Argentina in 1978, total U.S. training costs for Argentine military personnel since 1976 totalled $1,115,000. The Reagan administration, whose first term began in 1981, asserted that the previous Carter administration had weakened U.S. diplomatic relationships with Cold War allies in Argentina and reversed the previous administration's official condemnation of the junta's human rights practices. The re-establishment of diplomatic ties allowed for CIA collaboration with the Argentine intelligence service in training and arming the Nicaraguan Contras against the Sandinista government. The 601 Intelligence Battalion, for example, trained Contras at Lepaterique base in Honduras.

U.S. corporations such as Ford Motor Company and Citibank also collaborated with the junta in the repression and disappearance of workers active in unions.

== French connection ==
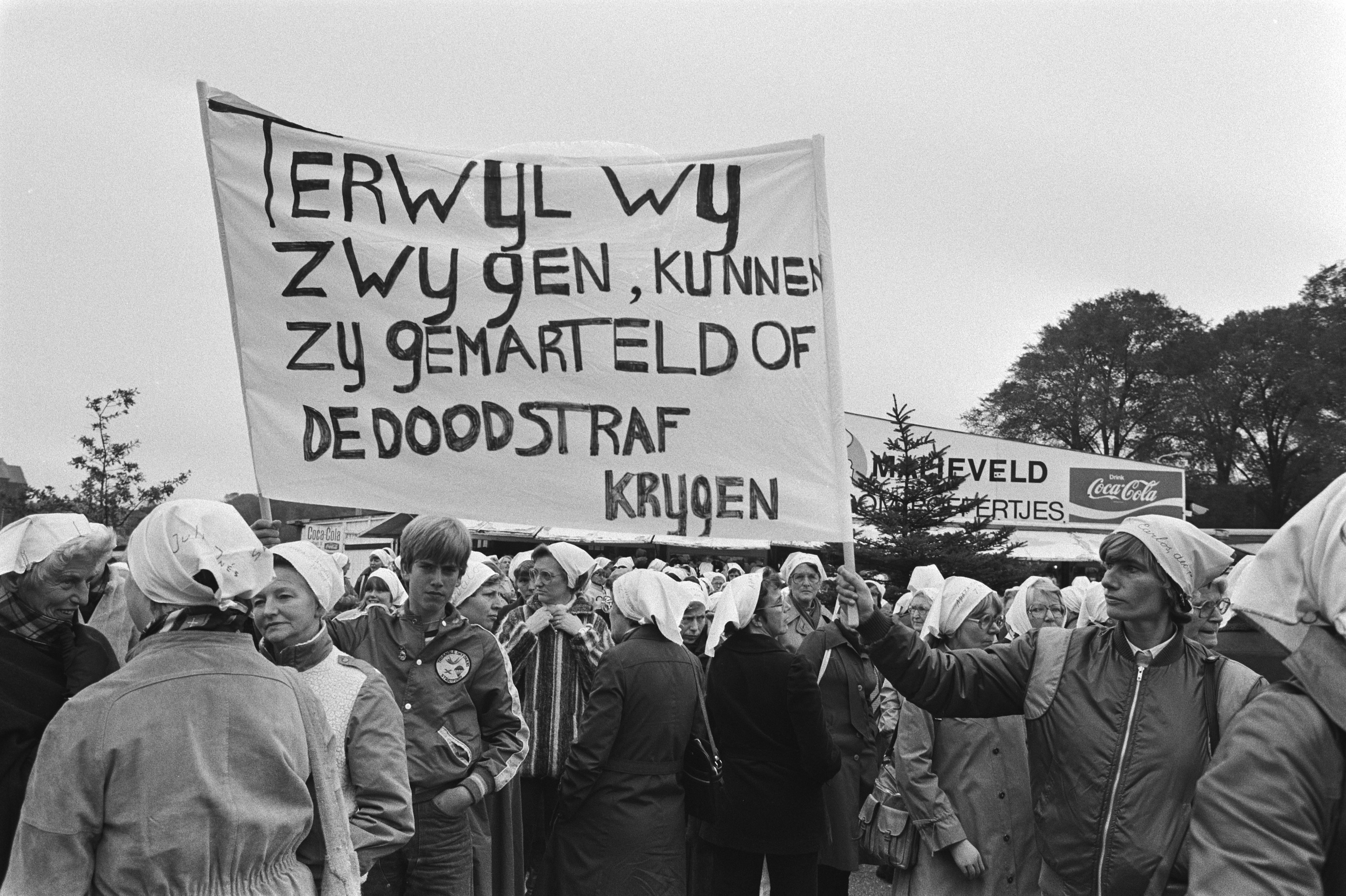
Demonstration in the Hague in solidarity with the Mothers of the Plaza del Mayo, 15 October 1981. The sign reads: "While we remain silent, they could be tortured or face the death penalty"

Investigating French military influence in Argentina, French journalist Marie-Monique Robin found in 2003 the original document proving that a 1959 agreement between Paris and Buenos Aires initiated a "permanent French military mission" in Argentina and reported on it (she found the document in the archives of the Quai d'Orsay, the French Ministry of Foreign Affairs). The mission was formed of veterans who had fought in the Algerian War and it was assigned to the offices of the chief of staff of the Argentine Armed Forces. It was continued until 1981, date of the election of socialist François Mitterrand.

After release of her documentary film Escadrons de la mort, l'école française in 2003 which explored the French connection with South American nations, Robin said in an interview with L'Humanité newspaper: "French have systematized a military technique in urban environment which would be copied and pasted to Latin American dictatorships." She noted that the French military had systematised the methods they used to suppress the insurgency during the 1957 Battle of Algiers and exported them to the War School in Buenos Aires. Roger Trinquier's famous book on counter-insurgency had a very strong influence in South America. In addition, Robin said she was shocked to learn that the DST French intelligence agency gave DINA the names of refugees who returned to Chile (Operation Retorno) from France during their counterinsurgency. All of these Chileans have been killed: "Of course, this puts in cause [sic – this makes responsible] the French government, and Giscard d'Estaing, then President of the Republic. I was very shocked by the duplicity of the French diplomatic position which, on one hand, received with open arms the political refugees, and, on the other hand, collaborated with the dictatorships".

On 10 September 2003, Green members of parliament Noël Mamère, Martine Billard and Yves Cochet filed a request to form a Parliamentary Commission to examine the "role of France in the support of military regimes in Latin America from 1973 to 1984" before the Foreign Affairs Commission of the National Assembly, presided by Edouard Balladur (UMP). Apart from Le Monde, French newspapers did not report this request. UMP deputy Roland Blum, in charge of the commission, refused to let Marie-Monique Robin testify on this topic. The Commission in December 2003 published a 12-page report claiming that the French had never signed a military agreement with Argentina.

When Minister of Foreign Affairs Dominique de Villepin travelled to Chile in February 2003, he claimed that no co-operation between France and the military regimes had occurred. People in Argentina were outraged when they saw the 2003 film, which included three generals defending their actions during the Dirty War. Due to public pressure, President Néstor Kirchner ordered the military to bring charges against the three for justifying the crimes of the dictatorship. They were Albano Hargindeguy, Reynaldo Bignone and Ramón Genaro Díaz Bessone.

The next year, Robin published her book under the same title Escadrons de la mort: l'école française (Death Squads: The French School, 2004), revealing more material. She showed how Valéry Giscard d'Estaing's government secretly collaborated with Videla's junta in Argentina and with Augusto Pinochet's regime in Chile. Alcides Lopez Aufranc was among the first Argentine officers to go in 1957 to Paris to study for two years at the Ecole de Guerre military school, two years before the Cuban Revolution and when no Argentine guerrillas existed:

In practice, declared Robin to Página/12, the arrival of the French in Argentina led to a massive extension of intelligence services and of the use of torture as the primary weapon of the anti-subversive war in the concept of modern warfare.

The annihilation decrees signed by Isabel Perón had been inspired by French texts. During the Battle of Algiers, the police forces were put under the authority of the Army. 30,000 persons were "disappeared" in Algeria. Reynaldo Bignone, named President of the Argentine junta in July 1982, said in Robin's film: "The March 1976 order of battle is a copy of the Algerian battle." The same statements were made by Generals Albano Harguindeguy, Videla's Interior Minister; and Diaz Bessone, former Minister of Planification and ideologue of the junta. The French military would transmit to their Argentine counterparts the notion of an "internal enemy" and the use of torture, death squads and quadrillages (grids).

Marie-Monique Robin also demonstrated that since the 1930s, there had been ties between the French far-right and Argentina, in particular through the Catholic fundamentalist organisation Cité catholique, created by Jean Ousset, a former secretary of Charles Maurras, the founder of the royalist Action Française movement. La Cité edited a review, Le Verbe, which influenced militaries during the Algerian War, notably by justifying the use of torture. At the end of the 1950s, the Cité catholique founded groups in Argentina and organised cells in the Army. It greatly expanded during the government of General Juan Carlos Onganía, in particular in 1969. The key figure of the Cité catholique in Argentina was priest Georges Grasset, who became Videla's personal confessor. He had been the spiritual guide of the Organisation armée secrète (OAS), the pro-French Algeria terrorist movement founded in Franquist Spain.

Robin believes that this Catholic fundamentalist current in the Argentine Army contributed to the importance and length of the French-Argentine co-operation. In Buenos Aires, Georges Grasset maintained links with Archbishop Marcel Lefebvre, founder of Society of St. Pius X in 1970, who was excommunicated in 1988. The Society of St. Pius X has four monasteries in Argentina, the largest one in La Reja. A French priest from there said to Marie-Monique Robin: "To save the soul of a Communist priest, one must kill him." Luis Roldan, former Secretary of Cult under Carlos Menem, President of Argentina from 1989 to 1999, was presented by Dominique Lagneau, the priest in charge of the monastery, to Robin as "Mr. Cité catholique in Argentina". Bruno Genta and Juan Carlos Goyeneche represent this ideology.

Antonio Caggiano, archbishop of Buenos Aires from 1959 to 1975, wrote a prologue to Jean Ousset's 1961 Spanish version of Le Marxisme-léninisme. Caggiano said that "Marxism is the negation of Christ and his Church" and referred to a Marxist conspiracy to take over the world, for which it was necessary to "prepare for the decisive battle".

Argentine Admiral Luis María Mendía, who had started the practice of "death flights", testified in January 2007 before Argentine judges, that a French intelligence agent, Bertrand de Perseval, had participated in the abduction of the two French nuns, Léonie Duquet and Alice Domont. Perseval, who lives today in Thailand, denied any links with the abduction. He has admitted being a former member of the OAS and having escaped from Algeria after the March 1962 Évian Accords put an end to the Algerian War (1954–1962).

During the 2007 hearings, Luis María Mendía referred to material presented in Robin's documentary, titled The Death Squads – the French School (2003). He asked the Argentine Court to call numerous French officials to testify to their actions: former French President Valéry Giscard d'Estaing, former French Premier Pierre Messmer, former French ambassador to Buenos Aires Françoise de la Gosse, and all officials in place in the French embassy in Buenos Aires between 1976 and 1983. Besides this "French connection", María Mendía also charged former head of state Isabel Perón and former ministers Carlos Ruckauf and Antonio Cafiero, who had signed the "anti-subversion decrees" before Videla's 1976 coup. According to Graciela Dalo, a survivor of the ESMA interrogations, Mendía was trying to establish that these crimes were legitimate, as the 1987 Obediencia Debida Act claimed them to be and further that the ESMA actions had been committed under Isabel Perón's "anti-subversion decrees" (which would give them a formal appearance of legality, although torture is forbidden by the Argentine Constitution). Alfredo Astiz also referred to the "French connexion" when testifying in court.

== Truth commission and decrees revoked ==
The junta relinquished power in 1983. After democratic elections, President elect Raúl Alfonsín created the National Commission on the Disappearance of Persons (CONADEP) in December 1983, led by writer Ernesto Sábato, to collect evidence of Dirty War crimes. The gruesome details, including documentation of the disappearance of nearly 9,000 people identified by name, shocked the world. Jorge Rafael Videla, head of the junta, was among the generals convicted of human rights crimes, including forced disappearances, torture, murders and kidnappings. President Alfonsín ordered that the nine members of the military junta be judicially charged during the 1985 Trial of the Juntas. As of 2010, most of the military officials were in trial or jail. In 1985, Videla was sentenced to life imprisonment at the military prison of Magdalena. Several senior officers also received jail terms. In the Prologue to the Nunca Más report ("Never Again"), Ernesto Sábato wrote:

From the moment of their abduction, the victims lost all rights. Deprived of all communication with the outside world, held in unknown places, subjected to barbaric torture, kept ignorant of their immediate or ultimate fate, they risked being either thrown into a river or the sea, weighted down with blocks of cement, or burned to ashes. They were not mere objects, however, and still possessed all the human attributes: they could feel pain, could remember a mother, child or spouse, could feel infinite shame at being raped in public.

Reacting to the human rights trials, hardliners in the Argentine army staged a series of uprisings against the Alfonsín government. They barricaded themselves in several military barracks, demanding an end to the trials. During Holy Week (Semana Santa) in April 1987, Lieutenant Colonel Aldo Rico (commander of the 18th Infantry Regiment in Misiones province) and several junior army officers barricaded themselves in the Campo de Mayo army barracks. The military rebels, called the carapintadas, demanded an end to the trials and the resignation of army chief of staff General Héctor Ríos Ereñú. Rico believed that the Alfonsin government would be unwilling or unable to put down the uprising. He was partially correct in that the Second Army Corps commander's orders to surround the barracks were ignored by his subordinates. Alfonsin called on the people to come to the Plaza de Mayo to defend democracy; hundreds of thousands answered his call.

After a helicopter visit by Alfonsin to Campo de Mayo, the rebels finally surrendered. There were denials of a deal, but several generals were forced into early retirement and General Jose Dante Caridi soon replaced Erenu as commander of the army. In January 1988, a second military rebellion took place when Rico refused to accept the detention orders issued by a military court for having led the previous uprising. This time he barricaded himself in the 4th Infantry Regiment in Monte Caseros and rejected Caridi's calls to turn himself in. Rico again demanded an end to the human rights trials, saying Alfonsin's promises to the rebels had not been fulfilled. Caridi ordered several army units to suppress the rebellion. Their advance to the Monte Caseros barracks was slowed by rain and reports that rebel soldiers had laid mines which had wounded three loyal officers. Nevertheless, Rico's forces were defeated after a three-hour battle. They surrendered on 17 January 1988, and 300 rebels were arrested and sentenced to prison terms.

A third uprising took place in December 1988. This time the uprising was led by Lieutenant-Colonel Mohammed Alí Seineldín and supported by 1,000 rebel troops. This uprising proved successful. Several of Seineldín's and his followers' demands were agreed to. Caridi was forced into retirement and replaced by General Francisco Gassino, who had served in the Falklands War and was held in high esteem by the carapintadas. On 5 October 1989, as part of sweeping reforms, newly elected President Carlos Menem pardoned those convicted in the human right trials and the rebel leaders imprisoned for taking part in the military uprisings.

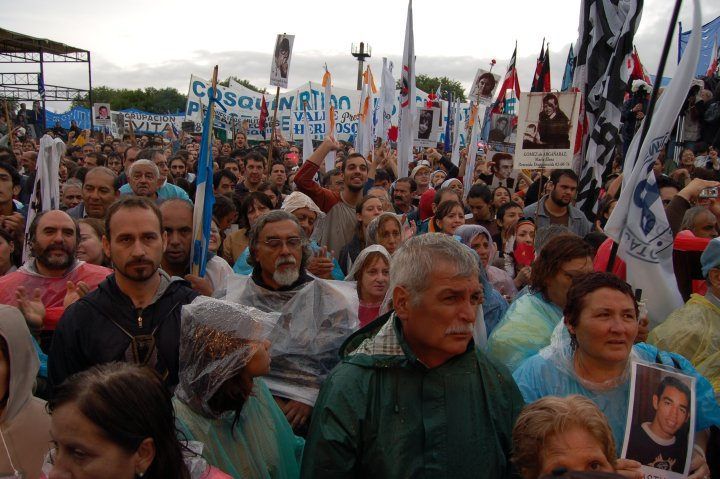
Commemoration in Argentina

Foreign governments whose citizens were victims of the Dirty War (which included citizens of Czechoslovakia, Italy, Sweden, Finland, Spain, Germany, the United States, the United Kingdom, Paraguay, Bolivia, Chile, Uruguay, Peru and several other nations) are pressing individual cases against the former military regime. France has sought the extradition of Captain Alfredo Astiz for the kidnapping and murder of its nationals, among them nuns Léonie Duquet and Alice Domon.

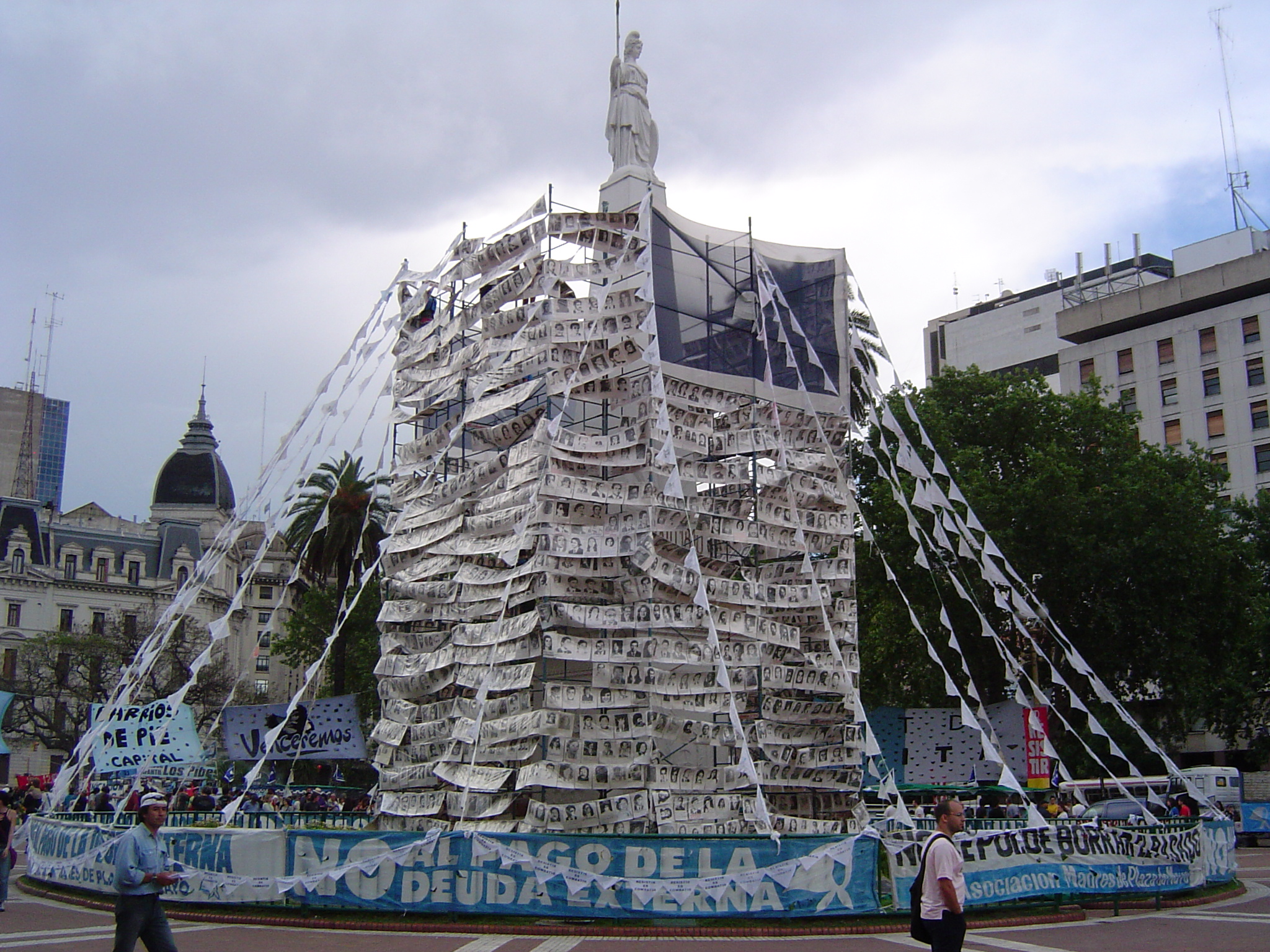
Pirámide de Mayo covered with photos of the desaparecidos by the Mothers of the Plaza de Mayo in 2004

== Continuing controversies ==
On 23 January 1989, an armed group of around 40 guerrillas, a faction of the Movimiento Todos por la Patria (MTP or All for the Fatherland Movement), attacked the La Tablada army barracks on the outskirts of Buenos Aires to "prevent" a military coup. The attack resulted in 28 of the guerrillas killed, 5 "disappeared" and 13 imprisoned. 11 police and military died, and 53 were wounded in the fighting. The guerrillas claimed to have acted to prevent a military coup. Among the dead at La Tablada was Jorge Baños, a human rights lawyer who had joined the guerrillas. The MTP attack to prevent a military coup has been suspected to be led by infiltrated Intelligence military service.

In 2002, Máxima, daughter of Jorge Zorreguieta, a civilian cabinet minister of Argentina during the early phase of the Dictatorship, married Willem-Alexander, crown prince of the Netherlands. All of the Netherlands had wrestled in controversy over her suitability, but ultimately the marriage took place without the presence of her parents. Máxima thus became Queen when her husband ascended to the throne in 2013. In August 2016, Argentine President Mauricio Macri was widely condemned by human rights groups for calling into question the number of 30,000 disappeared and for referring to the period as a "Dirty War".

During the Argentine Bicentennial Independence Celebrations (on 9 July 2016), former Colonel Carlos Carrizo Salvadores drew criticism from the left for leading the march of Falklands War veterans and Veterans of Operation Independence, the counterinsurgency campaign in Northern Argentina. Carrizo Salvadores had been sentenced to life imprisonment in 2013 for his part as a paratrooper captain in the so-called Rosario Chapel massacre in Catamarca Province but was acquitted under the new government of Mauricio Macri.

In 2016, a group of Argentinian-Israelis filed a freedom of information request to demand the Israeli government release all documents on military and diplomatic ties between Israel and the junta since it is believed that Israel supported the military dictatorship.

On 16 November 2023, it was revealed that Luis Kyburg, a former Argentinean naval officer who was believed to have killed at least 150 people during the Dirty War, died in Berlin. He had been living in Berlin since 2013 and his death, which was revealed to have happened in October, came three weeks before he was scheduled to face trial for 23 of the murders he was accused of committing during the Dirty War.

== Repeal of Pardon Laws and renewal of prosecutions ==
Under Néstor Kirchner's term as president in 2003, the Argentine Congress revoked the longstanding amnesty laws, also called the Pardon Laws. In 2005, the Argentine Supreme Court ruled these laws were unconstitutional. The government re-opened prosecution of war crimes. From then through October 2011, 259 persons were convicted for crimes against humanity and genocide and sentenced in Argentine courts, including Alfredo Astiz, a notorious torturer, that month.

In 2006, 24 March was designated as a public holiday in Argentina, the Day of Remembrance for Truth and Justice. That year on the 30th anniversary of the coup, a huge crowd filled the streets to remember what happened during the military government and ensure it did not happen again.

In 2006, the government began its first trials of military and security officers since the repeal of the "Pardon Laws". Miguel Etchecolatz, the police commissioner of the province of Buenos Aires in the 1970s, faced trial on charges of illegal detention, torture and homicide. He was found guilty of six counts of murder, six counts of unlawful imprisonment and seven counts of torture and sentenced in September 2006 to life imprisonment.

In February 2006, some former Ford Argentine workers sued the U.S.-based company, alleging that local managers worked with the security forces to detain union members on the premises and torture them. The civil suit against Ford Motor Company and Ford Argentina called for four former company executives and a retired military officer to be questioned. According to Pedro Norberto Troiani, one of the plaintiffs, 25 employees were detained in the plant, located 40 miles (60 km) from Buenos Aires. Allegations have surfaced since 1998 that Ford officials were involved in state repression, but the company has denied the claims. Army personnel were reported to have arrived at the plant on the day of the military coup on 24 March 1976 and "disappearances" immediately started.

On 14 December 2007, some 200 men who were at military service during the dictatorship demanded an audience with the governor of Tucumán Province, claiming they too were victims of the Junta as they had no choice and suffered hunger, abandonment, physical and psychological injuries, demanding a military pension.

In February 2010, a German court issued an international arrest warrant for former dictator Jorge Videla in connection with the death of 20-year-old Rolf Stawowiok in Argentina. He was a German citizen born in Argentina while his father was doing development work there. Rolf Stawowiok disappeared on 21 February 1978. In earlier cases, France, Italy and Spain had requested extradition of the Navy captain Alfredo Astiz for war crimes related to his work with ESMA but were never successful.

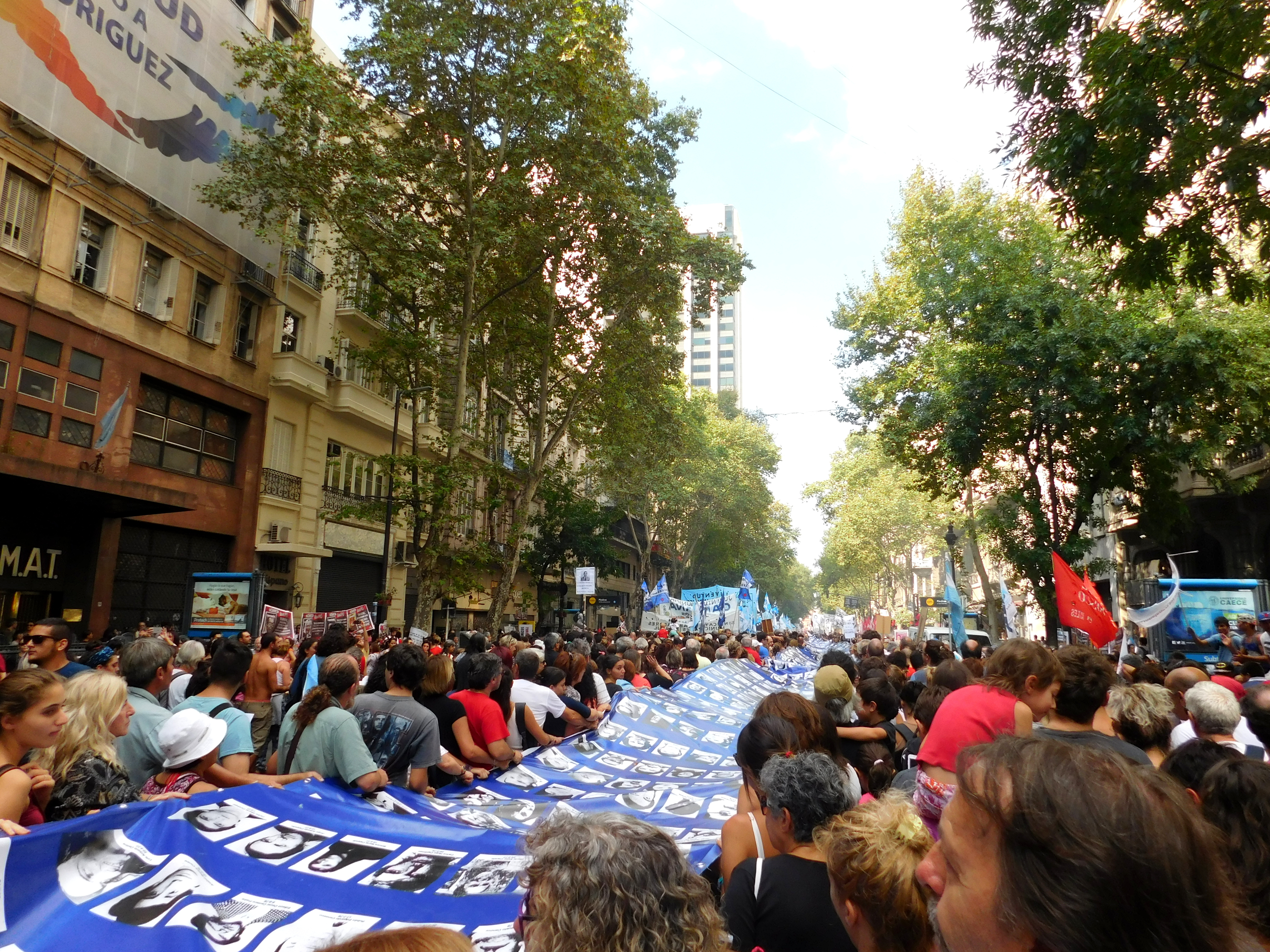
Flag with images of those who disappeared during a demonstration in Buenos Aires to commemorate the 40th anniversary of the 1976 coup in Argentina

In 1977, General Albano Harguindeguy, Interior Minister, admitted that 5,618 people disappeared in the form of PEN detenidos-desaparecidos were being held in detention camps throughout Argentina. According to a secret cable from DINA (Chilean secret police) in Buenos Aires, an estimate by the Argentine 601st Intelligence Battalion in mid-July 1978, which started counting victims in 1975, gave the figure of 22,000 persons – this document was first published by John Dinges in 2004.

== Participation of Catholic Church members ==
On 15 April 2005, a human rights lawyer filed a criminal complaint against Cardinal Jorge Bergoglio (who later became Pope Francis), accusing him of conspiring with the junta in 1976 to kidnap two Jesuit priests. So far, no hard evidence has been presented linking the cardinal to this crime. It is known that the cardinal headed the Society of Jesus of Argentina in 1976 and had asked the two priests to leave their pastoral work following conflict within the Society over how to respond to the new military dictatorship, with some priests advocating a violent overthrow. The cardinal's spokesman flatly denied the allegations.

It has since been revealed that Cardinal Bergoglio made efforts behind the scenes to save and evacuate suspected dissidents who faced persecution by the Argentine military Junta when he was the head of the Jesuits. It is estimated that during his time as the head of the Jesuits Bergoglio saved the lives of over 1,000 dissidents. The Mothers of the Plaza De Mayo, initially harsh critics of Bergoglio, would end up reconciling with him when he became Pope, with their leader Hebe Bonafini saying he is "with the people".

A priest, Christian von Wernich, was chaplain of the Buenos Aires Provincial Police while it was under the command of General Ramón Camps during the dictatorship, with the rank of inspector. On 9 October 2007, he was found guilty of complicity in 7 homicides, 42 kidnappings and 32 instances of torture and sentenced to life imprisonment.

Some Catholic priests sympathised with and helped the Montoneros. Radical priests, including Father Alberto Carbone, who was eventually indicted in the murder of Aramburu, preached Marxism and presented the early Church fathers as model revolutionaries in an attempt to legitimise the violence. A Catholic youth leader, Juan Ignacio Isla Casares, with the help of the Montoneros commander Eduardo Pereira Rossi (nom de guerre "El Carlón") was the mastermind behind the ambush and killing of five policemen near San Isidro Cathedral on 26 October 1975.

Mario Firmenich, who later became the leader of the Montoneros, was the ex-president of the Catholic Action Youth Group and a former seminarian himself. The Montoneros had ties with the Movement of Priests for the Third World and a Jesuit priest, Carlos Mugica.

== The United States Declassification Project on Argentina ==
According to its front page, The United States Declassification Project on Argentina "represents a historic effort by United States government departments and agencies to identify, review, and provide public access to records that shed light on human rights abuses in Argentina between 1975 and 1984". The project was announced by President Barack Obama in 2016 after a request from Argentine President Mauricio Macri and human rights groups on the 40th anniversary of the 1976 military coup in Argentina. The documents were released in three tranches, in August 2016, December 2016 and April 2019. Gastón Chillier, of the Cels human rights group said "There are documents from six or seven different US intelligence agencies. We're hopeful there may be information there that could help in the continuing trials against human rights offenders from the period." Contained within the documents are descriptions of the methods used by the Argentine dictatorship to kill its victims and dispose of their bodies. In addition, during his 2016 visit to Argentina, President Obama said that the United States "was too slow" to condemn human rights atrocities during the military junta years but stopped short of apologising for Washington's early support for the military government.

== Art, entertainment and media ==
=== Books ===
- Argentina Betrayed: Memory, Mourning, and Accountability, by Antonius C. G. M. Robben (2018)
- Dirty Secrets, Dirty War: The Exile of Editor Robert J. Cox, by David Cox (2008).
- The Ministry of Special Cases, novel by Nathan Englander (2007).
- La Historia Oficial (English: The Official Story), revisionist critique by Nicolás Márquez (2006).
- Political Violence and Trauma in Argentina, by Antonius C.G.M. Robben (2005).
- Escadrons de la mort, l'école française, by Marie-Monique Robin (Paris: La Découverte, 2004)
- Guerrillas and Generals: The Dirty War in Argentina, by Paul H. Lewis (2001).
- Suite argentina (English: Argentine Suite. Translated by Donald A. Yates. Online: Words Without Borders, October 2010) Four short stories by Edgar Brau (2000).
- God's Assassins: State Terrorism in Argentina in the 1970s by M. Patricia Marchak (1999).
- A Lexicon of Terror: Argentina and the Legacies of Torture, by Marguerite Feitlowitz (1999).
- Una sola muerte numerosa (English: A Single, Numberless Death), by Nora Strejilevich (1997).
- The Flight: Confessions of an Argentine Dirty Warrior, by Horacio Verbitsky (1996).
- Argentina's Lost Patrol: Armed Struggle, 1969–1979, by María José Moyano (1995).
- Dossier Secreto: Argentina's Desaparecidos and the Myth of the "Dirty War", by Martin Edwin Andersen (1993).
- Argentina's "Dirty War": An Intellectual Biography, by Donald C. Hodges (1991).
- Behind the Disappearances: Argentina's Dirty War Against Human Rights and the United Nations, by Iain Guest (1990).
- The Little School: Tales of Disappearance & Survival in Argentina, by Alicia Partnoy (1989).
- Argentina, 1943–1987: The National Revolution and Resistance, by Donald C. Hodges (1988).
- Soldiers of Perón: Argentina's Montoneros, by Richard Gillespie (1982).
- Guerrilla warfare in Argentina and Colombia, 1974–1982, by Bynum E. Weathers Jr. (1982).
- Prisoner without a Name, Cell without a Number, by Jacobo Timerman (1981).
- Guerrilla politics in Argentina, by Kenneth F. Johnson (1975).
- La ligne bleue (English: The Blue Line), by Ingrid Betancourt (2014).
- Guerra Sucia, by Nathaniel Kirby (2011).
- Los sapos de la memoria, by Graciela Bialet (1997)
- Perla, by Carolina de Robertis (2012)

=== Films ===
- Ico, el caballito valiente (1983), directed by Manuel García Ferré. allusion to events.
- The Official Story (1985), directed by Luis Puenzo. Movie related to the "stolen babies" case.
- Night of the Pencils (1986), directed by Héctor Olivera.
- A Wall of Silence (1993), directed by Lita Stantic
- Garage Olimpo (1999), directed by Marco Bechis.
- Figli/Hijos (2001), directed by Marco Bechis.
- Kamchatka (2002), directed by Marcelo Piñeyro.
- Los Rubios (2003), directed by Albertina Carri.
- The Death Squads: The French School (2003), by Marie-Monique Robin (book and film).
- Cautiva (2003), directed by Gaston Biraben. Movie related to the "stolen babies" case.
- Imagining Argentina (2003), directed by Christopher Hampton.
- Burnt Oranges (2005), directed by Silvia Malagrino, written by Monica Flores Correa, and edited by Sharon Karp.
- Crónica de una fuga (2006), directed by Israel Adrián Caetano. Movie related to the Mansión Sere case.
- The Disappeared (2007), directed by Peter Sanders.
- Our Disappeared (2008), directed by Juan Mandelbaum.
- The Secret in Their Eyes (2009), directed by Juan José Campanella.
- Where Is My Grandchild? (2015), documentary by Retro Report about the Grandmothers of the Plaza de Mayo.
- The Two Popes (2019), directed by Fernando Meirelles.
- Azor (2021), directed by Andreas Fontana.
- Argentina, 1985 (2022), directed by Santiago Mitre.
- They Shot the Piano Player (2023), directed by Fernando Trueba and Javier Mariscal.

== See also ==
- Armed Forces of the Argentine Republic
- Films depicting Latin American military dictatorships
- Héctor Germán Oesterheld, a comic book artist who disappeared during the Dirty War and was presumed dead in 1977
- Operation Gladio
- Maria Eugenia Sampallo
- National Reorganization Process
- Disappeared Detainees of the Dirty War
- National Commission on the Disappearance of Persons
- Detenidos Desaparecidos
- Jacobo Timerman
- Montoneros
- People's Revolutionary Army (Argentina)
- Grandmothers of Plaza de Mayo
- Mothers of Plaza de Mayo
- Josefina García de Noia
