= Our Disappeared =

- Spanish: Nuestros Desaparecidos
- Directed by: Juan Mandelbaum
- Written by: Juan Mandelbaum
- Starring: Alejandra Dixon
- Production company: Geovision
- Distributed by: MercuryMedia International
- Release date: 2008
- Running time: 99 minutes
- Country: Argentina
- Language: Spanish

Our Disappeared / Nuestros Desaparecidos is an Argentinian documentary film about the desaparecidos (the "disappeared ones") in Argentina. Written, produced and directed by Juan Mandelbaum. It is in English and Spanish with English subtitles. Another version of the film exists in Spanish and English with Spanish subtitles. Its running time is 1 hour and 39 minutes.

== Synopsis ==
Our Disappeared / Nuestros Desaparecidos is director Juan Mandelbaum’s personal search for friends and loved ones who were caught in the vise of the military and “disappeared” in his native Argentina during the 1976–1983 military dictatorship. The film is a personal journey into the past to reflect on the political and personal contexts that led so many young people to fight for a more just Argentina.

After finding out that Patricia, a long lost girlfriend, is among the “desaparecidos” Mandelbaum returns to Argentina to find out what happened to her and others he knew who also disappeared. As he revisits the dreams they shared for a revolution that would transform Argentina he grieves the tragic losses and examines his own choices: not signing up with any of the radical groups at his university and leaving Argentina in 1977 at the height of the repression, to escape the pervasive climate of fear. Using extraordinary archival footage, Mandelbaum brings the energy and tension of the time and place to life.

In this return voyage to Argentina’s past, Mandelbaum learns much about his friends’ stories, and about his own. Thirty years after the military coup, Mandelbaum explores what happens when brutal regimes attack the fabric of a country.

== Credits ==
Written, Produced and Directed by Juan Mandelbaum

Edited and Co-Produced by David Carnochan

Director of Photography Vicente Franco

Music Composed by Gustavo Moretto

== Festivals and screenings ==
Our Disappeared / Nuestros Desaparecidos has appeared at numerous film festivals, museums and cultural centers, including:

CINE Golden Eagle Competition, Museum of Fine Arts, Boston, Los Angeles Latino International Film Festival, Santa Barbara International Film Festival, New York Jewish Film Festival, Human Rights Watch International Film Festival, Museum of Modern Art, New York, Worcester Latino Film Festival, Cartagena International Film Festival, Colombia, Athens International Film + Video Festival, Chicago Latino Film Festival, Finger Lakes Environmental Film Festival, Syracuse International Film Festival, Berkshire International Film Festival, Skirball Cultural Center, Los Angeles

It aired on the television series Independent Lens in September 2009.

== Articles and reviews ==
Our Disappeared review by Robert Koehler, Variety (September 29, 2008)

Grieving the Personal and the Political Losses of a Revolution by Wesley Morris, The Boston Globe (October 16, 2008)

Our Disappeared Revisits a Dark Chapter in Argentina's History by Reed Johnson, Los Angeles Times (September 12, 2008)

Searching for the Disappeared by Linda Matchan, The Boston Globe (October 12, 2008)

Brookline Filmmaker Turns Lens on Argentina's Vanished Residents by Ed Symkus, The Brookline Tab (October 16, 2008)

(Spanish) Documental Nuestros Desaparecidos: La Necesidad de Remover el Pasado by Virginia Gómez, TuBoston.com (October 3, 2008)

== Awards ==
CINE Golden Eagle Award

Gerald Peary's Top 10 of 2008 for The Boston Phoenix
