= The Little School =

1986 novel by Alicia Partnoy

- First edition
- Author: Alicia Partnoy
- Language: English
- Genre: Novel
- Publisher: Midnight Editions
- Publication date: 1986
- Publication place: Argentina
- Pages: 136
- ISBN: 1-57344-029-9
- OCLC: 40178370

The Little School is a novel written by Alicia Partnoy, a woman who was "disappeared" during the Dirty War period of the history of Argentina. It is an account of a clandestine detention center. She tells of all the people that she met and saw through a tiny hole in her blindfold. The guards made sure prisoners of The Little School did not talk with each other or see each other. Prisoners were beaten and tortured for almost any reason and many were killed.

Military regimes are not at all unusual in Argentina but those that ruled from 1976 to 1979 were unique in the number of civilians, mostly young people, who were kidnapped, jailed, tortured, and/or murdered because of their political beliefs. Early in 1977, the author was taken into custody by the army and sent to "the little school," one of many camps where dissidents were "taught" their "lessons". Imprisoned without charges, she spent almost a year blindfolded and bound, cut off from friends and family, including her child, until being inexplicably released. Partnoy's glimpses of her life in prison are understandably disjointed and meandering, but they stand as a record of character and fortitude.

It is the small details that make these stories so heartbreaking. A child's nursery rhyme that runs endlessly through the mind of one prisoner while being tortured. A friend's jacket that shields the guard's blows once that friend is removed from the school, possibly killed. A broken tooth kept in a matchbox that reminds one prisoner she is still "whole." The glimpses of life another prisoner catches through the bottom of the blindfold, where it doesn't quite lay flat against her cheeks. The sheer delight in catching raindrops in the palm of a hand where the window leaks during a storm.

== See also ==
- Clandestine detention center (Argentina)
