= César Augusto Guzzetti =

Argentine sailor

César Augusto Guzzetti (6 September 1925 – 1988) was an officer in the Argentine Navy who rose the rank of vice admiral. After the 1976 coup d'état that overthrew the government of Isabel Perón, Guzzetti became the first foreign minister of the military government presided by Lieutenant General Jorge Rafael Videla.

Guzzetti was appointed as foreign minister on 30 March 1976. In October of that year, he met with Henry Kissinger, the United States Secretary of State, who expressed support for the new military government of Argentina and its efforts to root out leftist insurgents ("Dirty War"). On 7 May 1977, operatives of the leftist guerrilla group Montoneros ambushed Guzzetti in a hospital waiting room in Buenos Aires, shot him in the head, and left him for dead. Guzzetti received extensive medical treatment and survived, but he was left mute and quadriplegic. On 27 May, he was replaced as foreign minister by another vice admiral, Óscar Antonio Montes.
