= Alicia Partnoy =

Argentinian human rights activist, and poet

Alicia Mabel Partnoy (born 1955 in Bahía Blanca, Argentina) is a human rights activist, poet, college professor, and translator.

After Argentinian President Juan Perón died, the students from the left of the Peronist political party organized with fervor within the country's universities and, along with workers, were persecuted and imprisoned. There was a military coup in 1976 and people began to disappear. Partnoy was one of those who suffered through the ordeals of becoming a political prisoner. She became an activist of the Peronist Youth Movement while attending Southern National University (see Education).

She was taken from her home, leaving behind her 18-month-old daughter, on January 12, 1977, by the Argentinian Army and imprisoned at a concentration camp named The Little School (La Escuelita). For three and a half months, Partnoy was blindfolded. She was brutally beaten, starved, molested, and forced to live in inhuman conditions. She was moved from the concentration camp to the prison of Villa Floresta in Bahía Blanca where she stayed for six months only to be transferred to Villa Devoto prison in Buenos Aires. She spent two and a half years as a prisoner of conscience, with no charges.

In 1979, she was forced to leave the country, coming to the U.S. as a refugee with her daughter where they were reunited with her husband in Seattle, Washington. In 1985, she told her story of what had happened to her at The Little School in an eponymous book. The world began to open its eyes to the treatment of women in reference to the disappearances of Latin Americans.

Alicia Partnoy has testified before the United Nations, the Organization of American States, Amnesty International, and the Argentine Human Rights Commission. Her testimony is recorded in a compilation of testimonials by the National Commission for the Investigation of the Disappeared. She currently lives in Los Angeles, California, CA and teaches at Loyola Marymount University.

In June 2007, a collection of her poems appeared in the second issue of the avant-garde Hebrew poetry and criticism magazine Daka rendered by Eran Tzelgov.

== Education ==
Alicia Partnoy worked towards a bachelor's degree in Literature at the Universidad Nacional del Sur, in Bahía Blanca, Argentina. After her three years as a political prisoner, once in exile, she continued her studies at the University of the District of Columbia and at the American University, where she obtained a Certificate in Translation. She holds a Master's degree and a PhD from the Catholic University of America.

== Career ==
Over the years, Alicia Partnoy has served as part-time lecturer and visiting professor at several institutions. Since 1998 she has been at Loyola Marymount University in Los Angeles, California, where she is a professor in the Department of Modern Languages and Literatures.

== Publications ==
Alicia Partnoy is the author, translator or editor of twelve books and a chapbook.

Partnoy's most famous work is her book The Little School: Tales of Disappearance and Survival in Argentina, written originally in Spanish (La Escuelita: Relatos testimoniales), but published in her home country, Argentina, twenty years after the English edition was released in the U.S. and England. A French translation has been published by Zinnia Editions, and a Bengali translation by an alternative publishing house in Kolkata, was published in 2015. A Hebrew translation is forthcoming.

Partnoy also authored the following poetry collections: Flowering Fires / Fuegos florales, Venganza de la manzana / Revenge of the Apple, and Volando bajito / Little Low Flying, as well as the chapbook Ecos lógicos y otros poemares and, with her daughter Ruth Irupé Sanabria, the children's book ¡Escuchá! Cuentos y versitos para los más chiquitos, which includes poetry and short stories sent to Ruth from the Villa Devoto prison where her mother was held prisoner.

Additionally, Partnoy edited the books Para mi hija Silvia / For My Daughter Silvia (by author Evangelina Arce, a mother of Ciudad Juarez), Las ramas hacia el mundo: antología familiar, You Can't Drown the Fire: Latin American Women Writing in Exile, and, with Christina Fialho and Kristina Shull, Call Me Libertad: Poems between Borders.

Partnoy has written numerous academic articles and has contributed chapters to Women Writing Resistance: Essays on Latin America and the Caribbean, Loss and Hope: Global, Interreligious and Interdisciplinary Perspectives, and Representing Humanity in an Age of Terror.

Partnoy most recently co-authored with Martina Ramirez Happier as a Woman: Transforming Friendships, Transforming Lives.

== Recognition and awards ==
Alicia Partnoy's poetry collection Flowering Fires / Fuegos florales translated into English by Gail Wronsky, received the First Settlement House American Poetry Prize in 2014. The Washington Independent Review of Books selected it as one of the Best 18 Books of and About Poetry of 2015.

The Little School was included in The London Times Best Sellers List in 1987. It was selected as Writer's Choice of the Pushcart Foundation, twice, by Bobbie Ann Mason and Tobias Wolff. In Argentina, in 2011 the Spanish language edition received the Special Jury Prize/Elegidos Alija (Argentine Section of IBBY-International Board on Books for Young People) and it won CONABIP's bid (Argentine National Commission for Public Libraries) to be selected as one of 137 titles to be purchased and donated to Argentina's 1,100 public libraries.

Most recently, it was selected as “the book” for the Santa Barbara City College Program SBCC Reads in 2018.

Escuchá was selected by the Ministry of Culture of La Pampa, Argentina, to be donated to all public libraries in that province in 2017.

== Other achievements ==
Alicia Partnoy has lectured and read from her works at hundreds of venues in the U.S and abroad. Her creative works, testimonial texts, and scholarship denounce human rights violations in Latin America and in the world. Many of her works can be found on her official website .

== Personal life ==
After being separated from her husband and daughter in Argentina, Partnoy's family was finally reunited in 1979. She has three daughters – two born in the U.S., Eva and Anahí, and one born in Argentina, Ruth. Today, Ruth (full name Ruth Irupé Sanabria) is a poet. Partnoy lives in Los Angeles, California with her husband Antonio Leiva and currently teaches at Loyola Marymount University.
