= Ramón Genaro Díaz Bessone =

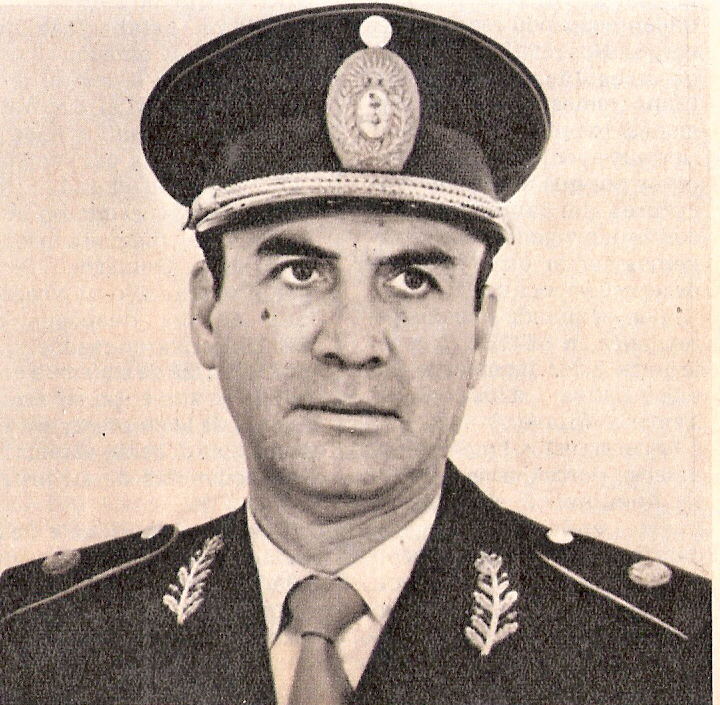
Ramón Díaz Bessone

Ramón Genaro Díaz Bessone (27 October 1925 - 3 June 2017) was an Argentinian military officer who served as Minister of Planning during the presidency of Jorge Rafael Videla between 1976 and 1977. In addition, he is known as the "theorist of the National Reorganization Process" due he was author of many books defending the dictatorship. He was one of the main figures of the Argentinian dictatorship as commander of an entire division of the Argentine Army.

He was sentenced of crimes against humanity after the recuperation of the democracy in Argentina after 1983, but pardoned by President Carlos Menem in 1999. Nevertheless, the pardon was revoked in 2005 and several trials against him began. He was sentenced to life in prison in 2012 as reponsable of the direction of detention centers in Rosario. During a TV interview with the French journalist Marie-Monique Robin he confessed as a need to combat the guerrilla groups.

He was born in Mendoza in 1925. During the National Reorganization Process he was the theoric developer of the developmentalism in contrast to the neo-liberal ideas of Videla's minister of Economy José Alfredo Martínez de Hoz. Also he was part of the sector known as "The Tough Ones" during the dictatorship known for their opposition to an opening with civil sectors.
