= Military coups in Argentina =

In Argentina, there were seven coups d'état during the 20th century: in 1930, 1943, 1955, 1962, 1966, 1976, and 1981. The first four established interim dictatorships, while the fifth and sixth established dictatorships of permanent type on the model of a bureaucratic-authoritarian state. The latter two conducted a Dirty War in the line of state terrorism, in which human rights were systematically violated and there were tens of thousands of forced disappearances.

In the 53 years since the first military coup in 1930, until the last dictatorship fell in 1983, the military ruled the country for 25 years, imposing 14 dictators under the title of "president", one every 1.7 years on average. In that period, the democratically elected governments (radicals, Peronists and radical-developmentalists) were interrupted by coups.

== Coup of 6 September 1930 ==
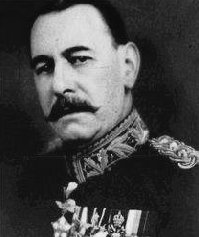
General José Félix Uriburu started a series of coups and military dictatorship that would extend until 1983.

The military coup of September 6, 1930 was led by General José Félix Uriburu and overthrew president Hipólito Yrigoyen of the Radical Civic Union, who had been democratically elected to exercise his second term in 1928. In an unprecedented move, Uriburu also dissolved Parliament. Paradoxically, General Uriburu had been one of the organizers of the Revolution of the Park, a civic-military uprising that gave rise to the Radical Civic Union.

On September 10, Uriburu was recognized as the "interim" president of the nation by the Supreme Court by the agreement that led to the doctrine of de facto governments and that would be used to legitimize all other military coups.

Following a trend which was repeated in future coups, Uriburu appointed a civilian as head of the Ministry of Economy, José S. Pérez, who had links with the large landowners and the more conservative factions.

The military leadership established a corporatist government and, for drafting the first proclamation, appointed the writer Leopoldo Lugones. Lugones had joined the fascist cause in 1924 by giving a speech called "The Hour of the Sword", where he declared the deterioration of democracy, its instability and its evolution towards demagoguery. One of Uriburu's first initiatives was to establish an illegal repressive state structure, creating a "special section" of the police which could be used to systematically torture his opponents and which was the first such police division to use the picana, originally for cattle, against its victims.

When Uriburu was unable to shore up the necessary political support to fully establish his fascist political regime, he called elections, but decided to prohibit the participation of the Radical Civic Union. The reinstituation of democracy was false, restricted and controlled by the Armed Forces. This electoral fraud gave rise to a period of conservative, corrupt governments which was dubbed the "Infamous Decade". On February 20, 1932, General Uriburu handed over power to General Agustín P. Justo, the true force behind the coup who, although involved in the coup, wanted a democratic and limited government.

== Coup of 4 June 1943 ==
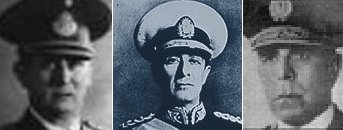
Generals Arturo Rawson, Pedro Pablo Ramírez and Edelmiro Farrell, the three consecutive dictators of the Revolution of '43.

The Revolution of '43 which started with a coup d'état by the military on June 4, 1943, was distinct from the other Argentine coups in the following ways:

- Ramón Castillo, the toppled president, was part of the conservative regime which ruled during the "Infamous Decade" and which originated in the coup of 1930 and was supported by fraudulent general elections, repression and corruption.
- It was the only military coup that unfolded in the midst of a world war.
- It did not establish a relationship with the important landowners and businessmen.
- Its outbreak was influenced by the pressure that the US was putting on Argentina to drop its position of neutrality with respect to World War II, with the goal of hurting British economic interests in the country and ultimately replacing the United Kingdom as the dominant economic power in Argentina.
- It was the only coup in Argentina which was executed purely by the military and with popular support.
- It was a true revolution in the sense that it toppled the conservative government with its fraudulent elections, established in 1930, and had the intention of being permanent.
- Just like all the other institutional breakdowns in Argentina, it was very damaging to democracy. Although eliminating the "patriotic election rigging" (fraude patriótico) of the previous decade, it continued with the line of harmful leaders in government.

The Revolution of '43 was a confusing political process during which various groups, many of whom had never played a role in Argentina's history, vied for power. The coup itself was not executed to permanently establish control, so it was a transitory dictatorship that followed.

All of the military groups fighting for power during the Revolution of '43 were markedly anti-communist and maintained strong ties to the Catholic Church which reestablished its presence (absent since the 19th century), especially in the area of education. Internal fighting unleashed two more coups, meaning there were three dictators succeeding each other in power and carrying the title of "president": Arturo Rawson, Pedro Pablo Ramírez and Edelmiro Farrell.

During this period, the Argentinian unions, mainly the socialists and the syndicalists as well as a few communists, formed an alliance with a group of young army officials led by the Colonel Juan Perón. This alliance constituted the successful nationalist labor movement which prevailed by winning popular support from the working class and which was given the name "Peronism". This period was characterized by extreme polarization of the social classes and led to the formation of a large social block that was strongly anti-Peronist and made up mostly of the middle class and upper class.

Economically, the Revolution of '43 saw the continuation of the policy of Import Substitution Industrialization.

The dictatorship ended with a call for democratic elections on February 24, 1946, which all the sections of society accepted as perfect. Juan Domingo Perón won the elections and assumed the presidency on June 4, 1946. Perón would later be overthrown by the military in 1955, before he finished his second term.

== Coup of 16–23 September 1955 ==
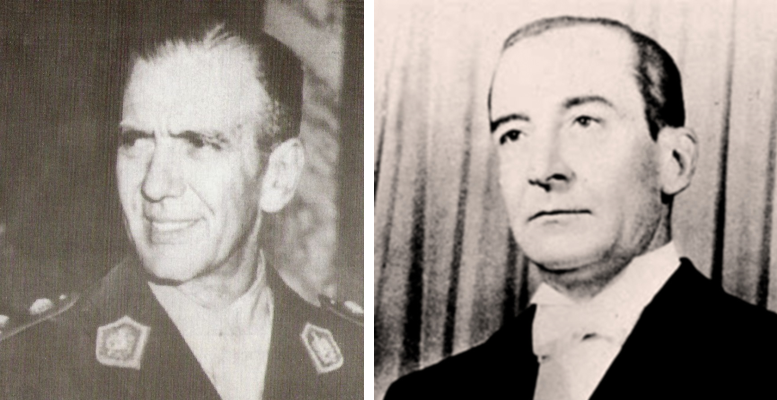
Generals Eduardo Lonardi and Pedro Eugenio Aramburu, the successive dictators of the Revolución Libertadora.

The so-called Revolución Libertadora was a transitional military dictatorship, brought about by an uprising which overthrew the president Juan Domingo Perón and lasted between 16 and 23 September 1955. On 23 September the leader of the insurrection, Eduardo Lonardi, was sworn in as president and congress was dissolved. On the following day, he designated Admiral Isaac Rojas as vice president.

During the Revolución Libertadora, the military government created a Civilian Advisory Board composed in large part of the political parties of the Radical Civic Union, the Socialist Party, the National Democratic Party, the Christian Democratic Party, and the Democratic Progressive Party.

The group behind the coup was divided in two parts: a Catholic-nationalist part led by General Eduardo Lonardi, who took charge of the government initially, and a liberal-conservative part led by General Pedro Eugenio Aramburu and Admiral Isaac Rojas. The latter group ended up gaining power and executing another coup, replacing Lonardi with Aramburu as president.

The dictatorship in power imposed a ban on Peron's Justicialist Party and began the persecution of its sympathizers, policies that would be maintained by successive governments over the following 18 years. The government also took over the unions. In actions that were unprecedented in the modern history of Argentina, it executed its opponents by firing squad, sometimes in public and sometimes clandestinely.

The government appointed civilians to run the Ministry of Economy, which was run successively by Eugenio Folcini, Eugenio A. Blanco, Roberto Verrier and Adalberto Krieger Vasena, who pursued policies favorable to the most well-off and economically powerful sectors of society.

One of the most significant institutional measures taken by the military dictatorship was to send out a proclamation abolishing ipso facto, the then national constitution, known as the Constitution of 1949, and replacing it with the text from Argentina's Constitution of 1853. This measure would later be endorsed by the Constitutional Convention which was elected in 1957 without following the constitucional procedure and prohibiting the participation of the Justicialist Party. After convening under the leadership and influence of the military regime, "article 14bis" was added to the constitution.

In 1958, the government of the Revolución Libertadora held a limited form of elections, overseen by the Armed Forces, in which the Peronist party was banned. The elections were won by the Intransigent Radical Civic Union (UCRI), a group from the fractured Radical Civic Union, led by Arturo Frondizi, who had established a pact with Perón in order to attract the decisive Peronist vote. President Frondizi was, in turn, overthrown by the military four years later.

== Coup of 29 March 1962 ==
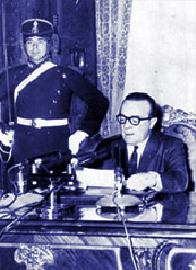
José María Guido, the only civilian dictator in the series of Argentinian coups d'état.

The military coup of March 29, 1962 was unique in that, after overthrowing Arturo Frondizi (of the Intransigent Radical Civic Union - UCRI), it was not a member of the military who took power, but rather a politician from the UCR, José María Guido, until then Provisional President of the Senate.

Frondizi endured repeated protests and military insurrections during his rule, during which even the Minister of the Economy (Álvaro Alsogaray) opposed him. These events ended in the coup of March 29, 1962, led by General Raúl Poggi.

The event that led to the coup was the sweeping victory of Peronism in the elections held eleven days before and in which ten of the fourteen then-existent provinces, including the strategic Province of Buenos Aires where the textile union leader Andrés Framini won. Peronism had been banned by the government of the Revolución Libertadora but Frondizi had allowed it in the elections, although he continued to prohibit Juan Perón from returning to the country and from running as a candidate. Frondizi immediately moved to establish his power in the provinces in which Peronist parties had won, but the coup proved to be unstoppable.

After the military uprising of March 29, 1962, President Frondizi, who had been arrested by the military and was being held at Isla Martín García, refused to resign saying "I will not commit suicide, I will not resign and I will not leave the country". This led to turmoil, threats and negotiations which exhausted the leaders of the insurrection who went to bed that night before formally assuming power. On the morning of March 30, the leader of the insurrection General Raúl Poggi went to the Casa Rosada (where the office of the president is located) to take charge of the government and was surprised to find that there were journalists telling him that a civilian, José María Guido, had been sworn in president that morning in the palace of the Supreme Court. Guido was a senator from the UCRI who was temporarily presiding over the senate, due to the resignation of Vicepresident Alejandro Gómez. The night of the coup, some lawyers associated with the Supreme Court, one of whom was Horacio Oyhanarte, decided that the downfall of Frondizi had led to the case of a leaderless government and proposed to Guido that, since he was next in line of succession, he assume the presidency, which he did on the morning of March 30.

The military leaders of the coup, who were surprised, skeptical and angry, ended up reluctantly accepting the situation and called Guido to the Casa Rosada to inform him that he would be recognized as the president, provided that he promised committed in writing to execute certain policies stipulated by the Armed Forces, the first of which was to annul the elections won by the Peronist factions. Guido accepted the military impositions, signed an act affirming this support and only then was he allowed to be given the title "president", but with the obligation of bringing the National Congress to a close and taking control of the provinces.

Guido upheld the military orders he had been given, annulling the elections, shutting down the National Congress, reinstating the ban on Peronism, taking control of the provinces and designating a right-wing economic team which included such figures as Federico Pinedo and José Alfredo Martínez de Hoz.

In 1963, there were more elections called in which Peronist factions were banned and which were won by Arturo Illia of the Radical Civic Union of the People (UCRP). After Illia, most votes were cast for None of the Above which Peronists took advantage of as a form of protest. President Illia assumed power on October 12, 1963, and would later be overthrown by a military coup on June 28, 1966.

== Coup of 28 June 1966 ==
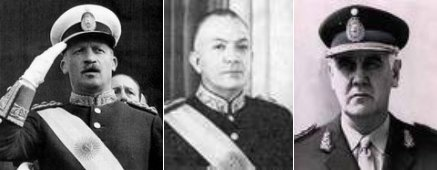
Generals Juan Carlos Onganía, Marcelo Levingston and Alejandro Lanusse, the three successive dictators of the self-styled "Argentine Revolution".

On June 28, 1966, a military uprising led by General Juan Carlos Onganía overthrew President Arturo Illia (of the Radical Civic Union of the People - UCRP). The coup gave rise to a dictatorship which called itself the "Argentine Revolution", which didn't claim to be a provisional government, as was the case with the previous coups, but rather established itself as a permanent government. At the time, there were many similar permanent military dictatorships coming to power in various Latin American countries (e.g. Brazil, Chile, Uruguay, Bolivia, Paraguay, etc.) and they were analyzed in detail by the political scientist Guillermo O'Donnell who gave them the name "bureaucratic-authoritarian state" (EBA).

The "Argentine Revolution" issued a statute in 1966 which held a superior judicial position to the constitution and, in 1972, introduced constitutional reforms. This was another action that distinguished this dictatorship from the previous ones. In general, the dictatorship adopted a fascist-Catholic-anticommunist ideology and was supported openly by the United States as well as by European countries.

The deep political and social conflict generated during the "Argentine Revolution" and the infighting between the many military divisions led to two internal coups, with three dictators succeeding each other in power: Juan Carlos Onganía (1966–1970), Marcelo Levingston (1970–1971) and Alejandro Agustín Lanusse (1971–1973).

On the economic front, the dictatorship handed over the Ministry of Economy to the most conservative-liberal sectors of the civilian population, which was epitomized by Adalberto Krieger Vasena, who had already served as minister under the "Revolución Libertadora". However, during the dictatorship of Levingston, a nationalist-developmentalist group of the Armed Forces became dominant and named Aldo Ferrer of the Intransigent Radical Civic Union as Minister of the Economy.

Threatened by a growing popular insurrection, the government organized an election to exit power in which Peronist parties were allowed (although Perón's candidacy was banned). The election took place in 1973 and the Peronist candidate Héctor José Cámpora won with 49.53% of the votes. He assumed power on May 25, 1973.

Cámpora then resigned in order to allow free elections to take place. Juan Perón won with 62% of the votes, but died less than a year after being elected. The Peronist government, which was subsequently led by vice president Isabel Perón, who succeeded her husband as president, was overthrown by a military coup in 1976.

== Coup of 24 March 1976 ==
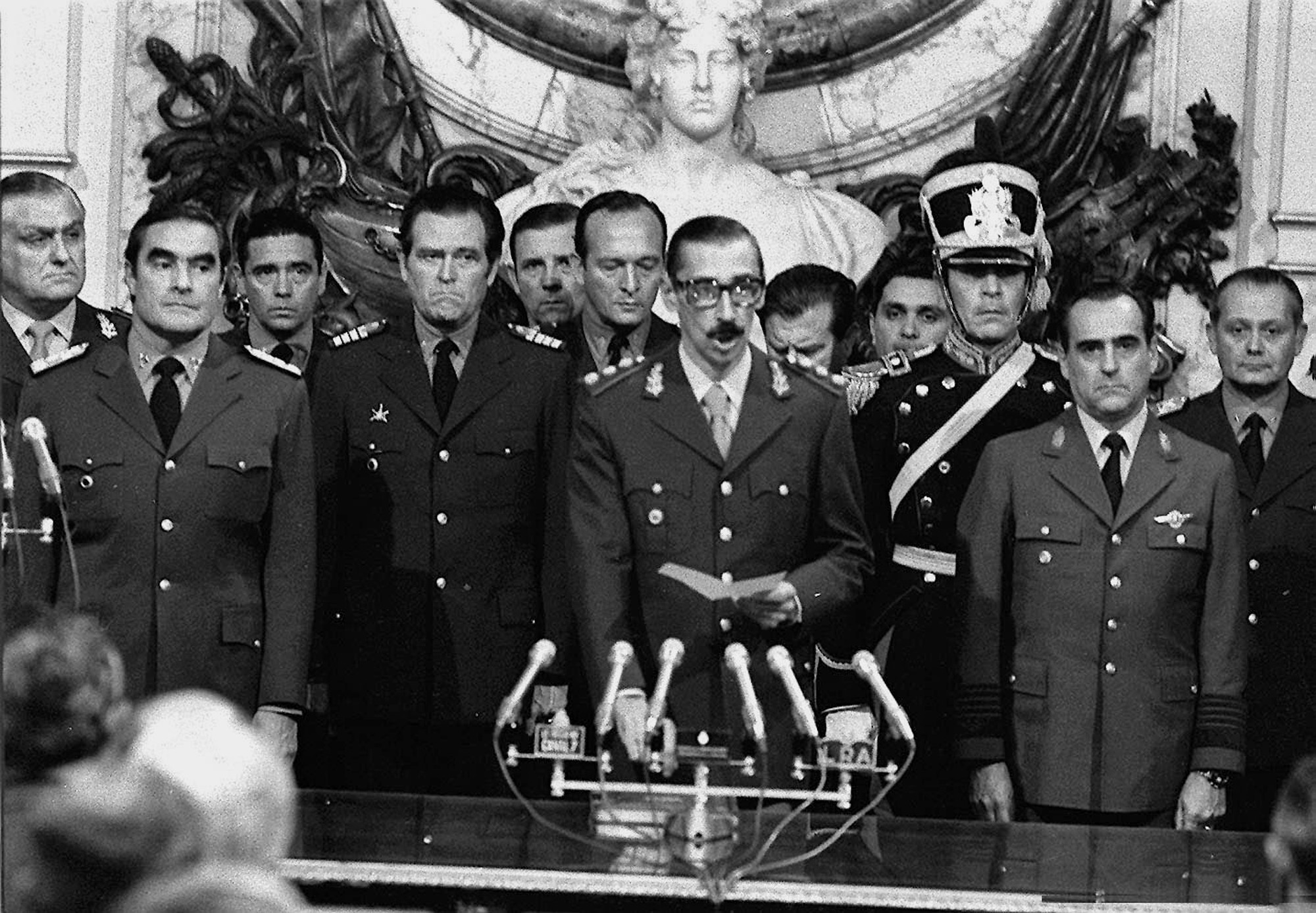
Jorge Rafael Videla swearing the Oath of office as the President of Argentina shortly after seizing power.

On March 24, 1976, a new military uprising overthrew president Isabel Perón and established a permanent dictatorship (a bureaucratic-authoritarian state), calling itself the "National Reorganization Process". The country was governed by a military junta made up of three members of the military, one for each faction. This junta appointed a functionary with the title "President" and with executive and legislative power.

Similarly to the previous dictatorship, the military junta passed a statute and two acts which were higher on the judicial hierarchy than the constitution.

The National Reorganization Process consisted of four successive military juntas:

- 1976–1980: Jorge Rafael Videla, Emilio Eduardo Massera and Orlando Ramón Agosti
- 1980–1981: Roberto Eduardo Viola, Armando Lambruschini and Omar Graffigna
- 1981–1982: Leopoldo Fortunato Galtieri, Jorge Isaac Anaya and Basilio Lami Dozo
- 1982–1983: Cristino Nicolaides, Rubén Franco and Augusto Jorge Hughes

During these periods, the juntas appointed the military members Jorge Rafael Videla, Roberto Eduardo Viola, Leopoldo Fortunato Galtieri, and Reynaldo Benito Bignone, respectively, as de facto presidents. Among these, Bignone was the only one not belonging to the junta.

The National Reorganization Process began the Dirty War, a type of state terrorism which massively violated human rights and led to the disappearance of tens of thousands of opponents.

Internationally, the Argentinian dictatorship, along with the human rights violations, had the active support of the government of the United States (except during the Jimmy Carter administration) and was tolerated by the European countries, the Soviet Union, and the Catholic Church, without whose inaction it would have been difficult for the dictatorship to sustain itself. Also, throughout the 1960s and early 1970s, military dictatorships were established in almost every country in South America (Brazil, Bolivia, Chile, Ecuador, Peru, and Uruguay). These countries, along with the US, jointly coordinated the repression via Operation Condor.

In economic matters, the dictatorship formally handed over the Ministry of the Economy to the most conservative business associations which promoted economic policies which were openly de-industrialist and neoliberal, and with a maximum expansion of the foreign debt.

In 1982, the military government entered into the Falklands War against the United Kingdom in an event of which the causes continue to be unclear. The defeat inflicted in this war sparked the fall of the third military junta and, a few months later, the fourth junta called elections for October 30, 1983. Raúl Alfonsín of the Radical Civic Union won the elections and assumed power on December 10, 1983.

The military leaders were tried and convicted, many of them being imprisoned after long and complex processes.

The "National Reorganization Process" was the last dictatorship. Even though there were various military insurrections between 1987 and 1990, called the "Carapintadas", none of them succeeded in toppling the democratic government.

== Coup of 11 December 1981 ==
On November 21, 1981, the military junta declared Roberto Eduardo Viola incapable of exercising his functions as president of Argentina due to "health problems." Viola was known to be a chain smoker, and among the "health reasons" that the junta used to force him to take medical leave was an alleged "coronary insufficiency and hypertension." In his place, the Minister of the Interior Horacio Tomás Liendo was appointed to the executive branch. Viola's intention was to resume office on the 23rd.

Although Viola had not interrupted the repressive actions or the operations against subversion at any time, on Thursday, December 10, the military junta issued an ultimatum to Viola, urging him to resign, with the decision taken to remove him from the presidency. The next day, the junta met with the dictator. Viola insisted on not resigning, so the junta informed him that he was being relieved - Viola did not resign. On the same day, the junta announced the imminent assumption of the presidency by General Leopoldo Fortunato Galtieri. Vice Admiral Carlos Alberto Lacoste temporarily replaced General Viola, until December 22, 1981, when Galtieri took office as president of Argentina, becoming the new dictator of his country.

== Considerations ==
The coups d'état in Argentina generated a series of specific political-judicial problems:

- The "de facto government doctrine" of the Supreme Court;
- The validity and fate of the so-called "decree laws" and other regulations passed by the military governments, once the dictatorships had ended;
- The punishment of those involved in the coups.

It is also possible to see an escalation in the repressive violence and a decline in respect for legal norms in each of the coups. In particular, whereas the first four coups d'état (1930, 1943, 1955, 1962) were defined as "provisional governments" and acted with the intention of calling democratic elections within a short time period, the two last coups (1966 and 1976) brought to power military dictatorships which were permanent and adhered to the idea of the bureaucratic-authoritarian state, described by Guillermo O'Donnell.

The economic teams formed by the military government tended to be made of the same figures, mainly coming from the conservative-liberal sections of society, leading some to say that the Armed Forces behaved as a political party of the upper classes. The coups that took place in Argentina, especially those starting from the 1960s, were part of a widespread trend in the Latin America in which there were many military coups, most of which were supported or promoted by the United States through the operations of the School of the Americas, located in Panama and through the US doctrine of National Security.

During the 1994 amendment of the Argentine Constitution, the doctrine of de facto governments and methods of preventing them from establishing themselves in future coups d'état were discussed at length. The result was the adoption of the first paragraph of article 36 of the National Constitution, also known as the "defense of democracy and defense of constitutional order":

This Constitution shall maintain its rule, even when its observance is interrupted by acts of force against the institutional order and democratic system. These acts will be irreparably null.

== See also ==
- History of Argentina
- List of coups and coup attempts by country
