= List of chiefs of the general staff of the Argentine Army =

Chief of the General Staff of the Argentine Army
- Jefe del Estado Mayor General del Ejército
- Seal of the Argentine Army

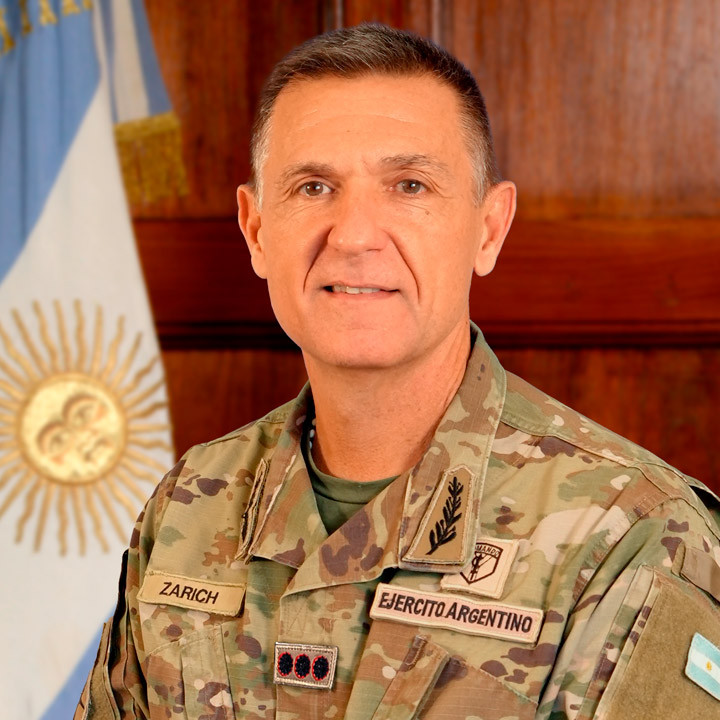
- Incumbent; Lieutenant General Oscar Zarich since 12 December 2025
- Argentine Army
- Reports to: Chief of the Joint Chiefs of Staff
- Appointer: President of Argentina

This article lists the chiefs of the General Staff of the Argentine Army and their preceding offices, between 1962 and the present day. The Argentine Army (Spanish: Ejército Argentino) is the land force of Argentina.

The current Chief of the Army General Staff is Lieutenant General Oscar Zarich. He was appointed by President Javier Milei on 12 December 2025.

== List ==
No.	Portrait	Name	Title	Took office	Left office	Time in office
1	Juan Carlos Onganía	Lieutenant General; Juan Carlos Onganía (1914–1995)	Commander-in-Chief of the Army	22 September 1962	25 November 1965	3 years, 64 days
2	Pascual Pistarini	Lieutenant General; Pascual Pistarini (1915–1999)	Commander-in-Chief of the Army	25 November 1965	28 June 1966	215 days
3	Julio Alsogaray	Lieutenant General; Julio Alsogaray (1918–1994)	Commander-in-Chief of the Army	28 June 1966	26 August 1968	2 years, 59 days
4	Alejandro Agustín Lanusse	Lieutenant General; Alejandro Agustín Lanusse (1918–1996)	Commander-in-Chief of the Army	26 August 1968	25 May 1973	4 years, 272 days
5	Jorge Carcagno	Lieutenant General; Jorge Carcagno (1922–1983)	Commander-in-Chief of the Army	25 May 1973	19 December 1973	208 days
6	Leandro Anaya [es]	Lieutenant General; Leandro Anaya (1922–2009)	General Commander of the Army	19 December 1973	13 May 1975	1 year, 145 days
7	Alberto Numa Laplane [es]	Lieutenant General; Alberto Numa Laplane (1924–1988)	General Commander of the Army	13 May 1975	27 August 1975	106 days
8	Jorge Rafael Videla	Lieutenant General; Jorge Rafael Videla (1925–2013)	General Commander of the Army	27 August 1975	31 July 1978	2 years, 338 days
9	Roberto Eduardo Viola	Lieutenant General; Roberto Eduardo Viola (1924–1994)	Commander-in-Chief of the Army	31 July 1978	29 March 1981	2 years, 241 days
10	Leopoldo Galtieri	Lieutenant General; Leopoldo Galtieri (1926–2003)	Commander-in-Chief of the Army	29 March 1981	18 June 1982	1 year, 81 days
11	Cristino Nicolaides	Lieutenant General; Cristino Nicolaides (1925–2011)	Commander-in-Chief of the Army	18 June 1982	10 December 1983	1 year, 175 days
12	Jorge Arguindegui [es]	Division General; Jorge Arguindegui (1930–1997)	Chief of the General Staff of the Army	10 December 1983	4 July 1984	207 days
13	Ricardo Pianta [es]	Division General; Ricardo Pianta (1927–2014)	Chief of the General Staff of the Army	4 July 1984	24 March 1985	263 days
14	Héctor Ríos Ereñú	Lieutenant General; Héctor Ríos Ereñú (1930–2017)	Chief of the General Staff of the Army	24 March 1985	2 December 1987	2 years, 253 days
15	José Caridi [es]	Lieutenant General; José Caridi (1930–2012)	Chief of the General Staff of the Army	2 December 1987	21 December 1988	1 year, 19 days
16	Francisco Gassino [es]	Lieutenant General; Francisco Gassino (1931–2017)	Chief of the General Staff of the Army	21 December 1988	8 July 1989	199 days
17	Isidro Cáceres [es]	Lieutenant General; Isidro Cáceres (1934–1990)	Chief of the General Staff of the Army	12 July 1989	21 March 1990 †	252 days
18	Martín Bonnet [es]	Lieutenant General; Martín Bonnet (1934–2020)	Chief of the General Staff of the Army	26 March 1990	31 October 1991	1 year, 219 days
19	Martín Balza	Lieutenant General; Martín Balza (born 1933)	Chief of the General Staff of the Army	4 November 1991	10 December 1999	8 years, 36 days
20	Ricardo Brinzoni	Lieutenant General; Ricardo Brinzoni (1945–2005)	Chief of the General Staff of the Army	10 December 1999	28 May 2003	3 years, 169 days
21	Roberto Bendini	Lieutenant General; Roberto Bendini (1945–2022)	Chief of the General Staff of the Army	28 May 2003	19 September 2008	5 years, 114 days
22	Luis Alberto Pozzi [es]	Lieutenant General; Luis Alberto Pozzi (born 1948)	Chief of the General Staff of the Army	19 September 2008	28 June 2013	4 years, 282 days
23	César Milani	Lieutenant General; César Milani (born 1954)	Chief of the General Staff of the Army	3 July 2013	24 June 2015	1 year, 356 days
24	Ricardo Cundom [es]	Lieutenant General; Ricardo Cundom (born 1955)	Chief of the General Staff of the Army	24 June 2015	25 January 2016	215 days
25	Diego Suñer [es]	Lieutenant General; Diego Suñer (born 1955)	Chief of the General Staff of the Army	25 January 2016	15 February 2018	2 years, 21 days
26	Claudio Pasqualini [es]	Lieutenant General; Claudio Pasqualini (born 1960)	Chief of the General Staff of the Army	15 February 2018	28 February 2020	2 years, 13 days
27	Agustín Humberto Cejas	Lieutenant General; Agustín Humberto Cejas (born 1964)	Chief of the General Staff of the Army	28 February 2020	15 December 2021	1 year, 290 days
28	Guillermo Pereda [es]	Lieutenant General; Guillermo Pereda (born 1964)	Chief of the General Staff of the Army	15 December 2021	2 January 2024	2 years, 18 days
29	Carlos Presti	Lieutenant General; Carlos Presti (born 1966)	Chief of the General Staff of the Army	2 January 2024	12 December 2025	1 year, 344 days
30	Oscar Zarich [es]	Lieutenant General; Oscar Zarich (born 1966)	Chief of the General Staff of the Army	12 December 2025	Incumbent	327 days

== See also ==
- Argentine Armed Forces
- Chief of the Joint Chiefs of Staff (Argentina)
- Chief of the General Staff of the Argentine Navy
- Chief of the General Staff of the Argentine Air Force
