= Barrio San Pedro Pescador =

Coordinates: 27°27′40″S 58°52′04″W

- Municipality and village
- Interactive map of Barrio San Pedro Pescador
- Country: Argentina
- Province: Chaco Province
- Department: Primero de Mayo
- Municipality: Colonia Benítez
- Elevation: 171 ft (52 m)

Population (2001)
  - Total: 646
  - Density: 170/sq mi (66/km^{2})
- Time zone: UTC−3 (ART)
- Area code: 0362

Barrio San Pedro Pescador is a village and municipality in Chaco Province in northern Argentina, located on the thin coastal levee of the Paraná River. The town is located in the Primero de Mayo Department and reports administratively to the Colonia Benitez municipality. It occupies the left side of the Chaco end of the General Manuel Belgrano Bridge, which links the province of Chaco with the city of Corrientes. The low-lying and floodable characteristics of the right bank of the Parana River are not conducive for human settlement, San Pedro Pescador being Chaco's only urban settlement located on the main channel of this river. Paradoxically the Parana River is the main source of livelihood (fishing) and its main threat, because of the periodic floods that force temporary abandonment by its inhabitants.

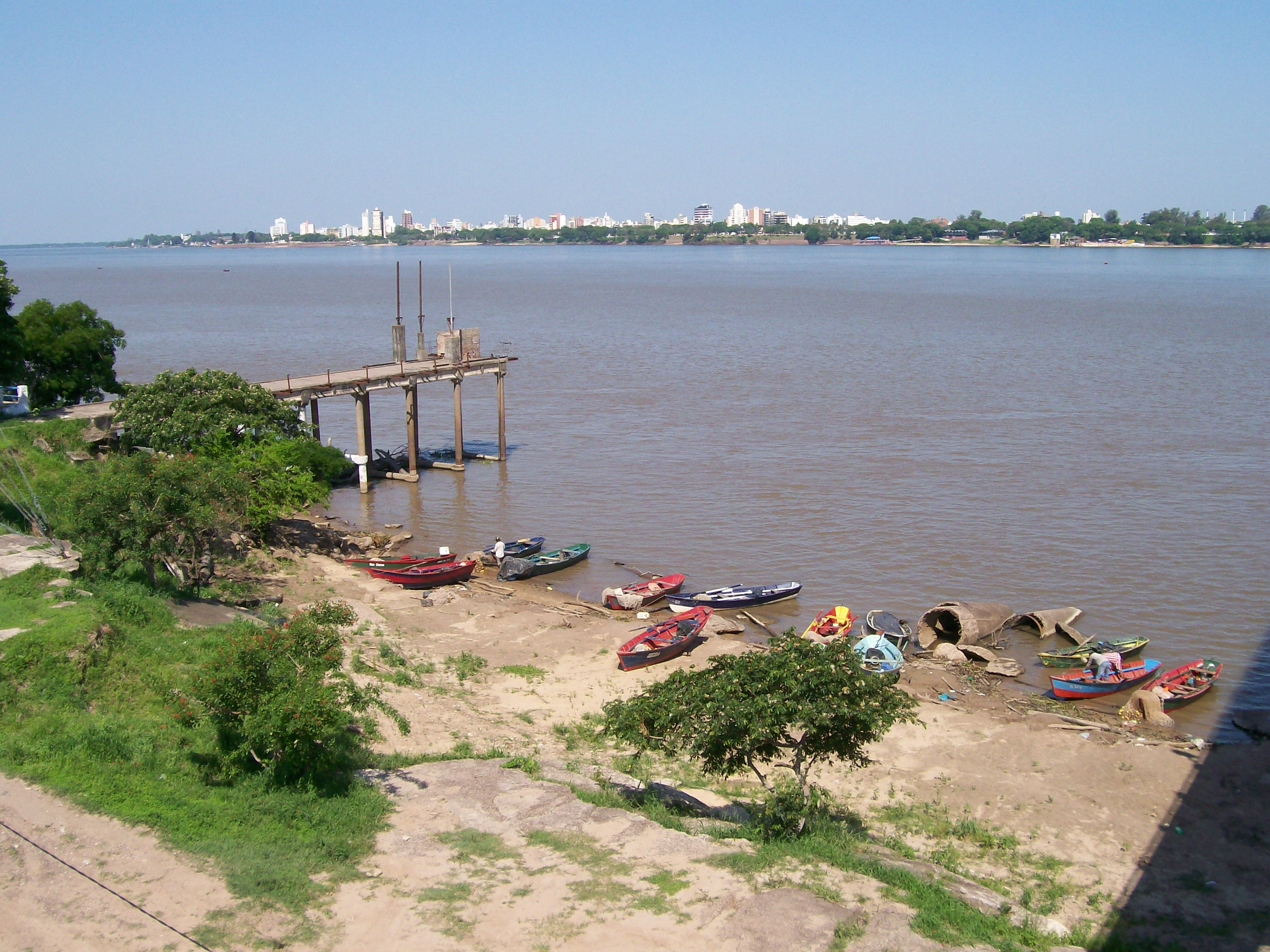
Boats on the Paraná river, main source of income in Barrio San Pedro Pescador.

Its inhabitants maintain educational, work or business links with both Gran Resistencia as well as Gran Corrientes. It was declared a Patrimonio Histórico, Cultural y Natural (Historical, Cultural and Natural Heritage) because of its riverfront location, traditional fishing as the main breadwinner of its inhabitants and for being the head of the construction of the interprovincial bridge.

== Population ==
Barrio San Pedro Pescador had 646 inhabitants (INDEC, 2001), representing an increase of 54.5% compared with the 418 inhabitants (INDEC, 1991) of the previous census.

== Toponym ==
The name Barrio San Pedro Pescador is a clear reference to Simon Peter, an apostle of Jesus of Nazareth and a professional fisherman. The identification of the site with fishing is such that it is popularly known as Barrio de los Pescadores (Fishermen's District).

== History ==
The settlement emerged in response to the Paraná River flood of 1982, when inhabitants of the banks and islands settled in the old General Manuel Belgrano Bridge workshop after losing their homes. After the dissipation of the flood waters many stayed in the area, taking advantage of the altitude. The then de facto governor, José David Ruiz Palacios, built 35 small houses and a health center that still exists to date. The inhabitants were and continue to be fishermen who made their living from the Paraná River and sold them in the growing local markets of Resistencia and Corrientes. Over the years the town has grown in population, completely occupying the few hectares of highlands available.

In 2010, a fierce debate for a provincial government project to install a riverfront casino resulted in its cancellation following opposition from a section of the population. The same sector prompted the declaration of the district as Patrimonio Histórico, Cultural y Natural (Historical, Cultural and Natural Heritage) in 2011.

== Geography ==
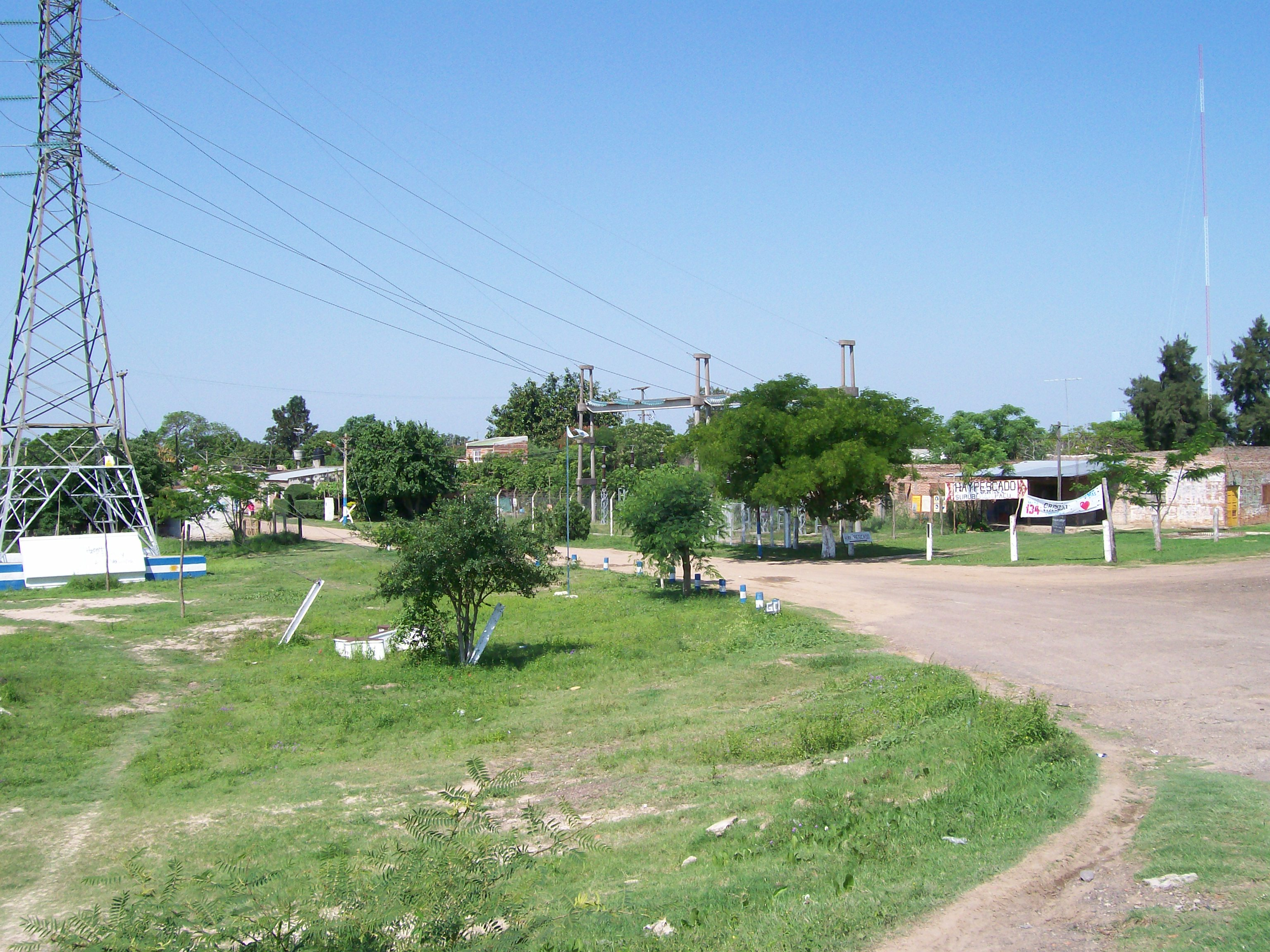
Main access to the district from the General Manuel Belgrano Bridge.

The coastal levee is the result of the accumulation of sediments of the Parana River on the shore; it is low rise, not higher than the 3 meter canyon, and is bounded on the east by the river and on the west by residual lagoons from former water channels. Its width does not exceed 250 meters, while the built portion covers about 600 meters long. Some fields are cultivated in the low semi-permanent floodplains.

The neighborhood is in a wedge in the Primero de Mayo Department above the San Fernando Department, and is administratively attached to the municipality of Colonia Benitez. The nearest populations are Corrientes at 1,700 meters, Barranqueras at 6 kilometers, and Resistencia at 9 kilometers, while Colonia Benitez is about 17 kilometers away.

== Infrastructure ==
Barrio San Pedro Pescador has a primary school, and since 2008 a high school has been operating at the same venue. Students attend from the neighbourhood and surrounding areas. The neighbourhood also has a level 2 health center.

== Economy ==
The dependence on Colonia Benitez is purely administrative, since the excellent communications and the size of the economies of Gran Resistencia and Gran Corrientes permit a functional dependency. Barrio San Pedro Pescador is not attached to any of these agglomerates as a result of insurmountable natural barriers, namely the Paraná river with Corrientes and a series of depressions and ponds with Gran Resistencia. Barrio San Pedro Pescador is an example of the growing cultural and economic integration between the two metropolitan areas.

== Communication routes ==
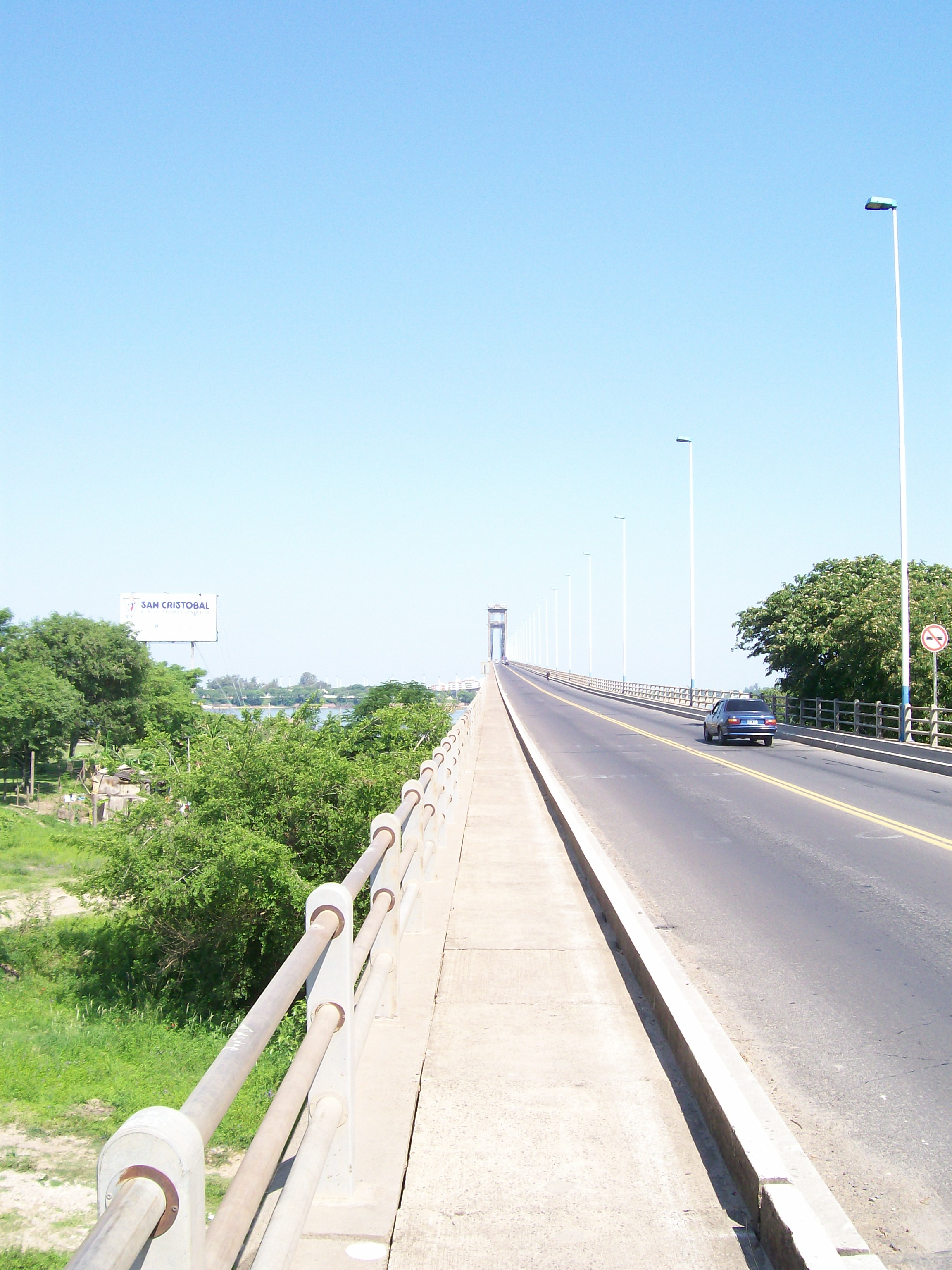
The General Manuel Belgrano Bridge seen from Barrio San Pedro Pescador.

The main access route is via National Route No. 16, which connects it to the west with the cities of Barranqueras and Resistencia, and to the east with the city of Corrientes across the General Manuel Belgrano Bridge, the first Argentine bridge over the Paraná River. It may also be considered as an access to Provincial Route 63, located 3 miles to the west and 3 kilometers to the north, reaching it by the aforementioned Route 16 or by a road that runs along the Parana River up to the Antequera jetty. Route 63 takes it north to the Isla del Cerrito and south to Barranqueras and Puerto Vilelas.

With respect to inland waterways, it has a small dock on the river Paraná and a beach of no more than 50 meters wide from which the fishermen prepare their journey.
