= Ricardo Brinzoni =

Argentine general

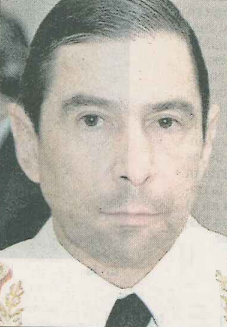
Ricardo Brinzoni

Ricardo Brinzoni (October 6, 1945 – October 24, 2005) was an Argentine military officer, serving as Argentina's Chief-of-staff.

Born in Buenos Aires, Brinzoni entered Military School on 1963, and trained as a paratrooper, qualifying in December 1964. He built a career in the military and reached the rank of brigadier general in 1990. In the 1990s he served as military attaché in Uruguay. On December 13, 1999, President Fernando de la Rúa appointed Brinzoni as Army Chief-of-staff and a lieutenant general.

During the military government of 1976–1983, Brinzoni was secretary-general of the military government of Chaco Province. After the return to democracy, he was accused of involvement in the Massacre of Margarita Belén, in which 22 political prisoners were executed on December 13, 1976.

While in command of the Army, he suggested bringing together human rights groups, the Catholic Church and the Army to form a "reconciliation panel" in order to find out the whereabouts of the "desaparecidos". Nevertheless, he was heavily criticised for defending the repression and military illegal actions of the military government, for allegedly protecting the officers involved, and for setting back the reconciliation process that had been started by his predecessor, Martín Balza. Brinzoni courted further controversy when it was revealed that his lawyer during this period, Juan Enrique Torres Bande, was a member of the neo-Nazi New Triumph Party.

Following Néstor Kirchner's inauguration as President in 2003, Brinzoni was retired and replaced by Roberto Bendini. Brinzoni subsequently issued several public statements criticising Kirchner's government.

Brinzoni was married to the former Lidia María Rosa Odino; they had three children and two grandchildren. He died of pancreatic cancer in Buenos Aires in 2005, aged 60.
