= Cristino Nicolaides =

Argentinian military officer, politician and criminal (1925–2011)

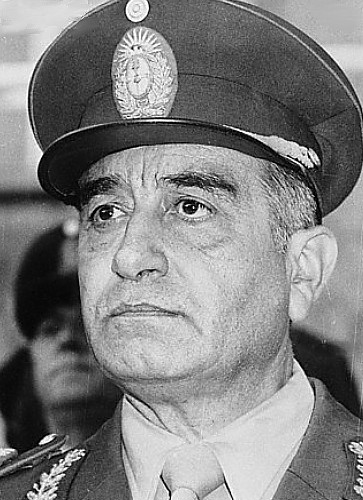
- Cristino Nicolaides in the early 1980s.
- Born: 2 January 1925; Córdoba, Argentina
- Died: 22 January 2011 (aged 86); Córdoba, Argentina
- Cause of death: Pneumonia
- Military career
- Allegiance: Argentina
- branch: Argentine Army
- Service years: 1944–2011
- Rank: Lieutenant general
- Commands: Commander-in-chief of the Argentine Army; Member of the Argentine Military Junta (along with Rubén Oscar Franco and Augusto Jorge Hughes)
- Known for: Repression
- Awards: Gran Oficial de la Orden El Sol del Perú

Signature
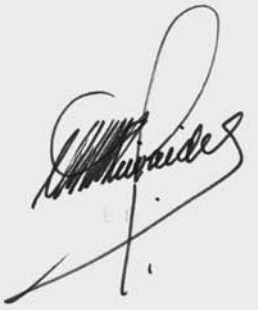

Cristino Nicolaides (2 January 1925 – 22 January 2011) was an Argentine military officer. He was a member of the National Reorganization Process, the military junta which ruled from 1976 to 1983, from 1982, after Argentina's defeat in the Falklands War, to 1983, when democracy was restored. In 2007, he was sentenced to 25 years in prison for crimes committed during the Dirty War. Until he died, he was under house arrest, accused in various criminal cases. Even then, the sentence was not final, so he kept his military status and pension.

== Biography ==
Cristino Nicolaides belonged to Graduating Class 76 from the Colegio Militar de la Nación, and left the college as an engineer gun sub-lieutenant in 1947. Later, when he had risen to captain, he served on the Army General Staff. In 1970, he received a promotion to colonel, along with being named director of the Combat Service School (Spanish: Escuela de Servicio de Combate).

Until 1975, at which time he still bore the rank of colonel, Nicolaides was commander of the VII Infantry Brigade; the same year, while already in María Estela Martínez de Perón's government, he was promoted to brigade general and was head of the Batallón de Inteligencia 601. Later, as a divisional general, he was Commander of Military Institutes (Comandante de Institutos Militares) between December 1979 and December 1980.

In December 1980, Nicolaides replaced Antonio Domingo Bussi as commander of the III Army Corps. He was in this military post until December 1981, when he yielded the position to Eugenio Guañabens Perelló.

In December 1981, Nicolaides took over command of the I Army Corps, once again from Antonio Domingo Bussi. This post he held until 18 June 1982, when he replaced Leopoldo Fortunato Galtieri as Commander-in-chief of the Army, after Argentina's defeat in the Falklands War. Command over the I Army Corps was assumed by Juan Carlos Ricardo Trimarco.

As the army's representative, Nicolaides was a member of the fourth military junta, along with Admiral Rubén Oscar Franco (representing the navy) and Brigade General Augusto Jorge Hughes (representing the air force), which ran the country from 10 September 1982 until 5 December 1983, with Reynaldo Bignone designated as the de facto president.

On 30 November 1983. one week before leaving power and being demoted, Cristino Nicolaides signed the decree condemning Colonel Juan Jaime Cesio (57) for denouncing the disappearances.

Gangs made up of military officers have usurped the Government, and – with the mendacious purpose of fighting "subversion" – they committed aberrant crimes, such as kidnapping, torture and murder of thousands of persons.

— Juan Jaime Cesio (Note: On 23 March 2006, President Néstor Kirchner not only restored Cesio's military rank but also promoted him to general.)

On 16 December 1983, Nicolaides was sent into retirement by the new constitutional (that is, not simply de facto) president, Raúl Alfonsín. Taking up his former post was Brigade General Jorge Arguindegui, who would later be promoted to divisional general.

=== Verdicts against Nicolaides ===
In 1983, President Raúl Alfonsín, in the decree that ordered the trials, excluded – for unknown reasons – the members of the last Argentinian military junta. Nicolaides and his two fellow junta members were thus not tried in the historic Trial of the Juntas. Nevertheless, the last junta's members, and their last president, too, were indicted in connection with signing the so-called Final Document on the Fight against Subversion and Terrorism (Spanish: Documento Final sobre la Lucha contra la Subversión y el Terrorismo), and with sanctioning a "self-amnesty law" (Spanish: ley de autoamnistía) in 1983, under which they sought to grant themselves amnesty from prosecution before the new democratic government had a chance to try them for any wrongdoing. The law might well have served to cover up the junta's practice of taking young children away from detained mothers during the Dirty War.

Subsequently, Nicolaides was newly indicted for other crimes. He lived out his last days under house arrest while facing charges in connection with taking babies away from detained mothers during the Dirty War, which were not covered by the Full stop law or the Law of Due Obedience, as well as further charges brought after earlier ones were dropped.

On 17 December 2007, he was found guilty of illicit association, unlawful deprivation of freedom, unlawful confinement and reduction to servitude committed against six members of the organization Montoneros, who are still missing, and among whom is Ricardo Marcos Zucker. For this, he was sentenced to 25 years in prison. In this trial, Nicolaides was, along with seven other former members of the armed and security forces, the first to be tried since the repeal of the Laws of Due Obedience and Full Stop.

Nicolaides was likewise accused of being responsible for the so-called Margarita Belén massacre and for the disappearances that took place at Regiment 9 in Corrientes while he held sway in the region, but he died on 22 January 2011 at the age of 86, before the sentence was handed down, and was thus not named in it.

== See also ==
- Military coups in Argentina
- List of sentences for crimes against humanity in Argentina (in Spanish)
