= Argentine Army Military Merit Medal =

The "Argentine Army Military Merit Medal" (Spanish: Medalla al Mérito Militar del Ejercito Argentino) is the fourth highest decoration awarded in the Argentine Army.

== History ==
The award was instituted on 6 May 1977 by Jorge Rafael Videla. In 1982 it was awarded during the Falklands War.

== Recipients ==
- Martín Antonio Balza
- Aldo Rico
- Horacio Losito
- Domingo Victor Alamo
- Marcelo Andres Florio

== Sources ==
- "Distinciones y Condecoraciones". infanteria.mil.ar. Archived from the original on December 10, 2013.
