= Agustín Humberto Cejas =

Argentine military person, chief of the Argentine Army

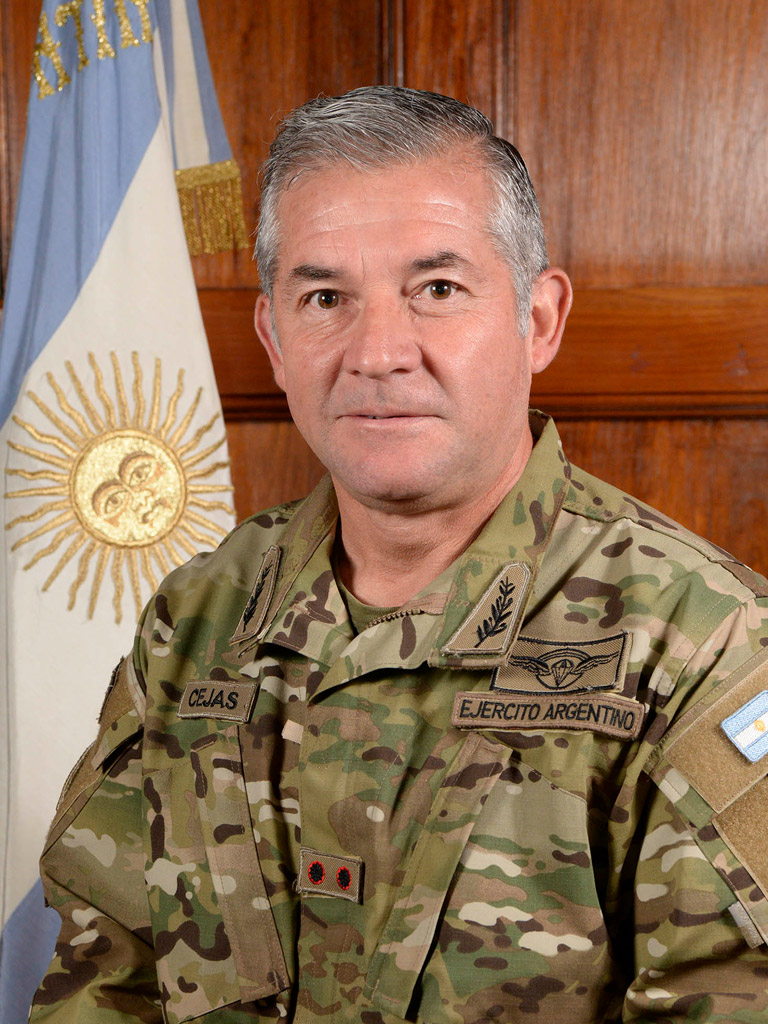

Chief of the Army General Staff
- In office 28 February 2020 – 15 December 2021
- Preceded by: Claudio Pasqualini
- Succeeded by: Guillermo Pereda

Personal details
- Born: 18 July 1964 (age 61) Córdoba Province, Argentina

Military service
- Allegiance: Argentina
- Branch/service: Argentine Army
- Years of service: 1984-2021
- Rank: Lieutenant General

Agustín Humberto Cejas (born 18 July 1964) is a retired Argentine General who served as the Chief of the Army General Staff.

== Military career ==
Agustín Cejas received his commission as a military officer at the Nation Military College in 1984.

Cejas has the following service record:

- 4th Paratrooper Artillery Group.
- 11th Artillery Group.
- Artillery School.
- Superior War School.
- Army General Staff.
- Chief of 10th Artillery Group.
- Director of Artillery School.
- Inspector of Artillery.
- Vice principal of Nation Military College.
- Principal of Nation Military College.
- Managing director of Education.
- Vice rector of National Defence University.

=== Chief of Army General Staff ===
President Alberto Fernández ordered the change of the chief of the Army General Staff. Then Brigadier General Agustín H. Cejas was invested as the new chief of the General Staff of the Army by Decree 181/2020.

On February 28, 2020, Minister of Defence Agustín Rossi commissioned Cejas in a ceremony held in the 1st Infantry Regiment “Patricios”. The outgoing holder, Lieutenant General Claudio Pasqualini, was also honored.

He was replaced by Guillermo Pereda as the new chief of the General Staff of the Army on December 15, 2021 by Decree 850/2021.
