= Luis Videla =

Luis Videla may refer to:

- Luis Videla (governor) (ca. 1790–1831), Argentine soldier and politician, brother of Blas Videla
- Luis Videla Salinas (1889–1994), Chilean educator and politician
