= General Vega =

General Vega may refer to:

- Camilo Alonso Vega (1889–1971), Spanish Army lieutenant general and honorary captain general
- Gerardo Clemente Vega (born 1940), Mexican Army general
- José Marina Vega (1850–1926), Spanish Army lieutenant general
- Nicolás Vega (fl. 1820s–1860s), Argentine civil war general
