= Margarita Belén massacre =

Coordinates: 27°19′58″S 59°0′6″W

The Margarita Belén Massacre (Spanish: Masacre de Margarita Belén) took place during the Dirty War in Argentina. It involved the torture and execution of 22 Montoneros, some of whom were killed after surrendering and laying down their weapons near the town of Margarita Belén, Chaco Province, on 13 December 1976, in a joint operation of the Argentine Army and the Chaco Provincial Police. One of the victims of the massacre, Néstor Carlos Salas, is reported to have been a Montoneros commander and took part in a number of guerrilla operations. Argentina was at the time ruled by the National Reorganization Process.

The massacre was one of many cases included in the Trial of the Juntas in 1985, two years after the end of the dictatorship. The Buenos Aires Federal Chamber found junta leader General Jorge Rafael Videla guilty of homicide. The Federal Chambers of Rosario and Paraná dictated the same sentence for General Cristino Nicolaides, junta leader General Leopoldo Galtieri and Santa Fe Provincial Police chief commissioner Wenceslao Ceniquel.

The late Ricardo Brinzoni, Secretary General of the Chaco military province during the dictatorship, and Chief of Staff of the Army from 1999 to 2003, has also been accused of responsibility for the massacre.

== The massacre ==
The prisoners were mostly from Montoneros organization. Some of them were legally detained at Penitentiary Unit n° 7 in Resistencia, Chaco, while others were brought from prisons in Misiones Province; on 12 December they were all taken to the Resistencia police headquarters, tortured, and locked up in individual cells. A military order to move the prisoners to another prison in Formosa was allegedly received during the night. The military took the prisoners away and drove them along National Route 11 in two vehicles, escorted by a police car. At some point near Margarita Belén, the prisoners were shot and placed in several vehicles. Prior to that, according to a member of the police, the female prisoners were raped and three of the male prisoners were castrated, along with further tortures. Ten bodies were taken to Resistencia's cemetery and buried in graves that had been prepared beforehand.

The official military version reported that the convoy had been attacked on the road, and that at least five of the prisoners had died in the shooting that followed, while the rest had fled. Zapata Soñez is reported to have been one of the Montoneros who managed to escape in the shootout, according to the military version of events. The prosecution claims that the military version of events is a cover-up, used to mask illegal executions, and maintain they were common during the Dirty War. It is believed that the massacre, which was ordered by then-Colonel Cristino Nicolaides, was in retaliation for the attack on the 29th Mountain Infantry Regiment in Formosa, carried out by Montoneros guerrillas on 5 October 1975 and which cost the lives of 14 servicemen. Defence lawyer Eduardo Sinforiano San Emeterio, maintains that eight of the prisoners: Nestor Carlos Salas, Reynaldo Zapata Sonez, Carlos Alberto Zamudio, Luis Alberto Díaz, Mario Cuevas, Patricio Blas Tierno and Manuel Parodi Ocampo had in fact been killed in their escape and in the shootout with guerrillas sent to rescue them.

== 1985 Trial of the Juntas ==
The massacre was one of many cases included in the Trial of the Juntas in 1985, two years after the end of the dictatorship. The Buenos Aires Federal Chamber sentenced that the official version of the story lacked verisimilitude and found junta leader Jorge Rafael Videla guilty of homicide. The Federal Chambers of Rosario and Paraná dictated the same sentence for Cristino Nicolaides, junta leader Leopoldo Galtieri and Santa Fe Provincial Police chief Wenceslao Ceniquel.

== See also ==
- Dirty War
- List of massacres in Argentina
