= Primero de Mayo Department =

- Department
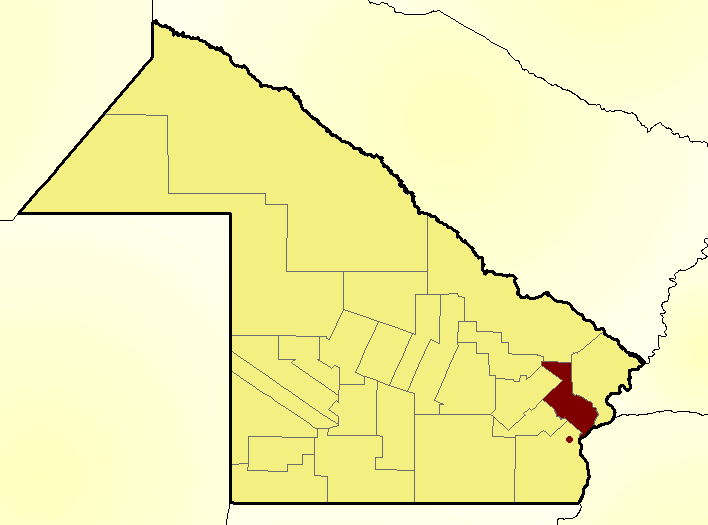
- Location of Primero de Mayo Department within Chaco Province
- Coordinates: 27°16′S 58°58′W
- Country: Argentina
- Province: Chaco Province
- Head town: Margarita Belén

Area
  - Total: 1,864 km^{2} (720 sq mi)

Population
  - Total: 9,131
  - Density: 4.899/km^{2} (12.69/sq mi)
- Time zone: UTC-3 (ART)
- Postal code: H3505
- Area code: 03722

Primero de Mayo is a south eastern department of Chaco Province in Argentina.

The provincial subdivision has a population of about 9,000 inhabitants in an area of 1,864 km^{2}, and its capital city is Margarita Belén, which is located around 1,035 km from the Capital federal.

== Settlements ==
- Colonia Benítez
- Margarita Belén
- Barrio San Pedro Pescador
