= Disposición Final =

2012 Argentine book by Ceferino Reato

- Author: Ceferino Reato
- Language: Spanish
- Subject: Jorge Rafael Videla
- Genre: Interview
- Publication place: Argentina

Disposición Final (English: Final disposal) is a 2012 Argentine non-fiction book by Ceferino Reato. It contains a long interview with Jorge Rafael Videla, de facto president of Argentina during the National Reorganization Process, and sentenced to life imprisonment for human rights violations. Videla detailed the reasons and procedures of the military government, and Reato provided the historical context.

== Creation ==
Ceferino Reato visited Campo de Mayo to interview a former military held prisoner at that place. He had a casual meeting with Jorge Rafael Videla, who was also held in Campo de Mayo. Reato asked him some questions, but Videla invited him to run a full interview. The interviews were complicated by the ban on entering the cells with electronic devices, such as recorders, so Reato had to take notes manually.

== Declarations ==
Videla justified the forced disappearances of the military dictatorship by rejecting the alternatives. He said that members of Montoneros and ERP could not be held in prison, as that was the policy followed by the Argentine Revolution military government, and all the prisoners were pardoned by Héctor José Cámpora and returned to their groups. He did not consider that public trials ending in a death penalty could be a feasible option either, citing the international repercussions of a similar trial by the Spanish government of Francisco Franco against ETA members.

== Reception ==
The journalist Horacio Verbitsky considered that Videla's admission was positive, and downplayed the difference between the number of forced disappearances given by Videla and the more common figure of 30,000 people disappeared during the State terrorism, saying "Perhaps he spoke of 7/8 thousand while there were 15, 20, or 30 thousand. The quantity isn't important. What is so important is the fact that he has confessed that the disappeared have been, in reality, murdered. He was, finally, obligated to tell the truth."
