= Margarita Belén =

- Town
- Location in Argentina
- Coordinates: 27°16′S 58°58′W
- Country: Argentina
- Province: (Chaco Province) Chaco
- Department: Primero de Mayo
- 3rd level Municipality: Margarita Belén
- Founded: 1890
- Elevation: 81 m (266 ft)

Population ((2001 census [INDEC]))
  - Total: 5,547
- Time zone: UTC−3 (ART)
- CPA Base: H 3505
- Area code: +54 3722
- Climate: Cfa

Margarita Belén is a town in Chaco Province, Argentina. It is the head town of the Primero de Mayo Department.

The town became infamous when on 13 December 1976, a joint operation of the Argentine Army and the Chaco Provincial Police resulted in the Massacre of Margarita Belén during the so-called National Reorganization Process. The operation resulted in the torture and execution of 22 political prisoners.
