= Nationalist Workers Party =

The Nationalist Workers Party may refer to one of several political groups:

- The Fascist Nationalist Workers Party of New Zealand (formerly New Force)
- The Nationalist Workers Party (MDP) of Turkey who polled 2.93% in the 1987 Turkish general election
- The original name of the New Triumph Party of Argentina, a minor far right Neo-Nazi group.
