= Roberto Bendini =

Argentine lieutenant general (1945–2022)

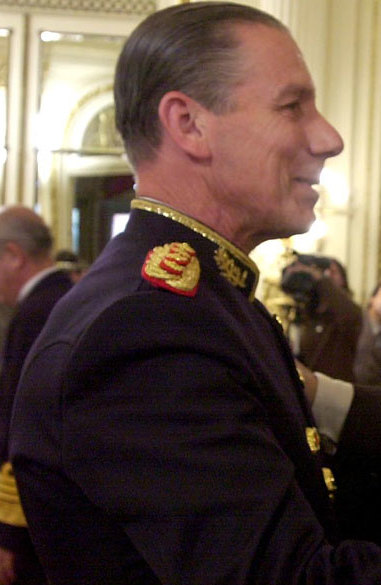
Bendini in 2004

Roberto Bendini (28 July 1945 – 14 April 2022) was an Argentine lieutenant general.

He was chief of the general staff of the Army from 28 May 2003 to 19 September 2008. Bendini was the general who took down the paintings of former de facto presidents Jorge Rafael Videla and Reynaldo Bignone on 24 March 2004. He died of pancreatic cancer on 14 April 2022 at the age of 76 in Del Viso, Argentina.
