= Blas Videla =

Argentine soldier and politician

Blas de Videla Páez (c. 1785–28 march 1831) was an Argentine soldier and Unitarian politician.

He was born into a wealthy family of merchants and landowners in San Luis Province. In 1803 he became a lieutenant in a volunteer regiment of the provincial cavalry. In 1806 he marched to Buenos Aires under the command of the viceroy Rafael de Sobremonte to fight against the British invasion. Though he arrived too late to join in the reconquest of the city, he aided in the defense of the city the following year.

In 1810 he participated in the provincial militia in support of the Revolution of May. He commanded a contingent of 225 San Luis soldiers, who joined with the Army of the North. He participated in the battles of Tucumán, Salta, and Vilcapugio. He was apparently wounded in the latter, because he did not figure in any of the later activities of the Army of the North, and returned to San Luis.

Later he joined the Army of the Andes, but took no part in the famous Chilean campaign, as he was committed to the defense of the border against the Ranquel. In 1819 he helped to put down a royalist mutiny among the officer corps.

For many years Videla remained posted to the border. He was involved in a notable incident in 1822 in which he repelled an invasion, and the following year he advanced into the "desert" of the interior in order to collect intelligence on the military capabilities of the Ranquel and Pehuenche people.

He took part in the Unitarian Revolution of 1829, and upon its failure he retreated to Córdoba Province under the protection of Colonel Juan Gualberto Echeverría. The following year, after participating in the Battle of Oncativo, he returned to his native province in order to support the governments of his brothers Ignacio and Luis. Early in 1831 he fought against Facundo Quiroga in the Battle of Río Quinto under the command of Colonel Juan Pascual Pringles. He withdrew his forces to Mendoza Province, where he joined up with the army of José Videla Castillo, who confronted Quiroga in the Battle of Rodeo de Chacón. After the battle Videla fled south and was taken prisoner. Other prisoners alleged that he had attempted to gain his freedom by betraying his comrades to the Federales. Whatever the truth of these accusations, he remained imprisoned.

A few weeks later, in the middle of March, Quiroga learned of the assassination of his friend José Benito Villafañe, who had been returning to Chile, and decided to exact vengeance: he ordered the execution of 26 officials, almost all of whom were prisoners taken at Río Quinto or Rodeo de Chacón. Among these was Blas Videla. He died in Mendoza.

Blas Videla is today best known as the great-great-grandfather of Jorge Rafael Videla, the dictator of Argentina between 1976 and 1981.

== Bibliography ==
- Núñez, Urbano J., Historia de San Luis, Ed, Plus Ultra, Bs. As., 1980.
