= José Benito Villafañe =

Argentine soldier

José Nazario Benavídez
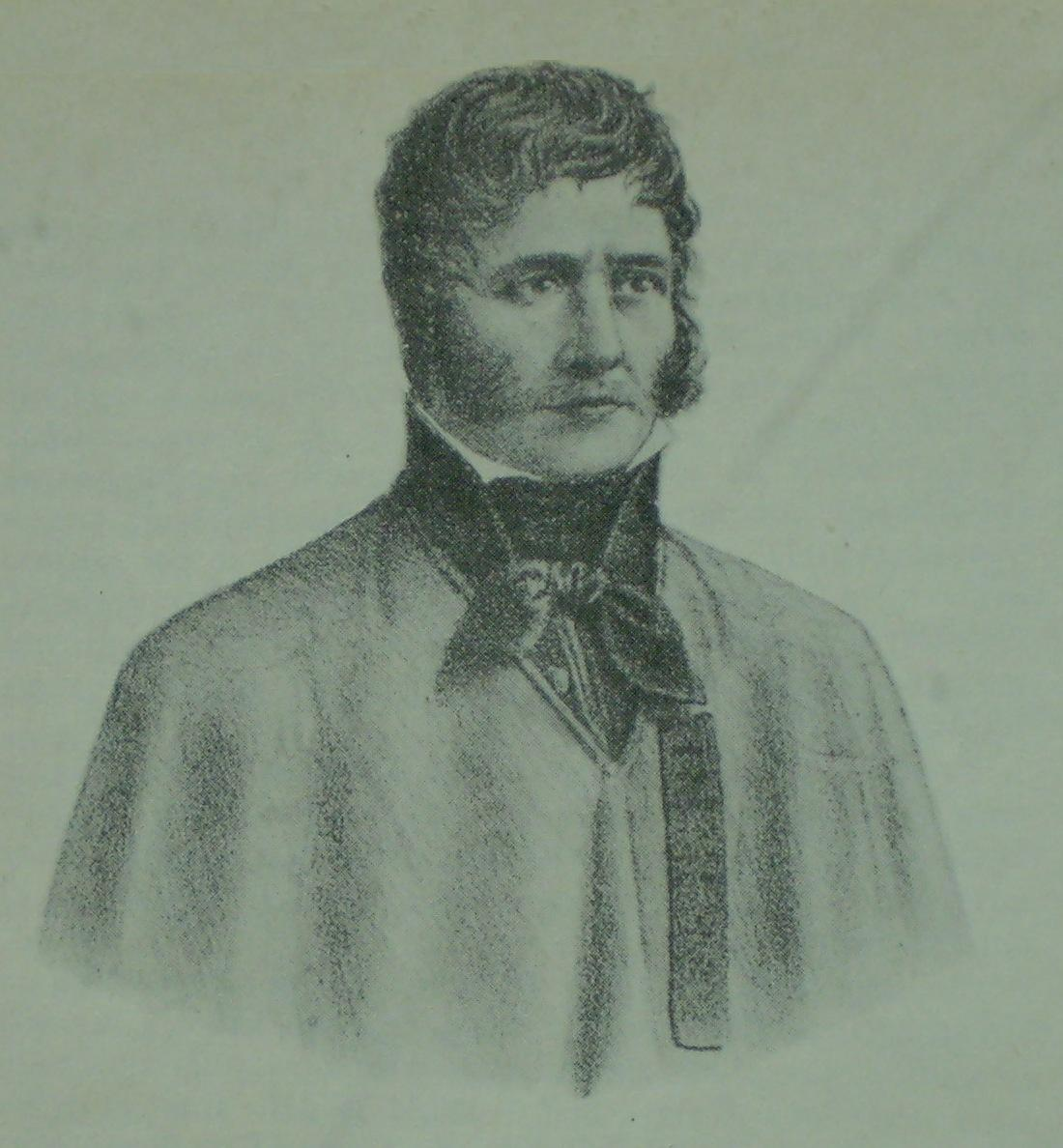

Governor of La Rioja Province, Argentina

Personal details
- Born: 9 July 1790 La Rioja, Argentina
- Died: May, 1831 San Juan Province, Argentina

José Benito Villafañe (9 July 1790 – May 1831) was an Argentine soldier who participated in the war of independence and was governor of La Rioja Province, Argentina, under the protection of the caudillo Facundo Quiroga.

== Early years ==
José Benito Villafañe was born in La Rioja, then in the Viceroyalty of the Río de la Plata on 9 July 1790. He was son of Nicholas Villafañe and Maria de la Concepcion del Moral, and the head of his branch of the powerful Villafañe family. He joined the provincial militia in the campaign for independence. In 1817 he participated in the campaign, under Colonel Francisco Zelada and the Riojan Nicholas Davila Nicolás Dávila that crossed into Chile and freed the Copiapó region. He fought in the Battle of Huasco.

== Leader in La Rioja ==
Villafañe supported the revolt that brought to power Francisco Ortiz de Ocampo in 1820, and gained autonomy for La Rioja. Ocampo promoted him to the rank of colonel. Ocampo's government was simply appalling. When the revolution broke out in September against the governor he fled and Villafañe took over the government. He called legislative elections, which elected Nicolás Dávila as governor. Among various disagreements, he managed to rule over two years.

In 1823 a crisis erupted between Dávila and Facundo Quiroga, the military commander of the province. Villafañe sided with Quiroga, on whose orders he fought in the Battle of El Puesto. Shortly after, he arranged the election that chose Quiroga as governor. For most of the year 1825 he was deputy governor of the province, and supported Quiroga's campaign against General Gregorio Aráoz de Lamadrid.

That same year, President Bernardino Rivadavia appointed him commander of all the forces of La Rioja, but he did not recognize the presidential authority of the Buenos Aires governor. He was later president of the Mint of La Rioja. He was the best friend and ally of Quiroga. In 1828, Governor Manuel Dorrego sent him to Montevideo with General Miguel de Azcuénaga to exchange documents relating to peace with the Empire of Brazil and the independence of Uruguay. He returned to La Rioja shortly before the Unitarian revolution in December of that year.

== Civil war against Unitarians ==
Villafañe was appointed second in command of the army of La Rioja, and was promoted to general by order of Quiroga. He fought against the invader José María Paz at the Battle of La Tablada as head of a cavalry division. From there Villafañe went to Cuyo, where Unitarian revolutions had broken out that took advantage of the absence of troops who had gone to fight in Córdoba Province. In San Juan he fought off the governor Manuel Quiroga del Carril, and from there went on Mendoza. He accompanied General José Félix Aldao in the campaign against the Unitarians Moyano and Alvarado, fighting in the Battle of Pilar. After this he tried unsuccessfully to stop the killings that Aldao launched in revenge for the killing of his brother while under a flag of truce.

Villafañe returned to La Rioja, and quickly went on to Catamarca Province, where he won at Ancasti against Colonel Lobo, who was killed in action, and defeated the government of Felipe Figueroa. Thus, with the crucial help of Villafañe, Quiroga recovered what had been lost in the aftermath of La Tablada. As soon as he knew that Catamaca was in Federalist hands, Facundo returned to Córdoba and joined Aldao. In the north of the province Villafañe advanced with 1,400 men, and at Totoral Chico defeated Lieutenant Colonel Rafael Torres.

In February 1830 Villafañe and Quiroga failed to join forces. As a result, Quiroga was defeated at the Battle of Oncativo by Unitarian general José María Paz, losing 200 men and his baggage train. Villafañe retired to La Rioja, and along the way signed the Treaty of Serrezuela with Paz, which forced Gaspar Villafañe, governor of La Rioja, to leave office and hold new elections. Villafañe signed the armistice on 5 March 1830. While some of his troops accepted the pact, others under Nazario Benavídez split away and marched to San Juan, where they joined an unsuccessful revolt against the Unitarian General Nicolás Vega. Under the pact, the General had to surrender all weapons to Lamadrid, who invaded the province of his hated enemy Quiroga. But in the new elections Benito Villafañe was elected governor.

Lamadrid ignored then the treaty, and also occupied La Rioja. Villafañe emigrated to Chile, settling in La Serena, while Lamadrid chose Domingo Eugenio Villafañe as governor, a distant relative, who passed a law declaring Generals Quiroga and Villafañe outlaws and deprived of the right to life. In early 1831 Quiroga defeated José Videla Castillo in Mendoza and called Villafañe to take command of his army. Quiroga was sick with rheumatism and directed the Battle of Rodeo de Chacon with a baton from the box of a cart. While returning from Chile, Villafañe encountered the Unitarian Navarro, whom he defeated.

Villafañe was assassinated in May 1831. Upon learning the news, Quiroga decided that until then he had been too lenient with his enemies, who had replied with death sentences, looting of property, torture of his mother, and now with the murder of his best friend. In revenge for Villafañe's death he shot 26 enemy officers.
