= Nicolás Vega =

Argentine soldier

Nicolás Vega was an Argentine soldier who fought as a General on the Unitarian side in the Argentine Civil Wars. He is known for his defeat at the Battle of Niquivil, although later he was Governor of San Juan Province.

== Origins ==
Nicolás Vega was a Spanish navy lieutenant from Esmeralda, Chile who joined the Unitarians. He married into the powerful Furque family and settled in San Juan. According to Domingo Faustino Sarmiento, who was one of Vega's aides-de-camp at Niquivil, he unfortunately lacked leadership qualities, which showed in his soft face.

== San Juan ==
In April 1829 General Facundo Quiroga arranged for José María de Echegaray to become acting governor of San Juan to raise troops to fight General José María Paz. Echegaray sent Quiroga a division commanded by Lieutenant Colonel Gregorio Manuel Quiroga. While not far from San Juan, on the night of 2/3 June 1829 some of his men revolted and headed for the town. The Unitarian rebels occupied San Juan the next day, and Echegaray and others fled to Mendoza Province. Juan Aguilar was elected governor and Lieutenant Colonel Nicolás Vega was made General and head of the San Juan division. Colonel José Félix Aldao and his brother Lt. Col. Francisco Aldao moved towards San Juan from Mendoza with all available forces on 14 June 1829. General Vega, who had decided to retire with the Unitarian division to Jáchal, was forced to give battle in Niquivil. He was defeated and Echegaray was restored to San Juan.

In 1830, Nicolás Vega was back in power as Governor of San Juan. The Federalist General José Benito Villafañe signed an armistice with the Unitarian general José María Paz on 5 March 1830. While some of Villafañe's troops accepted the pact, others under Nazario Benavídez split away and marched to San Juan, where Benavídez joined an unsuccessful revolt against Vega. Benavídez was taken prisoner on 18 May 1830, but escaped on 3 November 1830 along with other Federalist leaders during an uprising in the city and fled to Chile.

== Later years ==
Later, General Vega moved back to Chile where he operated the La Colorada mine at Copiapó, and was able to help Sarmiento with a job as foreman during his period of exile.

At the end of December 1868, General Nicolas Vega asked to be included among the "Guerreros de la Independencia".
