= Rubén Oscar Franco =

Argentinian military officer, politician and criminal (1927–2025)

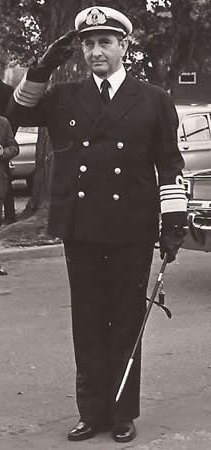
- Admiral Franco in 1982
- Born: 8 August 1927; Adrogué, Buenos Aires Province, Argentina
- Died: 28 May 2025 (aged 97); Buenos Aires, Argentina
- Alma mater: Escuela Naval Militar
- Military career
- Allegiance: Argentina
- branch: Argentine Navy
- Rank: Admiral
- Commands: Member of the Argentine Military Junta (along with Cristino Nicolaides and Augusto Jorge Hughes); Argentine Navy Command
- Known for: Repression
- Conflicts: Falklands War

Signature
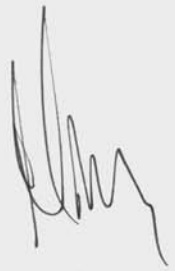

Rubén Oscar Franco (Spanish pronunciation: [ruˈβen ˈos.kaɾ ˈfɾaŋ.ko]; 8 August 1927 – 28 May 2025) was an Argentinian military officer who held power as a member of the Argentine Military Junta from 1982 to 1983. Representing the Argentine Navy, he took power after the Falklands War, later yielding this power to a new legally constituted government headed by Raúl Alfonsín.

Franco assumed the title of Admiral after the army's decision to dissolve the military dictatorship, under which Argentina had been suffering.

After Omar Graffigna's death on 9 December 2019, Franco was the last living former member of Argentina's notorious military juntas.

== Military career ==
Bearing the rank of Captain, Franco was from June 1977 until January 1978 Chief of Staff at Naval Operations Command (Spanish: Comando de Adiestramiento y Alistamiento de la Armada — literally "Navy Training and Enlistment Command"). He then headed the Presidency's Public Information Secretariat from 1 February to 12 December 1978.

From February 1979 until January 1980, Franco was second in command of Navy General Staff Operations. Beginning in 1980, when he bore the rank of counter admiral (roughly equivalent to rear admiral), he headed the General Directorate of Naval Personnel.

=== Command of the Argentine Navy ===
On 1 October 1982, a few months after Argentina's defeat in the Falklands War, Admiral Jorge Isaac Anaya went into retirement and named Vice Admiral Rubén Oscar Franco to head the Argentine Navy Command, thus also at once raising Franco's rank to admiral.

Franco himself retired on Saturday 10 December 1983, and on 16 December 1983, only six days after democracy's return to Argentina, President Raúl Alfonsín named Counter Admiral Ramón Antonio Arosa as the new Commander of the Argentine Navy.

== Prosecutions ==
Those who belonged to the last Military Junta – as Franco did – were not prosecuted in 1985 in the Trial of the Juntas given that they were not included in President Alfonsín's decree, which ordered the promotion of legal proceedings, but they were indicted in connection with signing the so-called Final Document on the Fight against Subversion and Terrorism (Spanish: Documento Final sobre la Lucha contra la Subversión y el Terrorismo), and with sanctioning a "self-amnesty law" (Spanish: ley de autoamnistía) in 1983, under which they sought to grant themselves amnesty from prosecution before the new democratic government had a chance to try them for any wrongdoing. The law might well have served to cover up the junta's practice of taking young children away from detained mothers during the Dirty War.

=== Spanish request for extradition ===
In 1997, Spanish judge Baltasar Garzón sought to detain and extradite 45 Argentinian military officers, among them Rubén Franco, and one civilian to Spain to try them for genocide, state terrorism and torture of political prisoners by the de facto régime that held sway in Argentina from 1976 to 1983, but the request was rejected several times by the Argentine government, invoking the principle of territoriality. On 27 July 2003, however, President Néstor Kirchner's Decree 420/03 modified that criterion and ordered the "obligatoriness of the judicial process", thus opening the way to extraditing the officers that Spain had asked for. In August the same year, the then Prime Minister of Spain, José María Aznar ordered an end to the extradition proceedings, but this decision was struck down by the Supreme Court of Spain in 2005, which led to the consequent reactivation of the extradition requests.

=== Taking children away ===
Subsequently, Admiral (ret.) Franco was further indicted for other crimes that arose from removing children from their families during the Dirty War. Carlos Menem's pardons did not extend to such crimes. On 5 July 2012, however, the tribunal that had earlier passed judgement on Franco acquitted him of the charges that had been brought against him.

== New trial ==
In March 2013 a new trial was begun within which various threads of the so-called Megacausa ESMA were woven together; Megacausa ESMA is a series of investigations into the crimes perpetrated by the various juntas during the Dirty War ("ESMA" is an acronym for Escuela de Mecánica de la Armada, or "Navy Mechanic School" — a reference to one of the clandestine detention and torture centres kept by the Argentine military). In 2016 Franco was still being tried on new charges involving the crimes of illegally depriving others of freedom, application of torture, and torture followed by death, in cases relating to 12 victims. These crimes were aggravated by his being a public official.

== Death ==
Franco died in Buenos Aires on 28 May 2025, at the age of 97.

== See also ==
- Anexo:Denunciados en la megacausa ESMA List of defendants in Megacausa ESMA (in Spanish)
- Anexo:Sentencias de juicios por delitos de lesa humanidad en Argentina List of sentences in trials for crimes against humanity (in Spanish)
- National Reorganization Process
- Dirty War
