= General Manuel Belgrano =

Coordinates: 24°56′25″S 59°01′39″W

- Interactive map of General Manuel Belgrano
- Country: Argentina
- Province: Formosa Province
- Time zone: UTC−3 (ART)
- Climate: Cfa

General Manuel Belgrano is a settlement in northern Argentina. It is located in Formosa Province.
