= Martín Balza =

Argentine general and diplomat

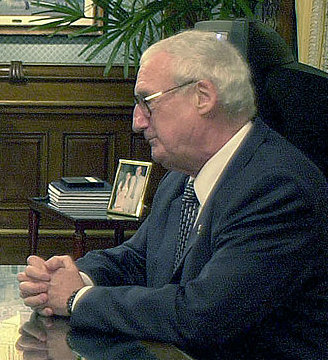
- Balza in 2003
- Born: Martín Antonio Balza; 13 June 1934 (age 92); Salto, Buenos Aires, Argentina
- Occupations: Lieutenant general, ambassador
- Awards: Legion of Honour; Argentine Army Military Merit Medal; United Nations Medal

Signature
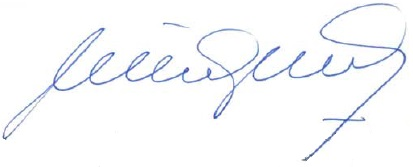

Lieutenant General Martín Antonio Balza (born 13 June 1934) is an Argentine military former Chief of Staff of the Argentine Army. From 2003 to 2011 he was Argentine ambassador to the Republic of Colombia.

A man of strong democratic convictions, he stood up for the legitimate government in every attempted coup d'état throughout his senior career. He also gave the first institutional self-criticism about the Armed Forces' involvement in the 1976 coup and the ensuing reign of terror.

== Career ==
Balza is an artillery officer specialised in mountain warfare.

In 1982, with the rank of Lieutenant Colonel he participated in the Falklands War as commander of the 3rd Artillery Group. He was awarded the Argentine Army to the Military Merit Medal for his conduct during this campaign.

In 1991 he became Chief of Staff of the Argentine Army during the presidencies of Carlos Menem and Fernando De la Rua. During this period Human Rights Watch mentions the following incident:

The military coup of 1976, he said, was a tragic miscalculation: "the armed forces, and among them the army, for which I have the responsibility of speaking, thought erroneously that society did not possess the necessary antibodies to confront the scourge [of violent left-wing subversion] and with the backing of many, took power." The armed forces, he said, were ill-prepared to combat urban terrorism and resorted to methods, such as torture and extrajudicial execution ("obtaining information by illegitimate methods even to the point of extinguishing life") that can never be justifiable. It was a crime, Balza said, to give immoral orders: "no one is obliged to follow such orders, and the person who does incurs the moral and legal consequences of their actions."

— Argentina by Human Rights Watch

In 2003 he caused a stir as he declared his conviction that in 1978 Chile would have won the war during the Beagle conflict.

In 2009, his superior in the Falklands War, Mario Menéndez claimed that oft-quoted figure of 30,000 disappeared people during the 1976-1983 Argentine military dictatorship was "invented number" and lambasted him for supporting the 30,000 figure. Menendez also criticized Balza for not owning up to his role in the Dirty War and for portraying Argentine officers in his book Malvinas: Gesta e Incompetencia (Editorial Atlántida, 2003) as "idiots or pusillanimous."

On 5 April 2011 he came under severe criticism from Fundación Víctimas Visibles and Colombian army general Julio Eduardo Echarry Solano for denying the Marxist ERP and Peronist Montoneros guerrilla groups still remained a menace in the months previous to the coup in Argentina and for stating that Argentine victims of left-wing guerrilla groups in Argentina had no recourse to justice for their time to do so with the Statute of Limitations had expired.

== Decorations and badges ==
- Legion of Honour
- Argentine Army to the Military Merit Medal
- United Nations Medal

| Order of Military Merit (Grand Officer, 1994; Grand Cross, 1995; Brazil) |
| Legion of Merit (Commander; USA; 1994) |
