= Army General Staff (Argentina) =

- Estado Mayor General del Ejército
- Country: Argentina
- Branch: Argentine Army
- Type: Staff
- Part of: President of the Argentine Nation
- Garrison/HQ: Libertador Building
- Engagements: Argentine War of Independence, Dirty War, Operation Independence, Falklands War

Commanders
- Current commander: Brigadier general Carlos Alberto Presti

The Army General Staff (Estado Mayor General del Ejército, EMGE) is the supreme staff of the Argentine Army. It is based at the Libertador Building, Buenos Aires. The current chief is the brigadier general Carlos Alberto Presti.

== History ==
The Army General Staff was created on 16 November 1811, at the request of the First Triumvirate. The first leader of the General Staff was Colonel Francisco Javier de Viana.

On 2 January 1884, within the broader context of the reorganization of the country's military forces, the President of Argentina and Lieutenant general Julio Argentino Roca, decreed that the creation of the Army General Staff position was a permanent change.

== Organization ==
=== Chief of the Army General Staff ===
Source: Argentina.gob.ar

- JEMGE Assistantship Secretariat (SAJEMGE). Base: Libertador Building (CABA).
- Army Procurement Assessment Commission (CECE). Base: San Telmo (CABA).
- Army General Inspectorate (IGE). Base: Libertador Building (CABA).
- General Secretary of the Army (SGE). Base: Palermo (CABA).
- General Directorate of Plans, Programs and Budget (DGPPP). Base: Libertador Building (CABA).
- General Directorate of Administration and Finance (DGAF). Base: Libertador Building (CABA).
- General Directorate of Legal Affairs (DGAJ). Base: Libertador Building (CABA).

=== Deputy Chief of the Army General Staff ===
Source: Argentina.gob.ar

- EMGE Accounting and Finance Department (DCF). Base: Libertador Building (CABA).
- Coordination Secretariat of the SUBJEMGE (SC SUBJEMGE). Base: Libertador Building (CABA).
- EMGE Headquarters (Cu Gral EMGE). Base: Libertador Building (CABA).
- General Directorate of Education «Lieutenant General Pablo Riccheri» (DGE). Guar Ej Campo de Mayo (BA).
- Command of the Buenos Aires Military Garrison «Colonel Doctor Roque Sáenz Peña» (CGMBA). Guar Ej Campo de Mayo (BA).
- General Directorate of Communications and Informatics (DGCI). Base: Libertador Building (CABA).
- General Directorate of Personnel and Welfare (DGPB). Base: Libertador Building (CABA).
- General Directorate of Health (DGS). Base: Parque Patricios (CABA).6
- General Directorate of Intelligence (DG Icia). Base: Libertador Building (CABA).
- Engineering and Infrastructure Directorate (DGII). Base: Libertador Building (CABA).
- General Directorate of Research and Development (DGID). Base: Libertador Building (CABA).
- General Directorate of Organization and Doctrine (DGOD). Base: Libertador Building (CABA).
- Remount and Veterinary Directorate (DRV). Base: Palermo CABA.
- General Directorate of Materiel (DGM). Base: Palermo CABA.
- General Directorate of Administration (DG Int). Guar Ej El Palomar (BA).
- Army Historical Affairs Directorate (DAHE). Base: San Telmo (CABA).

== Chiefs ==
The Chief of the Army General Staff is the brigadier general Carlos Alberto Presti, who holds the office since 2 January 2024.
