= Colonia Benítez =

Coordinates: 27°20′S 58°56′W

- Municipality and village
- Interactive map of Colonia Benítez
- Country: Argentina
- Province: Chaco Province
- Time zone: UTC−3 (ART)

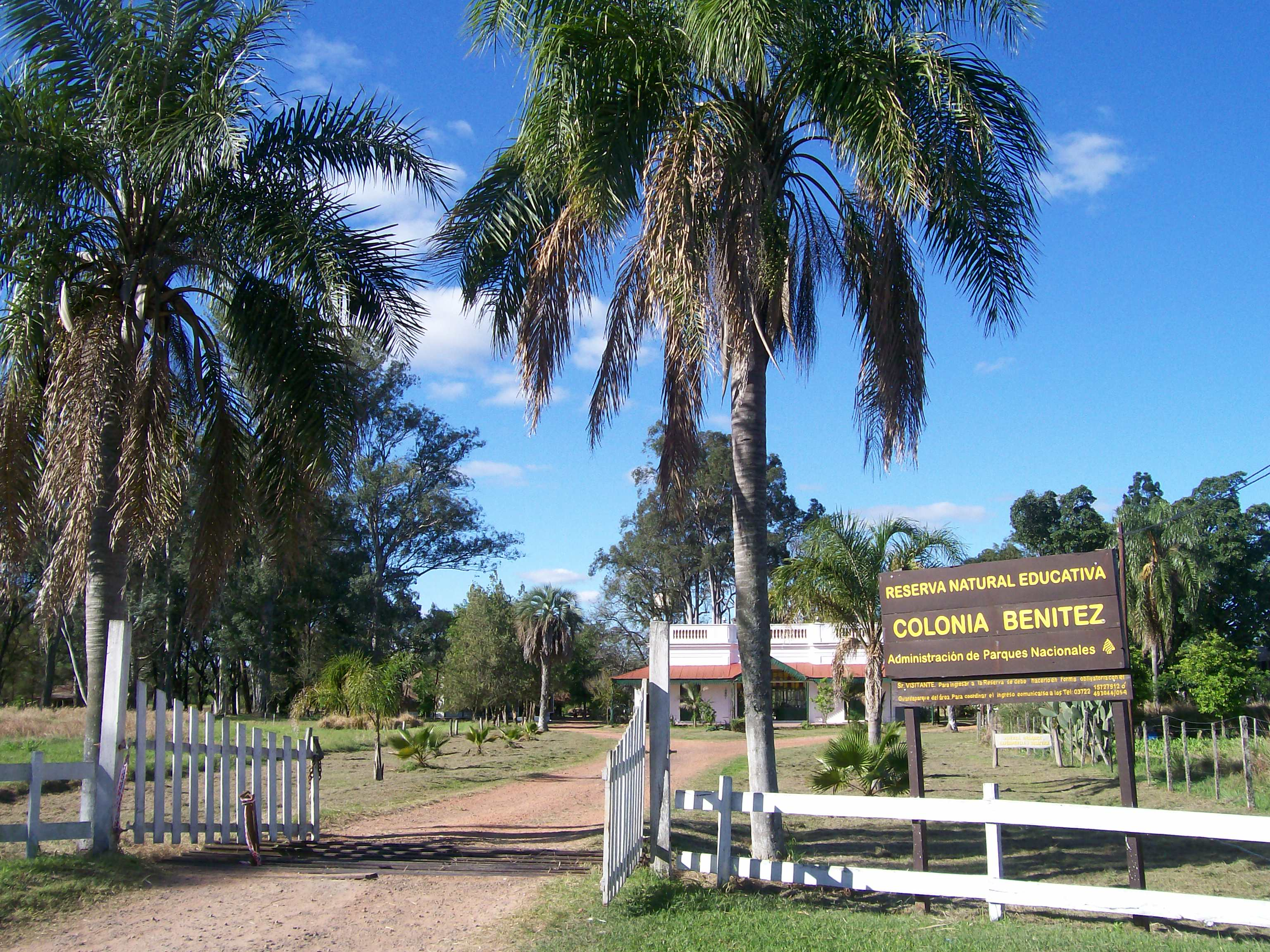
Colonia Benítez

Colonia Benítez is a village and municipality in Chaco Province in northern Argentina. It was one of the first towns and agricultural settlements of the province, when the cultivation of cotton and various industries were the pillars of its development with over the years.
