= Jorge Rafael Videla =

President of Argentina from 1976 to 1981

General Jorge Rafael Videla
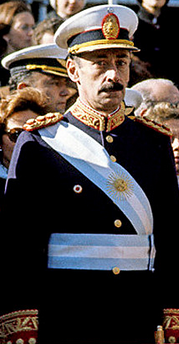
- Videla in 1978

42nd President of Argentina
- In office 29 March 1976 – 29 March 1981
- Vice President: Vacant
- Preceded by: Isabel Perón
- Succeeded by: Roberto Eduardo Viola

Governor of Tucumán
- In office 4 August 1970 – 10 December 1970
- Preceded by: Jorge Daniel Nanclares
- Succeeded by: Carlos Alfredo Imbaud

Personal details
- Born: 2 August 1925 Mercedes, Buenos Aires, Argentina
- Died: 17 May 2013 (aged 87) Marcos Paz, Buenos Aires, Argentina
- Resting place: Memorial Cemetery, Pilar, Buenos Aires
- Party: Independent
- Other political affiliations: Colorados
- Spouse: Alicia Raquel Hartridge (m. 1948)
- Children: 7
- Education: Colegio Militar de la Nación
- Profession: Military

Military service
- Allegiance: Argentina
- Branch/service: Argentine Army
- Years of service: 1944–1981
- Rank: (Pre-1991 epaulette) Lieutenant General
- Commands: Argentine Army (1976–1981)
- Battles/wars: Dirty War; Operation Charly; Beagle conflict; Operation Soberanía

Criminal details
- Conviction(s): Crimes against humanity; illegal repression during the last military dictatorship
- Penalty: Life imprisonment
- Trial: Trial of the Juntas
- Imprisoned at: Marcos Paz Prison
- Status: Deceased

General Jorge Rafael Videla (/vɪˈdɛlə/ vid-EL-ə; Spanish: [ˈxoɾxe rafaˈel βiˈðela]; 2 August 1925 – 17 May 2013) was an Argentine general, politician and dictator who served as the president of Argentina from 1976 to 1981 during the National Reorganization Process.

He came to power in a March 1976 coup d'état that deposed Isabel Perón. His rule, which occurred during the Dirty War (1974–1983), was among the most infamous in Latin America during the Cold War due to widespread human rights abuses including murder, abduction, torture of activists and political opponents along with their families at secret concentration camps. In addition, the children of female prisoners were systematically kidnapped. An estimated 13,000 to 30,000 political dissidents were killed or disappeared during this period. Videla relinquished power to Roberto Viola in March 1981.

In 1985, two years after the return of a representative democratic government, he was prosecuted in the Trial of the Juntas and convicted for large-scale human rights abuses and crimes against humanity during his rule. He was released in 1990, following a pardon from President Carlos Menem. Videla was arrested again in 1998 after he was found guilty of the kidnapping of children. He remained under house arrest until 10 October 2008, when he was sent to a military prison. On 5 July 2010, Videla took full responsibility for his army's actions during his rule. Following a new trial, on 22 December 2010, Videla was sentenced to life in a civilian prison for the deaths of 31 prisoners following his coup. On 5 July 2012, Videla was sentenced to 50 years in civilian prison for the systematic kidnapping of children during his tenure. The following year, Videla died in the Marcos Paz civilian prison five days after falling in a shower.

== Early life and family ==
Jorge Rafael Videla was born on 2 August 1925 in the city of Mercedes. He was the third of five sons born to Colonel Rafael Eugenio Videla Bengolea (1888–1951) and María Olga Redondo Ojea (1897–1987) and was christened in honor of his two older twin brothers, who had died of measles in 1923. Videla's family was a prominent one in San Luis Province, and many of his ancestors had held high public offices. His grandfather Jacinto had been governor of San Luis between 1891 and 1893, and his great-great-grandfather Blas Videla had fought in the Spanish American wars of independence and had later been a leader of the Unitarian Party in San Luis.

He began his primary studies in his hometown, and later continued them at the Colegio San José in Buenos Aires, run by Bayonne parents, where prominent figures from the Argentine political and business scene also studied, including former President Hipólito Yrigoyen.

On 7 April 1948, Videla married Alicia Raquel Hartridge (28 September 1927 – 5 November 2021) daughter of Samuel Alejandro Hartridge Parkes (1891–1969), an English Argentine professor of physics and Argentine ambassador to Turkey, and María Isabel Lacoste Álvarez (1893–1939). They had seven children.

== Army career ==
Videla joined the National Military College (Colegio Militar de la Nación) on 3 March 1942 and graduated on 21 December 1944 with the rank of second lieutenant. After steady promotion as a junior officer in the infantry, he attended the War College between 1952 and 1954 and graduated as a qualified staff officer. Videla served at the Ministry of Defence from 1958 to 1960 and thereafter he directed the Military Academy until 1962. In 1971, he was promoted to brigade general and appointed by Alejandro Agustin Lanusse as Director of the National Military College. In late 1973 the head of the Army, Leandro Anaya, appointed Videla as the Chief of Staff of the Army. During July and August 1975, Videla was the Head of the Joint Chiefs of Staff (Estado Mayor Conjunto) of the Argentine Armed Forces. In August 1975, the President, Isabel Perón, appointed Videla to the Army's senior position, the General Commander of the Army.

Rank	Date of promotion
Second Lieutenant	22 December 1944
Lieutenant	15 June 1947
First Lieutenant	3 November 1949
Captain	1 March 1952
Major	18 July 1958
Lieutenant Colonel	28 December 1961
Colonel	17 January 1966
Brigade General	23 November 1971
Lieutenant General	20 October 1975

== Coup d'état ==
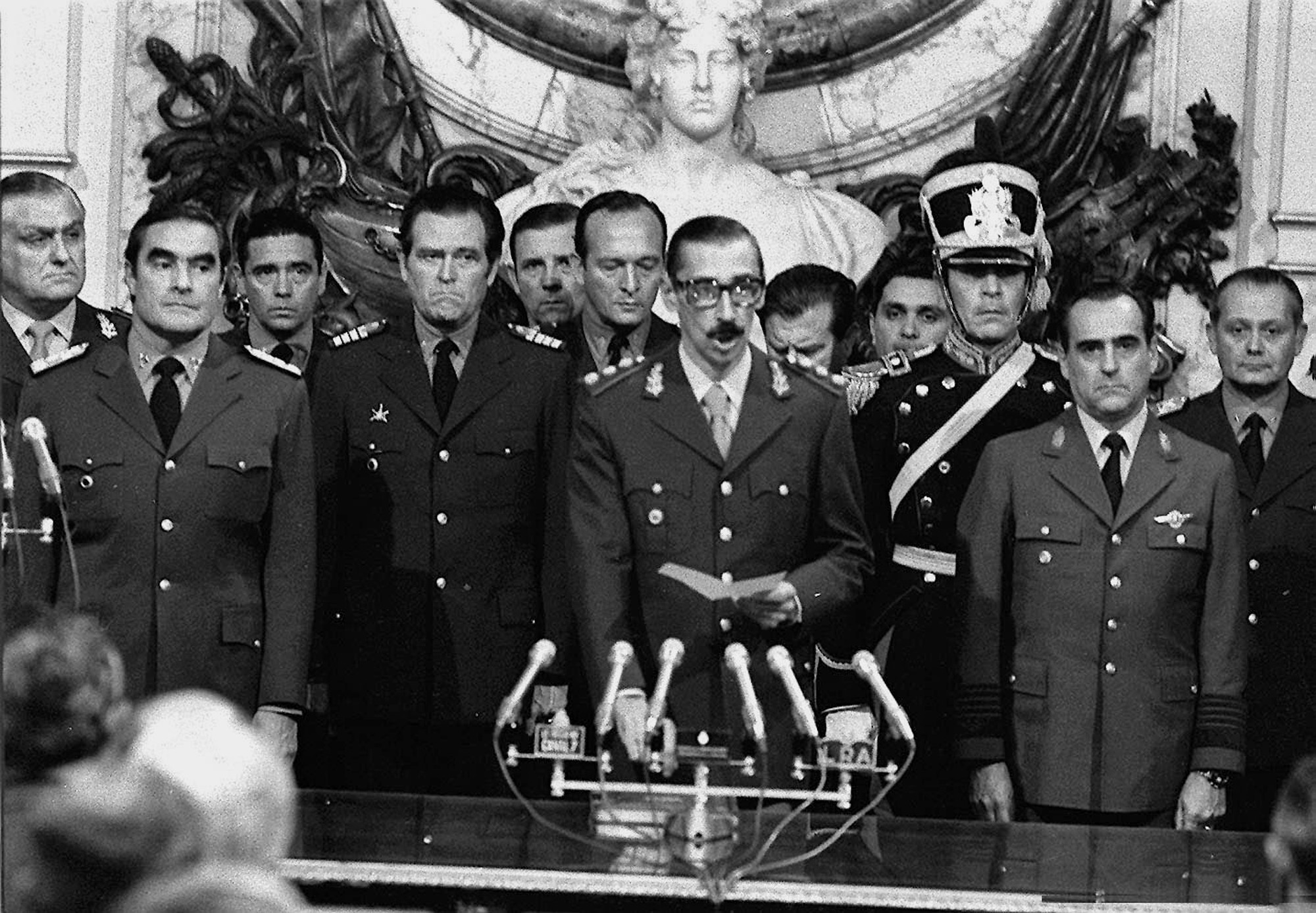
Lieutenant General Jorge Rafael Videla swearing the Oath as President of Argentina, 29 March 1976.

Upon the death of President Juan Perón, his widow and Vice President Isabel became president. Videla headed a military coup which deposed her on 24 March 1976, during increasing violence, social unrest and economic problems. A military junta was formed, made up of him, representing the Army; Admiral Emilio Massera representing the Navy; and Brigadier General Orlando Ramón Agosti representing the Air Force.

== Presidency ==
Two days after the coup, Videla formally assumed the post of President of Argentina.

=== Human rights violations ===
A terrorist is not just someone with a gun or a bomb, but also someone who spreads ideas that are contrary to Western and Christian civilization.

— Jorge Rafael Videla

The military junta is remembered for the forced disappearances of large numbers of students. The military junta took power during a period of terrorist attacks from the Marxist groups ERP, the Montoneros, FAL, FAR and FAP, who had gone underground after Juan Perón's death in July 1974, and violent right-wing kidnappings, tortures and assassinations from the Argentine Anticommunist Alliance, led by José López Rega, Perón's Minister of Social Welfare, and other death squads. The Baltimore Sun reported at the beginning of 1976 that,

In the jungle-covered mountains of Tucuman, long known as 'Argentina's garden', Argentines are fighting Argentines in a Vietnam-style civil war. So far, the outcome is in doubt. But there is no doubt about the seriousness of the combat, which involves 2,000 or so leftist guerrillas and perhaps as many as 10,000 soldiers.

In late 1974 the ERP set up a rural front in Tucumán province and the Argentine Army deployed the 5th Mountain Brigade of the 2nd Army Division in counterinsurgency operations in the province. In early 1976 the mountain brigade was reinforced in the form of the 4th Airborne Brigade that had until then been withheld guarding strategic points in the city of Córdoba against ERP guerrillas and militants.

The members of the junta took advantage of the guerrilla threat to authorize the coup and naming the period in government as the "National Reorganization Process". In all, 293 servicemen and policemen were killed in left-wing terrorist incidents in 1975 and 1976. Videla narrowly escaped three assassination attempts by the Montoneros and ERP between February 1976 and April 1977.

Justice Minister Ricardo Gil Lavedra, who formed part of the 1985 tribunal judging the military crimes committed during the Dirty War, later declared, "I sincerely believe that the majority of the victims of the illegal repression were guerrilla militants". Some 10,000 of the disappeared were guerrillas of the Montoneros, and the People's Revolutionary Army. However, the campaign of repression actually intensified after the guerrillas were defeated and it was during this time, when they targeted the church, labor unions, artists, intellectuals and university students and professors, that the junta accumulated the greatest number of victims.

According to human right groups, an estimated 15,000 to 30,000 Argentines "disappeared" while in the custody of the police or the military. Among the victims were two French nuns (Alice Domon and Léonie Duquet) who had taught and cared for Videla's disabled son, Alejandro. Some 1,500 to 4,000 were drugged into a stupor, loaded into military aircraft, stripped naked and then thrown into the Rio de la Plata and Atlantic Ocean to drown in what became known as "death flights." Between 10,000 and 12,000 of the "disappeared," PEN (Poder Ejecutivo Nacional) detainees held in clandestine detention camps throughout the dictatorship, were eventually released under diplomatic pressure. Terence Roehrig estimates that of the disappeared "at least 10,000 were involved in various ways with the guerrillas".

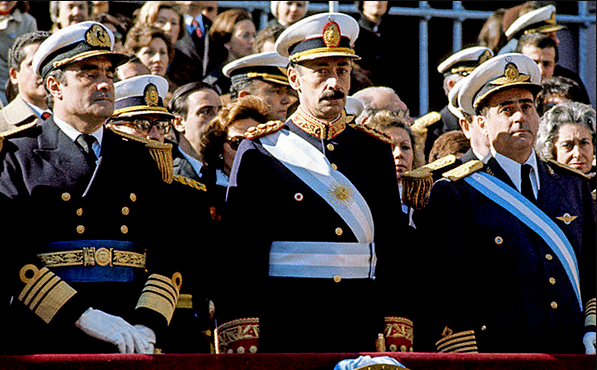
Lieutenant General Jorge Rafael Videla at a military parade in Buenos Aires, 1978.

In the book Disposición Final by Argentine journalist Ceferino Reato, Videla confirms for the first time that between 1976 and 1983, 8,000 Argentines have been murdered by his regime. The bodies were hidden or destroyed to prevent protests at home and abroad. Videla also maintained that female guerrilla detainees allowed themselves to become pregnant in the belief they would not be tortured or executed, but they were. The children whom they bore in prison were taken from them, illegally adopted by military families of the regime, and their identities were hidden for decades.

Despite the government officially denouncing antisemitism, the Argentine Jewish community were disturbed by the actions committed by Videla's regime, with one 1977 Jewish source suggesting 600 of the 8,000 killed, arrested or kidnapped since the coup had been Jews. According to human rights organisations in Argentina, between 1,900 and 3,000 Jews were among the 30,000 who were targeted by the Argentine military junta. It is a disproportionate number, as Jews comprised between 5–12% of those targeted but only 1% of the population. Historian Daniel Muchnik attributed this to many Jews gravitating to political activism and armed resistance groups such as the ERP and FAP during the period. However, testimonies from Jewish Argentines suggest that they were targeted for being Jewish. Many torture victims were said to have seen pictures of Adolf Hitler and swastikas on walls of torture chambers and interrogators uttering antisemitic epithets. Jews were also known to have suffered antisemitic harassment while in the Argentine military. Between 200 and 300 Jews were subject to attacks, often by their superiors.

Some 11,000 Argentines have applied for and received up to US$200,000 as monetary compensation from the state for the loss of loved ones during the military dictatorship. The Asamblea por los Derechos Humanos (APDH or Assembly for Human Rights) believes that 12,261 people were killed or disappeared during the "National Reorganization Process". Politically, all legislative power was concentrated in the hands of Videla's nine-man junta, and every important position in the national government was filled with loyal military officers.

=== Economic policy ===
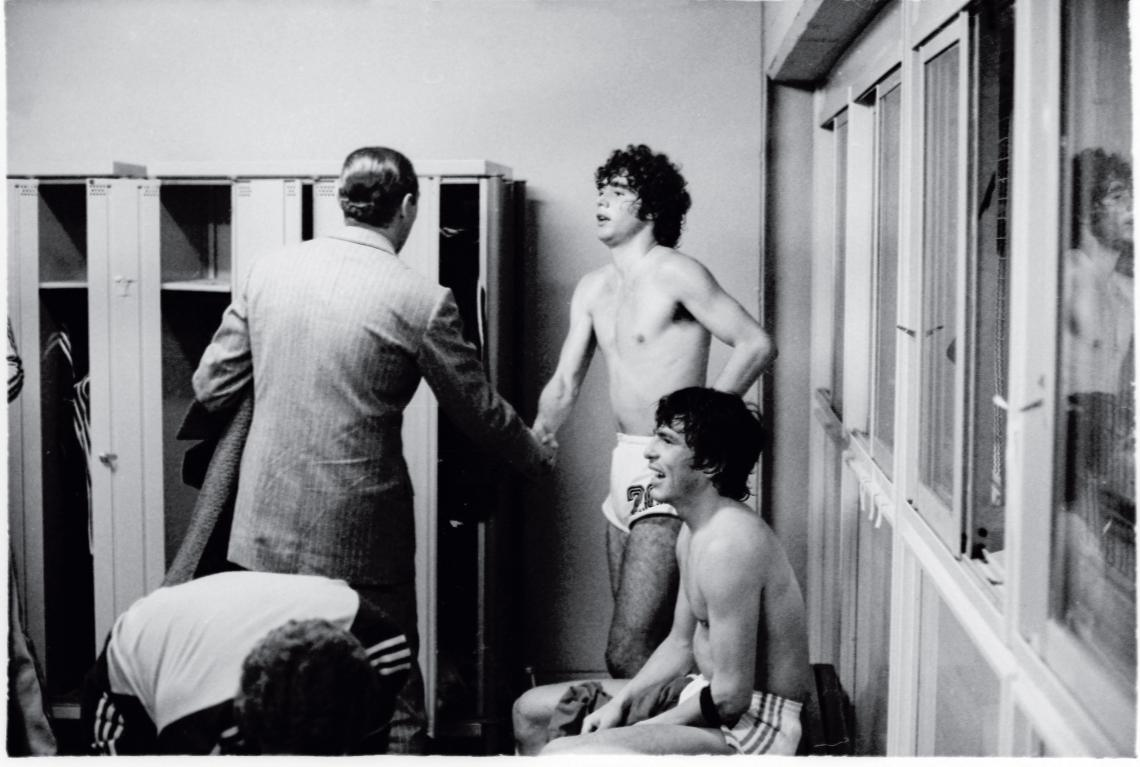
Videla and Alberto Tarantini after the match

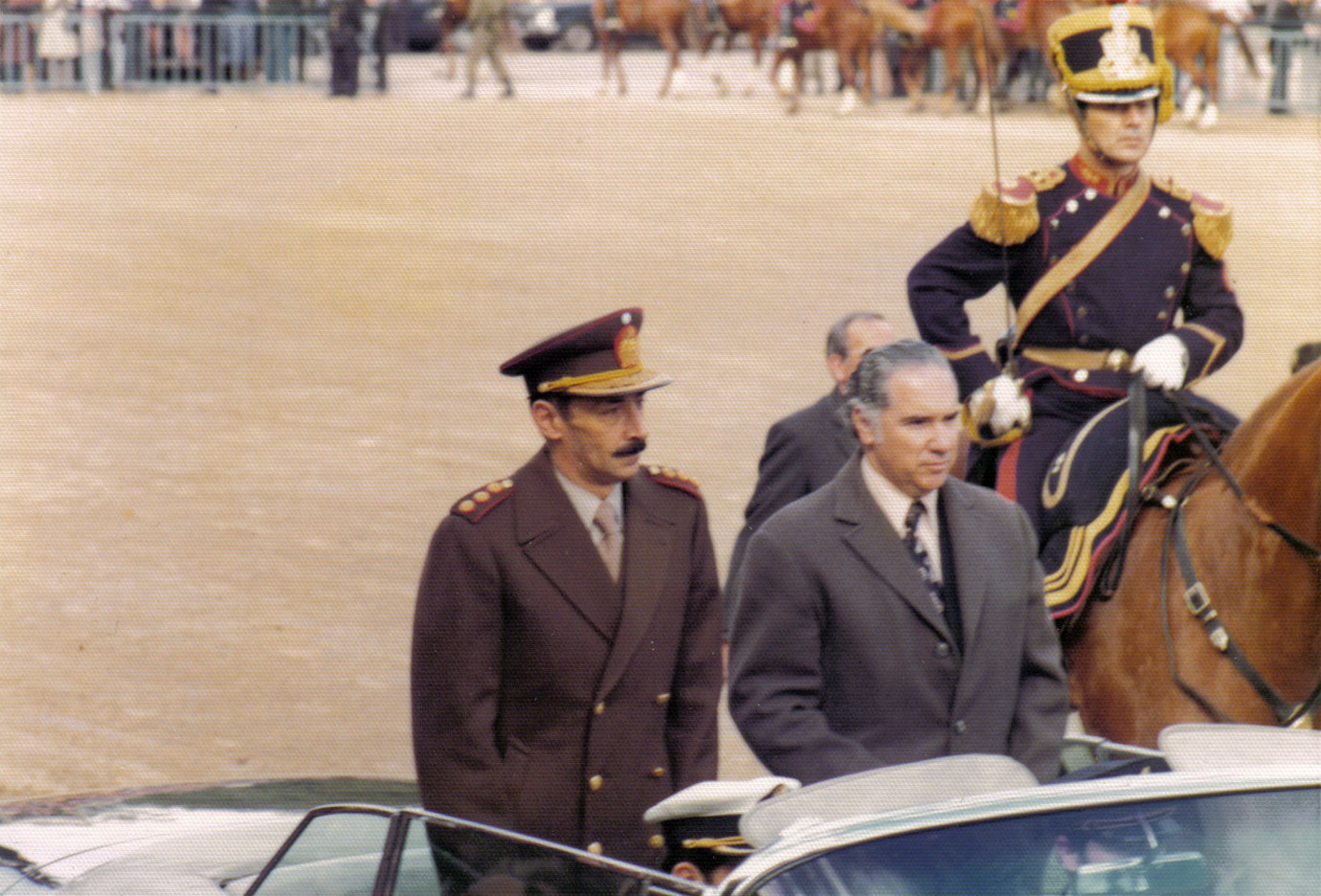
Videla at the opening of 1976's "Exposición Rural" in Palermo, Buenos Aires.

As Argentina's new president, Videla faced a collapsing economy racked by soaring inflation. He largely left economic policies in the hands of Minister José Alfredo Martínez de Hoz, who adopted a free trade and deregulatory economic policy.

Martínez de Hoz took measures to restore economic growth, reversing Peronism in favour of a free market economy. Inflation rate decreased somewhat, but remained still high.

He enjoyed the personal friendship of David Rockefeller, who facilitated Chase Manhattan Bank and International Monetary Fund loans of nearly US$1 billion after his arrival.

He eliminated all price controls and the exchange controls regime. The black market and shortages disappeared.

He freed exports (removed existing prohibitions and quotas and export taxes were repealed) and imports (removed existing prohibitions, quotas, and licenses and gradually reduced import tariffs).

During his tenure, the foreign debt increased fourfold, and disparities between the upper and lower classes became much more pronounced. The period ended in a tenfold devaluation and one of the worst financial crises in Argentine history.

=== Foreign relations ===
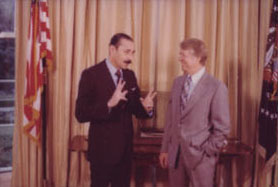
Videla with U.S. President Jimmy Carter at the White House on 9 September 1977

The coup d'état had been planned since October 1975, and the United States Department of State learned of the preparations two months before its execution. Secretary of State Henry Kissinger met several times with Argentine Armed Forces leaders after the coup, urging them to destroy their opponents quickly before outcry over human rights abuses grew in the United States.

The State Department saw Argentina as a bulwark of anti-communism in South America and in early April 1976, Congress approved a request by the Gerald Ford Administration, written by Henry Kissinger, to grant $50 million in security assistance to the junta. In 1977, the U.S. Department of Defense authorized $700,000 to train 217 Argentine military officers and in 1977 and 1978, the U.S. sold more than $120 million in spare military parts to Argentina.

However, President Jimmy Carter, who took office in January 1977, highlighted issues of human rights in Latin America, including in Argentina. In August 1977, he signed the Kennedy-Humphrey Amendment to the International Security Assistance Act (H.R. 6884), which prohibited all U.S. military aid, training, and arms sales to Argentina and went into effect in October 1978.

During Videla's regime, Argentina rejected the binding Report and decision of the Court of Arbitration over the Beagle conflict (about possession of the Picton, Lennox and Nueva islands) at the southern tip of South America and started Operation Soberanía in order to invade the islands. In 1978, however, Pope John Paul II opened a mediation process. His representative, Antonio Samorè, successfully prevented full-scale war.

The conflict was not completely resolved until after Videla's time as president. Once democratic rule was restored in 1983, the Treaty of Peace and Friendship of 1984 between Chile and Argentina (Tratado de Paz y Amistad), which acknowledged Chilean sovereignty over the islands, was signed and ratified by popular referendum.

Although Videla was anti-Communist, his regime maintained good relations with the Soviet Union and China; trade ties with both were expanded under his rule.

=== Public relations ===
One of Videla's greatest challenges was his image abroad. He attributed criticism over human rights to an anti-Argentine campaign. On 19 May 1976, he attended a luncheon with a group of Argentine intellectuals, including Ernesto Sábato, Jorge Luis Borges, Horacio Esteban Ratti (president of the Argentine Writers Society) and Father Leonardo Castellani. The latter expressed to Videla his concern regarding the disappearance of another writer, Haroldo Conti.

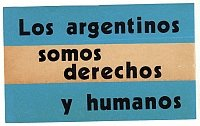
Bumper sticker commissioned by the junta in 1979. The text is a pun on derechos humanos, "human rights". "We Argentines are righteous and humane"

On 30 April 1977, Azucena Villaflor, along with 13 other women, started demonstrations on the Plaza de Mayo, in front of the Casa Rosada presidential palace, demanding to be told the whereabouts of their disappeared children. They became known as the Mothers of the Plaza de Mayo (Madres de Plaza de Mayo).

During a human rights investigation in September 1979, the Inter-American Commission on Human Rights denounced Videla's government, citing many disappearances and instances of abuse. In response, the junta hired the Burson-Marsteller ad agency to formulate a pithy comeback: Los argentinos somos derechos y humanos (Literally, "We the Argentines are righteous and humane"). The slogan was printed on 250,000 bumper stickers and distributed to motorists throughout Buenos Aires to create the appearance of a spontaneous support of pro-junta sentiment, at a cost of approximately $16,117.

Videla used the 1978 FIFA World Cup for political purposes. He cited the enthusiasm of the Argentine fans for their victorious football team as evidence of his personal and the junta's popularity.

In 1980, Adolfo Pérez Esquivel, leader of the Peace and Justice Service, was awarded the Nobel Peace Prize for reporting many of Argentina's human rights violations to the world at large.

== Personal interference in the 1978 FIFA World Cup ==
During the Argentina v Peru match, Argentina the host of the Cup would need to defeat Peru to advance ahead in Group B. The match ended in a 6–0 Argentine victory. Before the game started Videla and Henry Kissinger went into the Peruvian's locker room and read a message about Argentine-Peruvian brotherhood by the Peruvian dictator Francisco Morales Bermúdez declared by José Velásquez and Germán Leguía. While no evidence of bribes, in the book How They Stole the Game, British investigative historian David Yallop detailed allegations that Argentine dictator General Jorge Rafael Videla directed Rear Admiral Carlos Alberto Lacoste to arrange a fixed result for the June 1978 World Cup match between Argentina and Peru. Lacoste was the head of the 1978 World Cup organizing committee (EAM'78). Former prisoner of the regime Norberto Liwski said "I think the 1978 World Cup is one of the deep wounds of Argentine society."

== Later life ==
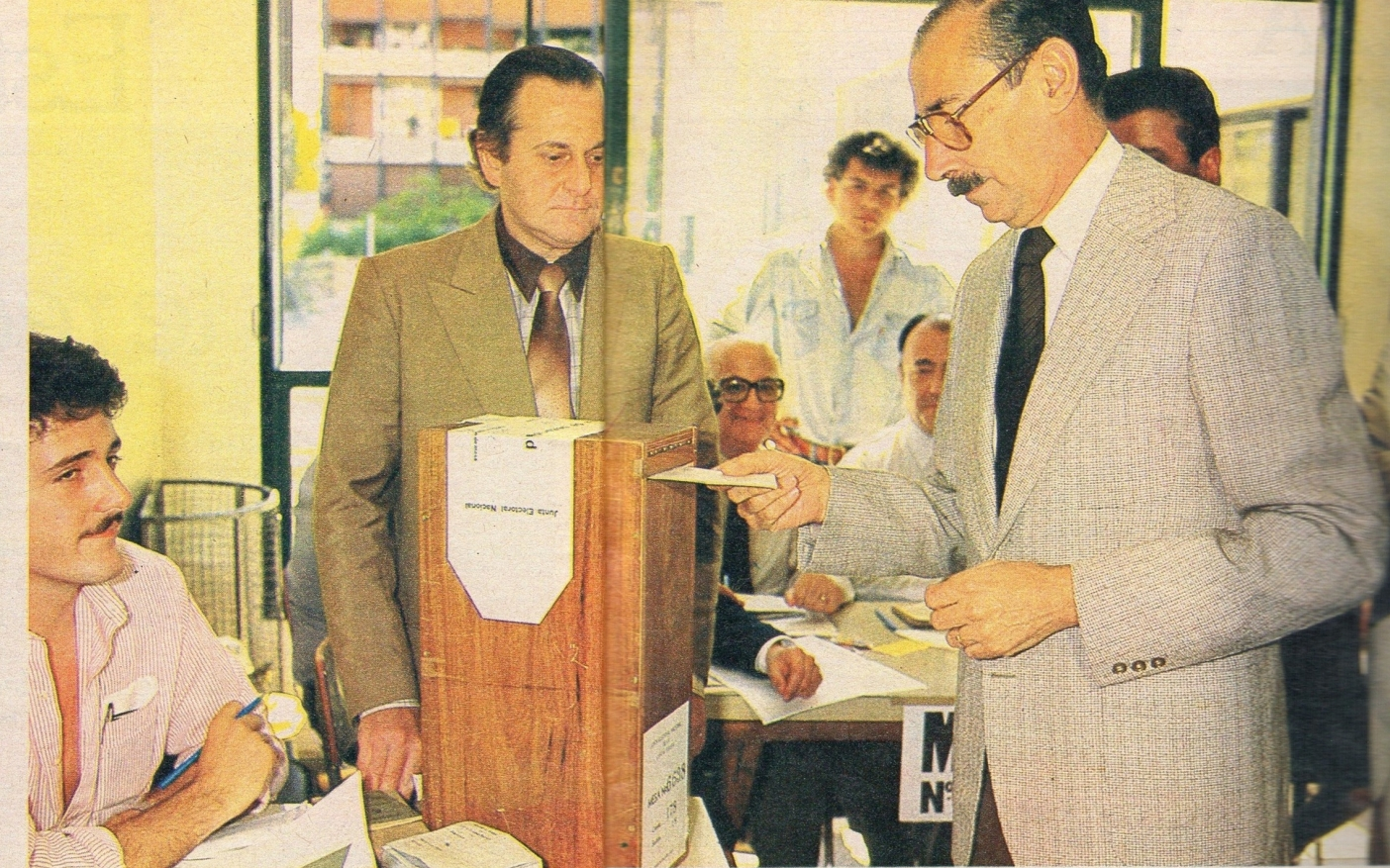
Videla voting in the 1983 Argentine general election, which marked the restoration of democracy after the end of the Process.

Videla relinquished power to Roberto Viola on 29 March 1981. On 7 April 1982, Videla attended the swearing-in ceremony of General Mario Benjamín Menéndez as governor of the Malvinas Islands. That same month, the Falklands War began against the United Kingdom. Argentina's swift defeat in the war precipitated the collapse of its military regime. Democracy in the country was restored in 1983.

In what was called the Trial of the Juntas, the new Argentinian government prosecuted high-ranking officers for crimes committed during the dictatorship. Videla was convicted of numerous homicides, kidnapping, torture, and many other crimes. He was sentenced to life imprisonment and was discharged from the military in 1985.

He was imprisoned for five years. In 1990, President Carlos Menem pardoned Videla and many other imprisoned former members of the military regime. Menem also pardoned the leftist guerrilla commanders accused of terrorism. In a televised address to the nation, President Menem said, "I have signed the decrees so we may begin to rebuild the country in peace, in liberty and in justice ... We come from long and cruel confrontations. There was a wound to heal."

Videla briefly returned to prison in 1998 when a judge found him guilty of the kidnapping of babies during the Dirty War, including the child of the desaparecida Silvia Quintela, and the disappearances of the commanders of the People's Revolutionary Army (ERP), Mario Roberto Santucho and Benito Urteaga. Videla spent 38 days in the old part of the Caseros Prison. Due to health issues, he was later transferred to house arrest.

Following the election of President Néstor Kirchner in 2003, there was a renewed widespread effort in Argentina to show the illegality of Videla's rule. The government no longer recognized Videla as having been a legal president of the country, and his portrait was removed from the military school. In 2003, Congress repealed the Ley de Punto Final, which had ended prosecutions for crimes under the dictatorship. In 2005, the Argentine Supreme Court ruled that the law had been unconstitutional. The government re-opened prosecution of crimes against humanity.

On 6 September 2006, Judge Norberto Oyarbide ruled that the pardons granted by President Menem were unconstitutional. On 25 April 2007, a federal court struck down Videla's presidential pardon and restored his convictions for human rights abuses.

He was put on trial on 2 July 2010 for new charges of human rights violations relating to the deaths of 31 prisoners who died under his rule. Three days later, Videla took full responsibility for his army's actions during his rule, saying, "I accept the responsibility as the highest military authority during the internal war. My subordinates followed my orders." On 22 December 2010, the trial ended, and Videla was convicted and sentenced to life in prison. He was ordered to be transferred to a civilian prison immediately after the trial. In handing down the sentence, judge María Elba Martínez said that Videla was "a manifestation of state terrorism." During the trial, Videla said that "yesterday's enemies are in power and from there, they are trying to establish a Marxist regime" in Argentina.

On 5 July 2012, Videla was convicted and sentenced to 50 years imprisonment for his participation in a scheme to steal babies from parents detained by the military regime. According to the court decision, Videla was an accomplice "in the crimes of theft, retention and hiding of minors, as well as replacing their identities." The infants were given to military families for illegal adoption, and their identities were hidden. An estimated 400–500 babies were stolen during this period, often from mothers who gave birth in prison and who were later "disappeared". By June 2019, 130 of the adoptees had their identities restored. Throughout the trial, Videla described himself as a political prisoner and said in his closing remarks that any child abductions which took place were not part of a systematic plan:

"The women giving birth, who I respect as mothers, were militants who were active in the machine of terror. Many used their unborn children as human shields."

=== Death ===
On 17 May 2013, Videla was reported as having died of natural causes in his sleep while serving his sentence at a Marcos Paz prison. An autopsy revealed he died from multiple fractures and internal hemorrhaging caused by having slipped in a prison shower on 12 May. According to a 2009 ruling by the military, he (and others convicted of human rights violations) were not eligible for a military funeral. A private ceremony was held by his family.

Human rights organizations across the political spectrum denounced Videla, saying he died without admitting he was aware of the disappeared persons and kidnapped children. None of the tried ex-officers has provided details about the fate of the missing. Videla appeared mostly unrepentant for the actions against those whom he deemed terrorist subversives.

Several Argentine politicians commented on his death. Deputy Ricardo Gil Lavedra of the Radical Civic Union said that Videla will be remembered as a dictator, while Hermes Binner expressed condolences to the victims of his government. Hernán Lombardi, Minister of Culture of Buenos Aires city, praised Argentine democracy for having tried and sentenced the dictator. Ricardo Alfonsín said it was good that Videla had died in prison. Adolfo Pérez Esquivel, Argentine recipient of the 1980 Nobel Peace Prize, said, "The death of Videla should not delight anybody, we have to keep working for a better society, more just, more humane, so that all that horror never happens again".

Cabinet Chief Juan Manuel Abal Medina said that he was glad that, "Videla died prosecuted, sentenced and imprisoned in a common cell, repudiated by the Argentine people". At the time of Videla's death he was one of two surviving dictators of Argentina. The last surviving president from the dictatorship, Reynaldo Bignone, died on 7 March 2018.

Videla remained a Roman Catholic until the end of his life.

== See also ==
- Albano Harguindeguy

Military offices
Preceded by Ernesto Della Croce	Head of the Joint Chiefs of Staff; Jul–Aug 1975	Succeeded by Eduardo Betti
Preceded by Arturo Numa Laplane	General Commander of the Army; 1975–1978	Succeeded by Roberto Eduardo Viola as Commander-in-Chief of the Army
Political offices
Preceded by Jorge Daniel Nanclares	Governor of Tucumán; Aug–Dec 1974	Succeeded by Carlos Alfredo Imbaud
Preceded by Isabel Perón	President of Argentina; 1976–1981	Succeeded by Roberto Eduardo Viola
Sporting positions
Preceded by Gustav Heinemann	The person who opened the FIFA World Cup; 1978	Succeeded by Juan Carlos I
