= Jorge Chevalier =

Argentine general

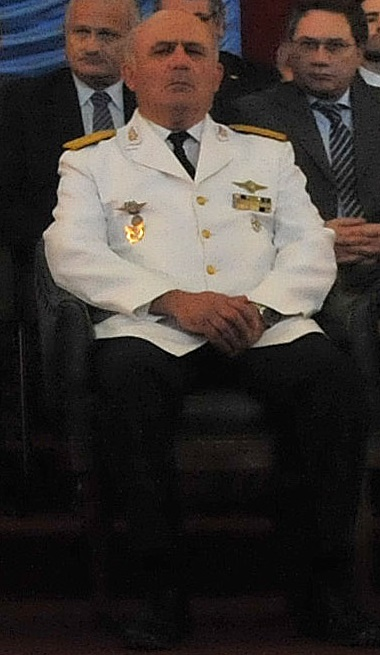

Chief of the Joint Chiefs of Staff of the Armed Forces of the Argentine Republic
- In office 20 May 2003 – 26 June 2013
- Preceded by: Juan Carlos Mugnolo
- Succeeded by: Luis María Carena

Personal details
- Born: 4 January 1947 (age 79) Córdoba Province, Argentina

Military service
- Allegiance: Argentina
- Branch/service: Argentine Air Force
- Years of service: 1975–2013
- Rank: Brigadier general

Jorge Alberto Chevalier (born 4 January 1947) is a retired Argentine general who held the Chief of the Joint Chiefs of Staff from 2003 to until 2013. He is the only longest serving chief of the Argentine armed forces holding the position for 10 years.

== Appointment as ==
Chevalier was appointed by the then President Néstor Kirchner with just 8 weeks of assuming the office of President of Argentine, Alberto Chevalier occupied the office from 20 May 2003 to 26 June 2013.
