= Humanitarian response to the 2010 Chile earthquake =

The humanitarian response to the 2010 Chile earthquake included national governments, charitable and for-profit organizations from around the world which began coordinating humanitarian aid designed to help the Chilean people.

== National governments ==
- Argentina: President Cristina Fernández de Kirchner called President Michelle Bachelet and offered "all the needed aid." Meanwhile, Argentine Ambassador to Chile, Ginés González García, said that his country "will do everything possible" to aid Chile. Medical supplies sent by Argentina had arrived in Chile—the first batch of international relief aid the country has received after Saturday's devastating earthquake, Chile's Defense Ministry said Sunday. On March 1, Chile requested Argentina the sending of three field hospitals, including a similar one deployed in Haiti. President Cristina Kirchner also announced the delivery of 1800 tons of food and more than a half millions liters of water. Four water purifications plants and four electricity power generators were also included. The first C-130 Hercules, of eight scheduled flights, was dispatched on March 1 and the 12 modules Argentine Air Force hospital would be located at Curicó. On March 5 an Air Force Fokker F-28 was sent to Concepcion to evacuate residents On March 6 Argentine Health minister announces the sending of ten thousand doses of vaccine against hepatitis A On March 8, the Argentine Ministry of Defense announced that, after 9 flights, the field hospital at Curico is already operational. On March 13 the benefit concert Argentina Abraza Chile is done at Buenos Aires
- Australia: Prime Minister Kevin Rudd offered any possible assistance to the Chilean government.
- Bolivia: Bolivian President Evo Morales made a visit to Chile and was the only president to carry food an aid on his plane, then he announced half of his monthly salary will be donated to the earthquake tragedy of Chile and Haiti, Bolivia sent aid to Chile and the Bolivian people collected $1.3 million for Chile and Haiti.
- Brazil: Brazilian president Luiz Inácio Lula da Silva said that he had "deep concern for the impact of the earthquake" and ordered the cabinet to evaluate Chile's situation and the assistance Brazil could give. An aircraft from the Brazilian Air Force was used to transport Chile's justice minister and attorney general back to Chile. After attending the induction of the Uruguayan President José Mujica, President Lula made a short visit to Santiago to meet President Bachelet. On March 2, 2010, Brasil sent two UH-60 Blackhawk of the Brazilian Air Force to Chile. The Brazilian Air Force has also sent aircraft transporting the Brazilian Navy field hospital and its 47 personnel on March 3.
- Canada: The Canadian government is currently monitoring the situation and is aware of the approximately 1,100 Canadians in Chile. Non-government organizations have already responded, including Global Medic, from Toronto, will reassign volunteers already in Haiti, the Canadian Red Cross is also monitoring the situation and Canadian embassies along the western seaboard, as well as Vancouver, where the 2010 Olympics were being held, have been put on alert. The Chilean government has specifically asked Canada for a field hospital, a pontoon bridge, generators and telecommunications equipment. Bev Oda minsister of international cooperation announced on March 3, 2010, that Canada would give $2 million in aid to Chile.
- Republic of China (Taiwan): The Ministry of Foreign Affairs expressed condolences and offered assistance to ONEMI, the Chilean emergency and disaster agency.

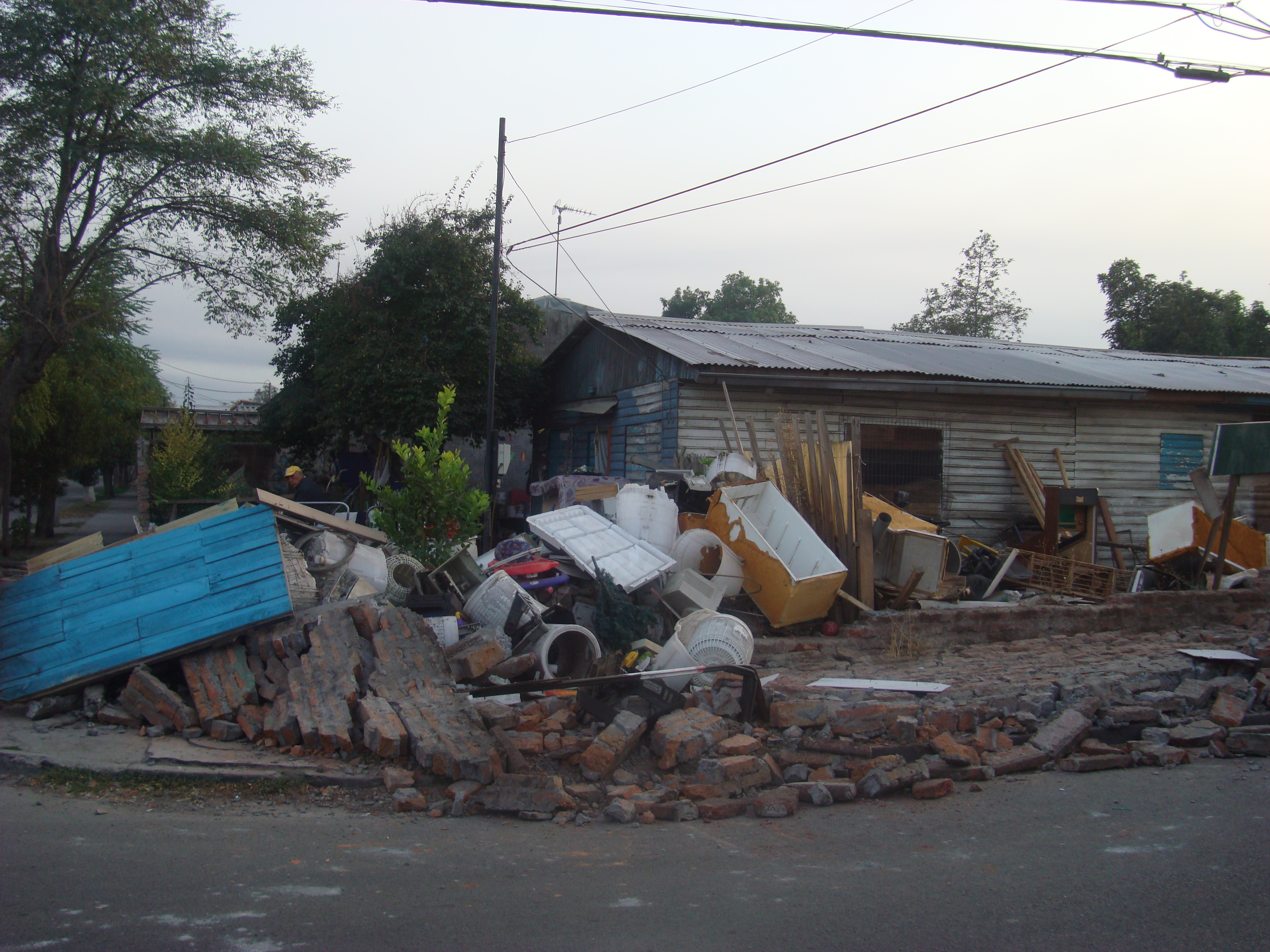
Structural damage caused by the earthquake.

- People's Republic of China: President Hu Jintao released a message of condolence to President Bachelet and offered emergency relief assistance to affected areas. He said, "On behalf of the Chinese government as well as in his own name, extended sincere condolences to Bachelet, the Chilean people and government as well as deep sympathies to the earthquake victims." On March 6, the Chinese government sent a plane to Santiago containing roughly 2 million U.S. dollars' worth of aid.
- Colombia: The Colombian Government expressed condolences and is ready to help this neighbour country by sending any help that the Government of Chile requests and also helping it through its embassy in Santiago.
- Costa Rica: The Costa Rican government communicated through an official note its solidarity to the victims of the earthquake. The National Emergencies Commission volunteered to send 3 structural engineers to help evaluate the conditions of the still-standing structures.
- Cuba: The Cuban government has sent a total of 36 doctors who have set up a temporary hospital in Rancagua, in the Cachapoal Province. Cuba has also donated about 12 tons of medicine and medical equipment to Chile. Several organs of the Cuban government as well as Ex-president Fidel Castro have also sent their condolences and have expressed solidarity with Chile.
- Dominican Republic: The president of the Dominican Republic Leonel Fernández spoke about the Chilean earthquake a few hours after the earthquake occurred, while presenting a previously scheduled speech about his tenure during the year 2009. He stated, "Our hearts and our prayers are with you" and expressed his solidarity with the Chilean people.
- Ecuador: The president of Ecuador, Rafael Correa, issued a statement of condolence saying, "You can count on us for any help we can give. A big hug for the Chilean people and beloved President Bachelet."
- France: French President Nicolas Sarkozy expressed his "deep emotion", while Foreign Minister Bernard Kouchner said Paris "in consultation with its European Union partners is ready to respond to the Chilean demands for assistance."
- Germany: German Foreign Minister Guido Westerwelle issued a statement saying that Germany was sending an expert team from the German Federal Agency for Technical Relief to Chile to find out how it could offer technical assistance.
- Haiti: Haiti, already devastated by the 2010 Haiti earthquake, sent condolences to the Chilean government. Haitian President René Préval went to the Chilean embassy and expressed condolence.
- Iceland: The president of Iceland sent president Michelle Bachelet condolences on behalf of the Icelandic people. The president hoped that the unity of Chileans and the international community would help relieve from the devastation that followed the earthquake.
- India: NBD reports " Indian Prime Minister Manmohan Singh today condoled the loss of lives in the earthquake in Chile and pledged USD five million support for relief and rehabilitation work there." "On behalf of the Government and people of India, I would like to express deep sympathy and condolences to the people of Chile on the great tragedy. Our thoughts and prayers are with the bereaved families", the Prime Minister said in a letter to Chilean President Michelle Bachelet.
- Israel: The Israeli government issued a statement saying that "Israel stands by the side of the government and the people of Chile, and expresses its solidarity with them in the face of the devastating earthquake that has befallen their country. Israel wishes to send its condolences to the bereaved families and to express its support to all the citizens of Chile in this time of trial." The government has offered medical and engineering aid and is awaiting a response from the Chilean government.
- Japan Prime Minister Yukio Hatoyama ordered preparation for relief and support activities.
- Jordan: Abdullah II bin al-Hussein, the current king of the Kingdom of Jordan, expressed his deepest sympathies over the loss of life caused by the earthquake via a telegram sent to Chilean President Michelle Bachelet.
- Kosovo: President Fatmir Sejdiu sent a message of condolence to President Bachelet and President-elect Piñera offering "...the deepest sympathies of the people and the institutions of the Republic of Kosovo."
- Kuwait: His Highness the Amir Sheikh Sabah Al-Ahmad Al-Jaber Al-Sabah sent a cable President Michelle Bachelet Jeria expressing sincere condolences, wished the injured a swift recovery and that Chilean officials would be able to overcome the impact of this natural disaster. His Highness the Deputy Amir and Crown Prince Sheikh Nawaf Al-Ahmad Al-Jaber Al-Sabah also sent a cable of condolences to the Chilean president. His Highness the Prime Minister Sheikh Nawaf Al-Ahmad Al-Jaber Al-Sabah did the same.
- Malaysia: Malaysia's foreign ministry conveyed Malaysia's condolences and deep sympathy to the victims of the massive earthquake that hit Chile.
- Mexico: The government of Mexico sent its condolences to the Chilean people, and promised to offer aid.
- New Zealand: Prime Minister John Key said, "I am shocked by the devastation in Chile and would like to convey my sincere condolences to the people of Chile, President Michelle Bachelet and the Chilean Government. The New Zealand Government is prepared to provide assistance to Chile should this be requested."
- Pakistan: President Asif Ali Zardari released a message of condolence to the Chilean President concerning the earthquake saying that "We are deeply saddened by the loss of lives and damage to property caused by the severe earthquake that has hit your country", while Prime Minister Yousaf Raza Gillani ordered to begin the relief process and assured Chilean government of best support and cooperation of Pakistan.
- Palestine: The president of the Palestinian National Authority, Mahmoud Abbas, expressed a message of condolence saying that "We have made it clear once again that President Bachelet of Chile and Palestinian peoples are found together in solidarity and fellowship. We know from our own history, the meaning of surviving tragedy and we are confident that Chile will overcome this sad time."
- Peru: President Alan García expressed his condolences for the loss of life and offered any service that the Chilean government and people would require from Peru. García further declared that on March 1, 2010, Peru would have a National day of mourning to show support for the victims of the earthquake in Chile. On March 2, 2010, Alan García and Foreign Affairs Minister José Antonio García Belaúnde visited Chile to meet with President Michelle Bachelet and Chile's President-elect Sebastián Piñera. His visit also brought three planeloads of relief supplies, including a makeshift field hospital, tents and medicines. He said that Peru will provide cash aid to earthquake-affected Peruvian citizens and will repatriate those who want to return to their home country.
- Portugal: The President of Portugal, Aníbal Cavaco Silva sent a letter to his Chilean counterpart to express his sincere condolences on behalf of himself and the Portuguese people.
- Qatar: The nation of Qatar sent a rescue team to Chile. On March 7, 2010, Members of the Internal Security Force (Lakhwiya) who left for quake-hit Chile on a humanitarian mission on Friday. The special force consists of doctors and other personnel who will help in the relief and rescue operations in the South American country. The team is also carrying with it 40 tonnes of aid materials including medicines, food packets and tents.
- Russia The Russian government sent a telegram of condolences.
- Serbia: President Boris Tadić sent his condolences to Chilean president Michelle Bachelet "The people of Serbia sincerely share the pain of the Chilean people for the numerous victims and heavy material damage".
- Singapore: Singapore donated $50,000 to quake hit Chile on March 3, 2010. Singapore announced on Wednesday a monetary donation of 50,000 U.S. dollars to Chile, which was rocked by a powerful earthquake early last Saturday. The Singaporean president Sellapan Ramanathan provided a statement saying that "On behalf of the people of Singapore, he extended his deepest condolences to the quake victims and their families, and wished those injured a speedy recovery from their trauma."
- South Africa: The South African government expressed its condolences to the people of Chile. A statement was issued saying that "We indeed say our thoughts and prayers go out to the Chilean people during this difficult time."
- South Korea: The South Korean government expressed its condolences in regards to the earthquake. A statement released by the government that was addressed to Chilean President Michelle Bachelet and President-elect Sebastián Piñera said that on behalf of South Korea, we express condolences to the bereaved families of those people who perished in the quake and to the Chilean people.
- Spain: The Spanish government in Madrid issued a statement saying that would provide all their available capabilities in the region to provide a coordinated response to this new disaster that has rocked a friendly and brother country.
- Sri Lanka: The government of Sri Lanka expressed its sincere condolences to the president and public of Chile in the wake of the devastating earthquake. Furthermore, the Colombo Department of Meteorology assessed that there would be no risk of tsunami conditions in the vicinity, as a result of the threat that distant shores could be inundated within hours.
- Sweden: Sweden's Prime Minister Fredrik Reinfeldt said that "We have via the Swedish Civil Contingencies Agency (MSB), said that we will contribute personnel...we are following the developments and are prepared to assist Chile...It is important to follow how serious the consequences are. We have already heard that there is much devastation and many have died in Chile." Reinfeldt mentioned that there are strong bands between Sweden and Chile, as there are many people of Chilean origin living in Sweden. The Swedish government is also working with the Swedish International Development Cooperation Agency (SIDA). MSB has assessed the needs that Chile requires from the international community and will contribute the equipment and aid workers that Sweden has available, says the Swedish newspaper Svenska Dagbladet. "It is a match with the requests (from Chile) and with the contributions of other EU nations", said MSB's press-secretary Karin Wiklund. Save the Children Sweden has personal in Chile assessing the situation and how they can contribute, and will make contributions as soon as the areas of need are understood. "We are very thankful for the solidarity that Sweden shows", Chile's ambassador to Sweden, José Miguel Cruz is quoted as saying in Svenska Dagbladet. There are many thousands of Swedes with relatives in Chile, and the Swedish government is working to connect people to their relatives.
- Switzerland: The Swiss Federal Department of Foreign Affairs said on Saturday that it would send experts already based in South America to the scene. They were expected to arrive on Sunday and would determine once on the ground how best to help. Chile had not requested assistance. The Swiss embassy, located in one of the most heavily affected areas of Santiago, suffered heavy damage.
- Thailand: Abhisit Vejjajiva, the Prime Minister of Thailand expressed heartfelt condolences to Chileans, especially the families affected by the earthquake.
- Tunisia: The Tunisian president Zine El Abidine Ben Ali sent his condolences on the behalf of Tunisia to President Bachelet.
- Turkey: The Turkish Ministry of Foreign Affairs expressed profound sorrow over the loss of lives in the Chilean earthquake disaster.
- Ukraine: The Ukrainian Government, in a letter given to the Chilean consulate in Kyiv, expressed condolences with regard to the damage and the tragic loss of life caused by the earthquake.
- United Kingdom: The British Red Cross donated £50,000 to help the victims of Chile earthquake. Prime Minister Gordon Brown said in a press statement that Britain would do whatever it could to help after the earthquake in the centre of Chile. UK-based aid organisations including Oxfam, Christian Aid and Save the Children started collecting donations as emergency teams prepared to fly into the quake-affected area. Oxfam is today sending a team of water engineers and logisticians from Colombia and senior humanitarian staff from its centre in Mexico.

US President Barack Obama made a statement on the earthquake in Chile.

- United States: The State Department established a web-based Chile Earthquake Google Person Finder and set up an emergency phone line for seeking information about missing people in the quake-affected area. White House Press Secretary Robert Gibbs said in a press statement that "We are closely monitoring the situation, including the potential for a tsunami, and Our thoughts and prayers are with the people of Chile, and we stand ready to help in this hour of need." President Obama cautions Americans in Hawaii and Guam to pay attention to local officials. The U.S. Air Force delivers several C-130 cargo planes to help with aid and evacuations.
- Vatican City: "I pray for the victims and am spiritually close to the people tested by such a grave calamity; for these I implore from God relief from the suffering and courage in this adversity", said Pope Benedict XVI in St. Peter's Square.
- Venezuela: The Venezuelan government, through its foreign ministry, sent a message of solidarity to the victims of the earthquake and offered his collaboration.

== Intergovernmental organizations ==
- European Union: Kristalina Georgieva from Humanitarian Aid and Crisis Response of European Commissioner for International Cooperation released condolences message to the families of victims immediately and assured of best co-operation. Georgieva said she had immediately activated the commission's crisis monitoring unit and told its humanitarian aid experts "to undertake urgent needs assessments if required". The European Union pledged €3 million in immediate assistance as aid workers rushed to Chile.
- Organization of American States: Secretary General José Miguel Insulza, himself a native of Chile, promised "all the cooperation that the OAS can provide".
- United Nations: Secretary-General Ban Ki-moon expressed his condolences for the loss of life in the quake.
- World Bank: The president of the World Bank Group, Robert B. Zoellick issued a statement saying that the institution was ready to help the victims of Chile's massive earthquake as he expressed his condolences following the disaster that hit the center and south of the country.

== Charitable organizations ==
- The International Federation of Red Cross and Red Crescent Societies has released 300,000 Swiss francs (c. £140,420) from its Disaster Emergency Response Fund.
- Humanity First from Canada and USA is prepared a disaster relief team.
- UK-based Oxfam immediately sent a team of water engineers and logistics experts, and also announced an emergency appeal for donations for the victims of the earthquake.
- UK-based Save the Children made an appeal for donations.
- UK-based Christian Aid made an appeal for donations.
- (International Committee of the Red Cross) US-based American Red Cross pledged $450,000 from its International Response Fund.
- Chilean NGO Un Techo para Chile (see TECHO) constructed 23,886 transitional houses for families affected by the earthquake.

== Commercial organizations ==
- US-based Wal-Mart Stores, Inc. announced an initial commitment of $1 million to go toward emergency relief efforts throughout Chile.
- Scotiabank announced $250,000 in aid for Chile, and a relief fund would be set up through its bank branches in Canada.
- Mining concern Anglo American plc announced $10 million in aid for emergency water and power, and reconstruction of homes and schools.
- Hyundai/Kia announced $200,000 in aid for Chile.

== Social media ==
- Twitter users following #Chile and #tsunami directed each other to various media and government sites (as well as the usual rumors and folklore).

== Timeline of relief efforts after the 2010 Chile earthquake ==
The timeline of relief efforts after the 2010 Chile earthquake of February 27, 2010 involves the sequence of events in the days following a highly destructive 8.8 M_{w} earthquake with an epicenter deep underground, offshore, near Maule, Chile.

== Specialist incidents ==
Over 50 countries including Brazil, the People's Republic of China and Argentina gave aid to Chile after March 1, 2010.

=== Earthquake casualties and specialist aid given ===
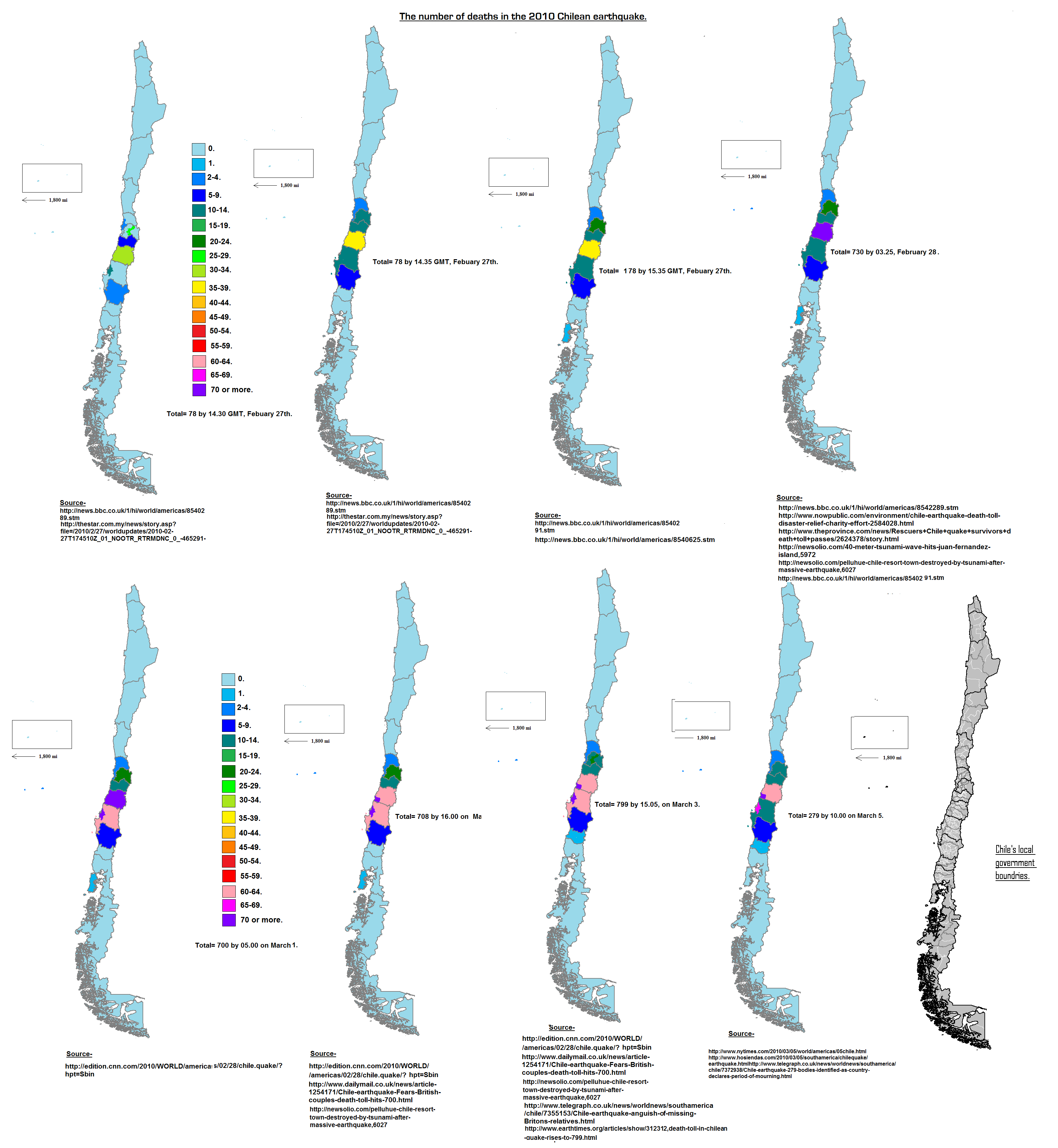
The regional death toll in the 2010 Chile earthquake from initial reports on February 27, 03.23 to 16.00 on March 1.

The death toll was initially put at 124 on February 27, then a total of 708 was declared at 16.00 on March 1 and included missing people. The number was updated by the government of Chile and decreased to 279 by 09.00 on March 4, as it was reevaluated to only confirm deceased victims of the event. As new victims were identified and confirmed by the government the number was raised, first becoming 452 by March 5, and 497 by March 8, being the last official report of the Ministry of Interior of Chile.

=== Tsunami casualties and specialist aid given ===
It reached Easter island in a few hours and finally reached Japan and New Zealand after about 1 day. Argentina has sent construction teams to Chiloe island to help reconstruct some of the washed away coastal buildings.

=== Looting and the police response ===
160 people were arrested by military police in Concepcion between March 1 and 2.

=== Church ceremonies ===
There will be a special mass in Valparaíso on March 3 to remember the town's dead.

== See also ==
- Timeline of relief efforts after the 2010 Chile earthquake
