= Xavier Isaac =

Officer of the Argentine Air Force

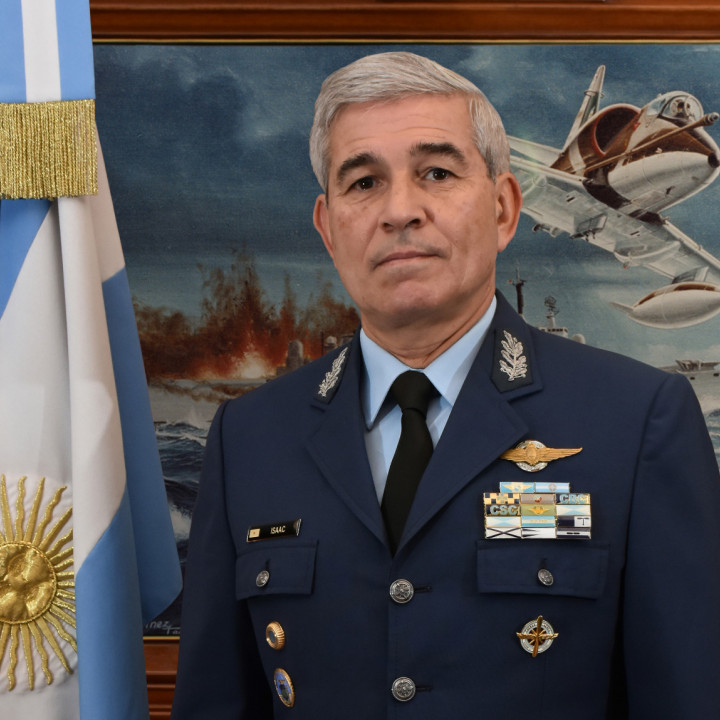

Chief of the Joint Chiefs of Staff of the Armed Forces of the Argentine Republic
- In office 2 January 2024 – 12 December 2025
- Preceded by: Juan Martín Paleo
- Succeeded by: Marcelo Dalle Nogare

Chief of the General Staff of the Argentine Air Force
- In office 28 February 2020 – 2 January 2024
- Preceded by: Enrique Amrein
- Succeeded by: Fernando Mengo

Personal details
- Born: 1 December 1962 (age 63) Buenos Aires, Argentina

Military service
- Allegiance: Argentina
- Branch/service: Argentine Air Force
- Years of service: 1981–present
- Rank: Brigadier general

Xavier Julián Isaac (born 1 December 1962) is an Argentine General that served as the Chief of the Joint Chiefs of Staff of the Armed Forces of the Argentine Republic. Prior to his appointment, he served as the Chief of the General Staff of the Argentine Air Force
