= Juan Martín Paleo =

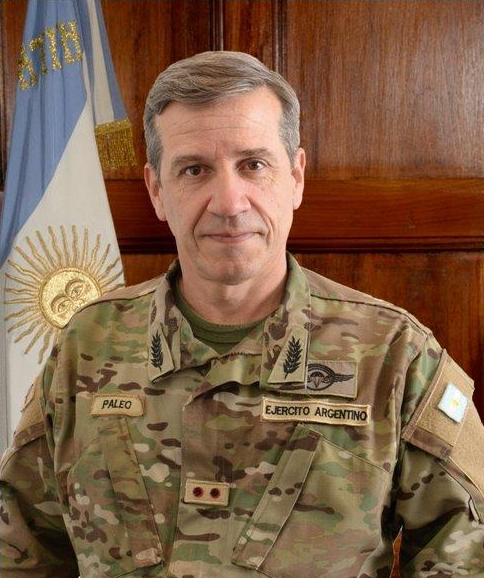

Chief of the Joint Chiefs of Staff of the Armed Forces of the Argentine Republic
- In office 27 February 2020 – 2 January 2024
- Preceded by: Bari del Valle Sosa
- Succeeded by: Xavier Isaac

Personal details
- Born: 4 April 1962 (age 64) Jujuy Province, Argentina

Military service
- Allegiance: Argentina
- Branch/service: Argentine Army
- Years of service: 1983–2024
- Rank: Lieutenant General

Juan Martín Paleo (born 4 April 1962) is a retired Argentine General who served as the Chief of the Joint Chiefs of Staff of the Armed Forces of the Argentine Republic. Prior to his appointment, he served as the commander of the Rapid Deployment Force of the Argentine Army.

== Background ==
He graduated from the Colegio Militar de la Nación in 1983 as an infantry officer, and has spent his career commanding infantry and special forces units. He obtained a degree in Strategy and Organization, and in Educational Sciences. He is also specialized in Driving and Strategic Management.

He commanded various units in the Argentine Army, such as the 602 Commando Company, the 601 Assault Helicopter Battalion, the Special Operations Forces Grouping, and the IV Airbone Brigade. He also served as the Military, Naval and Aeronautical Defense Attaché in China; became deputy director of the General Directorate of Organization and Doctrine; and became the Inspector General of the Army.

He also commanded the Rapid Deployment Force, where he was also in charge of overall security measures during the 2018 G20 Buenos Aires summit. On February 28, 2020, in a ceremony at the Libertador Building, he was appointed by President Alberto Fernández as the new Chief of the Joint Chiefs of Staff, replacing Lieutenant General Bari del Valle Sosa.

He was replaced by Xavier Isaac as the new Chief of the Joint Chiefs of Staff of the Armed Forces of the Argentine Republic on January 2, 2024, by Decree 120/2023.

== Awards ==
- Faith in the Cause Medal by the Colombian Army
