= Chief of the Joint Chiefs of Staff (Argentina) =

Professional head of the Argentine Armed Forces

- Jefe del Estado Mayor Conjunto de las Fuerzas Armadas

- Incumbent; Vice Admiral Marcelo Dalle Nogare since 12 December 2025
- Ministry of Defense
- Abbreviation: JEMCFFAA
- Member of: Joint Chiefs of Staff of the Armed Forces
- Reports to: Minister of Defense
- Formation: 29 January 1949
- First holder: Víctor Jaime Majó

The Chief of the Joint Chiefs of Staff of the Armed Forces (Spanish: El jefe del Estado Mayor Conjunto de las Fuerzas Armadas; JEMCFFAA) is the professional head of the Argentine Armed Forces. The JEMCFFAA is responsible for the administration and the operational control of the Argentine military. It is the highest rank military position in the country.

The current JEMCFFAA is Vice Admiral Marcelo Dalle Nogare. He was appointed by President Javier Milei on 12 December 2025.

== List ==
There have been a number of officers serving as the JEMCFFAA:

No.	Portrait	Name	Took office	Left office	Time in office	Defence branch
1	Víctor Jaime Majó [es]	Lieutenant General; Víctor Jaime Majó (1881–1959)	29 January 1949	1 October 1950	1 year, 245 days	Argentine Army
2	Aristóbulo Reyes	Brigadier Major; Aristóbulo Reyes	6 October 1950	22 December 1952	2 years, 77 days	Argentine Air Force
3	Carlos A. Garzoni [es]	Counter Admiral; Carlos A. Garzoni (1900–1982)	23 December 1952	31 December 1954	2 years, 8 days	Argentine Navy
4	Ángel Juan Manni [es]	Division General; Ángel Juan Manni (1900–1999)	1 January 1955	8 October 1955	280 days	Argentine Army
5	Benjamín Rattenbach [es]	Division General; Benjamín Rattenbach (1898–1984)	20 December 1955	17 October 1956	302 days	Argentine Army
6	Francisco A. Imaz [es]	Brigadier General; Francisco A. Imaz (1906–1993)	18 October 1956	6 December 1956	49 days	Argentine Army
7	Heriberto Ahrens [es]	Brigadier General; Heriberto Ahrens (1908–1994)	6 December 1956	29 May 1958	1 year, 174 days	Argentine Air Force
8	Vicente Baroja	Counter Admiral; Vicente Baroja	24 July 1958	23 July 1959	364 days	Argentine Navy
9	Juan Bautista Picca	Brigadier General; Juan Bautista Picca	1 August 1959	20 January 1963	3 years, 172 days	Argentine Army
10	Carlos Bertoglio	Brigadier Major; Carlos Bertoglio	21 January 1963	31 December 1965	2 years, 344 days	Argentine Air Force
11	Carlos Coda [es]	Admiral; Carlos Coda (1918–2004)	31 December 1965	11 December 1966	345 days	Argentine Navy
12	Jorge Alberto Boffi	Vice Admiral; Jorge Alberto Boffi	28 December 1966	22 December 1967	359 days	Argentine Navy
13	José Jaime Toscano	Division General; José Jaime Toscano	22 December 1967	13 November 1969	1 year, 326 days	Argentine Army
14	Ricardo Salas	Brigadier Major; Ricardo Salas	15 December 1969	16 December 1970	1 year, 1 day	Argentine Air Force
15	Ezequiel Martínez [es]	Brigadier Major; Ezequiel Martínez (1924–2019)	1 March 1971	1 October 1971	214 days	Argentine Air Force
16	Hermes Quijada	Counter Admiral; Hermes Quijada (1920–1973)	22 December 1971	3 November 1972	317 days	Argentine Navy
17	Osvaldo Cacciatore	Brigadier; Osvaldo Cacciatore (1924–2007)	3 November 1972	19 February 1973	108 days	Argentine Air Force
18	Carlos Álvarez [es]	Vice Admiral; Carlos Álvarez (1924–2003)	19 February 1973	12 June 1973	113 days	Argentine Navy
19	Pablo Arati	Counter Admiral; Pablo Arati	12 June 1973	7 December 1973	178 days	Argentine Navy
20	Luis Betti	Division General; Luis Betti	27 December 1973	29 December 1974	1 year, 2 days	Argentine Army
21	Ernesto Della Croce	Division General; Ernesto Della Croce	30 December 1974	21 May 1975	142 days	Argentine Army
22	Jorge Rafael Videla	Brigadier General; Jorge Rafael Videla (1925–2013)	4 July 1975	27 August 1975	54 days	Argentine Army
23	Eduardo Betti [es]	Brigadier General; Eduardo Betti	9 September 1975	18 January 1976	131 days	Argentine Army
24	Justo Guillermo Padilla [es]	Vice Admiral; Justo Guillermo Padilla (1924–2012)	19 January 1976	22 February 1977	1 year, 34 days	Argentine Navy
25	Julio Antonio Torti [es]	Counter Admiral; Julio Antonio Torti (1924–2016)	23 February 1977	15 December 1977	295 days	Argentine Navy
26	Pablo Osvaldo Apella [es]	Brigadier; Pablo Osvaldo Apella (1926–2019)	15 December 1977	24 January 1979	1 year, 40 days	Argentine Air Force
27	José María Romero [es]	Brigadier; José María Romero (1926–1993)	25 January 1979	31 December 1979	341 days	Argentine Air Force
28	Horacio Tomás Liendo	Division General; Horacio Tomás Liendo (1924–2007)	2 January 1980	29 March 1981	1 year, 86 days	Argentine Army
29	Llamil Reston	Division General; Llamil Reston (1926–2019)	30 March 1981	10 December 1981	255 days	Argentine Army
30	Leopoldo Suárez del Cerro [es]	Vice Admiral; Leopoldo Suárez del Cerro (1928–2003)	10 December 1981	9 September 1982	273 days	Argentine Navy
30	Carlos Büsser	Counter Admiral; Carlos Büsser (1928–2012)	20 September 1982	15 December 1983	1 year, 86 days	Argentine Navy
31	Julio Fernández Torres [es]	Lieutenant General; Julio Fernández Torres (1928–2014)	16 December 1983	7 March 1985	1 year, 81 days	Argentine Army
32	Teodoro Waldner	Brigadier General; Teodoro Waldner (1927–2014)	8 March 1985	11 July 1989	4 years, 125 days	Argentine Air Force
33	Emilio Osses [es]	Admiral; Emilio Osses (1933–2016)	12 July 1989	23 August 1992	3 years, 42 days	Argentine Navy
34	Andrés Antonietti [es]	Brigadier General; Andrés Antonietti (born 1933)	1 September 1992	30 November 1992	90 days	Argentine Air Force
35	Mario Cándido Díaz [es]	Lieutenant General; Mario Cándido Díaz (1933–2001)	30 November 1992	23 October 1996	3 years, 328 days	Argentine Army
36	Jorge Enrico [es]	Admiral; Jorge Enrico (born 1940)	23 October 1996	27 August 1997	308 days	Argentine Navy
37	Carlos María Zabala [es]	Lieutenant General; Carlos María Zabala (1939–2008)	27 August 1997	9 December 1999	2 years, 104 days	Argentine Army
38	Juan Carlos Mugnolo [es]	Lieutenant General; Juan Carlos Mugnolo (1939–2013)	9 December 1999	20 May 2003	3 years, 162 days	Argentine Army
39	Jorge Chevalier	Brigadier General; Jorge Chevalier (born 1946)	20 May 2003	26 June 2013	10 years, 37 days	Argentine Air Force
40	Luis María Carena [es]	Lieutenant General; Luis María Carena (1957–2024)	26 June 2013	26 January 2016	2 years, 214 days	Argentine Army
41	Bari del Valle Sosa [es]	Lieutenant General; Bari del Valle Sosa (born 1959)	26 January 2016	27 February 2020	4 years, 32 days	Argentine Army
42	Juan Martín Paleo	Lieutenant General; Juan Martín Paleo (born 1962)	27 February 2020	2 January 2024	3 years, 309 days	Argentine Army
43	Xavier Isaac	Brigadier General; Xavier Isaac (born 1962)	2 January 2024	12 December 2025	1 year, 344 days	Argentine Air Force
44	Marcelo Dalle Nogare [es]	Vice Admiral; Marcelo Dalle Nogare (born 1965)	12 December 2025	Incumbent	327 days	Argentine Navy

== See also ==
- Chief of the General Staff of the Argentine Army
- Chief of the General Staff of the Argentine Navy
- Chief of the General Staff of the Argentine Air Force
