= Timeline of relief efforts after the 2010 Chile earthquake =

The timeline of relief efforts after the 2010 Chile earthquake of 27 February 2010 involves the sequence of events in the days following a highly destructive 8.8 M_{w} earthquake with an epicentre just offshore of the Maule Region, see Maule, Chile.

== Timeline of relief efforts ==
=== 27 February ===
Chile asks that foreign aid be delayed until Chile can complete an initial survey of affected areas.

On Robinson Crusoe Island, 12-year-old Martina Maturana warned her neighbours and saved them from the tsunami.

Approximately one hour after the earthquake, teenagers in Dichato, Chile, lounging on the beach observed the sea roll out of the horseshoe shaped bay, and immediately ran through town to warn of an impending tsunami. This moved most of the town's population out of harm's way.

A fisherman from Constitucion with his skiff, rescued celebrants of the end of summer on an island on the Maule River, making two trips between the island and the riverbank, before being swamped and killed by the third tsunami wave.

The first report of a tsunami relayed to the central government in Santiago from the Juan Fernández Islands.

By early afternoon, Chilean government helicopters had started delivering relief supplies to Dichato.

A state of emergency was declared in Maule Region and Biobio Region.

=== 28 February ===
Chile sent in army forces to the affected areas to aid police to quell looting outbreaks. Curfews have been declared to aid in controlling the situation. The curfews were declared in Maule Region and Biobio Region.

The Médecins Sans Frontières exploratory team arrived in the Chilean capital of Santiago, from Argentina. It has started assessing needs.

=== 1 March ===
Chile formally requests international aid for earthquake relief efforts. Over 10,000 Chilean troops have been deployed into the affected area. Chile has requested of Canada to provide a surgical field hospital, generators, and telecom equipment. Chile has requested of Switzerland to provide first aid supplies, civil engineering experts, and rescue teams.

The Santiago Metro had resumed partial operation.

Los Angeles County Fire Department's California Task Force 2 (CA-TF2) started mobilizing for deployment to Chile for earthquake rescue efforts.

Cuba begins to organize a medical brigade of 27 personnel to send to Chile

Japan announces $3 million in grant aid for Chile. Also announced is 30 million yen in relief supplies from the Japan International Cooperation Agency, consisting of generators, water purifiers, tents and other supplies.

The European Union announces $4 million in aid for Chile.

China announces $1 million in aid for Chile.

Argentina announces it will deploy a field hospital with 54 health professionals, four power plants and three water treatment plants in government aid. As well, the Argentine business community will give 1/2 million litres of bottled water, and 1800 tonnes of non-perishable food in aid.

Brazil announces it will deploy a field hospital, medical equipment and mobile bridging equipment.

Russia announces it will ship two plane-loads full of warm clothing, basic necessities, tents, and generators.

Scotiabank announces $250,000 in aid for Chile, and a relief fund would be set up through its bank branches in Canada.

=== 2 March ===
79 survivors and 7 bodies were recovered from a collapsed 8 storey apartment building in Concepción. About 30% of power has been restored to Concepcion. Constitucion and Cauquenes will not be able to get power restored soon due to tsunami damage, on top of earthquake damage.

Over 14,000 Chilean troops have been deployed to the affected region, along with over 50 airplanes, also helicopters, and boats for relief efforts. 5000 emergency shelters were distributed by Chile.

The port of San Antonio has recovered to 60% operational, and the port of Valparaíso is operating at 90%. Initial assessment teams from the Chilean Exporters Association (ASOEX) have checked out damage to industry.

Cuban support arrives in Chile and sets up a temporary hospital in Rancagua

=== 3 March ===
Full operation returned to Arturo Merino Benítez International Airport, Santiago's airport.

Chilean troops locked down Concepcion to prevent looting.

The port of San Antonio was shut down by the earthquake, but had resumed operation at 80% capacity.

Firefighters in Ñuble Province are shipping river water in their trucks up into the hills to residents fearful of further tsunamis, who have abandoned their villages, and staying in makeshift camps.

UN's Office for the Coordination of Humanitarian Affairs (OCHA) has announced that the priority is food, power and water, for relief provisioning.

France is sending 1.3 tonnes of aid, and 7 seismologists.

=== 4 March ===
Large amounts of aid have started to arrive in Chile.

China has shipped $2 million in aid supplies, including, 700 tents, 10000 blankets, 100 portable power generators, 2 water purifiers.

Venezuela has sent rescue experts, 7.2 tons of food and water, 400 blankets.

The first Russian Il-76 cargo plane filled with relief supplies had arrived, carrying 28 tons of tents, diesel generators, pumps, blankets, food.

Aircrews and maintenance support personnel from Missouri Air National Guard's 139th Airlift Wing are being deployed to Santiago.

The European Union is sending an assistance mission to Chile. Included on the mission is a number of seismologists, with 27 seismological stations, Iridium satellite communications equipment, dialysis machine, water purifier, and a medical team.

Croatia donated 500,000 HRK (US$90,000) to Red Cross.

Hyundai/Kia announced $200,000 in aid for Chile.

Looting has largely been quelled. Firefighters in Talca had started inspecting buildings to see if they were habitable. A period of national mourning has been announced. Turismo Chile has reported that most tourist attractions survived undamaged through the quake. Tourist officials say that Chile is ready for business, and would like tourism to help the country recover.

A reconstruction estimate of 4 years and $30 billion has been released. An assessment has been made that stated that some coastal towns may be unrecoverable.

=== 5 March ===
Australia is preparing an aid flight for Chile, consisting of 150 tents, 1000 field beds, 50 generators.

India has pledged $5 million in aid for Chile.

Vietnam has pledged $150,000 in aid for Chile.

The United Nations has announced it will provide $10 million in aid.

$1 million from Walmart and $500,000 from Hewlett Packard in aid has been announced. Anglo American announced $10 million in aid for emergency water and power, and reconstruction of homes and schools.

Chile reports that 35 nations have responded to specific requests for aid issued by the Chilean government.

=== 6 March ===
Chile has launched a vaccination campaign against tetanus and hepatitis. Over a dozen Chilean military and civilian field hospitals have been deployed. The curfew period has been shortened. President Michelle Bachelet says that foreign soup kitchens will not be needed in Chile.

A US military field hospital is running in Angol, Chile. Two C-130 cargo aircraft and 50 airmen arrived in Chile to help in relief operations.

A Peruvian field hospital with 3 ORs and 28 beds is running in Concepción, Chile.

The second Russian plane-load of 28 tons of aid arrived, consisting of tents, diesel generators, blankets.

The first 70 tonnes of food from the World Food Programme has arrived. The food consists of high-energy biscuits, capable of feeding 35,000 children.

A plane carrying 2 million U.S. dollars' worth of relief supplies arrives from China in Santiago

Cuba sends additional medical personnel to complement its pre-existing relief force in Rancagua

=== 7 March ===
Chile has started a three-day period of mourning. Efforts have started to repair the fishing industry.

Geodynamicists, geophysicists, geodesists, seismologists, earthquake engineers are pouring into Chile. At least 25 new seismic stations are to be set up in Maule and Biobio regions. Previously fixed survey sites are being resurveyed to measure movements from the quake and its aftershocks.

Cuba has dispatched 9 more doctors and 12 more tons of aid and medical equipment, adding to its contribution of a medical brigade of 27 doctors and 9 staff that is running a temporary hospital in Rancagua.

Chile helps Chile (Chile ayuda a Chile) raises $30 billion pesos (US$60 million).

=== 8 March ===
The Chilean government has estimated that the cost to rebuild the damaged hospitals will be about $3.6 billion.

The Argentine Ministry of Defense announced that, after 9 flights, the Argentine Air Force Mobile Field Hospital at Curico is already operational

The Potash Corporation of Saskatchewan Inc. has donated $300,000.

Waste and recycling experts say that Constitucion's wreckage can be reused, and that proceeds from the sales of the rubble can help rebuilding efforts.

=== 9 March ===
Queensland, Australia has donated $500,000 to Chile.

A CMAT medical team was rerouted from Chile to Haiti after it was determined that there was a lesser need in Chile.

=== 10 March ===
An estimated $7 billion will be disbursed for insurance claims due to the earthquake.

The US Congress has passed a bill to better allow for donations for Chilean quake relief.

=== 14 March ===
More than 1600 people have been arrested for looting since the earthquake.

=== 16 March ===
An estimate that 70,000 emergency shelters are needed was released.

=== 19 March ===
The Chilean government unveiled a $110 million recovery plan for the central regions.

=== 20 March ===
A geomapping cruise has been announced by the US NSF, to map the zone ruptured by the quake, and compare it to previous surveys of the seafloor of the zone. The survey will use the ship Melville, already on site, when the quake struck, and last eight days.

=== 26 March ===
A charity tennis event, "Champions for Chile", has been announced for Saturday 3 April 2010. It would be held in Key Biscayne, Florida, and be held in conjunction with the ATP Miami Masters of Sunday 4 April 2010. Among the players that would play are Andy Roddick, Fernando González, Gustavo Kuerten and Jim Courier. It is similar to the Hit for Haiti events for 2010 Haiti earthquake relief. Proceeds would go to Hogar de Christo's Chilean earthquake relief.

=== 5 April ===
400,000 students are to return to class in the affected region on 12 April.

== See also ==
- 2010 Chile earthquake
