= Si6 =

Argentine research institute

Si6 Logo

Si6 is the codename of the Laboratorio de Investigación y Desarrollo en Seguridad Informática (Information Security Research and Development Laboratory) of the Argentine CITEFA (Instituto de Investigaciones Científicas y Técnicas de las Fuerzas Armadas, Armed Forces Scientific and Technical Research Institute).

SI6 belongs to the Information Security Division of CITEFA's Information Technology Department.

== History ==
The Si6 was created in January 2004 to analyze and provide the Argentine Ministry of Defense with scientific and technical assistance on subjects related to computer security. Si6 creation was somehow hard to accomplish, mainly because it's very difficult to admit new workers into Argentina's Government. Finally it was possible thanks to the support and effort a lot people made.

== Goal ==
Its mission is to create and direct information security R&D activities for both general purpose and national defense areas.

== Philosophy ==
Si6 believes that the sum of community efforts through applied research of innovative technologies is one of the most efficient ways to achieve technology knowledge. At the same time, Si6 think that improved education, specially on those areas, is a basic pillar of the society welfare.

All Si6 public projects are published under the GPL license. As part of this common knowledge exchange policy, CITEFA makes different agreements with public and private institutions in order to establish a national research and development network.

== Work ==
SI6 is currently working on intruder detection, intruder classification, intruder identification, honeypots, pattern analysis, biometric authentication, virtual private networks, firewalls, digital signature, penetration tests, etc.

== Location ==
Si6 is located at CITEFA headquarters, Buenos Aires.
