= Insignia and badges of the Armed Forces of the Argentine Republic =

The following are the currently used insignia emblems and badges of the Argentine Army.

== Branch Insignia ==
Branch insignia refers to emblems that may be worn on the uniform to denote membership in a particular area of expertise. Army branch insignia is separate from Army qualification badges in that qualification badges require completion of a training course or school, whereas branch insignia is issued to a service member upon assignment to a particular area of the Army.

The following are the currently used branch insignia emblems of the Argentine Army:

- Infantry
- Artillery
- Cavalry
- Communications
- Engineers

== Services ==
The following are the currently used service insignia emblems of the Argentine Army:

- Sanidad
- Military Justice
- Bandas
- Veterinaria
- Educación física
- Servicio Religioso

== Special Qualifications ==
The following are the currently used special qualifications (Especialidades) insignia emblems of the Argentine Army:

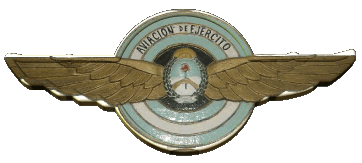
- Argentine Army Aviation Badge
- Military Aviator Badge
- Paratroopers Badge
- Commandos Badge
- Mountain Troops Badge
- Jungle Troops Badge
- Intelligence Badge
- Air Assault Badge
- Intendencia
- Arsenal
- Motorist Driver
- Motorised Infantry

== Argentine Air Force ==
- Fighter Pilot
- Transport Pilot
- Special Operations Group (Argentina) (Spanish: Grupo de Operaciones Especiales, GOE)

== Argentine Navy ==

=== Argentine Naval Aviation ===
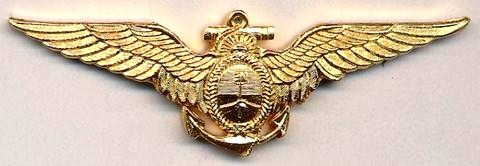

=== Argentine Marines ===
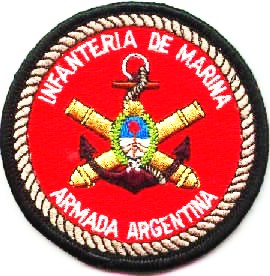
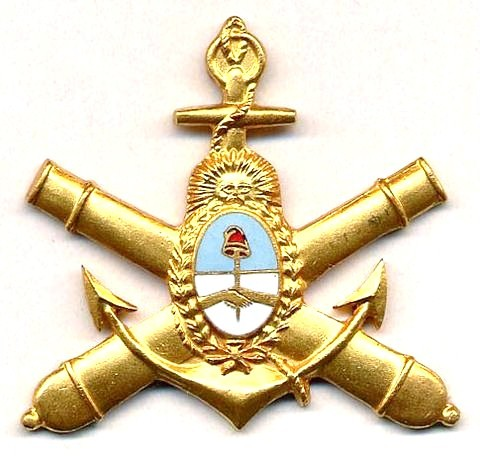

== See also ==
- List of military decorations
