= Armed Forces of the Argentine Republic =

Combined military forces of Argentina

- Fuerzas Armadas de la República Argentina
- Founded: 29 May 1810
- Current form: 9 September 1948
- Service branches: Argentine Army; Argentine Navy; Argentine Air Force; National Gendarmerie; Naval Prefecture (in case of war)

Leadership
- Commander-in-chief: President Javier Gerardo Milei
- Minister of Defense: Lieutenant General Carlos Alberto Presti
- Chief of the Joint General Staff: Admiral Marcelo Dalle Nogare

Expenditure
- Budget: $2.9 billion (2022)

Industry
- Domestic suppliers: Argentine defense industry
- Foreign suppliers: United States; France; Germany; Czech Republic; Spain; Brazil; Austria; Italy; Belgium; Sweden; Switzerland; Turkey; Japan Historical: Israel

Related articles
- History: Military history of Argentina; Warfare directory of Argentina; Wars involving Argentina; Battles involving Argentina
- Ranks: Military ranks of Argentina

The Armed Forces of the Argentine Republic (Spanish: Fuerzas Armadas de la República Argentina) are the combined armed forces of Argentina. It is controlled by the Commander-in-Chief (the President) and a civilian Minister of Defense. In addition to the Army, Navy and Air Force, there are two security forces, controlled by the Ministry of Security, which can be mobilized on occasion of an armed conflict: the National Gendarmerie, a gendarmerie used to guard borders and places of strategic importance; and the Naval Prefecture, a coast guard used to protect internal major rivers and maritime territory.

Traditionally, Argentina maintains close defense cooperation and military-supply relationships with the United States and to a lesser extent, with Israel, Canada, Germany, France, Spain, Belarus, Italy, and Russia.

As of 2024, the current Chief of the General Staff is the Air Force Brigadier General Xavier Isaac.

== History ==
The oldest forces of the Argentinian military are the Argentinian Army and the Argentinian Navy, both created in 1810, during the Argentine War of Independence, while the Argentinian Air Force was established in 1945. The Argentine military played a role in the institutional life of the country, during a series of coups d'état that took place in the 20th century.

=== 1955–1963 internal strife ===
After the Revolución Libertadora coup that deposed president Juan Domingo Perón in 1955, the armed forces split into opposing sectors named Azules y colorados ("Blues and Reds"). The fight would end in 1963 with military clashes and the defeat of the reds who were opposed to Perón.

=== 1965 Operacion 90 ===
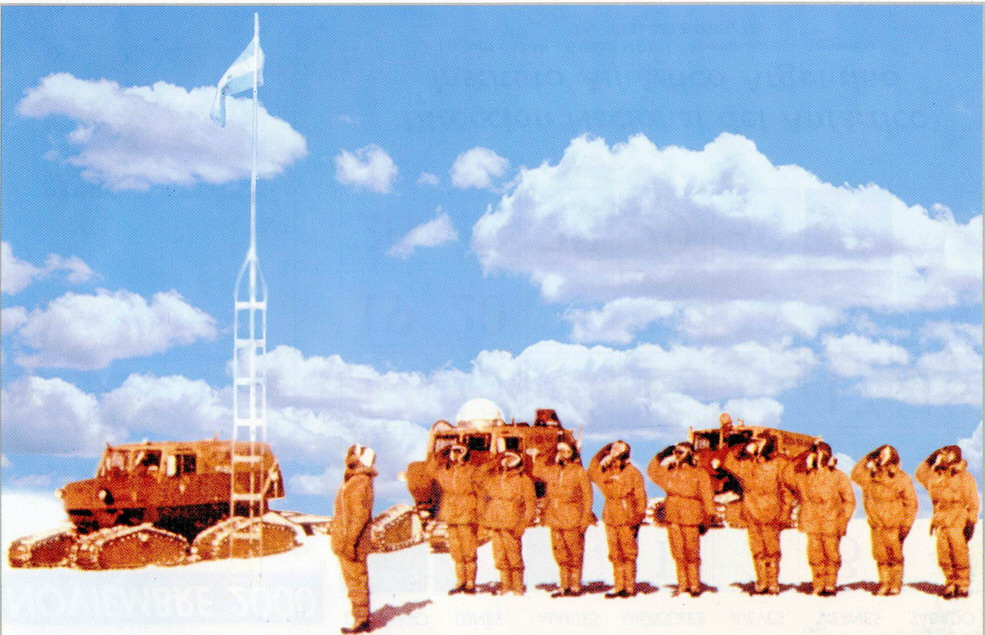
Soldiers saluting the flag at the South Pole.

In 1965, the Argentine military conducted a 10-man patrol on Antarctica called Operación 90 under then-Colonel Jorge E. Leal to perform scientific observations and promote Argentina's claim to a portion of the continent.

=== 1975 Counter-insurgency ===
In 1975 the armed forces started a massive operation in the Tucumán Province to crush the ERP (Ejército Revolucionario del Pueblo or People's Revolutionary Army) Guevarist guerrilla group which attempted to create a "revolutionary foco in this remote and mountainous province, in the north-west of Argentina."

=== National Reorganization Process ===
The last military dictatorship, the National Reorganization Process, lasted from 1976 to 1983. As Isabel Perón was unable to defeat the terrorist organizations of Montoneros and ERP, the military took power during the 1976 Argentine coup d'état and exterminated the violent communist guerrillas by random detentions, torture or death. The government of Cristina Fernández de Kirchner that sympathized with Perón, antagonized the Armed Forces with the justification of the past junta and limited the powers of the armed forced to avoid state terrorism of the past.

==== 1982 Falklands War ====
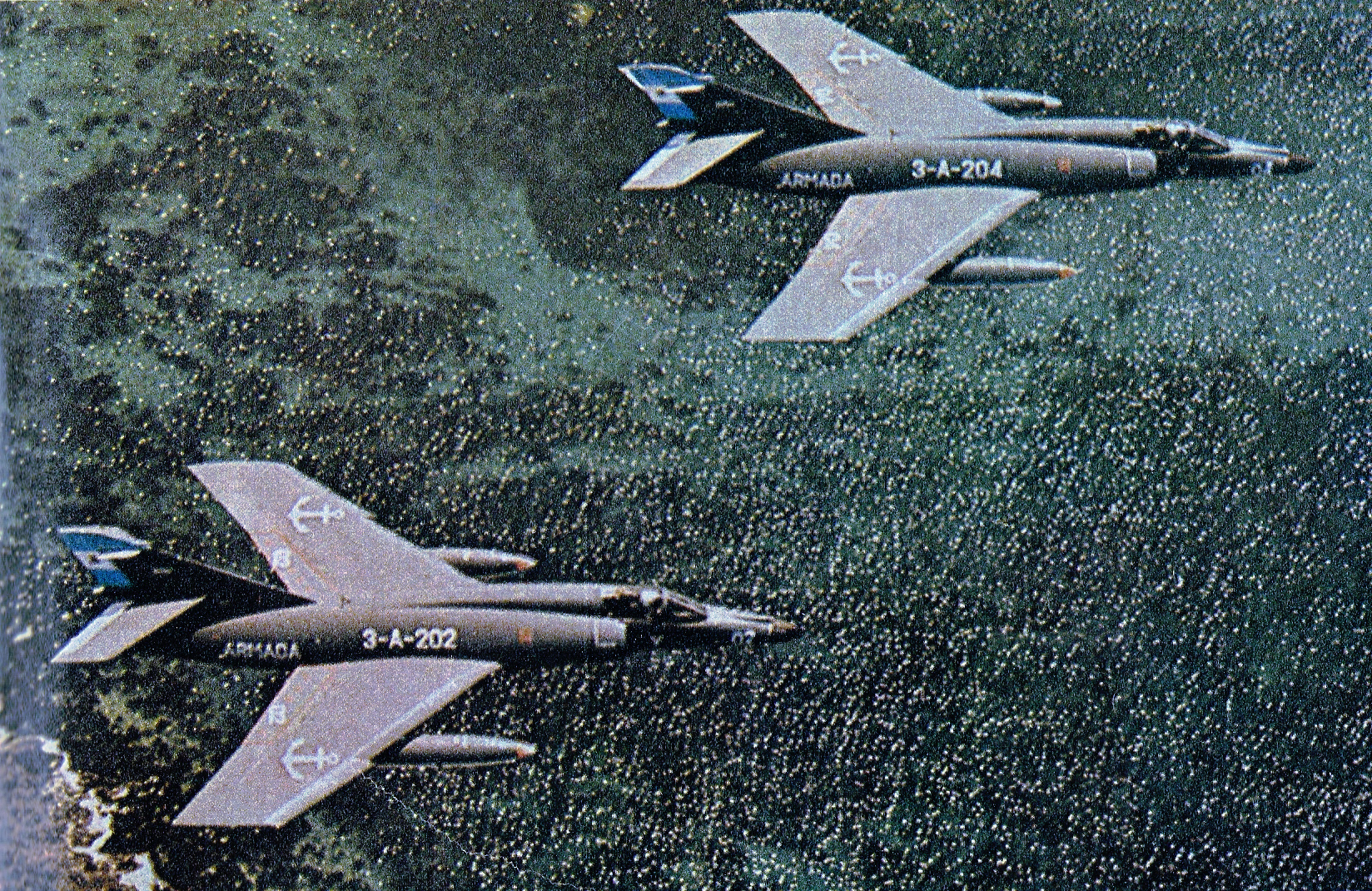
Super Étendard were used in the Falklands War.

On 2 April 1982, Argentine forces invaded the British overseas territory of the Falkland Islands, followed shortly afterwards by the invasion of South Georgia. Britain sent a task force to recover the islands. Argentina surrendered on 14 June. The political effect of the surrender led to protests against the dictatorship, which hastened its downfall.

=== 1983 transition to democracy ===
The democratic government of Raúl Alfonsín that took office in 1983 prosecuted the 1970s crimes and made the unprecedented (and only Latin American example) Trial of the Juntas and soon the Army was rocked by uprisings and internal infighting. Far-right sectors of the Army rebelled in the Carapintadas (painted faces) movement. To contain the rebellions, Alfonsín promoted the Full stop law and the Law of due obedience. The following president, Carlos Menem, gave the presidential pardon to the military found guilty in the Trial of the Juntas. It would not be until 1990, when the last military uprising in Argentine history was crushed, that the political conflict within the Army finally subsided.

In January 1989, during the subversive attack on La Tablada, the Army used white phosphorus in a violation of the Geneva Convention (according to a document presented by the human rights commission of the United Nations on January 12, 2001).

=== Gulf War and 1990s ===
Argentina was the only Latin American country to participate in the 1991 Gulf War sending a destroyer and a corvette in first term and a supply ship and another corvette later to participate on the United Nations blockade and sea control effort of the gulf. The success of "Operación Alfil" (English: "Operation Bishop") as it was known, with more than 700 interceptions and 25,000 nautical miles (46,000 km) sailed on the operations theatre helped to overcome the so-called "Malvinas syndrome".

From 1990 to 1992, the Baradero-class patrol boats were deployed under UN mandate ONUCA to the Gulf of Fonseca in Central America. In 1994, the three Drummond-class corvettes participated on Operation Uphold Democracy in Haiti.

Also, in the 1990s, Argentine Armed Forces began a close defense cooperation and friendship policy with neighbors Brazil and Chile, with emphasis on fulfillment of United Nations mandates.

The Argentine military have been reduced both in number and budget, but became more professional, especially after conscription was abolished by president Menem. The British embargo due to the Falklands War (Spanish: Guerra de las Malvinas) was officially eliminated and Argentina was granted Major Non-NATO ally status by United States President Bill Clinton.

=== Present ===
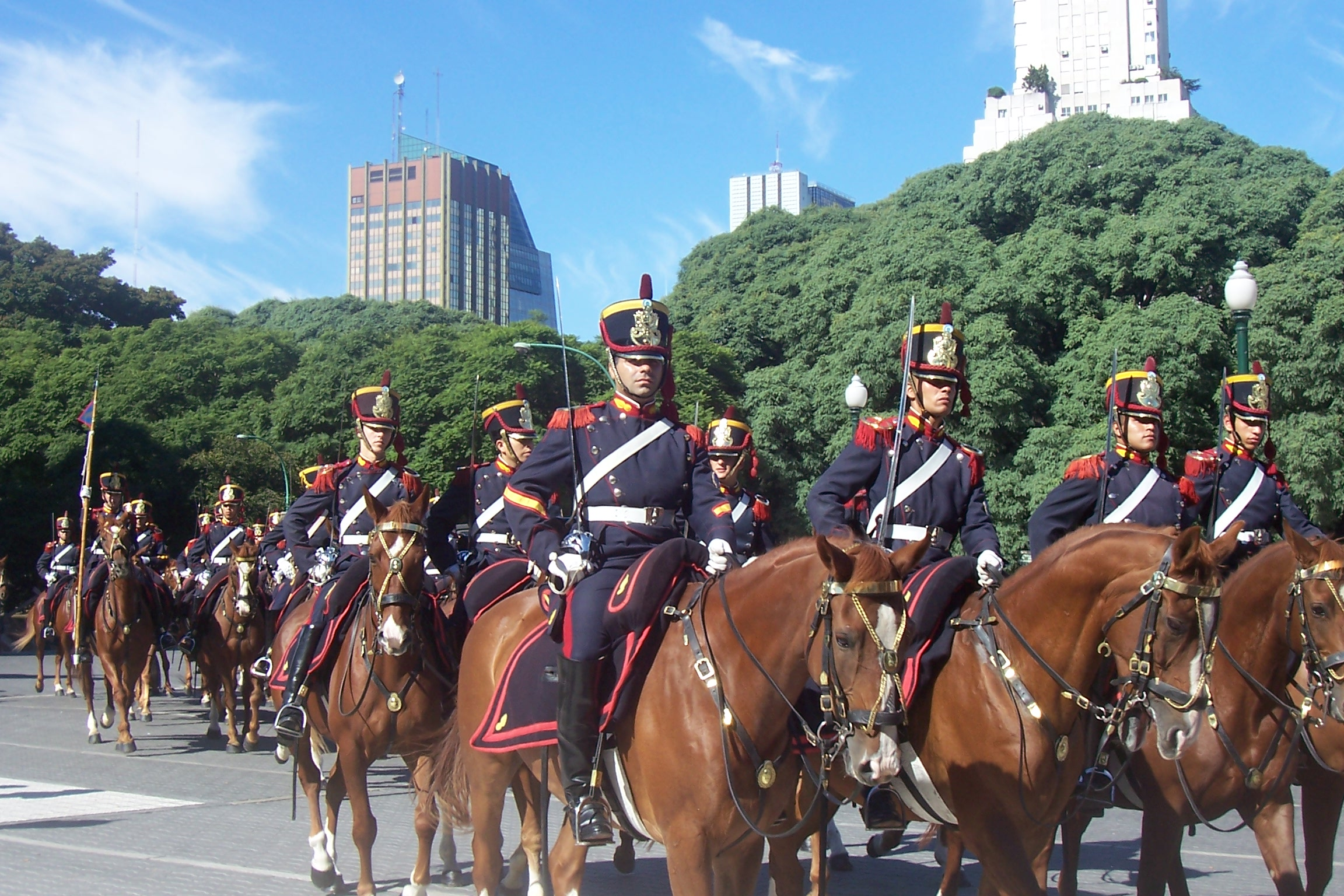
Granaderos, the cavalry unit that, among other feats, followed San Martín across the Andes in 1817 to liberate Chile and Peru

The modern Argentine Armed Forces are committed to international peacekeeping under United Nations mandates, humanitarian aid on emergencies relief and support the country's continuous presence at Antarctica.

Democratic governments since 1983 streamlined the military budget and did not approve any large scale equipment purchases. Argentina military spending is one of the lowest of South America and as of 2010, its 0.9% of GDP only exceeds Suriname Within the defence budget itself funding for training and even basic maintenance was significantly cut, a factor contributing to the accidental loss of the Argentine submarine San Juan in 2017. The result has been a steady erosion of Argentine military capabilities, with some arguing that Argentina had, by the end of the 2010s, ceased to be a capable military power.

The small-scale capability modernization that Argentina has attempted has been actively opposed by the United Kingdom. In 2019 the Argentine Air Force and government selected the Korean KAI FA-50 as its interim fighter to replace its aging Falklands-vintage aircraft. However, the deal was cancelled in early 2020 leaving the Air Force without a fighter replacement. British intervention was apparently a key factor in the cancellation with Britain stopping the export of the aircraft incorporating various British components. In October 2020, Korea Aerospace Industries (KAI) confirmed that since major components of the aircraft were supplied by the U.K., the aircraft could not be exported to Argentina. Britain similarly blocked the potential sale of Brazilian license-built Saab Gripen aircraft to Argentina given avionics that were of British origin.

In 2003, for the first time, the Argentine Navy (classified as a major non-NATO ally) interoperated with a United States Navy battlegroup when destroyer ARA Sarandí (D-13) joined the USS Enterprise Carrier Strike Group and Destroyer Squadron 18 as a part of Exercise Solid Step during their tour in the Mediterranean Sea.

On June 12, 2006, President Néstor Kirchner brought into force the Defense Law, which had been passed in 1988 as a means to modernize the doctrine of the armed forces and define their role. The law states that the armed forces will only be used against foreign aggression, and reduces the powers of the heads of the armed services, centralizing whole operational and acquisitions decisions under the authority of the Armed Forces Joint General Staff (Spanish: Estado Mayor Conjunto de las Fuerzas Armadas – EMC ) emphasizing Jointness.

In 2007, an agreement for cooperation in peace operations was signed with France.

A combined Argentinian-Chilean force for future United Nations Mandates was created. Named Cruz del Sur (English: Southern Cross), the new force began assembly in 2008 with its headquarters alternating between the two countries each year.

In 2009, UNASUR, the South American countries union, created the CDS ( Spanish: Consejo de Defensa Sudamericano (South American Defence council) in order to promote cooperation and transparency between their armed forces

As of 2011, they perform with Chile the PARACACH (Patrulla de Rescate Antártica Combinada Argentina-Chile, Argentine Chilean Antarctic combined search and rescue patrol) with support from the German Space Agency which provided satellite imagery

== Structure ==
The three branches of the Argentine Armed Forces are under the direct authority of the Defense Ministry, while the Argentine National Gendarmerie and the Argentine Naval Prefecture, as security forces, under the direct authority of the Ministry of Security.

Armed Forces (responsible to Defence Ministry)
English	Spanish	Acronym	Description	Official website
Ministry of Defense	Ministerio de Defensa	MINDEF	Federal ministry	https://web.archive.org/web/20161014182417/http://www.mindef.gov.ar/
Argentine Army (includes Intelligence Service)	Ejército Argentino	EA	Army	http://www.ejercito.mil.ar/
Argentine Navy (includes Intelligence Service)	Armada de la República Argentina	ARA	Navy	https://web.archive.org/web/20161015004044/http://www.ara.mil.ar/
Argentine Air Force (includes Intelligence Service)	Fuerza Aérea Argentina	FAA	Air force	https://web.archive.org/web/19971014225715/http://www.faa.mil.ar/

Security Forces (responsible to Ministry of Security)
English	Spanish	Acronym	Class	Official website
Ministry of Security	Ministerio de Seguridad	MINSEG	Federal ministry	https://web.archive.org/web/20180215011836/http://www.minseg.gob.ar/
Argentine National Gendarmerie (includes Scorpion Group)	Gendarmería Nacional Argentina	GNA	Gendarmerie	https://www.argentina.gob.ar/gendarmeria
Argentine Naval Prefecture (includes Albatros Group)	Prefectura Naval Argentina	PNA	Coast guard	https://web.archive.org/web/20160117010806/http://www.prefecturanaval.gov.ar/

Inter-service institutions
English	Spanish	Acronym	Class	Official website
Armed Forces Joint General Staff (includes Intelligence Service)	Estado Mayor Conjunto de las Fuerzas Armadas	EMCFA	Joint high command	https://web.archive.org/web/20161012085249/http://www.fuerzas-armadas.mil.ar/
National Directorate of Strategic Military Intelligence	Dirección Nacional de Inteligencia Estratégica Militar	DNIEM	Intelligence support agency	https://web.archive.org/web/20161014182417/http://www.mindef.gov.ar/
National Geographic Institute	Instituto Geográfico Nacional	IGN	Geographic support agency	http://www.ign.gov.ar/
Armed Forces Intelligence Institute	Instituto de Inteligencia de las Fuerzas Armadas	IIFA	Intelligence support agency	https://web.archive.org/web/20070517091519/http://www.iifa.mil.ar/
Armed Forces Scientific and Technical Research Centre (includes Information Security, Section 6)	Centro de Investigaciones Científicas y Técnicas de las Fuerzas Armadas	CITEFA	Research and development agency	http://www.citefa.gov.ar/
Argentine Joint Training Centre for Peace Operations	Centro Argentino de Entrenamiento Conjunto para Operaciones de Paz	CAECOPAZ	Specialized training centre	https://web.archive.org/web/20060501014635/http://www.fuerzas-armadas.mil.ar/caecopaz/index.htm

== International participation ==
Argentina was the only South American country to send warships and cargo planes in 1991 to the Gulf War under UN mandate and has remained involved in peacekeeping efforts in multiple locations like UNPROFOR in Croatia/Bosnia, Gulf of Fonseca, UNFICYP in Cyprus (where among Army and Marines troops the Air Force provided the UN Air contingent since 1994) and MINUSTAH in Haiti.

UNFICYP was also a precedent in the Latin American military as troops of Bolivia, Brazil, Chile, Paraguay, Peru and Uruguay are embedded in the Argentine contingent

Since 1999 and as of June 2006, Argentina is the only Latin American country to maintain troops in Kosovo during SFOR (and later EUFOR) operations where combat engineers of the Argentine Armed Forces are embedded in an Italian brigade.

In 2007, an Argentine contingent including helicopters, boats and water purification plants was sent to help Bolivia against their worst floods in decades. In 2010 the Armed Forces were also involved in Haiti and Chile humanitarian responses after their respective earthquakes.

Argentine military forces formed part of

- Haiti - UN MINUSTAH ^{video} ( Including the Mobile Field Hospital and helicopters )
- Cyprus - UN UNFICYP ( including ARGAIR helicopters )
- Serbia/Province Kosovo - NATO KFOR (CICKO) ^{pictorial}
- Serbia/Province Kosovo - UN UNMIK
- Belgium - NATO ICC-SHAPE
- Bosnia - NATO EUFOR

And as military observers in UNTSO, MINURSO, UNMIL, MONUC, UNMIS and UNOCI.

Argentina was also responsible for the White Helmets initiative.

== Gallery ==
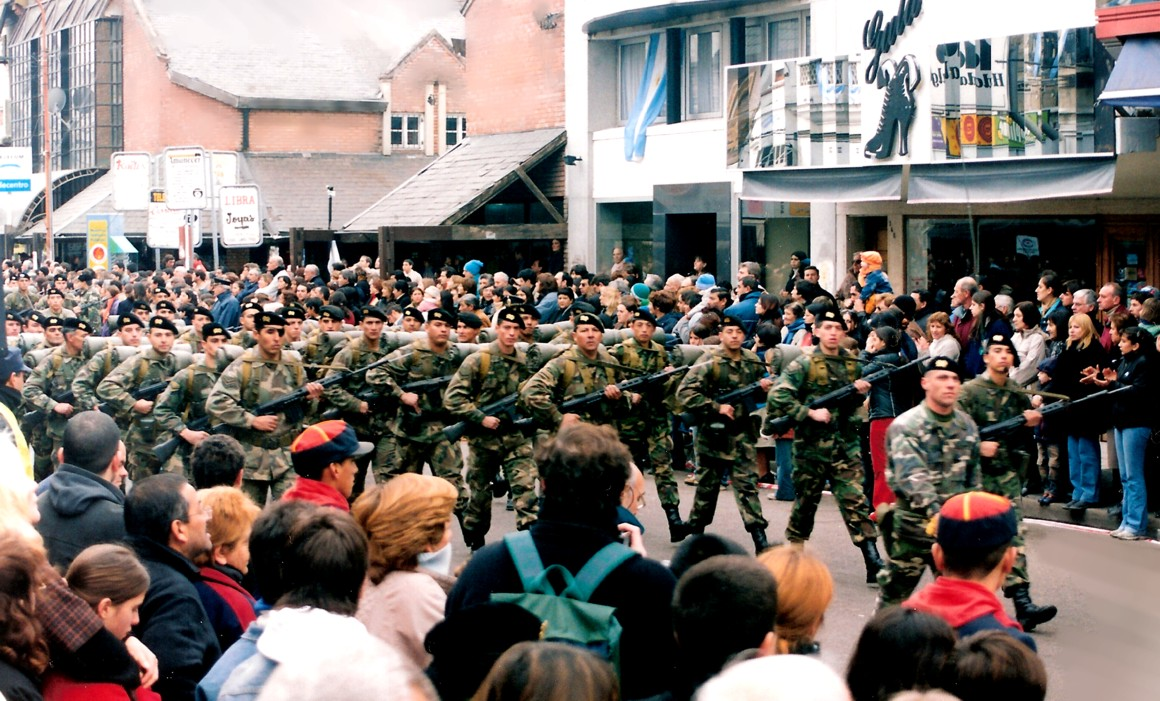
Independence Day Army parade, Junín, 2004

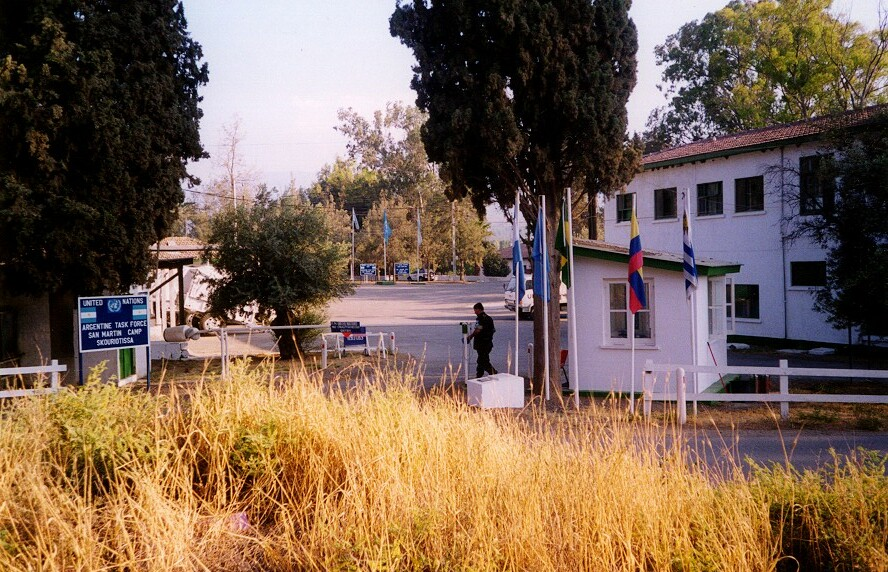
San Martin camp for UNFICYP in Cyprus

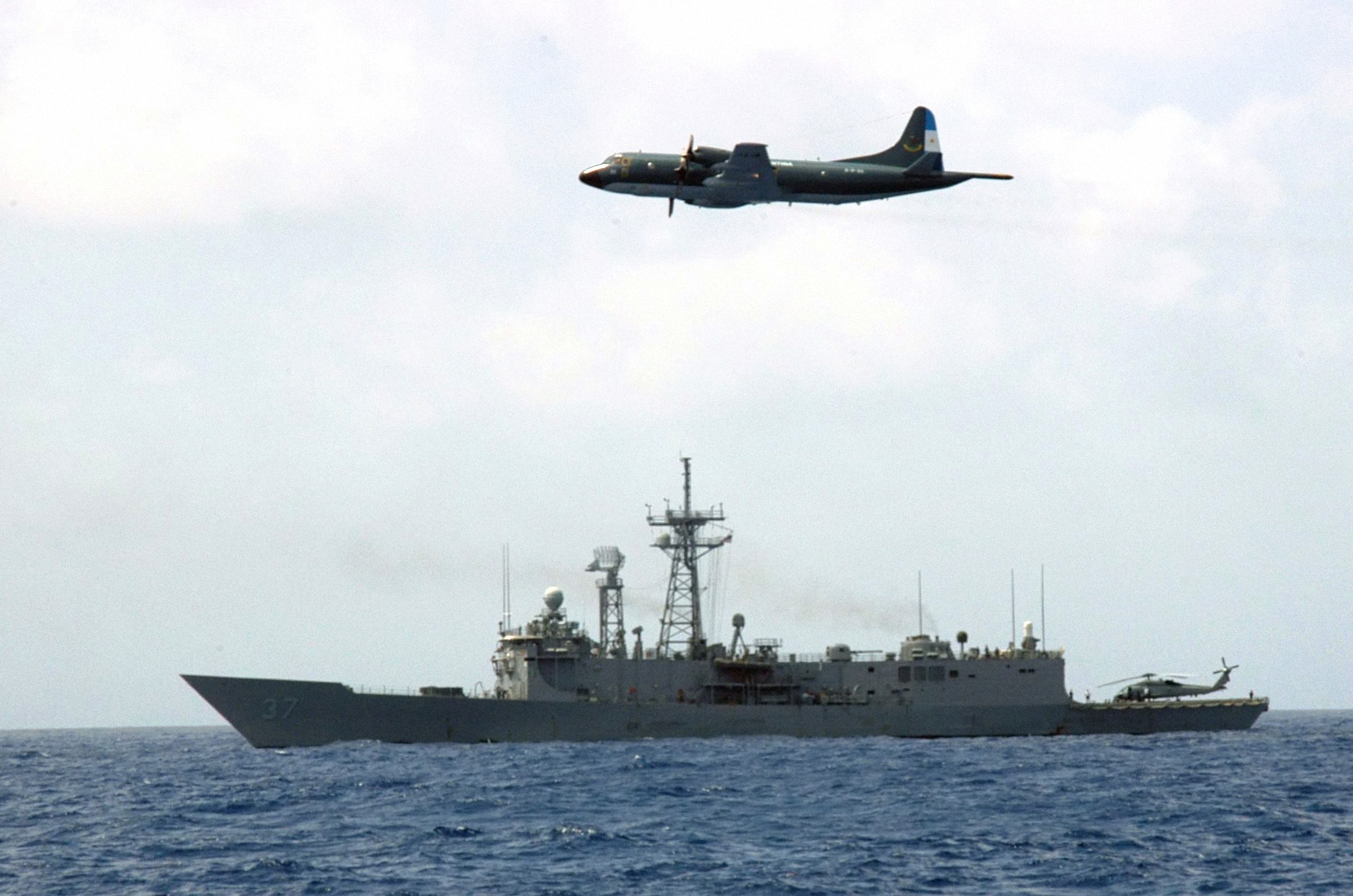
P-3B on joint operations in Panama

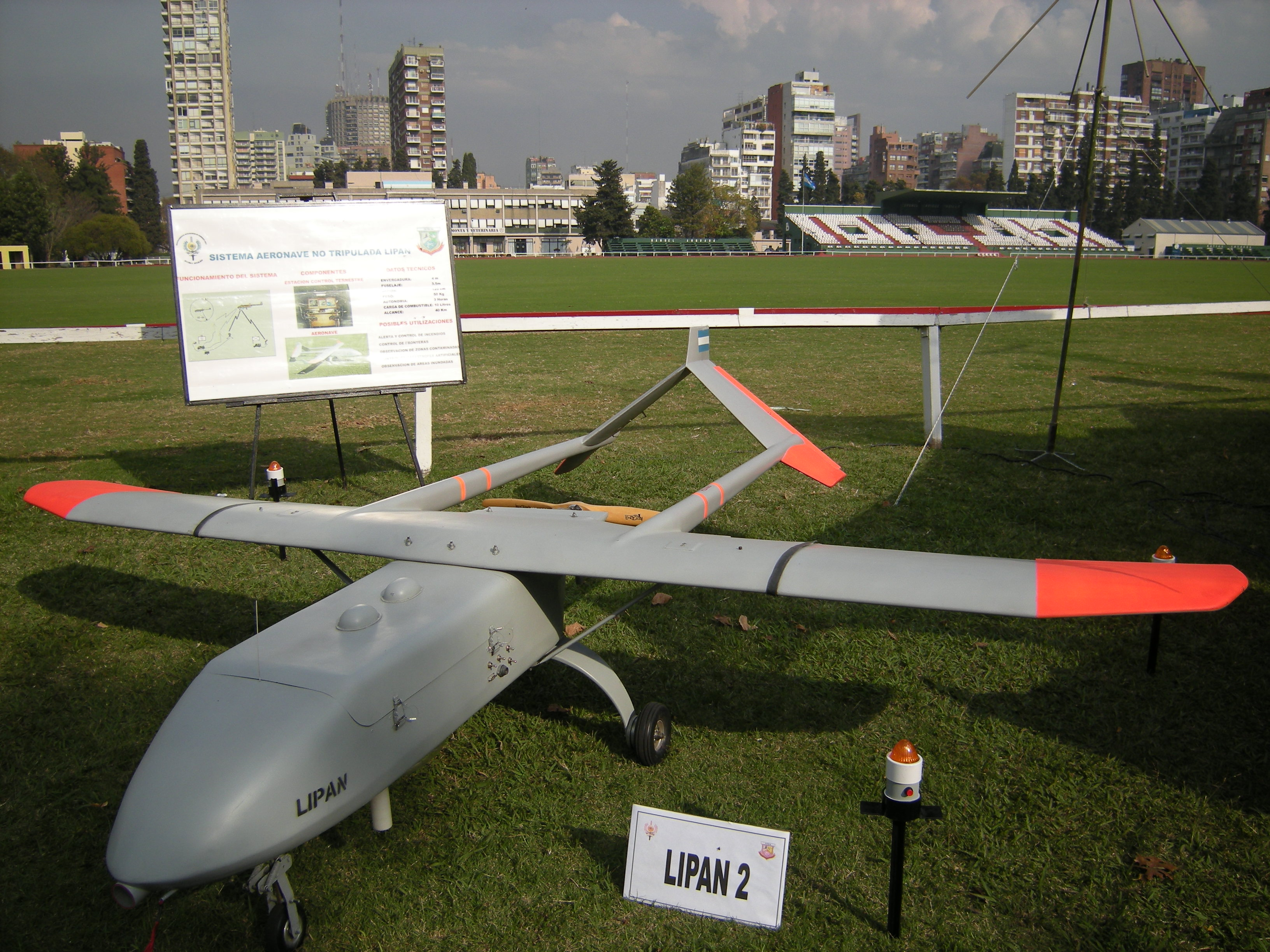
Research and Development: UAV Lipan

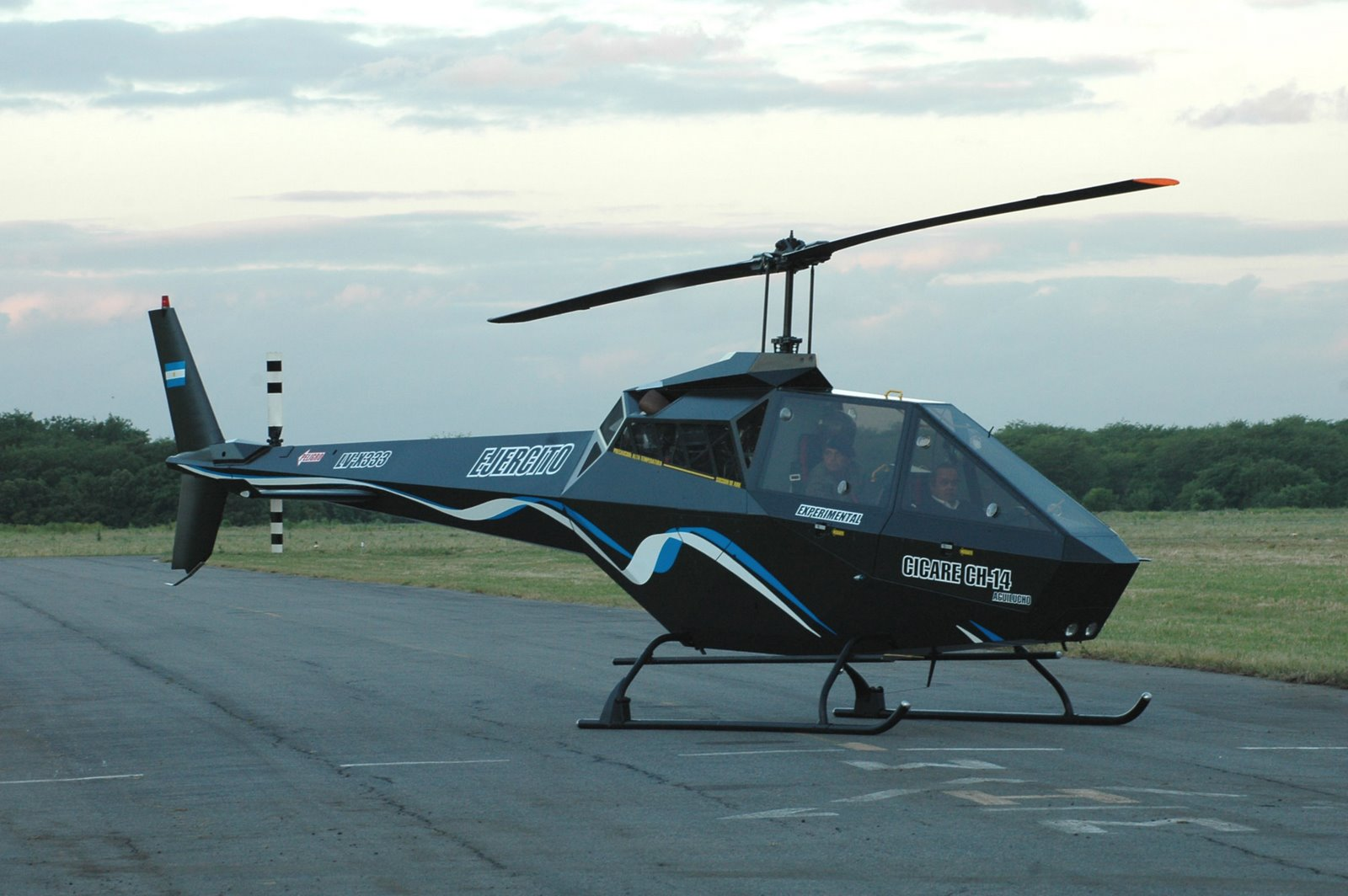
Development: CH-14 Aguilucho

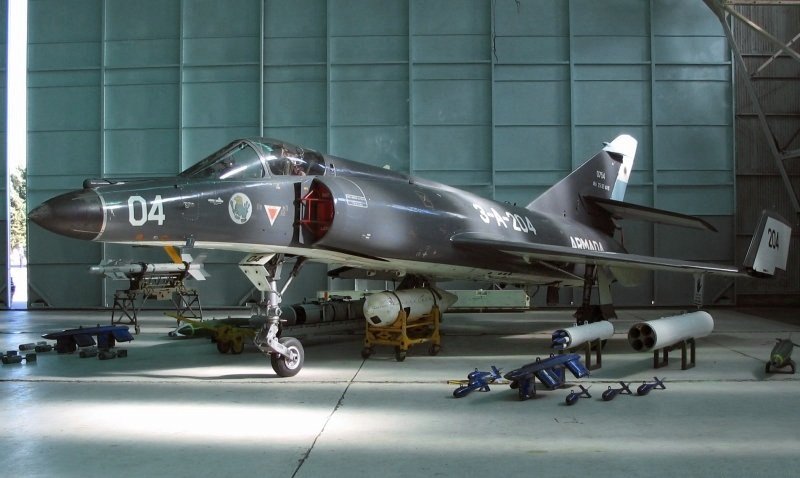
Super Étendard naval fighter

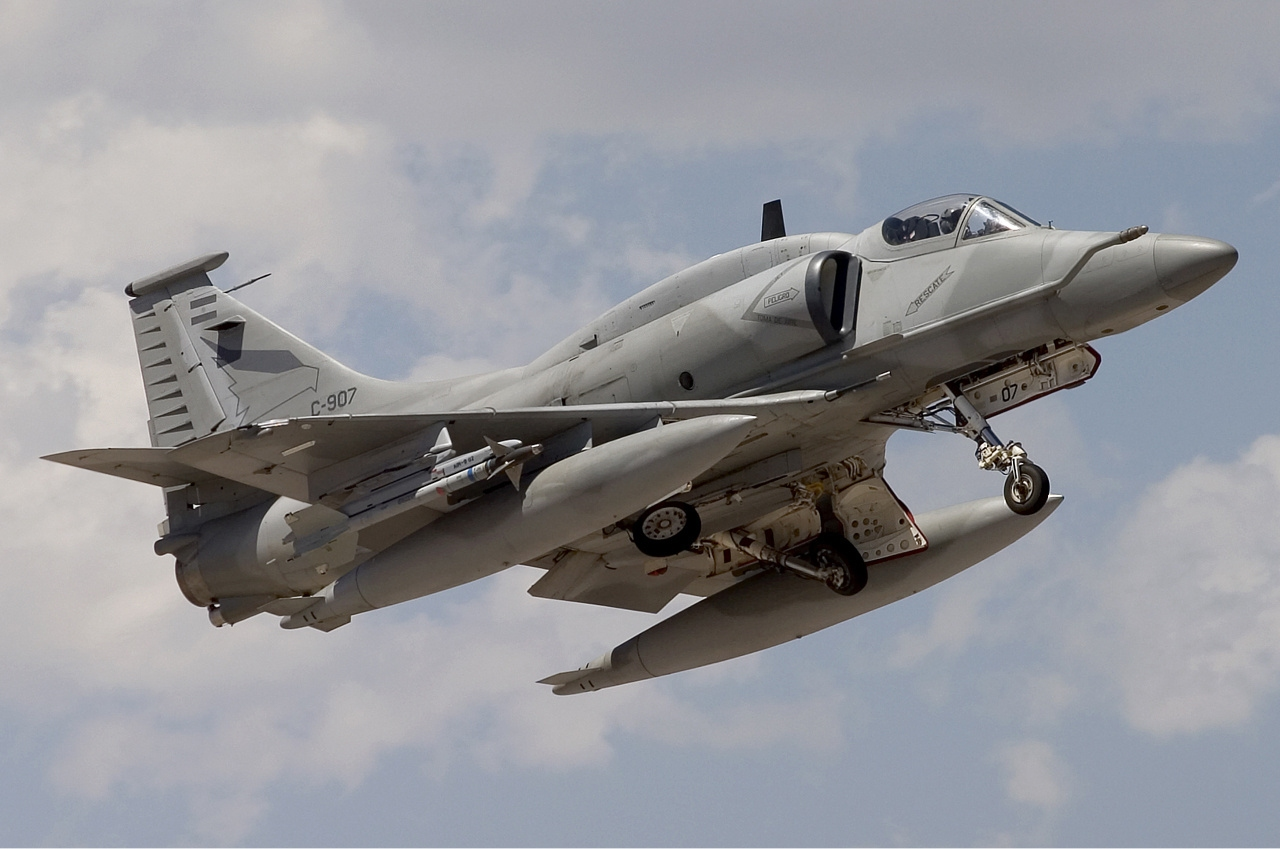
A-4AR strike-fighter

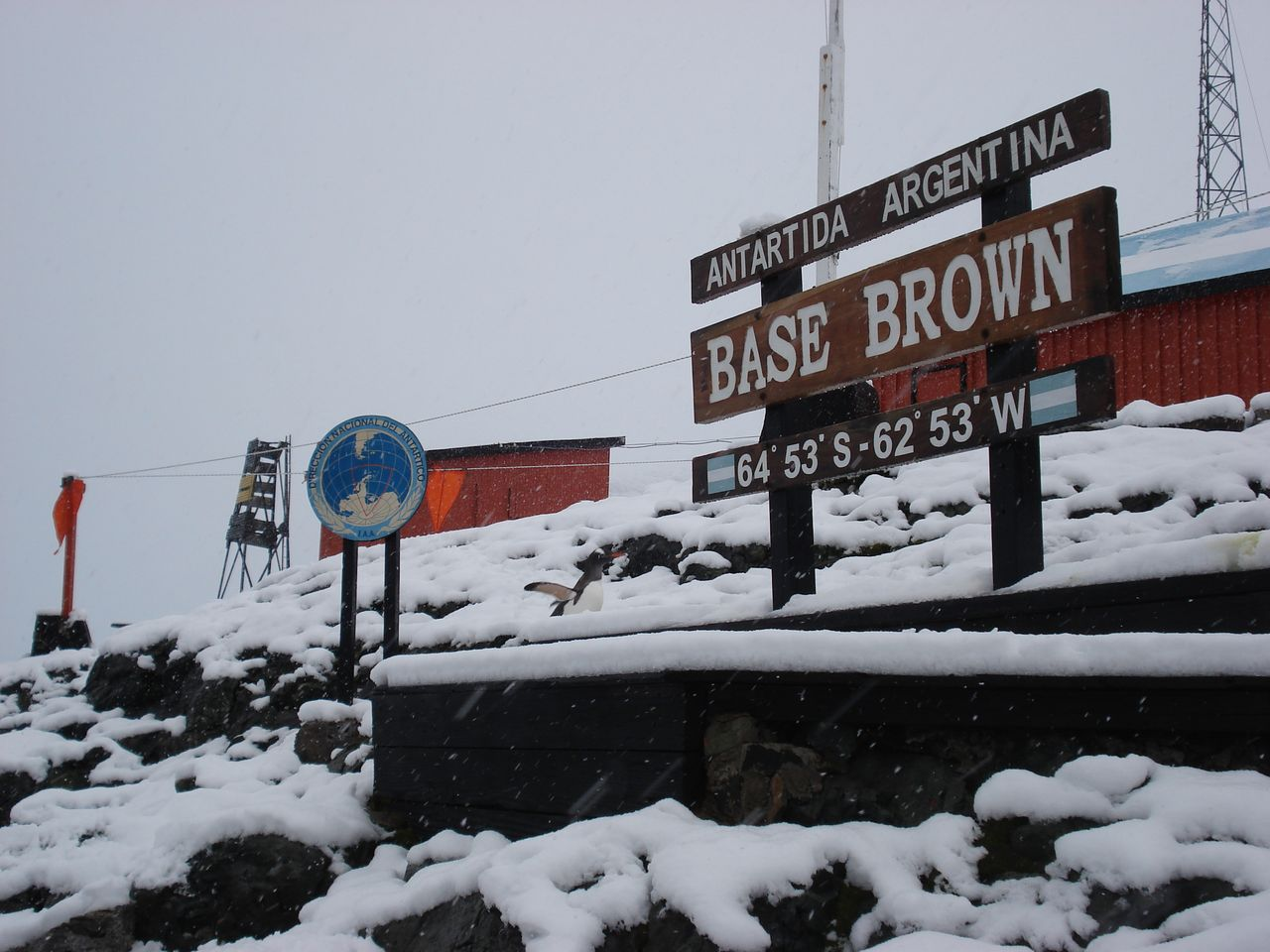
Argentine Antarctic presence

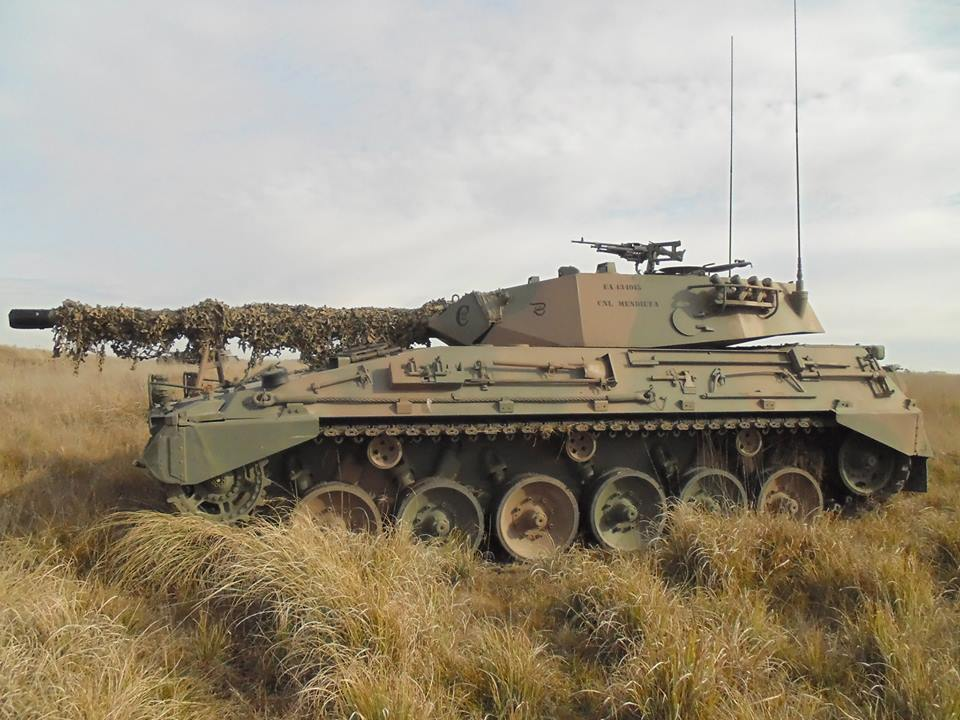
TAM medium tank

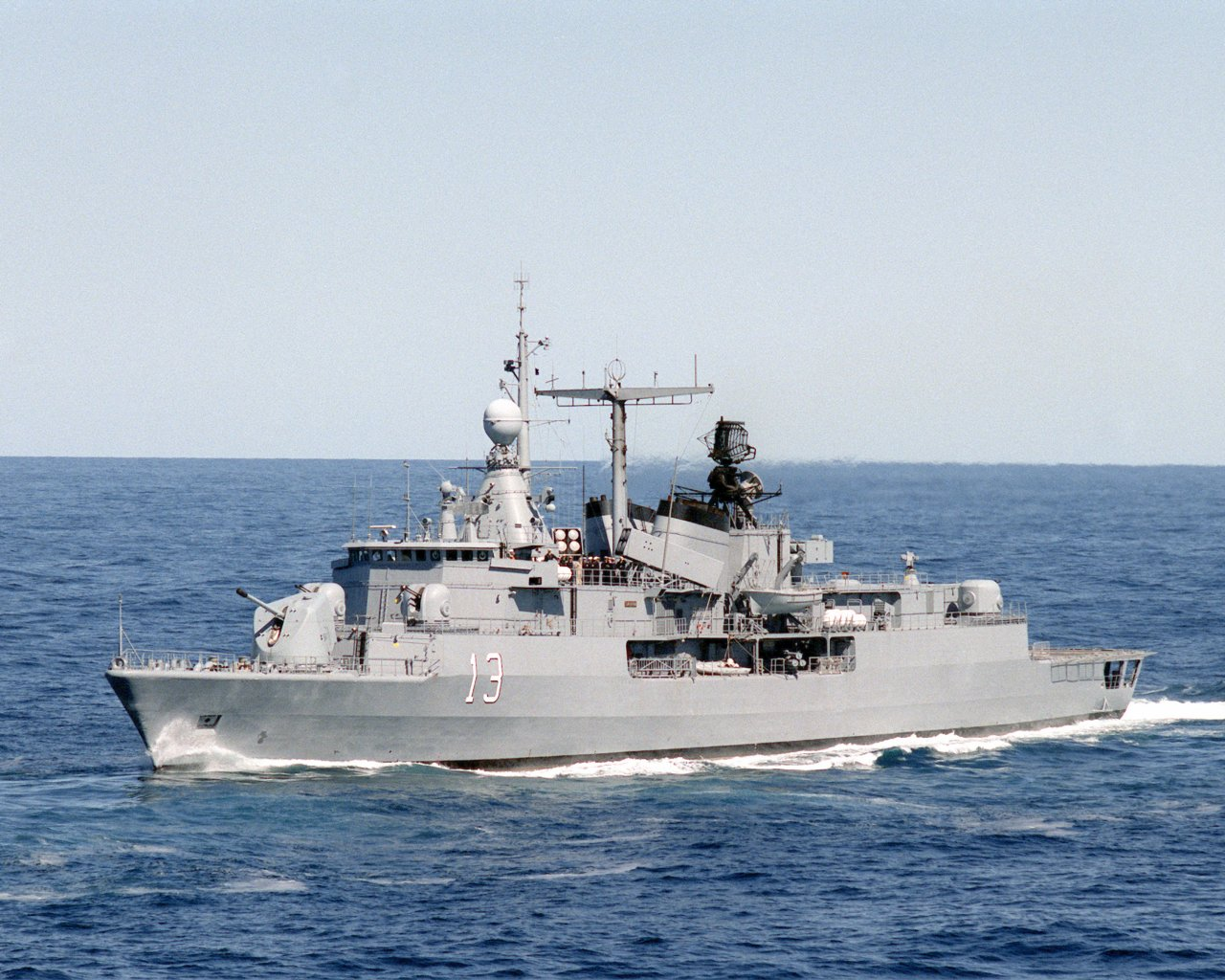
MEKO-360H2 class destroyer

== See also ==
- Argentine Air Force
- Argentine Army
  - Argentine Army Aviation
- Argentine Navy
  - Argentine Naval Aviation
- Insignia and badges of the Armed Forces of the Argentine Republic
- Military ranks of Argentina
- Argentine defense industry
- Argentina and weapons of mass destruction
- Foreign relations of Argentina
