= Military ranks of Argentina =

The Military ranks of Argentina are the military insignia used by the Armed Forces of the Argentine Republic.

== Commissioned officer ranks ==
The rank insignia of commissioned officers.

Rank group	General / flag officers				Senior officers			Junior officers
Argentine Army
Argentine Army	Teniente general	General de división	General de brigada	Coronel mayor	Coronel	Teniente coronel	Mayor	Capitán	Teniente primero	Teniente	Subteniente
Argentine Navy
Argentine Navy	Almirante	Vicealmirante	Contralmirante	Comodoro de marina	Capitán de navío	Capitán de fragata	Capitán de corbeta	Teniente de navío	Teniente de fragata	Teniente de corbeta	Guardiamarina
Argentine Air Force
Argentine Air Force	Brigadier general	Brigadier mayor	Brigadier	Comodoro mayor	Comodoro	Vicecomodoro	Mayor	Capitán	Primer teniente	Teniente	Alférez
Rank group	General / flag officers				Senior officers			Junior officers

== Other ranks ==
The rank insignia of non-commissioned officers and enlisted personnel.

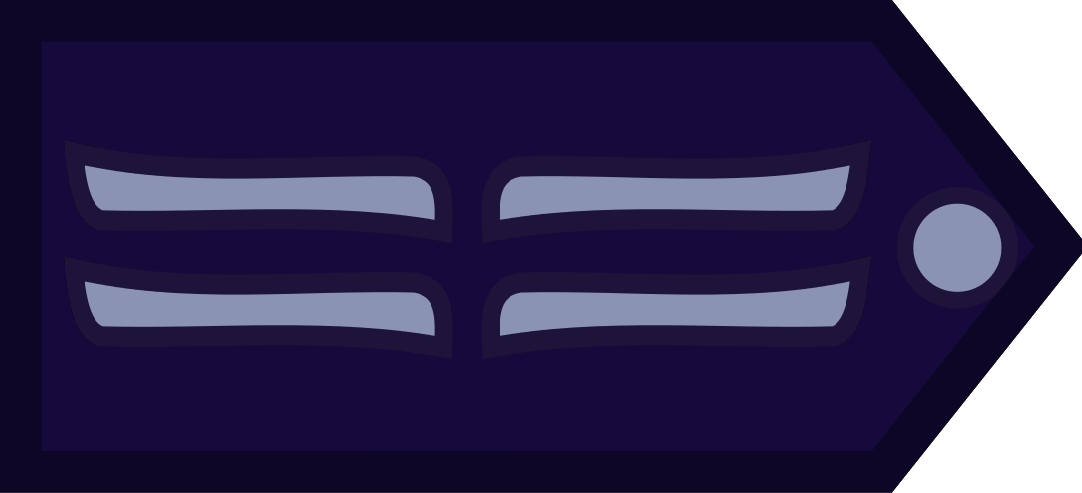
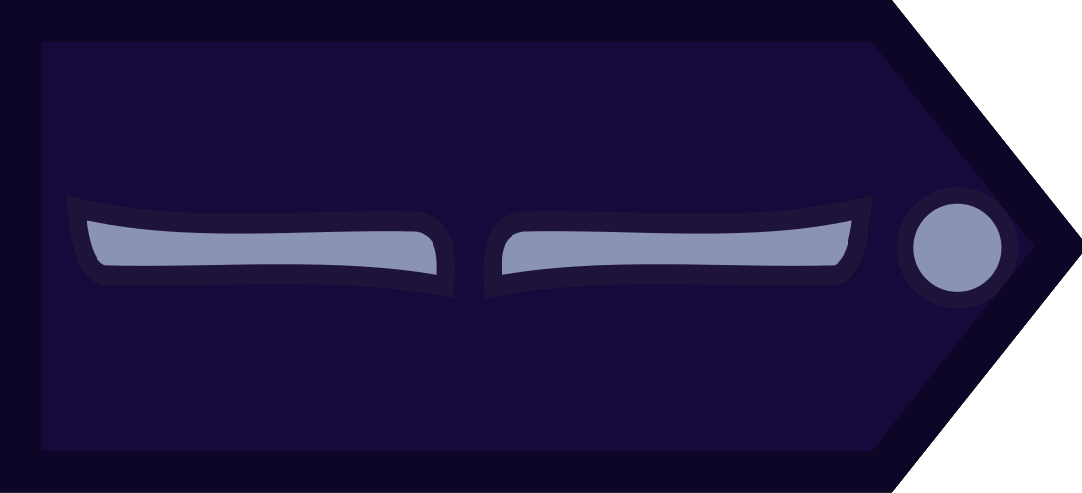
Rank group	Senior NCOs					Junior NCOs		Enlisted
Argentine Army
Argentine Army	Suboficial mayor	Suboficial principal	Sargento ayudante	Sargento primero	Sargento	Cabo primero	Cabo	Voluntario primero	Voluntario segundo	Soldado de segunda en comisión
Argentine Navy
Argentine Navy	Suboficial mayor	Suboficial principal	Suboficial primero	Suboficial segundo	Cabo principal	Cabo primero	Cabo segundo	Marinero primero	Marinero segundo
Argentine Air Force
Argentine Air Force	Suboficial mayor	Suboficial principal	Suboficial ayudante	Suboficial auxiliar	Cabo principal	Cabo primero	Cabo	Voluntario primero	Voluntario segundo
Rank group	Senior NCOs					Junior NCOs		Enlisted

== National gendarmerie ==
Officers

Rank group	General / flag officers			Senior officers			Junior officers
Argentine National Gendarmerie
Argentine National Gendarmerie	Director Nacional	Subdirector Nacional	Comandante General	Comandante Mayor	Comandante Principal	Comandante	Segundo Comandante	Primer Alférez	Alférez	Subalferez

Other ranks

Rank group	Senior NCOs					Junior NCOs		Enlisted
Argentine National Gendarmerie								No insignia
Argentine National Gendarmerie	Suboficial Mayor	Suboficial Principal	Sargento Ayudante	Sargento Primero	Sargento	Cabo Primero	Cabo	Gendarme

== Naval prefecture ==
Officers

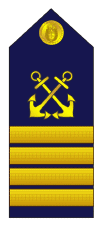
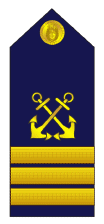
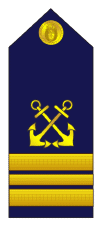
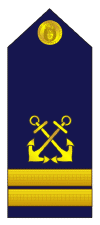
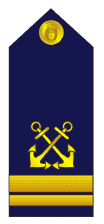
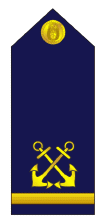
Rank group	General / flag officers			Senior officers			Junior officers
Argentine Naval Prefecture
Argentine Naval Prefecture	Prefecto General (Prefecto Nacional Naval)	Prefecto General (Subprefecto Nacional Naval)	Prefecto General	Prefecto Mayor	Prefecto Principal	Prefecto	Subprefecto	Oficial Principal	Oficial Auxiliar	Oficial Ayudante
Equivalent U.S. Coast Guard Rank	Vice admiral	Rear admiral	Rear admiral (lower half)	Captain	Commander	Lieutenant Commander	Lieutenant	Lieutenant (Junior Grade)	Ensign	No equivalent

Other ranks

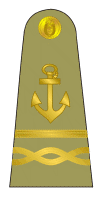
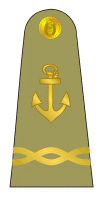
Rank group	Senior NCOs					Junior NCOs		Enlisted
Argentine Naval Prefecture
Argentine Naval Prefecture	Ayudante mayor	Ayudante principal	Ayudante de primero	Ayudante de segundo	Ayudante de tercera	Cabo primero	Cabo segundo	Marinero
Equivalent U.S. Coast Guard Rank	Master Chief Petty Officer	Senior Chief Petty Officer	Chief Petty Officer	Petty Officer First Class	Petty Officer Second Class	Petty Officer Third Class	Seaman	Seaman Apprentice
