= Argentine Air Force Mobile Field Hospital =

Hospital in Argentina

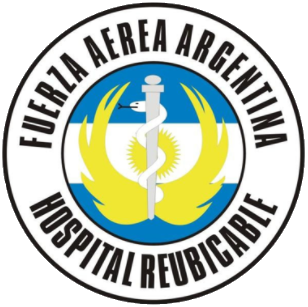

Geography
- Location: Government of Argentina, Argentina
- Coordinates: 18.57844°N 72.27593°W

History
- Founded: August 21, 1981; 45 years ago

Links
- Website: argentina.gob.ar/hospitalreubicable

The Argentine Air Force Mobile Field Hospital (Spanish: Hospital Reubicable de la Fuerza Aérea) is a field hospital operated by the Argentine Air Force. Established on August 21, 1981, it is one of three health centres of its kind worldwide.

== Description ==
The unit has a 64-member staff of military personnel and civilians and is made up of 14 containers which, when fully assembled, occupy an area of 360 m^{2}. Fourteen flights of C-130 Hercules aircraft are needed to fully deploy the hospital.

Among the services provided by the hospital are general clinic, surgery, dentistry, pharmacy, etc. The hospital has its own laboratory, water purification plant and power generation engine.

Thanks to its isolation, the construction can withstand temperatures from -15 to 40 degrees Celsius, and can endure harsh tremors as demonstrated when it remained operational after the earthquake of January 2010 in Haiti.

== Deployments ==
- 1981 : San Luis Province
- 1982 : Comodoro Rivadavia during the Falklands War
- 1983 : Chaco and Formosa provinces
- 1984-1986 : Buenos Aires province
- 1993-1995 : Mozambique under United Nations mandate
- 2000-2003 : Kosovo Force (KFOR) under NATO mandate
- 2004 : Deployment to Afghanistan aborted due Hurricane Jeanne: Deployed to Haiti instead.
- 2004–2017 : MINUSTAH medical facility in Haiti
- 2010 Feb/Sep : Curicó after the Chile earthquake ^{video Chile}

=== 2010 Haiti earthquake ===
On January 12, 2010 while deployed at Port-au-Prince, serving as a medical facility for MINUSTAH troops, the hospital was the only one still open following the earthquake, and treated nearly 1,000 people on the first night.

U.S. presidents Barack Obama and Bill Clinton congratulated Argentina for the quick response of the hospital in the first critical hours after the earthquake Secretary of State Hillary Clinton did the same during her visit to Buenos Aires on 1 March 2010
