= Nunca menos =

Argentine political commercial

Nunca menos (Spanish: "Never less") is a 2011 Argentine political campaign television commercial, made in support of Néstor Kirchner, who died in 2010. It also supports the government of Cristina Fernández de Kirchner, who was reelected for a second term in the 2011 Argentine general election.

== Development ==
The commercial was developed three months after the death and state funeral of Néstor Kirchner. The lyrics were written by Horacio Bouchoux, and the video includes 120 singers. The video features musician Horacio Fontova, legislators Eric Calcagno and Ariel Pasini, actors like Víctor Laplace, Gustavo Garzón and Lito Cruz, and organizations such as "Descamisados" and "Negros de mierda" [sic]. The copyright of the song was given to the youth organization The Cámpora.

== Political controversy ==
The Radical Civic Union (UCR) considers the commercial a violation of the law that regulates the political campaign. The law authorizes political commercials only during a certain time period, at television timeouts determined by the government (the purchase of advertisement time to host such commercials is not allowed), and within a defined time length. The government, however, has no restrictions in promoting government actions, educative, artistic or cultural works.

The UCR considers that the "Nunca Menos" commercial can not be considered within the allowable exceptions, and that it is a clear act of forbidden proselitism, with an undeniable identification with the Kirchnerist political party, a misuse of the state treasury, seen as electoral campaign by all people, and not following any applicable laws. As a result, the UCR filled a writ of amparo against the commercial.

== Criticism ==
The video was criticised by journalist Ernesto Tenembaum because of not following the usual standards of political commercials: rather than highlighting positive aspects of the Kirchner administration, it focuses on negative things, without encouraging a will of improvement. The "Nunca menos" slogan thus becomes similar to a "this is better than nothing" slogan. The unusual length of the commercial, more than four minutes, goes against usual television standards for commercials, and may alienate independent voters against the government.
