= Pablo Gerardo González =

Argentine politician (born 1968)

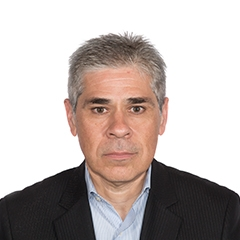

President of YPF
- In office 19 January 2021 – 14 December 2023
- Preceded by: Guillermo Nielsen
- Succeeded by: Horacio Marín

National Deputy
- In office 10 December 2019 – 19 January 2021
- Constituency: Santa Cruz

Vice Governor of Santa Cruz
- In office 10 December 2015 – 10 December 2019
- Governor: Alicia Kirchner
- Preceded by: Fernando Cotillo
- Succeeded by: Eugenio Quiroga

Councillor of Magistracy
- In office 18 November 2014 – 10 December 2015
- Appointed by: Senate

National Senator
- In office 10 December 2011 – 10 December 2015
- Constituency: Santa Cruz

Provincial Deputy of Santa Cruz
- In office 10 December 2007 – 30 June 2008
- Constituency: Río Gallegos

Personal details
- Born: 13 June 1968 (age 58) Río Gallegos, Argentina
- Party: Justicialist Party
- Other political affiliations: Front for Victory (2003–2017); Unidad Ciudadana (2017–2019); Frente de Todos (2019–present)

Pablo Gerardo González (born 13 June 1968) is an Argentine politician who served as a National Deputy and a National Senator for Santa Cruz. A member of the Justicialist Party, González also served as Vice Governor of Santa Cruz under Alicia Kirchner from 2015 to 2019. From 2021 to 2023, he was president of YPF, Argentina's state-owned energy company.

== Early life ==
González was born on 13 June 1968 in Río Gallegos, Santa Cruz. He finished high school at Colegio Salesiano Nuestra Señora de Luján, in Río Gallegos, and studied law at the National University of La Plata. In addition, he has a degree in hydrocarbons law from Universidad Austral.

== Political career ==
Before being appointed to any political post, González was an aide at the Santa Cruz state-owned water and energy company, Servicios Públicos Sociedad del Estado, in 1993. The following year, he became director of Distrigas S.A. In 1996, he returned to Servicios Públicos as a legal affairs manager. In 2003, he was appointed undersecretary of tax resources of Santa Cruz Province, during the last years of Néstor Kirchner's governorship.

He was a state attorney from 2003 to 2007, when he was designated Minister of Government of Santa Cruz by governor Daniel Peralta. That same year, he was elected to the provincial Chamber of Deputies, wherein he served as first vice president. From 2008 to 2011, he was cabinet chief of Peralta's provincial government.

=== National Senator ===
In the 2011 legislative election, González was elected to the National Senate as the first candidate in the Front for Victory (FPV) list, followed by María Ester Labado. The list received 65.83% of the vote, granting both González and Labado the two seats for the majority as per the upper house's limited voting system. As senator, González presided the permanent mixed commission on accounting, and served as secretary of the commission on Energy, Mining and Fuels. He also formed part of the commissions on Constitutional Affairs, Justice, Criminal Affairs, General Legislation, Budget and Finances, National Economy and Investment, Labour and Social Prevision, Rights and Guarantees, and Federal Tax Redistribution.

In 2014, he was appointed as one of the Senate's representatives to the Council of Magistracy of the Nation.

=== Vice Governor and Deputy ===
In 2015, he was Alicia Kirchner's running mate in her gubernatorial run in Santa Cruz. The Kirchner-González ticket won the election with 34.42% of the vote (50.97% in total, as per the ley de lemas). He assumed office on 10 December 2015; his vacancy in the Senate was filled by Virginia María García.

In the 2019 legislative election, González ran for a seat in the National Chamber of Deputies as the first candidate in the Frente de Todos list, followed by Paola Vessvessian. The Frente de Todos list was the most voted in Santa Cruz, with 62.13% of the vote, and both González and Vessvessian were elected. He was sworn in on 4 December 2019. As a deputy, González was a supporter of the 2020 Voluntary Interruption of Pregnancy bill, which legalised abortion in Argentina.

=== President of YPF ===
In January 2021, he was appointed by President Alberto Fernández as the new president of YPF, Argentina's state-owned oil and energy company, in replacement of Guillermo Nielsen. His vacancy in the Chamber was filled by Jorge Guillermo Verón.
