= Kolina =

Argentine political party

National Liberation Current Corriente de Liberación Nacional
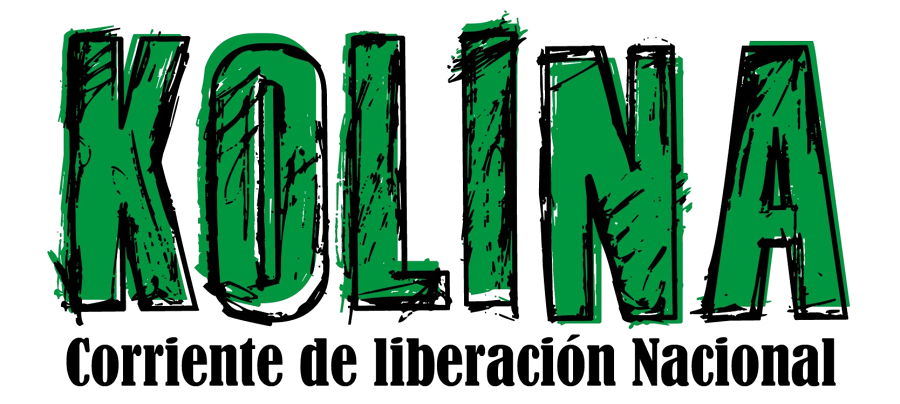
- Abbreviation: Kolina
- Leader: Alicia Kirchner
- President: Carlos Castagneto
- Vice President: Victoria Montenegro
- Secretary: Claudio Morresi
- Founded: 20 July 2010; 15 years ago
- Split from: Justicialist Party
- Membership (2017): ▼49,174
- Ideology: Kirchnerism; Peronism
- Political position: Left-wing
- National affiliation: Homeland Force
- Colors: Green
- Seats in the Chamber of Deputies: 1 / 257
- Seats in the Senate: 1 / 72
- Province Governors: 0 / 24

Website
- www.kolina.org.ar

Kolina (an acronym of Corriente de Liberación Nacional, lit. 'National Liberation Current') is a Kirchnerist political party in Argentina founded in 2010 by Alicia Kirchner, sister of former president of Argentina, Néstor Kirchner. The party now forms part of Unión por la Patria, the former ruling coalition supporting then-President Alberto Fernández. At the time of its foundation and until the alliance's dissolution, the party was a member of the Front for Victory.

Following the 2019 general election, the party has representation in the Argentine Chamber of Deputies (the National Deputies Lisandro Bormioli, María Rosa Martínez and Paola Vessvessian belong to Kolina). In addition, Alicia Kirchner was governor of Santa Cruz Province from 2015 to 2023.

== History ==
=== Foundation. ===
Kolina was created on July 20, 2010, as a current rather than as a party, in order to express a "political space of the national movement" that goes beyond the idea of a party, admitting that it acts as a party. people not affiliated with the party.

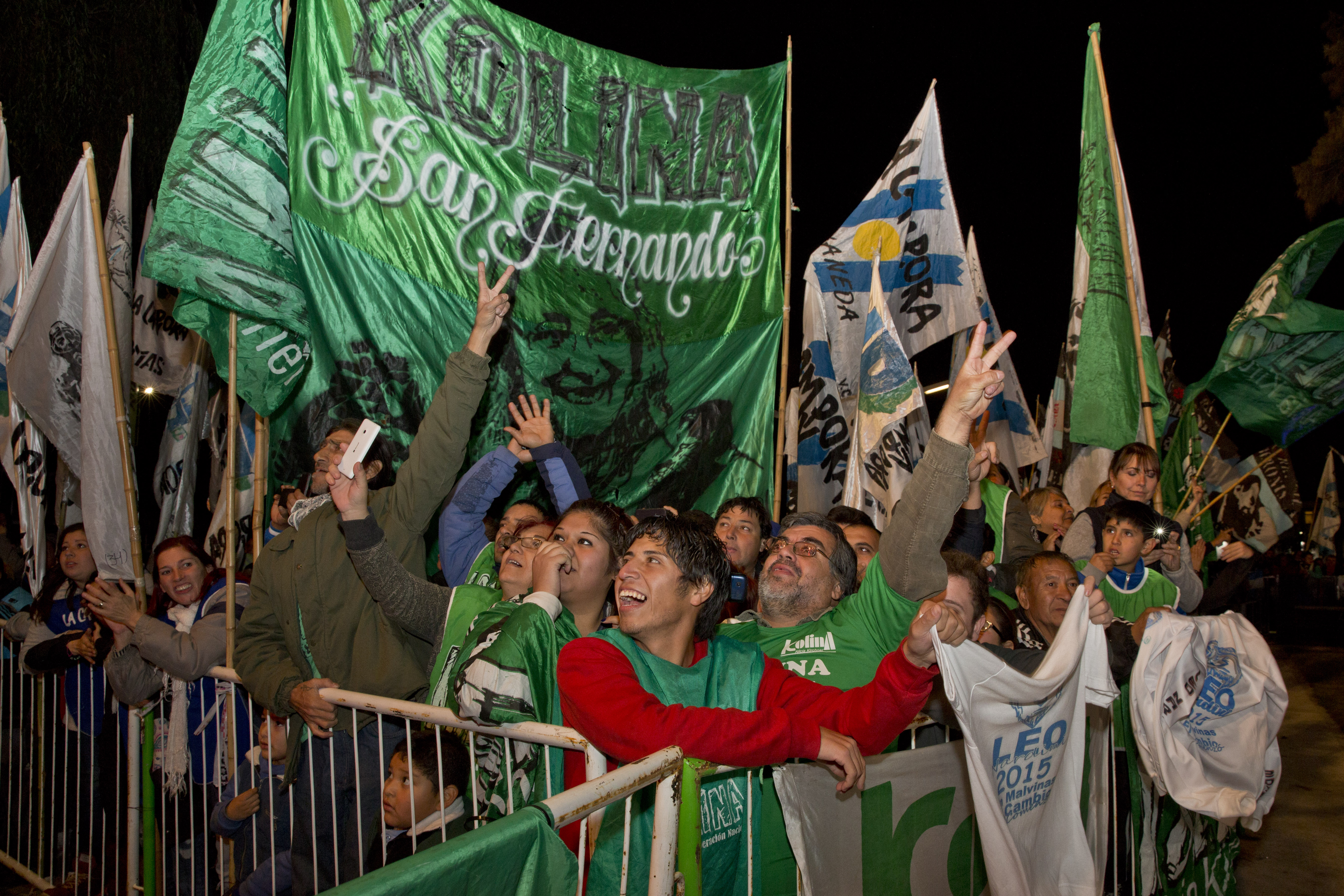
KOLINA supporters in Buenos Aires, 2015.

== Electoral performance ==
=== President ===
| Election year | Candidate | Coalition | 1st round | | 2nd round | | Result |
| Election year | Candidate | Coalition | # of overall votes | % of overall vote | # of overall votes | % of overall vote | Result |
|---|---|---|---|---|---|---|---|
| 2011 | Cristina Kirchner | Front for Victory | 11,865,055 | 54.11 (1st) | —N/a | | ✓ Elected |
| 2015 | Daniel Scioli | Front for Victory | 9,338,449 | 37.08 (1st) | 12,198,441 | 48.60 (2nd) | ✗ 2-R Defeated |
| 2019 | Alberto Fernández | Frente de Todos | 12,473,709 | 48.10 (1st) | —N/a | | ✓ Elected |

=== Chamber of Deputies ===
| Election year | Votes | % | seats won | total seats | position | presidency | notes |
|---|---|---|---|---|---|---|---|
| 2011 | 10,762,217 | 47.98 (#1st) | 0 | 0 / 257 | Minority | Cristina Fernández de Kirchner (PJ—FPV) | within Front for Victory |
| 2013 | 7,775,204 | 34.41 (#1st) | 0 | 0 / 257 | Minority | Cristina Fernández de Kirchner (PJ—FPV) | within Front for Victory |
| 2015 | 8,797,279 | 37.41 (#1st) | 2 | 2 / 257 | Minority | Mauricio Macri (PRO—Cambiemos) | within Front for Victory |
| 2017 | 5,265,069 | 21.03 (#2nd) | 0 | 2 / 257 | Minority | Mauricio Macri (PRO—Cambiemos) | within Citizen's Unity |
| 2019 | 11,359,508 | 45.50 (#1st) | 3 | 3 / 257 | Minority | Alberto Fernández (PJ—FDT) | within Frente de Todos |
| 2019 | 7,962,347 | 33.64 (#2nd) | 0 | 3 / 257 | Minority | Alberto Fernández (PJ—FDT) | within Frente de Todos |

== See also ==
- Kolina members
- Front for Victory
