= María Rosa Martínez =

Argentine politician

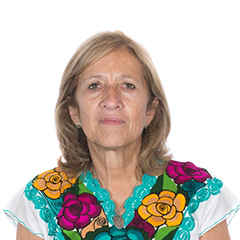

Provincial Senator of Buenos Aires
- Incumbent
- Assumed office 10 December 2023

National Deputy
- In office 10 December 2019 – 10 December 2023
- Constituency: Buenos Aires

Personal details
- Born: 29 September 1955 (age 70) Rojas, Buenos Aires Province, Argentina
- Party: Kolina
- Other political affiliations: Front for Victory (2008–2017); Unidad Ciudadana (2017–2019); Frente de Todos (2019–2023); Union for the Homeland (2023–present)

María Rosa Martínez (born 29 September 1955) is an Argentine trade unionist and politician, currently serving as member of the Buenos Aires Province Senate, elected in 2023. A member of Kolina, she was elected to the Chamber of Deputies in 2019 as part of the Frente de Todos. Martínez previously worked in a number of positions in the Ministry of Social Development during the administration of Alicia Kirchner (2007–2015), and as a city councillor in Almirante Brown. She is also active in the Corriente Federal de Trabajadores (CFT).

== Early life ==
Martínez was born on 29 September 1955 in Rojas, a minor town in Northern Buenos Aires Province. Martínez has a technician's degree in communication. She became politically active in the Juventud Peronista Universitaria (the student wing of the Justicialist Party) in her youth; her activism in led to her arrest during the last military dictatorship.

== Political career ==
Martínez is politically aligned with the Corriente Federal de Trabajadores (CFT), a confederation of trade unions, and with Kolina, a kirchnerist party led by Alicia Kirchner. In 2008, she was appointed Director of Social Rights at the Ministry of Social Development, then under the leadership of Alicia Kirchner. Later, from 2010 to 2013, she was Undersecretary of Human Rights and Equal Opportunities of Almirante Brown Partido, in the administration of Daniel Bolettieri. Martínez also served as Director of Administrative Organisations and Director of Gender Policies at the Ministry of Social Development, and as an advisor to Alicia Kirchner as well.

In 2015, Martínez was elected to the City Council of Almirante Brown Partido as part of the Front for Victory.

=== National Deputy ===
Martínez ran for a seat in the Argentine Chamber of Deputies in the 2019 legislative election; she was the 18th candidate in the Frente de Todos list in Buenos Aires Province. The list received 51.64% of the vote, enough for Martínez to be elected.

As a national deputy, Martínez formed part of the parliamentary commissions on Social Action and Public Health, Cooperative Affairs and NGOs, Communications, Culture, Labour Legislation, Women and Diversity, Natural Resources, and Human Rights and Guarantees. She was a supporter of the 2020 Voluntary Interruption of Pregnancy bill, which legalized abortion in Argentina. She was also a supporter and sponsor of the Travesti-Trans labour quota law.

=== Buenos Aires Senate ===
She was elected to the Buenos Aires Province Senate in the 2023 Buenos Aires provincial election as a member of Union for the Homeland political coalition, representing the 3rd electoral section.

== Electoral history ==
Electoral history of María Rosa Martínez
Election	Office	List	#	District	Votes			Result	Ref.
Election	Office	List	#	District	Total	%	P.	Result	Ref.
2015	Councillor	Front for Victory	2	Almirante Brown Partido	137,765	43.47%	1st (Note: Presented on an electoral list. The data shown represents the share of the vote the entire party/alliance received in that constituency.)	Elected	
2019	National Deputy	Frente de Todos	18	Buenos Aires Province	5,113,359	52.64%	1st	Elected	
