= María Nélida Doga =

Argentine politician (born 1947)

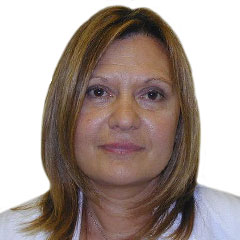

National Deputy
- In office 10 December 2003 – 10 December 2007
- Constituency: Buenos Aires

Minister of Social Development
- In office 12 February 2002 – 25 May 2003
- President: Eduardo Duhalde
- Preceded by: Daniel Sartor
- Succeeded by: Alicia Kirchner

Personal details
- Born: 1947 (age 78–79) La Plata, Argentina
- Party: Justicialist Party
- Education: National University of La Plata

María Nélida "Chichí" Doga (born 1947) is an Argentine psychologist and Justicialist Party politician. She served as Minister of Social Development during the presidency of Eduardo Duhalde from 2002 to 2003, and as a National Deputy from 2003 to 2007.

== Early life and career ==
Born in La Plata, she studied psychology at the National University of La Plata, graduating in 1970. She later taught courses at her alma mater as well as at the National University of Lomas de Zamora. As of 2002, she was married to a baritone at the Teatro Municipal de La Plata and had four children.

== Political career ==
A political ally of Duhalde and his wife, Hilda "Chiche" González, Doga was appointed to the Ministry of Social Development to succeed Daniel Sartori following on her recommendation Duhalde's accession to the presidency in interim fashion, in the aftermath of the 2001 political crisis. Prior to her appointment, she had chaired the Buenos Aires Province Council on Children and Families. During her tenure as minister, she was noted by Argentine media as keeping a "low profile", as she did not concede any live interviews on TV and rarely addressed the public.

In the 2003 general election, she was elected to the National Chamber of Deputies, running on the Justicialist Party list in Buenos Aires Province. Following the 2005 legislative election, she followed Duhalde's supporters in breaking ranks with the government of Néstor Kirchner, forming part of the dissident Federal Peronism parliamentary bloc.

In the 2011 general election, she ran for one of Buenos Aires Province's three seats in the Argentine Senate as an alternate candidate in the Popular Front list, which supported the presidential candidacy of Eduardo Duhalde and the senatorial candidacy of Chiche Duhalde.

Political offices
Preceded by Daniel Sartor	Minister of Social Development; 2002–2003	Succeeded by Alicia Kirchner
