= Superpowers law =

The Superpowers law is the informal name given in Argentina to a change in the law of financial administration, which allows the Chief of the Cabinet of Ministers to make changes to the Government budget, without requiring authorization from the Congress. It is named that way because it increases the attributions of the executive power, taking attributions from the legislative power.

It was sanctioned in 2001, during the 1998–2002 Argentine great depression, and it was meant as a temporary measure. However, it was renewed several times, despite the end of the crisis. It was made permanent in 2006, during the presidency of Néstor Kirchner.
