= Máximo Kirchner =

Argentine politician (born 1977)

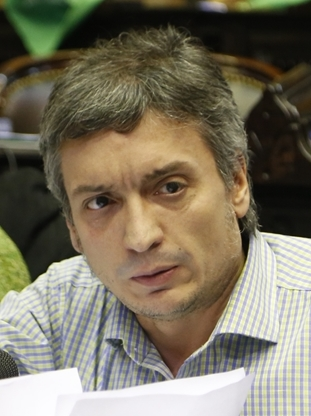
- Kirchner in 2018

National Deputy
- Incumbent
- Assumed office 10 December 2015
- Constituency: Santa Cruz (2015–2019); Buenos Aires (since 2019)

Personal details
- Born: Máximo Carlos Kirchner; 16 February 1977 (age 49) La Plata, Buenos Aires, Argentina
- Party: Justicialist Party
- Other political affiliations: Front for Victory (2003–2017); Citizen's Unity (2017–2019); Frente de Todos (2019–2023); Union for the Homeland (2023–present)
- Domestic partner: Rocío García (2008–2018)
- Children: 2
- Parents: Néstor Kirchner (father); Cristina Fernández de Kirchner (mother)
- Relatives: Alicia Kirchner (aunt)

Máximo Carlos Kirchner (born 16 February 1977) is an Argentine politician who has served as a National Deputy since 2015. He is the son of two former presidents of Argentina, Néstor Kirchner and Cristina Fernández de Kirchner. A member of the Justicialist Party, he is the co-founder of La Cámpora, a political youth organisation which supported the presidencies of his parents.

Since 2019, he has served as president of the Frente de Todos parliamentary bloc in the Chamber of Deputies. In 2021, he was elected president of the Buenos Aires Province Justicialist Party.

== Early life ==
Máximo Kirchner was born in La Plata. He attended the República de Guatemala high school in Río Gallegos, Santa Cruz Province, where his father worked as governor. Later, in Buenos Aires, he studied law and journalism but did not finish either course.

== Political career ==
In 2006, alongside other emerging political leaders such as Andrés Larroque, Eduardo de Pedro, Juan Cabandié and Mariano Recalde, Kirchner founded La Cámpora, a youth political organisation formed to group young supporters of his father's government. The organisation's leadership eventually passed to Larroque, who has since December 2006 acted as its secretary general.

=== Congressman ===
In the 2015 legislative election, Kirchner ran for a seat in the National Chamber of Deputies as the first candidate in the Front for Victory (FPV) list in Santa Cruz Province. Although the FPV came second in the election, with 46.30% of the vote Kirchner received enough votes to be elected. During his 2015–2019 term, he was appointed as the opposition's representative in the Bicameral Commission for the control of the decrees of necessity and urgency. He was also appointed to the parliamentary commissions on Energy and Fuels, Mining, Impeachments, and Freedom of Expression. During his first three years in office, he introduced 23 bills to the chamber and co-signed two resolutions. In that period he voted affirmatively 186 times, negatively 115 times, abstained 9 times and had 141 absences.

In the 2019 legislative election, Kirchner ran for re-election in Buenos Aires Province instead of Santa Cruz. He was the fifth candidate in the party list of the newly formed Frente de Todos, which received 52.64% of the vote – enough for Kirchner to be elected. Upon taking office, he became president of the unified Frente de Todos parliamentary bloc. On February 1, 2022, Kirchner resigned as President of the Frente de Todos bloc over a disagreement with President Alberto Fernandez over his government's deal with the International Monetary Fund.

In December 2021, he was elected president of the Buenos Aires Province Justicialist Party.

== Personal life ==
Kirchner was formerly in a relationship with Rocío García, a dentist, with whom he had two children: Néstor Iván, born in 2013 in Buenos Aires, and Emilia, born in 2016 in Río Gallegos. Kirchner and García separated in 2018 after nearly 10 years together. Kirchner is of German, Swiss-German, Spanish and Croatian descent. As a result of the U.S. State Department's sanctions on his mother Cristina, Máximo Kirchner is forbidden to enter American soil.

== Electoral history ==
Electoral history of Máximo Kirchner
Election	Office	List	#	District	Votes			Result	Ref.
Election	Office	List	#	District	Total	%	P.	Result	Ref.
2015	National Deputy	Front for Victory	1	Santa Cruz Province	70,603	46.30%	2nd (Note: Presented on an electoral list. The data shown represents the share of the vote the entire party/alliance received in that constituency.)	Elected	
2019	National Deputy	Frente de Todos	5	Buenos Aires Province	5,113,359	52.64%	1st	Elected	

== Controversies ==
=== Asset declarations and wealth evolution ===
Various media outlets and journalistic organizations have reported on the evolution of the assets declared by Kirchner in his sworn financial statements submitted to the Anti-Corruption Office (OA). In a survey by Chequeado based on sworn statements as of 31 December 2024 (submitted in 2025), Kirchner was listed among the legislators with the largest declared wealth, with a reported total of ARS 8.311 billion and 27 properties declared.

Regarding increases in declared assets over different years, Chequeado noted that part of the assets reported by Kirchner is linked to inheritances, and cited statements by the legislator himself attributing the composition of his wealth to the estate of Néstor Kirchner and to accounting revaluations of declared assets.

=== Complaints over alleged inconsistencies in asset declarations (2020) ===
In October 2020, media outlets reported that lawyer Silvina Martínez announced and/or filed a criminal complaint against Kirchner for alleged illicit enrichment and falsification of public documents, based on discrepancies between private estimates and the information declared to the OA.

In November 2020, Clarín reported that a prosecutor requested information and sworn statements in connection with the complaint publicized by that outlet, as part of the initial procedural measures of the case.

=== Transfer of family assets (2016) and debate over forfeitures (2025) ===
In 2016, media reported that Cristina Fernández de Kirchner carried out a transfer/adjudication of assets in favor of her children Máximo and Florencia within the succession proceedings of Néstor Kirchner, in a context of ongoing judicial investigations against the former president.

In 2025, in the context of asset enforcement and discussions over forfeiture linked to the conviction of Cristina Fernández de Kirchner in the case known as Vialidad, media reported that the court granted participation to Máximo and Florencia Kirchner to debate the inclusion of assets in their names, considering them third parties unrelated to the main proceedings. In December 2025, Infobae reported that Cristina Kirchner's defense requested the exclusion of her children's properties from forfeiture, and that the matter would be reviewed by the Federal Chamber of Criminal Cassation.

=== Hotesur–Los Sauces case ===
Kirchner is among the defendants in the case known as Hotesur–Los Sauces, related to alleged money laundering and other crimes, in connection with rentals of hotels and properties owned by family companies to businesspersons.

In December 2024, the Supreme Court upheld the decision allowing the oral trial in the Hotesur–Los Sauces case to proceed. In 2025, media reported delays in the start of the proceedings due to pending measures and expert reports.

=== Parliamentary absences and attendance criticism ===
Kirchner's parliamentary performance has also been subject to public attention regarding his level of absences. In 2017, Chequeado reported that he was among the deputies with the highest number of absences from sessions during 2016, according to official records of the Chamber of Deputies, noting that the session attendance counting system does not necessarily coincide with effective presence during votes.

The Chamber of Deputies also publishes a record of roll-call votes and absences by legislator, broken down by legislative year.

=== Internal dispute within the Buenos Aires PJ (2021) ===
His assumption as head of the Buenos Aires branch of the Justicialist Party (PJ) took place in a context of internal controversy. Mayor Fernando Gray filed objections and legal challenges related to the party process, which were covered by various media outlets during 2021.
