= Ricardo del Val =

Argentinian politician

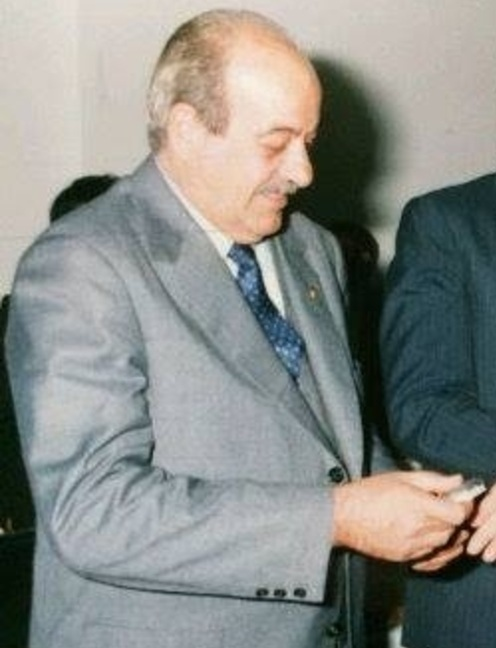
Ricardo del Val

Ricardo del Val (1934–2005) was an Argentine politician. He was elected governor of Santa Cruz in 1987 but suffered an embolism and was treated in Buenos Aires. Vice governor José Ramón Granero served as governor during his illness. He returned to the province one year later. Néstor Kirchner, who sought to become governor of Santa Cruz the following turn, organized an impeachment that removed him from office.
