= Paola Vessvessian =

Argentine politician

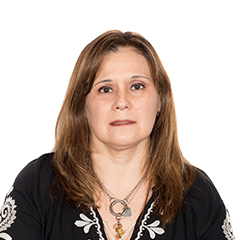

National Deputy
- In office 10 December 2019 – 10 December 2023
- Constituency: Santa Cruz

Minister of Social Development of Santa Cruz
- In office 10 December 2015 – 10 December 2019
- Governor: Alicia Kirchner
- Preceded by: Elsa Capuchinelli
- Succeeded by: Bárbara Weinzettel

Personal details
- Born: Marcela Paola Vessvessian; 19 March 1971 (age 55) Río Gallegos, Argentina
- Party: Kolina
- Other political affiliations: Front for Victory (2003–2017); Unidad Ciudadana (2017–2019); Frente de Todos (2019–present)

Marcela Paola Vessvessian (born 19 March 1971) is an Argentine politician. A member of Kolina, she was elected in 2019 to serve as a National Deputy in Santa Cruz. Vessvessian previously served as Minister of Social Development of Santa Cruz during the first governorship of Alicia Kirchner (2015–2019).

== Early life ==
Vessvessian was born on 19 March 1971 in Río Gallegos, Santa Cruz into a family of Armenian background. She has a licenciatura degree on Social Work.

== Political career ==
Vessvessian's political career began under the mentorship of Alicia Kirchner. When Kirchner split from the Justicialist Party and formed Kolina, Vessvessian became part of the new party's national authority. During Kirchner's administration the Ministry of Social Development, Vessvessian served as secretary of childhood, adolescence, and families, and chaired the National Committee for the Coordination of Social Policies. In 2015, following Kirchner's election as governor of Santa Cruz, Vessvessian was appointed as the province's minister of social development.

In the 2019 legislative election, Vessvessian ran for a seat in the National Chamber of Deputies as the second candidate in the Frente de Todos list, behind Pablo Gerardo González. The Frente de Todos list was the most voted in Santa Cruz, with 62.13% of the vote, and both González and Vessvessian were elected. She was sworn in on 4 December 2019.

As a national deputy, Vessvessian formed part of the parliamentary commissions on Petitions, Powers and Norms, Women and Diversity, Sports, Elderly People, Co-operative Affairs and NGOs, and Social Action and Public Health. She was also elected by her peers as president of the bicameral commission to appoint an Ombudsperson for Children. Vessvessian was a supporter of the 2020 Voluntary Interruption of Pregnancy bill, which legalised abortion in Argentina.
