= Alicia Kirchner =

Argentine politician (born 1946)

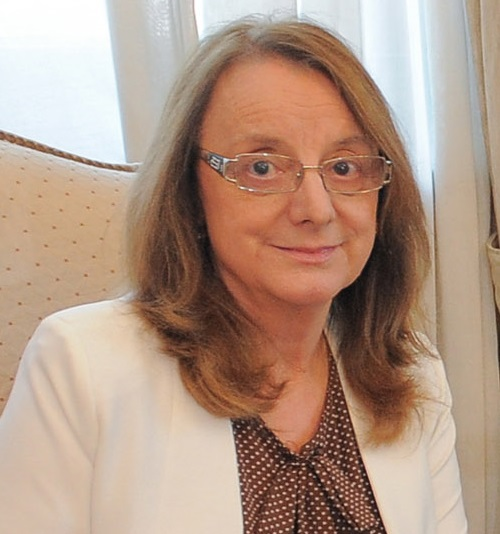

National Senator
- Incumbent
- Assumed office 10 December 2023
- Constituency: Santa Cruz
- In office 10 December 2005 – 14 August 2006
- Constituency: Santa Cruz

Governor of Santa Cruz
- In office 10 December 2015 – 10 December 2023
- Vice Governor: Pablo Gonzalez (2015–2019); Eugenio Quiroga (2019–present)
- Preceded by: Daniel Peralta
- Succeeded by: Claudio Vidal

Minister of Social Development
- In office 14 August 2006 – 10 December 2015
- President: Néstor Kirchner; Cristina Fernández de Kirchner
- Preceded by: Juan Carlos Nadalich
- Succeeded by: Carolina Stanley
- In office 25 May 2003 – 10 December 2005
- President: Néstor Kirchner
- Preceded by: María Nélida Doga
- Succeeded by: Juan Carlos Nadalich

Personal details
- Born: Alicia Margarita Kirchner Ostoić; 18 July 1946 (age 80) Río Gallegos, Santa Cruz, Argentina
- Party: Kolina (since 2010)
- Other political affiliations: Front for Victory (2003–2019); Frente de Todos (2019–2023); Union for the Homeland (2023–present)
- Spouse: Elvio Macchia
- Relatives: Néstor Kirchner (brother); Cristina Fernández de Kirchner (sister-in-law)
- Education: University of Buenos Aires; National University of General San Martín

Alicia Margarita Kirchner Ostoić (born 18 July 1946) is an Argentine politician. She is the elder sister of the late former President Néstor Kirchner and served in his government as Minister of Social Development, a role which she held under President Cristina Fernández de Kirchner, her sister-in-law, until the end of her presidential term on 9 December 2015. She served two consecutive terms as governor of her native Santa Cruz Province from 2015 to 2023.

Since 2023, she has sat in the Argentine Senate as one of the three senators from Santa Cruz. She previously held the position from 2005 to 2007.

== Biography ==
Kirchner Ostoić worked as a teacher and social worker, holding a PhD in social work. From 1975 to 1983 she served as a sub-secretary of social action in her native Santa Cruz Province. From 1987 to 1990 she was a minister in the municipality of Río Gallegos, leading on public health, education, culture, social action, recreation and sport. For a few months in 1990, and again between 1991 and 1995 she served as provincial minister for social affairs, under her brother who had been elected governor of Santa Cruz.

She resigned in 1995 to stand for Mayor of Río Gallegos but lost and worked in the Argentine Senate advising on education and family matters, returning to her ministerial position between 1997 and 2003.

In May 2003, Néstor Kirchner became president and appointed his sister to his cabinet in a similar position she held under him at provincial level. In December 2005, Alicia Kirchner was elected to the Argentine Senate as senator for Santa Cruz Province for the Front for Victory faction, replacing her sister-in-law, Cristina Fernández de Kirchner, who stood in Buenos Aires Province. From her senate seat in a few months she steered two important social development matters through the Senate and was widely seen as still holding great influence in the ministry.

However, in August 2006 she returned to her former position in the cabinet replacing Juan Carlos Nadalich, leaving her senate seat vacant during a leave of absence.

Kirchner was touted as a likely Front for Victory candidate to be governor of Santa Cruz in the 2007 elections, with fellow minister Julio de Vido as the other possible candidate mentioned.

President Kirchner's re-appointment of his sister to his cabinet was seen in some quarters as an initial show of support for her as candidate. Ultimately, however, Kirchner remained a minister following the 2007 elections (and Daniel Peralta became governor of Santa Cruz).

In 2015, Kirchner ran as a FpV gubernatorial candidate again under the "Siempre Santa Cruz" slate with Pablo Gerardo González as running mate, winning the governorship with 51,797 votes, defeating the rival FpV slate "Santa Cruz Somos Todos" and other party candidates. Former president Cristina Fernandez de Kirchner and her son Máximo Kirchner flew from Buenos Aires on 10 December 2015, to attend Alicia Kirchner's swearing-in ceremony.

Alicia Kirchner also founded the National Liberation Current (KOLINA), a national political activist organization and political party, on 20 July 2010.

=== Governor of Santa Cruz ===
==== Cabinet ====
Chief of cabinet and ministers
Office	Incumbent	Period
General secretary of government	Claudia Alejandra Martínez	10 December 2015
Minister of government	Fernando Miguel Basanta	10 December 2015
Minister of economy and public works	Juan Franco Donnini	10 December 2015
Minister of production	Leonardo Darío Álvarez	10 December 2015
Minister of social welfare	Marcela Paola Vessvessian	10 December 2015
Minister of health	María Rocío García	10 December 2015
Provincial council of education	Roberto Luis Borselli	10 December 2015
Secretaries
Office	Incumbent	Period
General accounting	CPN Mónica Mabel Morandi	10 December 2015
General Treasury	Elena Argentina González de Ramps	10 December 2015

Political offices
Preceded by María Nélida Doga	Minister of Social Development; 2003–2005	Succeeded by Juan Carlos Nadalich
Preceded by Juan Carlos Nadalich	Minister of Social Development; 2005–2015	Succeeded by Carolina Stanley
Preceded by Daniel Peralta	Governor of Santa Cruz; 2015–2023	Succeeded by Claudio Vidal
