= Guillermo Nielsen =

Argentine economist (born 1951)

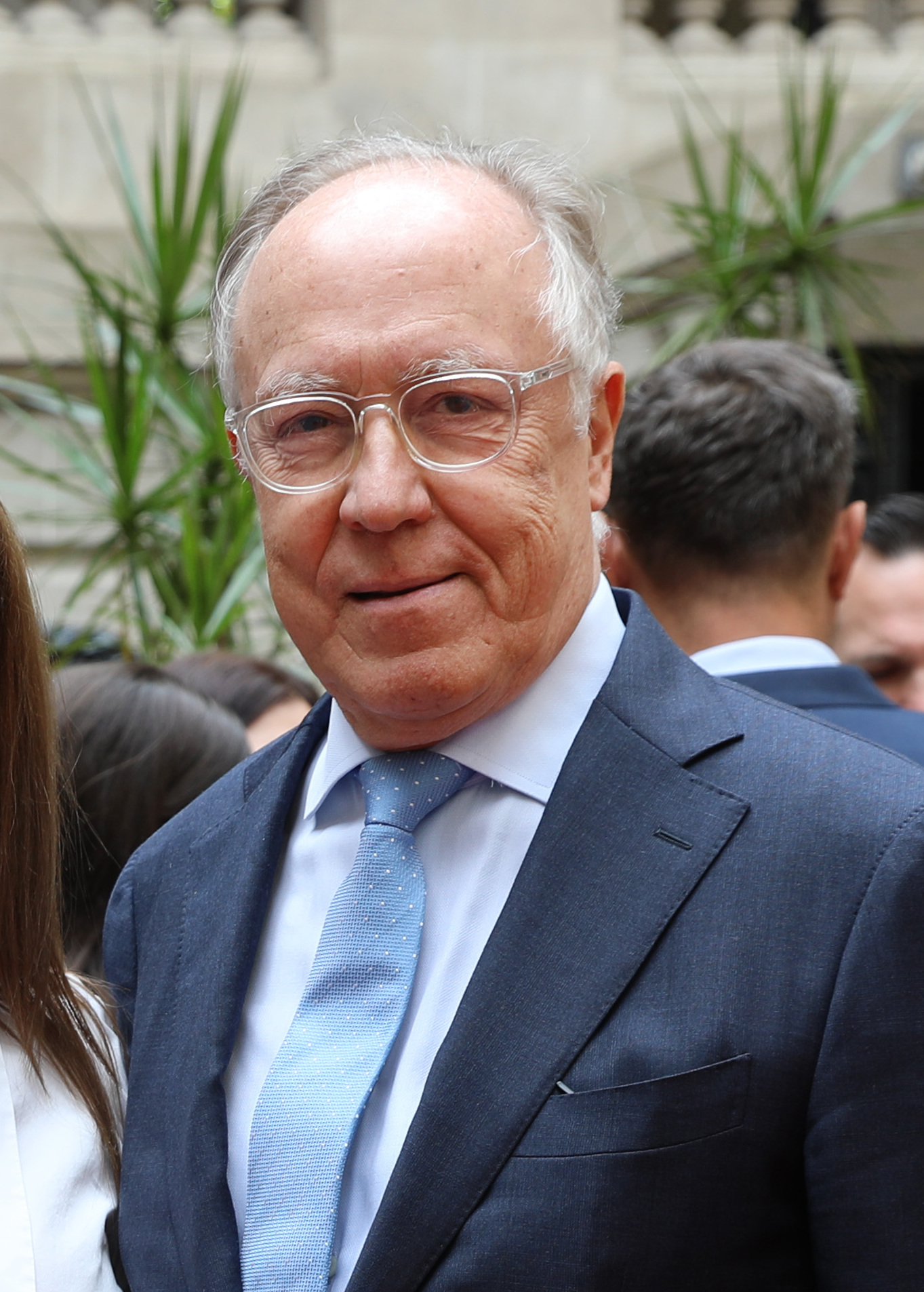
Guillermo Nielsen

Guillermo Nielsen (born 20 April 1951) is an Argentinian economist who was president of the State-owned oil company YPF from 2019 to 2021. He also served as Ambassador of Argentina in Germany designated by President Cristina Fernández de Kirchner between 2008 and 2010. Since 2024, he is the Argentine ambassador to Paraguay.

Nielsen earned a degree in economics from the University of Buenos Aires and an M.A. in economics from Boston University, where he was a Ph.D. candidate. During the presidencies of Néstor Kirchner and Eduardo Duhalde, Nielsen served as Secretary of Finance from May 2002 to December 2005, working with Economy Minister Roberto Lavagna on the Argentine debt restructuring and leading negotiations for two stand-by agreements with the International Monetary Fund.
