= La Cámpora =

Argentine political youth organization

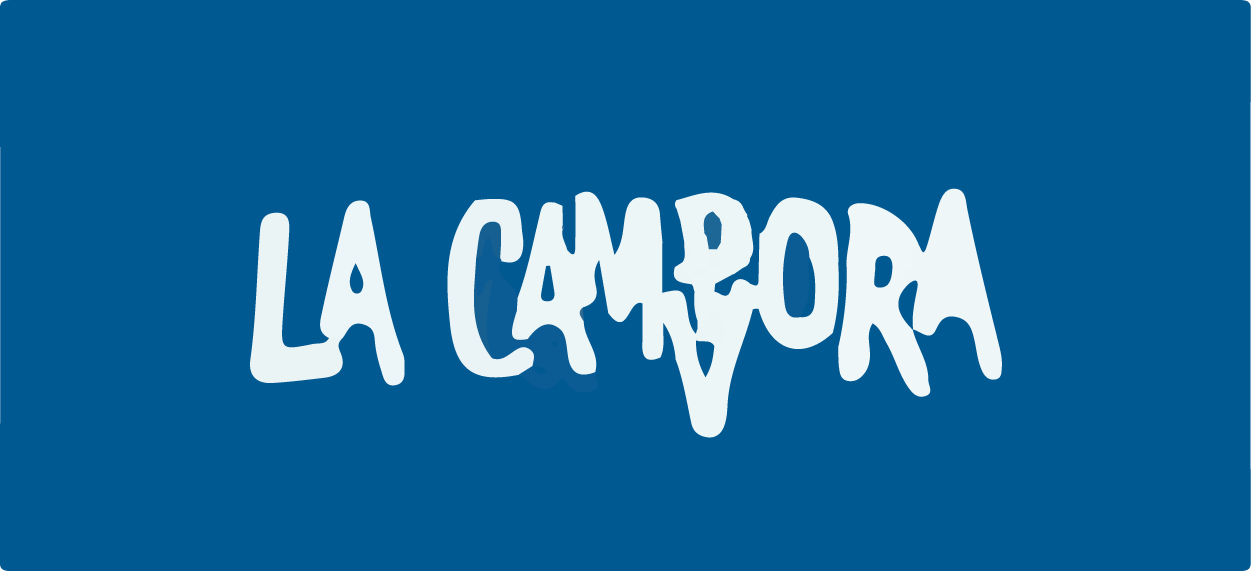
- Leader: Máximo Kirchner
- Secretary General: Lucía Cámpora
- Founded: 28 December 2006
- Headquarters: Buenos Aires
- Ideology: Peronism; Kirchnerism
- Position: Left-wing
- Mother party: Justicialist Party
- National affiliation: Unión por la Patria
- Slogan: La patria es el otro (The homeland is the other)
- Website: https://www.lacampora.org/

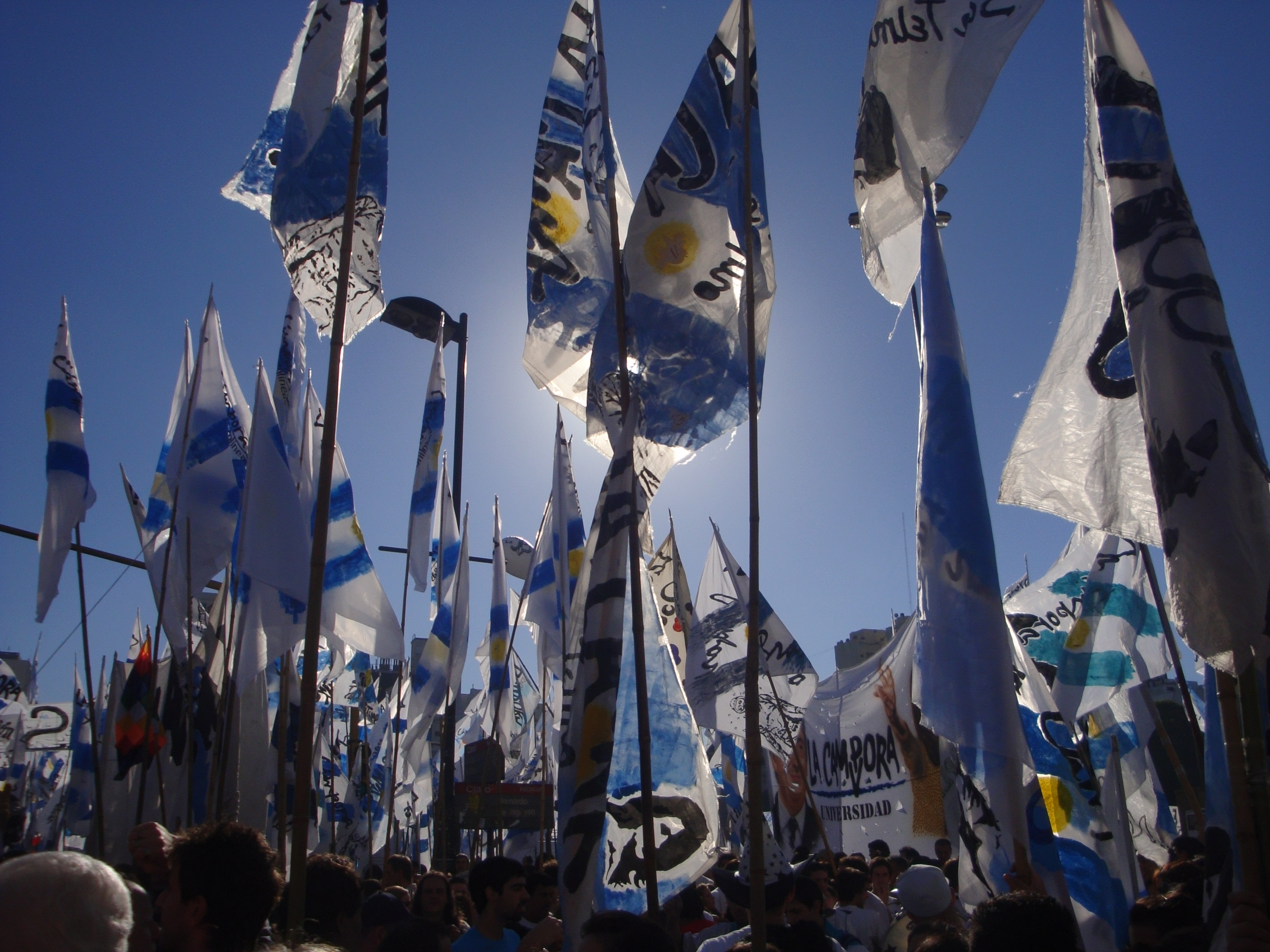
Members of "La Cámpora" during a demonstration

La Cámpora is an Argentine left-wing political youth organization supporting the governments of Néstor Kirchner and Cristina Fernández de Kirchner. It is named after former Peronist president Héctor José Cámpora. It was established by Máximo Kirchner in 2006 and became politically prominent after the death of former president Néstor Kirchner. This organization also promotes awareness or activism of Human rights in Argentina.

== History ==
La Cámpora was created by Máximo Kirchner, son of Néstor Kirchner and Cristina Fernández. Its origins can be traced back to the 2003 Argentine general election, in order to support Néstor Kirchner, and has extended said support to Cristina Fernández de Kirchner during the 2008 Argentine government conflict with the agricultural sector, to counter the opposing demonstrations.

La Cámpora's methodology bears no similarity to the Montoneros though, aiming instead to confront the discourse implemented by the political right wing through what it perceives as their dominance of the Argentine media that opposes any and all changes implemented by the Kirchner administration. They use new technologies, including blogs, Facebook, Twitter and other social networks on the internet, La Cámpora confronts the media conglomerates that control the vast majority of Argentine media and work, according to La Cámpora, to undermine the Kirchner administration.

Initially, the group had the usual low profile of most youth wings. After the death of Néstor Kirchner in 2010, the organization became one of the three factions struggling for power within the Kirchner administration, the others being the General Confederation of Labour and the traditional structure of the Justicialist Party. Cristina Fernández instructed that the lists of candidates for provincial legislators included at least two or three members of the Cámpora among the first eight.

A violent clash broke out between the group's members and those of the construction workers union UOCRA.

== See also ==
- Kirchnerism
- Members of La Cámpora
