= Death and state funeral of Néstor Kirchner =

2010 state funeral in Argentina

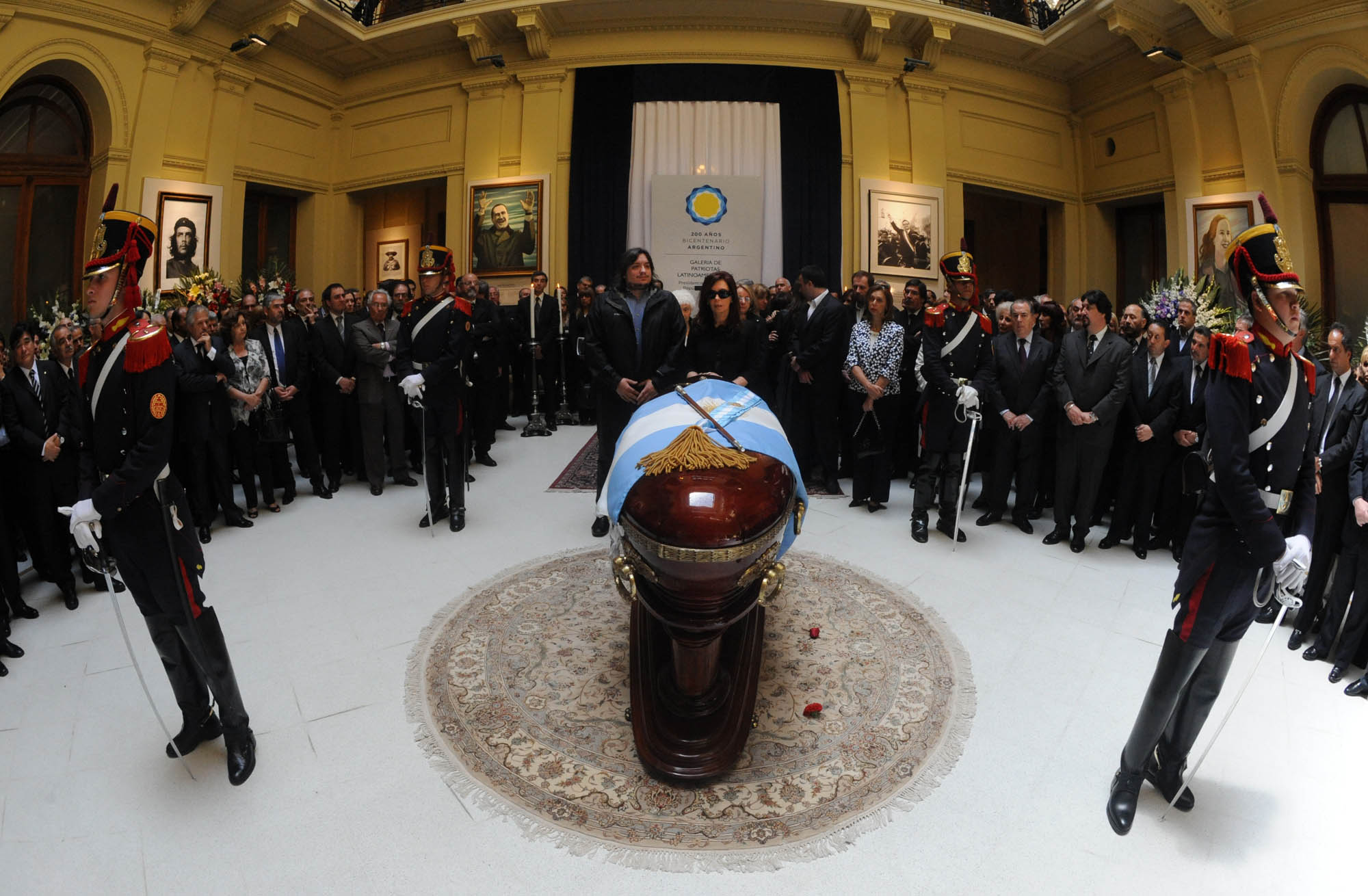
- Kirchner's state funeral at Casa Rosada
- Date: 27–29 October 2010
- Location: Casa Rosada, Buenos Aires
- Participants: Cristina Fernández de Kirchner; Evo Morales; Hugo Chávez; Luiz Inácio Lula da Silva; Juan Manuel Santos; Sebastián Piñera; Rafael Correa

Néstor Kirchner, former President of Argentina, died of heart failure on the morning of 27 October 2010 at the Jose Formenti hospital in El Calafate, Santa Cruz Province at the age of 60. Efforts to revive him were unsuccessful. His wife, President Cristina Fernández de Kirchner, was present with him when he died. He was expected to run for president in 2011.

He had two coronary interventions earlier that year. On 7 February 2010, he developed problems with the common carotid artery and needed surgery. On 11 September 2010, he was hospitalized due to coronary artery blockage and needed an angioplasty.

For more than 24 hours, hundreds of thousands of people filed past Kirchner’s body lying in state, in a state funeral at the Casa Rosada attended by several Argentine personalities and eight South American leaders. Starting 29 October afternoon, a massive popular procession accompanied the remains of Néstor Kirchner from Casa Rosada to the metropolitan airport, and then from the airport of Río Gallegos to the cemetery.

== Funeral ==
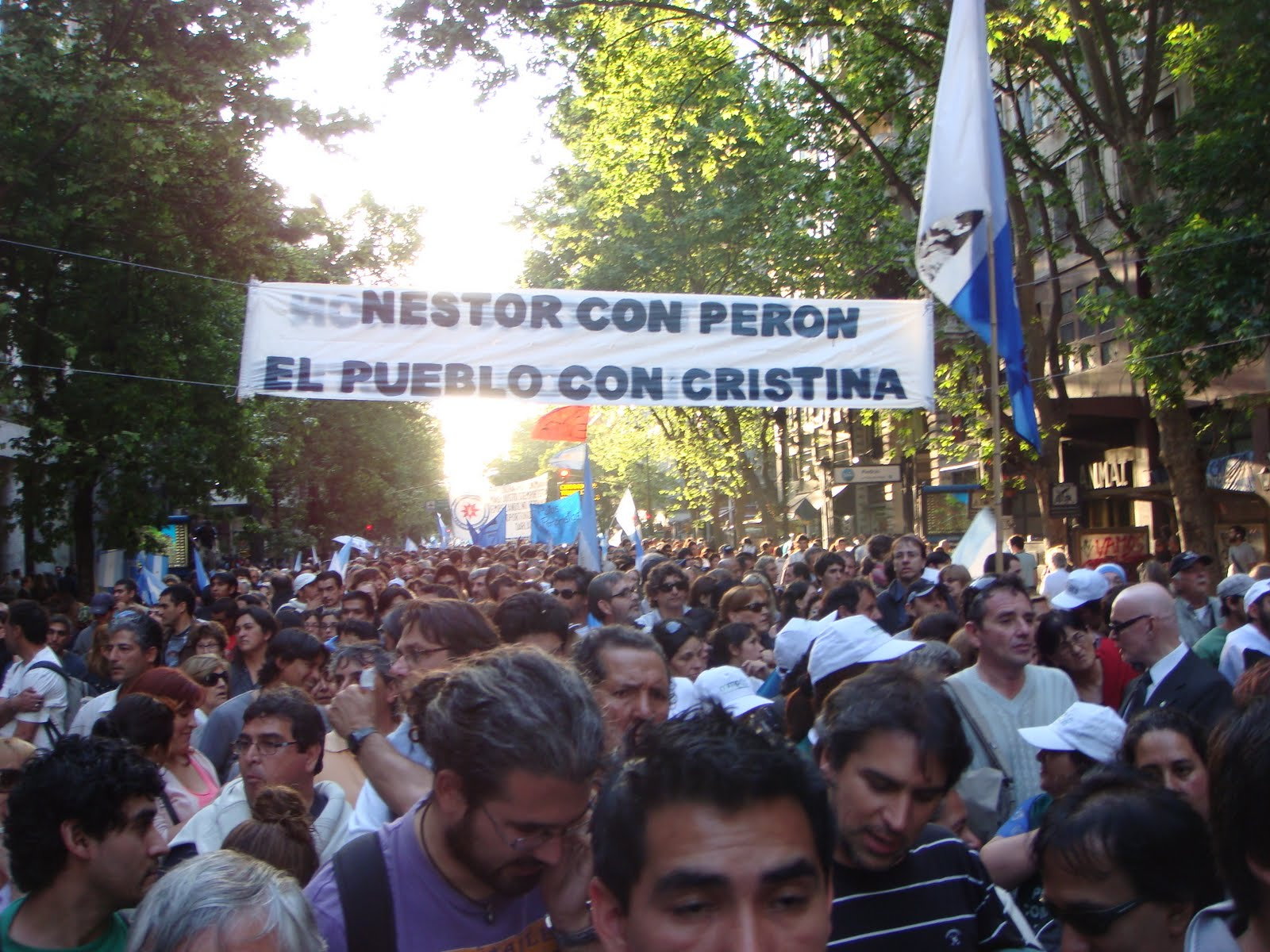
Citizens along Avenida de Mayo, waiting to enter Casa Rosada to pay homage to Néstor Kirchner. The sign reads "Néstor with Perón. The People with Cristina".

His private funeral was attended by his family and close friends. A state funeral was held on 28 October 2010, while a vigil was kept at the Casa Rosada presidential palace in Buenos Aires, starting on the morning of 28 October, with the attendance of Latin American leaders.

President Cristina Kirchner and her two children, Máximo and Florencia, also attended the funeral services. Presidents Evo Morales, José Mujica, Sebastián Piñera, Fernando Lugo, Rafael Correa, Luiz Inácio Lula da Silva, Juan Manuel Santos and Hugo Chávez joined her at the wake. Opposition party leaders and other notable people from the fields of arts, entertainment, and professional sports also paid tribute to Kirchner’s political savvy by attending his funeral, among tens of thousands of Argentine private citizens that waited in line to enter the Latin American patriots hall, where Néstor Kirchner’s body stood in the state.

Tens of thousands of people, in a demonstration of popular grief and support for president Cristina Fernández de Kirchner, spontaneously gathered at Plaza de Mayo, Buenos Aires, on the night of 27 October. Thousands of them spent the night in the open waiting for the state funeral to take place There were posters bearing the slogan "Néstor forever, hang in there Cristina." Mourners and supporters waved hundreds of banners and chanted slogans as they waited to file past Kirchner’s body lying in state.

People waited in line to get into the Casa Rosada. Starting on the afternoon of 29 October, a massive popular procession accompanied the remains of Néstor Kirchner from Casa Rosada to the metropolitan airport., and then from the airport of Río Gallegos to the cemetery. Kirchner was buried in a private ceremony, attended only by his wife, family, and Venezuelan President Hugo Chávez, who had remained with the President’s family throughout the mourning period in Argentina.

== Reactions ==
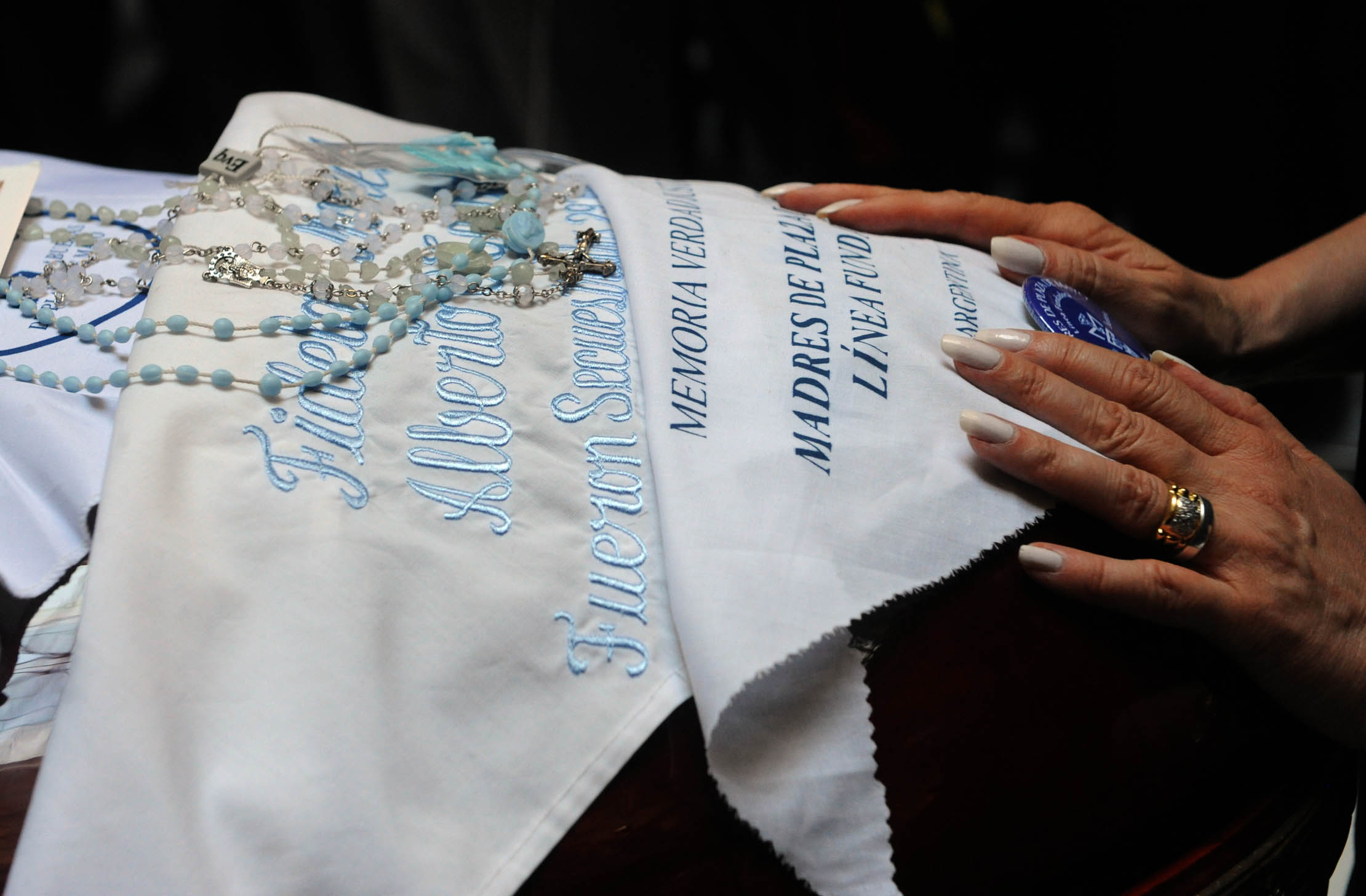
Mothers of the Plaza de Mayo pay tribute to Néstor Kirchner.

=== Domestic ===
Representatives of various parts of the political spectrum and institutions at odds with his political persona expressed condolences over the country’s and the widow’s loss, and solidarity with President Fernández de Kirchner.

Estela Barnes de Carlotto, president of Grandmothers of the Plaza de Mayo said: "Our country needed this man. We lost someone indispensable." Pino Solanas said: "He was a great president, he made an excellent administration. He was one in a million fighter politician." His former cabinet chief Alberto Fernández said: "He’s been the best President of Democracy. I’ve lost a friend, above all differences." CGT Secretary General Hugo Moyano said "The people will recognize the continuing government effort Kirchner inaugurated in 2003." Emilio Pérsico of the Evita Movement said, "There will be a demonstration to honor Kirchner and to show Cristina that we’re with her, supporting her. In these days we’ll be demonstrating in the streets that we are millions who will replace Kirchner."

Argentina declared three days of national mourning. All Argentinian football league games were postponed until the following week.

=== International ===
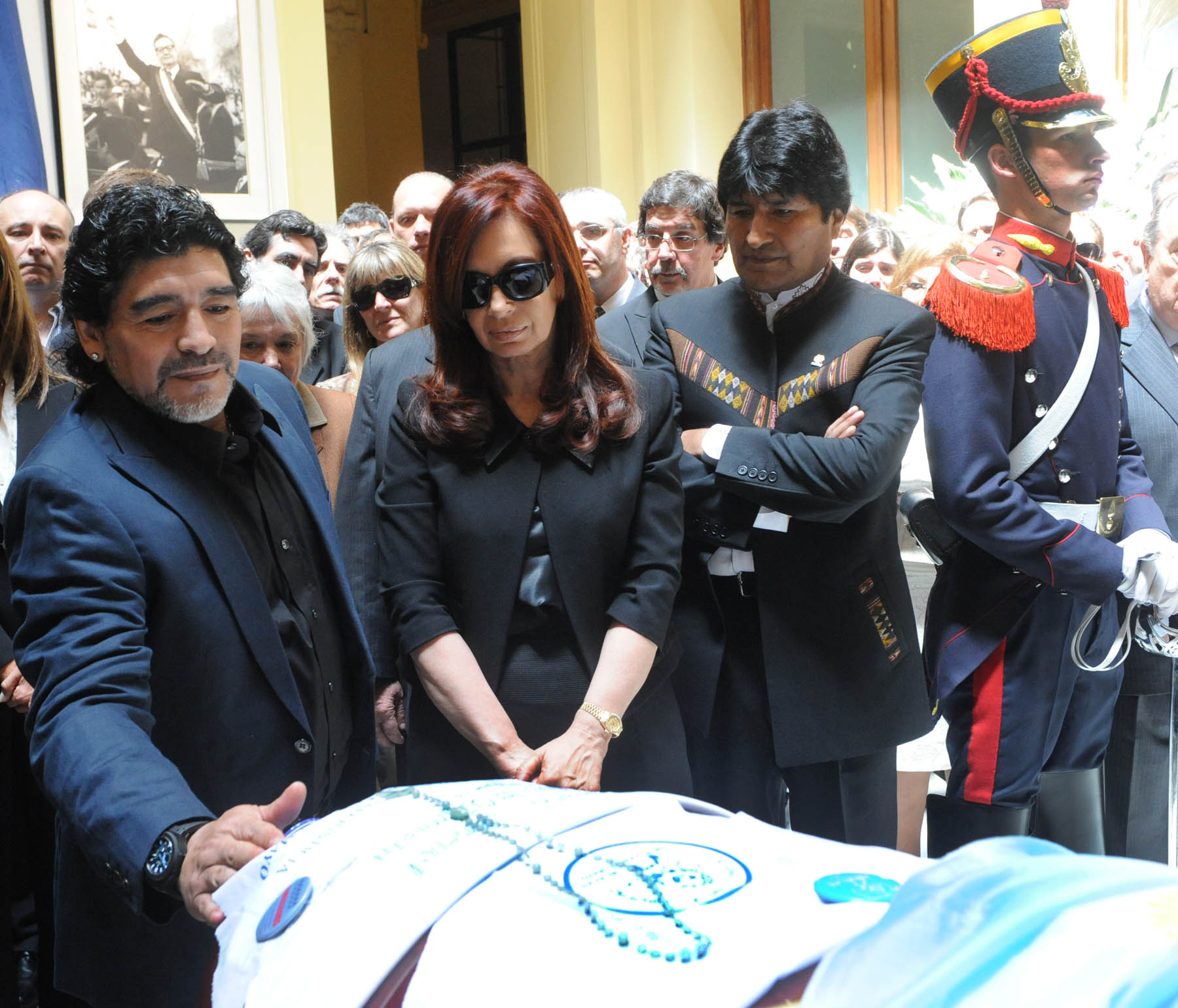
Cristina Fernández de Kirchner is joined by retired professional football player Diego Maradona and Bolivian president Evo Morales

Many leaders around the world sent condolences to his widow, president Cristina Fernández de Kirchner and to the rest of Argentina.

Supranational bodies

Condolences came from the UN Secretary-General Ban Ki-moon, the European Union’s president of European Council Herman Van Rompuy and the president of the European Parliament Jerzy Buzek. The OAS underlined his "tireless efforts and dedication towards Human Rights promotion through the hemisphere," while UNASUR declared three days of national mourning in all South American countries. The group issued a statement that read: "The death of Néstor Kirchner deprives Latin America of a key leader in the building of an inclusive region [...] He was convinced of the unity of Latin American peoples. He fought all his life for profound changes in his country and Latin America, and worked from different agencies for social justice, equity, democracy and integration".

Heads of state

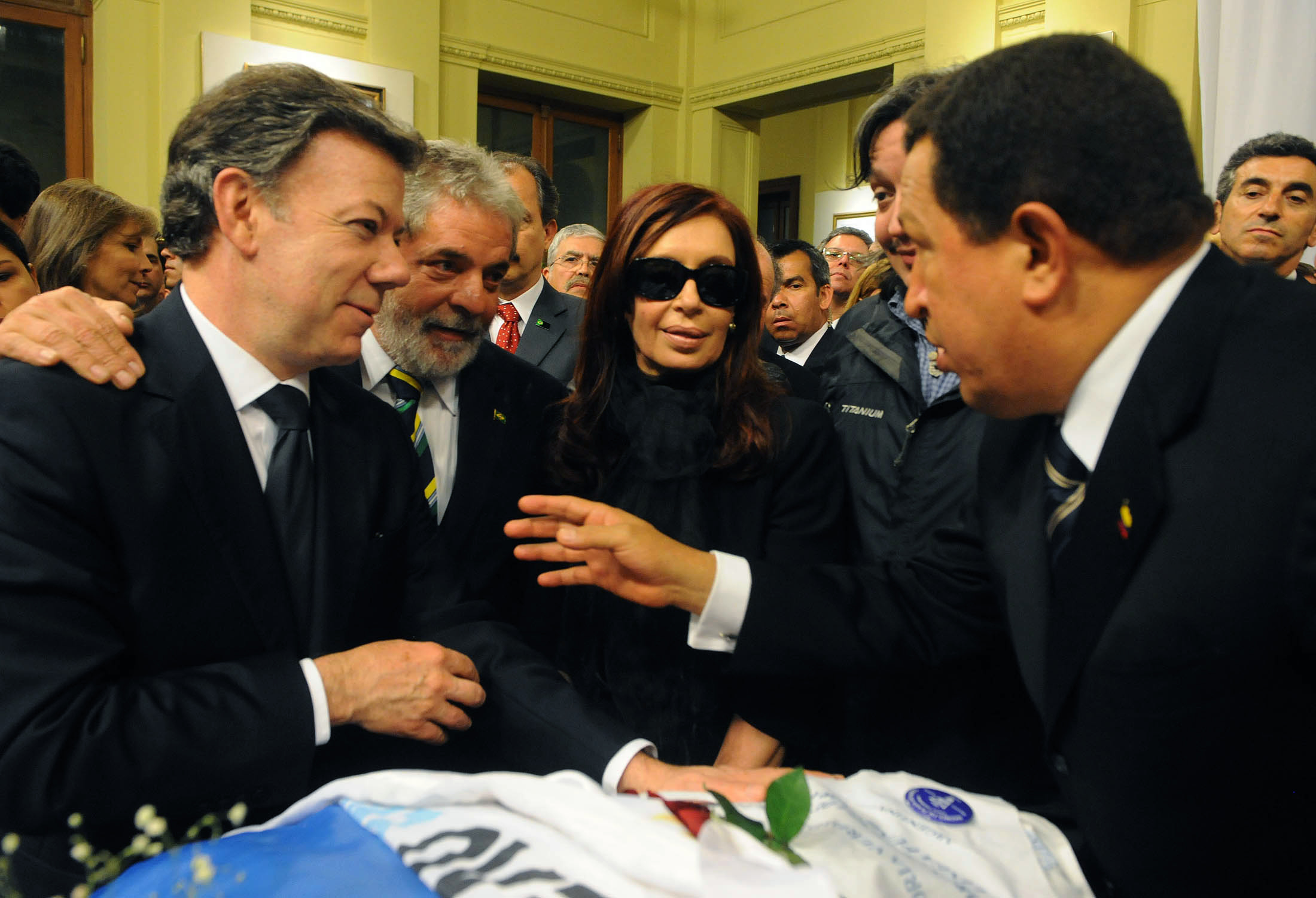
Presidents Juan Manuel Santos, Luiz Inácio Lula da Silva and Hugo Chávez with President Cristina Fernández de Kirchner

Eight South American Heads of State (Luiz Inácio Lula da Silva of Brazil, Sebastián Piñera of Chile, José Mujica of Uruguay, Juan Manuel Santos of Colombia, Fernando Lugo of Paraguay, Evo Morales of Bolivia, Hugo Chávez of Venezuela and Rafael Correa of Ecuador) traveled to Buenos Aires and many other offered condolences including Barack Obama of the United States, Queen Elizabeth II, Felipe Calderón of Mexico, Alan García of Peru, Álvaro Colom of Guatemala, Daniel Ortega of Nicaragua, Dmitry Medvedev of Russia, Giorgio Napolitano of Italy, Ilham Aliyev of Azerbaijan, Aníbal Cavaco Silva of Portugal, Bronisław Komorowski of Poland, Prime Minister José Luis Rodríguez Zapatero of Spain and German Chancellor Angela Merkel

Venezuelan President Hugo Chavez, Mexican president Felipe Calderón, President of Chile Sebastián Piñera and Nicaraguan President Daniel Ortega all lauded his contributions to Latin America. Brazil, Venezuela, Chile and Colombia declared three days of national mourning. Peru declared a day of national mourning.

Other state reactions

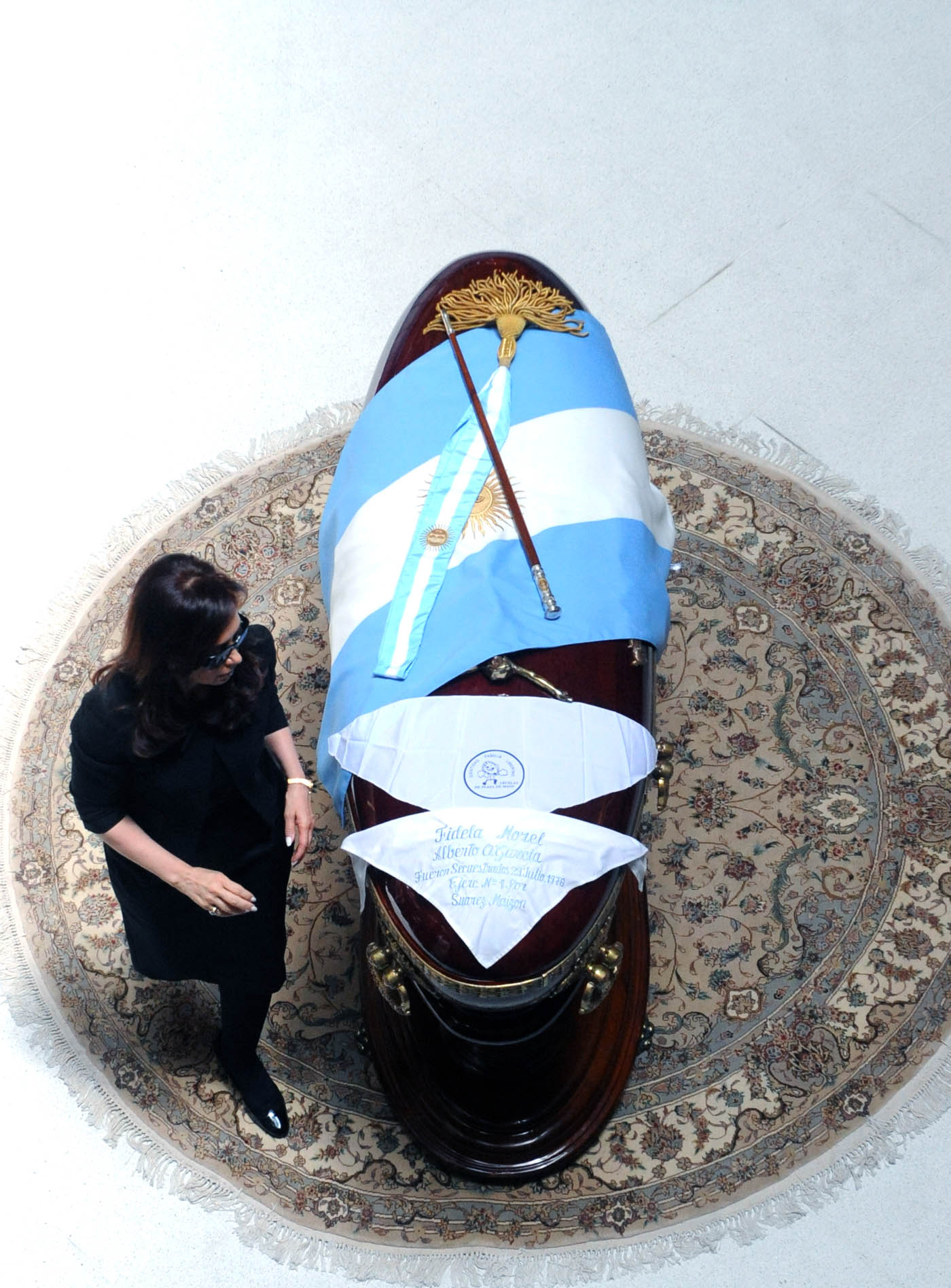
President Cristina Fernández de Kirchner passing by her husband’s coffin, lying in state at the Latin American patriots hall of the Casa Rosada.

President and former Chief of Staff of Brazil, Dilma Rousseff, expressed her grief and said "Latin America and the whole world is mourning. Kirchner was a great friend of Brazil".

Secretary of State Hillary Clinton described Kirchner as "an advocate for the citizens of Argentina and a leading voice for South American integration." France’s Minister of Foreign Affairs Bernard Kouchner said: "He was a decisive figure in Argentine history. Argentina lost a statesman who collaborated in the development of his country, its economic recovery and the growth of its international standing [...] He was one of the architects of Latin American regional integration."

The government of China issued a statement saying "Kirchner was a good friend of the Chinese people and greatly contributed to the development of the China-Argentina strategic partnership."

== Consequences ==
Despite not being president or having any official position in the executive branch at the time of his death, Néstor Kirchner was involved in the management of his wife’s government. Moreover, he managed most things personally, rather than delegating tasks to subordinates. As a consequence, his death forced a complete rearrangement of Cristina’s administration: although no ministers were removed, they changed their specific tasks.

Julio de Vido was in charge of negotiating with Hugo Moyano, Pablo Moyano and the CGT. Moyano admitted that his relation with Néstor Kirchner was easier than with Cristina. The negotiations with the local politicians in the Greater Buenos Aires were managed by De Vido, Amado Boudou and Florencio Randazzo. Boudou became a confidante of Cristina, but did not achieve autonomy for negotiations.

The 2011 general election had a high number of precandidates. Pre-election polling suggested that voting would be divided between a government candidate, a Peronist candidate and a third one agreed by the UCR and the socialists. The Federal Peronism party considered Mauricio Macri, Eduardo Duhalde, Alberto Rodríguez Saá, Mario Das Neves, Felipe Solá and Carlos Reutemann. The UCR had Ricardo Alfonsín, Julio Cobos and Ernesto Sanz. The center-left had Hermes Binner and Pino Solanas, and Elisa Carrió ran with her own party. Most opposing candidates lost their social appeal after the death of Néstor Kirchner.

The death of Kirchner generated as well a rise in the number of hawks within the government, mainly Amado Boudou, Juan Manuel Abal Medina and the Cámpora.
