= Néstor Kirchner =

President of Argentina from 2003 to 2007

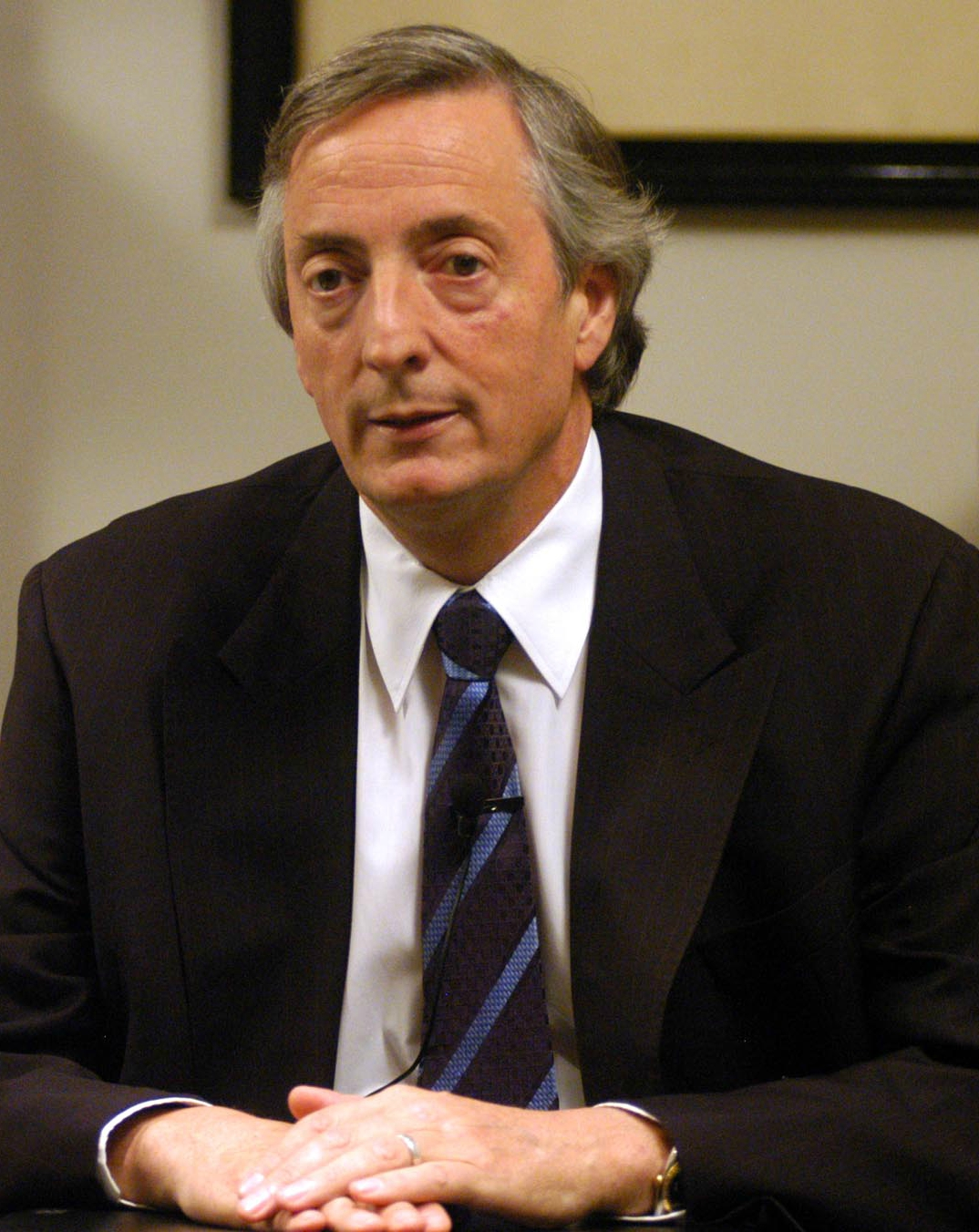
- Kirchner in 2005

54th President of Argentina
- In office 25 May 2003 – 10 December 2007
- Vice President: Daniel Scioli
- Preceded by: Eduardo Duhalde
- Succeeded by: Cristina Fernández de Kirchner

First Gentleman of Argentina
- In role 10 December 2007 – 27 October 2010
- President: Cristina Fernández de Kirchner
- Preceded by: Cristina Fernández de Kirchner (as First Lady)
- Succeeded by: Juliana Awada (as First Lady, 2015)

89th Governor of Santa Cruz
- In office 10 December 1991 – 25 May 2003
- Vice Governor: Eduardo Arnold; Héctor Icazuriaga
- Preceded by: Ricardo del Val
- Succeeded by: Héctor Icazuriaga
Additional positions
Secretary General of UNASUR
In office 4 May 2010 – 27 October 2010
Preceded by	Office established
Succeeded by	María Emma Mejía Vélez
National Deputy
In office 10 December 2009 – 27 October 2010
Constituency	Buenos Aires
President of the Justicialist Party
In office 11 November 2009 – 27 October 2010
Preceded by	Daniel Scioli
Succeeded by	Daniel Scioli
In office 25 April 2008 – 29 June 2009
Preceded by	Ramón Ruiz
Succeeded by	Daniel Scioli
Member of the Constitutional Convention
In office 1 May 1994 – 22 August 1994
Constituency	Santa Cruz
Intendant of Río Gallegos
In office 10 December 1987 – 10 December 1991
Preceded by	Jorge Marcelo Cepernic
Succeeded by	Alfredo Anselmo Martínez

Personal details
- Born: Néstor Carlos Kirchner; 25 February 1950 Río Gallegos, Santa Cruz, Argentina
- Died: 27 October 2010 (aged 60) El Calafate, Santa Cruz, Argentina
- Resting place: Mausoleum of Néstor Kirchner, Río Gallegos
- Party: Justicialist
- Other political affiliations: Front for Victory (2003–2010)
- Spouse: Cristina Fernández (m. 1975)
- Children: 2, including Máximo
- Education: National University of La Plata
- Profession: Lawyer
- Néstor Kirchner's voice Néstor Kirchner's speech for the Day of Remembrance for Truth and Justice (recorded March 24, 2004)

Néstor Carlos Kirchner (Note: [ˈnestoɾ ˈkaɾlos ˈkiɾʃneɾ]) (25 February 1950 – 27 October 2010) was an Argentine lawyer and politician who served as the president of Argentina from 2003 to 2007. A member of the Justicialist Party, he previously served as Governor of Santa Cruz Province from 1991 to 2003, and mayor of Río Gallegos from 1987 to 1991. He later served as first gentleman of Argentina during the early tenure of his wife, Cristina Fernández de Kirchner, the first person to serve in this role. Ideologically, he identified himself as a Peronist and a progressive, with his political approach called Kirchnerism.

Born in Río Gallegos, Santa Cruz, Kirchner studied law at the National University of La Plata. He met and married Cristina Fernández at this time, returned with her to Río Gallegos at graduation, and opened a law firm. Commentators have criticized him for a lack of legal activism during the Dirty War, an issue he would involve himself in as president. Kirchner ran for mayor of Río Gallegos in 1987 and for governor of Santa Cruz in 1991. He was reelected governor in 1995 and 1999 due to an amendment of the provincial constitution. Kirchner sided with Buenos Aires provincial governor Eduardo Duhalde against President Carlos Menem.

Although Duhalde lost the 1999 presidential election, he was appointed president by the Congress when previous presidents Fernando de la Rúa and Adolfo Rodríguez Saá resigned during the December 2001 riots. Duhalde suggested that Kirchner run for president in 2003 in a bid to prevent Menem's return to the presidency. Menem won a plurality in the first round of the presidential election but, fearing that he would lose in the required runoff election, he resigned; Kirchner became president as a result.

Kirchner took office on 25 May 2003. Roberto Lavagna, credited with the economic recovery during Duhalde's presidency, was retained as minister of economy and continued his economic policies. Argentina negotiated a swap of defaulted debt and repaid the International Monetary Fund. The National Institute of Statistics and Census intervened to underestimate growing inflation. Several Supreme Court judges resigned while fearing impeachment, and new judges were appointed. The amnesty for crimes committed during the Dirty War in enforcing the full-stop and due-obedience laws and the presidential pardons were repealed and declared unconstitutional. This led to new trials for the military who served during the 1970s. Argentina increased its integration with other Latin American countries, discontinuing its automatic alignment with the United States dating to the 1990s. The 2005 midterm elections were a victory for Kirchner, and signaled the end of Duhalde's supremacy in Buenos Aires Province.

Instead of seeking reelection, Kirchner stepped aside in 2007 in support of his wife, who was elected president. He participated in Operation Emmanuel to release FARC hostages, and was narrowly defeated in the 2009 midterm election for deputy of Buenos Aires Province. Kirchner was appointed Secretary General of UNASUR in 2010. He and his wife were involved (either directly or through their close aides) in the 2013 political scandal known as the Route of the K-Money, even though no judicial investigation ever found any proof of wrongdoing by Néstor or Cristina Kirchner. Kirchner died of cardiac arrest on 27 October 2010 at age 60 and received a state funeral.

== Early life ==
Kirchner was born on 25 February 1950, in Río Gallegos, Santa Cruz, a federal territory at the time. His father, Néstor Carlos Kirchner, of German-Swiss descent, met the Chilean María Juana Ostoich Dragnic, of Croatian descent, by telegraphy. They had three children: Néstor, Alicia, and María Cristina. Néstor was part of the third generation of Kirchners living in the city. As a result of pertussis, he developed strabismus at an early age; however, he refused medical treatment because he considered his eye part of his self-image. When Kirchner was in high school he briefly considered becoming a teacher, but poor diction hampered him; he was also unsuccessful at basketball.

Kirchner moved to La Plata in 1969 to study law at the National University. During this period, the decline of the Argentine Revolution, the return of former president Juan Perón from exile, the election of Héctor Cámpora as president, his resignation and the election of Perón, and the beginning of the Dirty War had led to severe political turmoil. Kirchner joined the University Federation for the National Revolution (FURN), a political student group whose relationship with the Montoneros guerrillas is a matter of debate. Kirchner was not a leader of the group. He was present at the Ezeiza massacre, in which right-wing Peronist snipers opened fire on a celebration of Juan Perón's return at the Ezeiza International Airport. He was also present at the expulsion of Montoneros from Plaza de Mayo. Although Kirchner met many members of the Montoneros, he was not a member of the group. By the time the Montoneros were outlawed by Perón, he had left FURN.

In 1974, Kirchner met Cristina Fernández, three years his junior, and they quickly fell in love. They were married after a courtship limited to six months by the political turmoil in the country. At the civil ceremony, Kirchner's friends sang the Peronist song "Los Muchachos Peronistas". He graduated a year later, returned to Patagonia with Cristina, and established a law firm with fellow attorney Domingo Ortiz de Zarate. Cristina joined the firm in 1979. By the time of Kirchner's graduation and move to Patagonia, Juan Perón had died, his vice president and wife, Isabel Perón, had become president. Isabel Perón was unseated by a coup d'état which installed a military government. The Kirchners worked for banks and financial groups which filed foreclosures, since the Central Bank's 1050 ruling had raised mortgage loan interest rates, and also acquired 21 real-estate lots for a low price when they were about to be auctioned. Their law firm defended military personnel accused of committing crimes during said war. Forced disappearances were common during the Dirty War, but unlike other lawyers of the time the Kirchners never signed a habeas corpus. Julio César Strassera, prosecutor in the 1985 Trial of the Juntas case against the military, criticized the Kirchners' lack of legal actions against the military, and considered their later interest in the issue a form of hypocrisy.

The Dirty War eventually ended, and the National Reorganization Process allowed political activity in preparation for a return to democracy. Kirchner led one of the three internal factions of the local Justicialist Party (PJ), but Peronist Arturo Puricelli prevailed in the primary elections. Kirchner founded the Ateneo Juan Domingo Perón organization, which supported deposed president Isabel Perón and promoted political dialogue with the military. Cristina Fernández became an attorney of the PJ in Santa Cruz, with the help of Rafael Flores, a former friend from the FURN. Raúl Alfonsín, who was running for president for the Radical Civic Union (UCR), denounced an agreement between the military and the Peronist unions which sought an amnesty for the military. Kirchner organized a rally on behalf of Rodolfo Ponce, a union leader mentioned by Alfonsín in his denouncement. Alfonsín won the 1983 presidential election, and Puricelli was elected governor of Santa Cruz. Puricelli sought to unify the local Peronist movement by adding members of the other factions into his government, and appointed Kirchner president of the provincial social-welfare fund.

Kirchner quickly expanded the activities and scope of his office, building a parallel state. This soon started a conflict with Puricelli. Instead of being fired, Kirchner resigned and accused the governor of reducing the funds for social welfare. He ran for mayor of Río Gallegos in 1987 and won by the slim margin of 110 votes. Kirchner's friend, Rudy Ulloa Igor, helped him to victory by registering some groups of Chilean immigrants to vote (immigrants were allowed to vote in mayoral elections), and persuading them to vote for Kirchner. Julio de Vido and Carlos Zannini began working with Kirchner at this time. Kirchner used the state-owned media to promote his activities. The Peronist Ricardo del Val was elected governor that year, and the province was impacted by inflation in 1989. Kirchner became the main opponent of del Val, who was impeached and removed from office in 1990 due to the inflation crisis.

== Governor of Santa Cruz ==
Kirchner ran for governor of Santa Cruz in 1991. Although he received only 30 percent of the vote, below the 36 percent of the UCR, he was elected due to the Ley de Lemas that added the votes for the Peronist faction of Puricelli to his own. When Kirchner took office, Santa Cruz was experiencing an economic crisis, with high unemployment and a budget deficit equal to 1.2 billion pesos, which amounted to an equal number of U.S. dollars because of the Convertibility plan. He expanded the number of provincial Supreme Court justices from three members to five and appointed three judges loyal to him; this gave him control of the provincial judiciary. Kirchner was criticized for preventing the investigation of corruption cases. Santa Cruz received 535 million pesos in oil royalties in 1993, which Kirchner deposited in a foreign bank. He was elected to the Constituent Assembly which drafted the 1994 amendment of the Argentine Constitution proposed by the Peronist president Carlos Menem. Kirchner voted against the amendment that would allow the reelection of the president, which was approved. Locally, he proposed an amendment to the provincial constitution authorizing indefinite reelection of the governor. Menem and Kirchner were reelected to their respective offices in 1995. Kirchner established a faction in the PJ opposing Menem's neoliberal economic policies, but Eduardo Duhalde, governor of the populous Buenos Aires province, ignored him and rallied a stronger opposition to Menem within the PJ.

The number of state workers grew from 12,000 to 70,000 during Kirchner's administration. The creation of private-sector jobs in the province was minimal, and private companies were driven away. A local journalist interviewed by journalist Jorge Lanata said that this placed de facto restrictions on economic freedom and allowed Kirchner to control the population. Most available jobs were in public works.

With Menem constitutionally restricted from running for a third presidential term, Duhalde ran for president in 1999. Kirchner sided with Duhalde in his dispute with Menem and sought reelection as governor of Santa Cruz. The PJ was defeated on the national level by the radical Fernando de la Rúa, who became president. Kirchner was reelected, despite the growth of the UCR in the province. Following an economic crisis, De la Rúa resigned two years later during the December 2001 riots. The Congress appointed Adolfo Rodríguez Saá, governor of San Luis, as interim president. When Rodríguez Saá also resigned, Duhalde was appointed president. He was the politician with the highest legitimacy to be appointed president, as he had placed second in the 1999 elections and won the 2001 legislative elections in the Buenos Aires province, the district of Argentina with the largest population. He slowly restored the economy and hastened the presidential election when two piqueteros were killed during a demonstration. However, the provincial elections were held on their original dates.

== 2003 presidential election ==
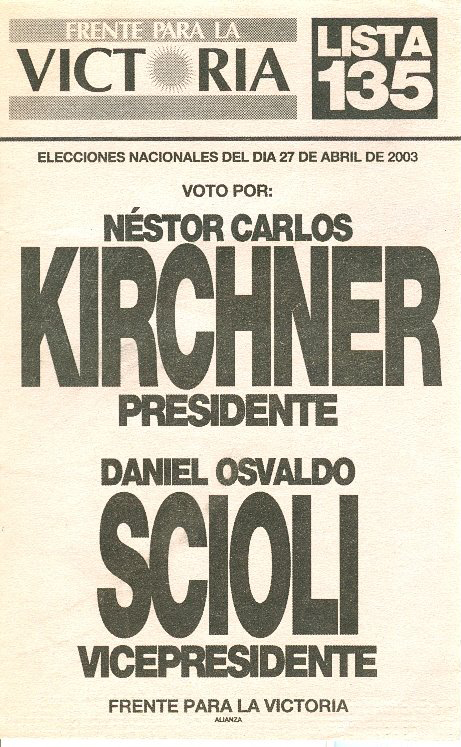
Presidential ballot of the Néstor Kirchner – Daniel Scioli ticket

Carlos Menem ran for a new term as president in 2003, and Eduardo Duhalde tried to prevent it. Instead of holding primary elections within the PJ, the 2003 elections used a variant of the Ley de Lemas. All the Peronist candidates were allowed to run in the general election, using their own tickets. Although Kirchner ran for president with Duhalde's support, he was not the president's first choice. Trying to prevent a third term for Menem, Duhalde approached Santa Fe governor Carlos Reutemann and Córdoba governor José Manuel de la Sota; Reutemann declined, and De la Sota did not run because he was insufficiently popular. Duhalde also unsuccessfully approached Mauricio Macri, Adolfo Rodríguez Saá, Felipe Solá, and Roberto Lavagna, all of whom refused to run. Duhalde initially resisted supporting Kirchner, fearing that Kirchner would ignore him if elected. Kirchner run on the Front for Victory ticket, one of the several fronts put up by the PJ. Since Kirchner was identified with the centre-left, Duhalde appointed the centre-right Daniel Scioli as his vice-presidential candidate. Only a handful of Peronist governors supported either candidate; most remained neutral, awaiting the election to forge a relationship with the victor.

The general election was held on 27 April. Menem won the first round with 24.5 percent of the vote, followed by Kirchner with 22.2 percent. The conservative Ricardo López Murphy finished third, substantially behind the two main candidates. Since Menem was well short of the threshold required to win, a runoff election was scheduled for 18 May. By this time, however, Menem's public image had deteriorated, and polls showed Kirchner receiving 60 to 70 percent of the vote. To avoid a humiliating defeat, Menem pulled out of the runoff in a move criticized by the other candidates. The judiciary declined requests for a new election and refused to sanction a runoff election between Kirchner and López Murphy, although López Murphy said he would not have participated in any event. The election was validated by the Congress, and Kirchner became president on 25 May 2003. Kirchner's 22.2 percent is the lowest vote percentage ever recorded for an Argentine president in a free election.

Local elections were held in October. The mayor of Buenos Aires, Aníbal Ibarra, was reelected in a runoff against Mauricio Macri. Neither were Peronists, but Ibarra supported Kirchner and Macri was supported by Duhalde. Duhalde remained an influential figure in the Buenos Aires province; his ally Felipe Solá was elected governor by a landslide, and the PJ received its highest number of deputies since 1983 and won mayoral elections in several cities lost to the UCR in 1999. The three leading candidates in the Buenos Aires province were all Peronists. Victories in the other provinces gave the PJ control of the Congress, and three-quarters of Argentina's governors were Peronists. According to journalist Mariano Grondona, Argentine politics had become a dominant-party system.

== Presidency ==
=== First days ===
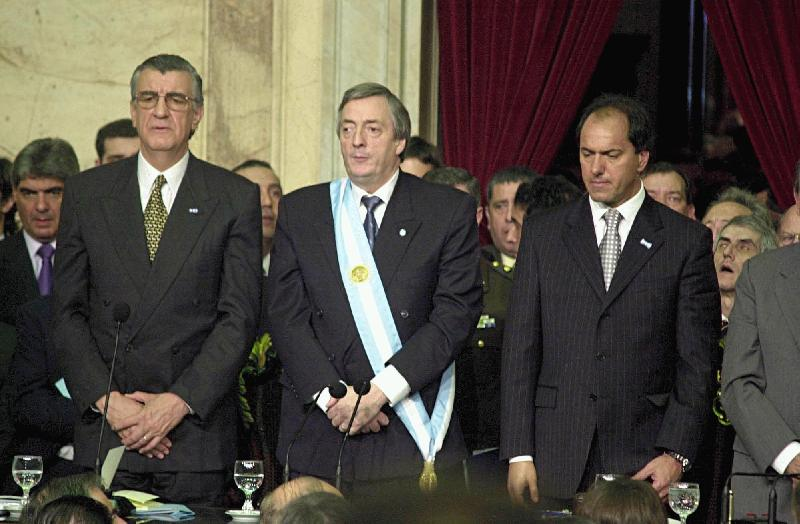
Néstor Kirchner (center) during the 2003 presidential inauguration

Kirchner took office as president of Argentina on 25 May 2003. Contrary to tradition, the ceremony was held at the Palace of the Argentine National Congress rather than Casa Rosada. He announced that he would spearhead change on many issues, from politics to culture. The ceremony was attended by the provincial governors, Supreme Court president Julio Nazareno, the heads of the armed forces, and Cuban leader Fidel Castro. Raúl Alfonsín was the only former president in attendance. Kirchner walked to the Casa Rosada along Avenida de Mayo, breaking with protocol to get close to the people, and was accidentally hit in the head with a camera.

As he was elected with a small percentage of the vote, Kirchner sought to increase his political clout and public image. He sought political allies in all political parties, not just the PJ. The Radicales K supported him from within the UCR. This practice of reaching out to multiple parties became known as "Transversalism". Striking an "anti-establishment image", Kirchner set about creating "a sense of political renewal" in Argentina. He retained four members of Duhalde's cabinet. Economy Minister Roberto Lavagna, credited with the economic recovery, was kept to ensure that Kirchner maintained the economic policies laid down during the previous administration. Ginés González García stayed as Minister of Health. Anibal Fernandez was moved to the Ministry of the Interior and José Pampuro to the Defense Ministry. Kirchner brought in four members of his cabinet from his days as governor of Santa Cruz. Alberto Fernández, who organized his political campaign, was appointed chief of the cabinet of ministers. Sergio Acevedo was placed in charge of intelligence. Julio de Vido was appointed Minister of Federal Planning, an office similar to his provincial one. Since the appointment of relatives was not unusual in Argentina, Kirchner's appointment of his sister Alicia as Minister of Social Development was uncontroversial. Chancellor Rafael Bielsa was from another political party, FREPASO.

=== Relations with the judiciary ===
The Argentine judiciary had been unpopular since the presidency of Carlos Menem, most of whose judicial appointments were based on loyalty; his judiciary was known as the "automatic majority". Kirchner sought to remove the most controversial judges and organized the impeachment of Supreme Court president Julio Nazareno, who chose to resign. Judge Adolfo Vázquez also resigned before impeachment, citing personal reasons. Judges Eduardo Moline O'Connor and Guillermo López also resigned under similar circumstances. The vacancies were well received by the public, boosting Kirchner's popularity.

Kirchner arranged a new system to appoint judges. Instead of simply proposing a new judge candidate to the Congress, the presidency first released names of a number of potential candidates, who were then evaluated by several non-governmental organizations, who assessed if the candidate was suitable as a judge. The Ministry of Justice and Human Rights compiled all the support and criticism, and the president then decided which candidate would be proposed to the Congress, which made the final decision, as under the previous system. Raúl Zaffaroni, a former FREPASO politician, was the first judicial appointment under the new system. He was followed by Elena Highton de Nolasco, the first woman appointed to the Supreme Court. The appointment of Carmen Argibay (another female judge) was controversial, since Argibay was an atheist and a supporter of legal abortion. The judges held liberal views on criminal justice, countering social demands for harsher, pro-victim policies after the murder of Axel Blumberg. However, the new Supreme Court had little political power, as the national government ignored all rulings that were not favorable.

Following the murder of 18-year-old Alfredo Marcenac in Belgrano, Buenos Aires, at the hands of serial shooter Martín Ríos, Kirchner sent a bill to Congress to approve a plan of national disarmament, which was eventually passed upon pressure from civil society in the aftermath of the Belgrano serial shootings and, previously, of the Carmen de Patagones school shooting.

=== Economic policy ===
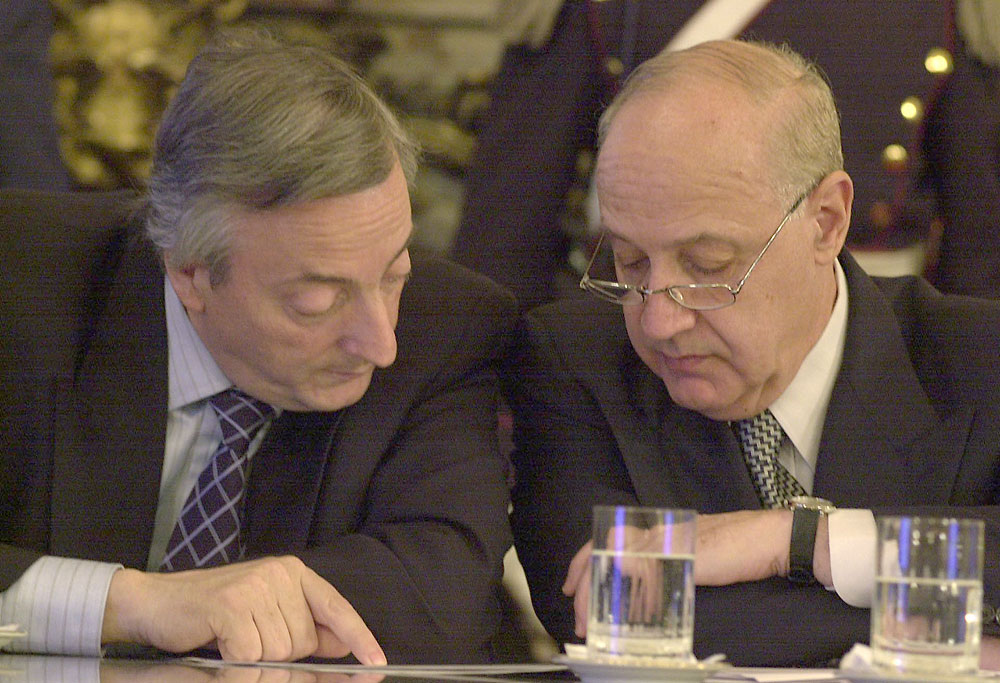
Kirchner and Roberto Lavagna, Minister of Economy during most of his presidency

The pillars of the economic plan were trade and fiscal budget surpluses and a high exchange rate for the United States dollar. The surplus was increased by taxes levied during de la Rúa's presidency and the devaluation which occurred during the Duhalde administration. Kirchner sought to rebuild the Argentine industrial base, public works and public services, renegotiating the operation of public services privatized by Carlos Menem and owned by foreign companies. His policies were accompanied by a nationalist rhetoric sympathetic to the poor. However, despite the financial prosperity, there was no significant decrease in the number of people living in poverty, which was 8 to 10 million people, or almost 25% of the country.

Kirchner and Lavagna negotiated a swap of defaulted national debt in 2005, a write-down to one-third of the original debt. Kirchner refused a structural adjustment program, and instead made a single payment to the IMF with Central Bank reserves. Although the economy grew at an eight-percent annual rate during Kirchner's term, much of its growth was due to favorable international conditions rather than Argentine policies. Argentina was benefited by the increase of the international price of soybean and other foods. However, some argued that this economic growth can also be attributed to Kirchners policies to increase domestic demand. Foreign investment remained low because of the Argentine hostility towards the IMF, the U.S. and the United Kingdom, the re-nationalization of privatized companies (such as the water supply, managed by the French company Suez), diplomatic isolation and state interventionism. The energy sector suffered, and lack of investment reduced energy reserves during the 2000s.

Lavagna proposed to slow economic growth and control inflation. Kirchner rejected this, promoting wage increases to reduce economic inequality and extending unemployment insurance and other types of social welfare. Public services such as public transportation, electricity, gas and water supply were subsidized and kept at low prices. Food industries were subsidized as well. The subsidies eventually expanded to several uncommon areas. This increased the economic activity, but also increased inflation and reduced the private investment in those areas. Unable to control inflation, the government influenced the National Institute of Statistics and Census of Argentina, which under-reported it, as well as poverty (which was calculated with the inflation figures). The superpowers law, sanctioned during the crisis, was prorogated and eventually made permanent in 2006; this law allowed the president to rearrange the budget with supervision from the Congress. Kirchner sought to win over the Argentine Workers' Central Union and leaders of more moderate piquetero factions to reduce the chances of strikes and protests. Their usual system of protest (blocking streets) made them highly unpopular. However, Kirchner refused to suppress the piquetero demonstrations to avoid the risk of further violence.

Lavagna refused to run for senator in the 2005 midterm elections and criticized the overpricing of public works managed by Minister of Federal Planning Julio de Vido. As a result, Kirchner asked Lavagna to resign. Finance secretary Guillermo Nielsen, who managed the debt restructuring, also resigned. Felisa Miceli, head of Banco de la Nación Argentina, replaced Lavagna as Minister of Economy. Miceli resigned in 2007, months before the presidential elections, because of a scandal over a bag with a large amount of money which was found in her office bathroom. She was replaced by Secretary of Industry Miguel Gustavo Peirano.

=== Foreign policy ===
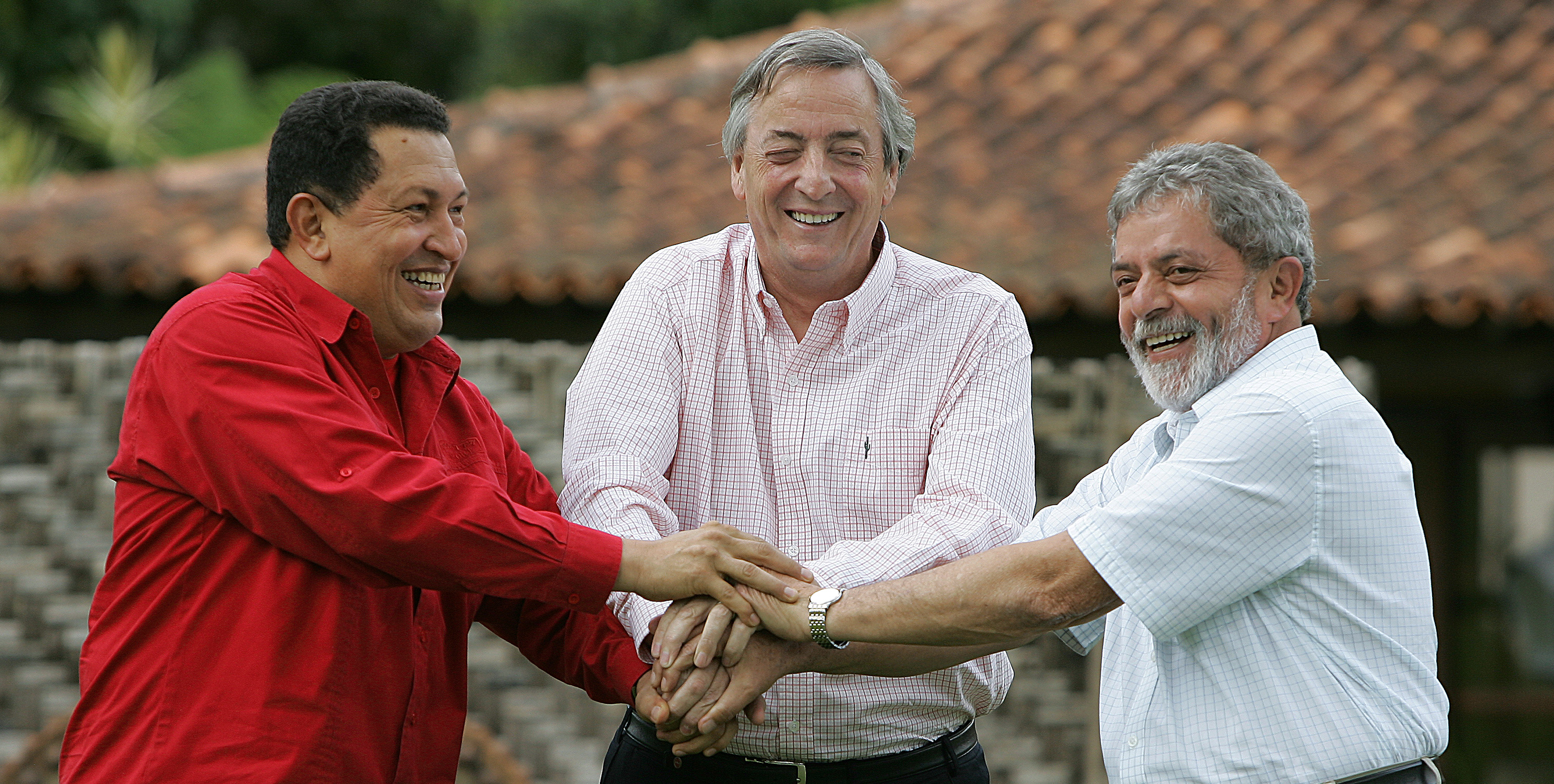
Kirchner and Presidents Hugo Chávez of Venezuela and Luiz Inácio Lula da Silva of Brazil at a 2006 summit in Brasília

Kirchner took a pragmatic approach to Argentine foreign policy, and Argentina–United States relations did not continue the special relations of the 1990s. Chancellor Rafael Bielsa called the relationship between the countries "cooperation without cohabitation" in contrast to that of the Menem era, which was known as "carnal relations". Kirchner opposed the proposed Free Trade Area of the Americas, as it was based on majority rule among all the countries of the Americas, whereas he preferred a proportional representation system that would have given the Mercosur bloc more influence. The 4th Summit of the Americas, hosted in Mar del Plata, ended with violent protests against U.S. President George W. Bush; negotiations stalled, and the FTAA was not implemented. Kirchner told the United Nations that, although he opposed terrorism, he did not support the war on terror. He refused to receive U.S. Secretary of Defense Donald Rumsfeld, and sent forces to the United Nations Stabilisation Mission in Haiti.

Kirchner sought increased integration with other Latin American countries. He revived and tried to strengthen the Mercosur trade bloc and improved relations with Brazil, but without automatically aligning with that country, the regional power of South America. The president tried to keep a middle ground between Brazil and Venezuela, since he considered the Brazilian Luiz Inácio Lula da Silva too conservative, and the Venezuelan Hugo Chávez too anti-American. Kirchner worked with left-wing presidents Lula, Chilean Ricardo Lagos, Chávez, Fidel Castro from Cuba and Evo Morales from Bolivia.

=== 2005 midterm elections ===
Kirchner soon distanced himself from Duhalde, removing those close to the former president from the government to reduce his political influence. He also sought supporters across the social and political spectrum to counter Duhalde's influence in the party. Although Duhalde was not initially against Kirchner, Kirchner tried to prevent the presence of alternative leaderships within the PJ. However, they put their differences behind them during the October 2003 legislative elections. Their dispute was fanned by the political weight of Buenos Aires province (the most populous in Argentina, with almost 40 percent of the national vote), and continued through the 2005 midterm elections. Without consensus in the PJ for a candidate for senator in the Buenos Aires province, both leaders had their wives run for office: Hilda González de Duhalde for the PJ and Cristina Fernández de Kirchner for the Front for Victory, which contested the election as a different party. Cristina Kirchner won the election. As in 2003, the elections were defined by Peronist factions; the opposition parties could not put up a united national front. The victory gave Kirchner the confidence to remove Lavagna, Rafael Bielsa, Jose Pampuro, and Alicia Kirchner from his cabinet and replace them with ministers who, though less well-known, had perspectives closer to his own.

=== Human rights policy ===
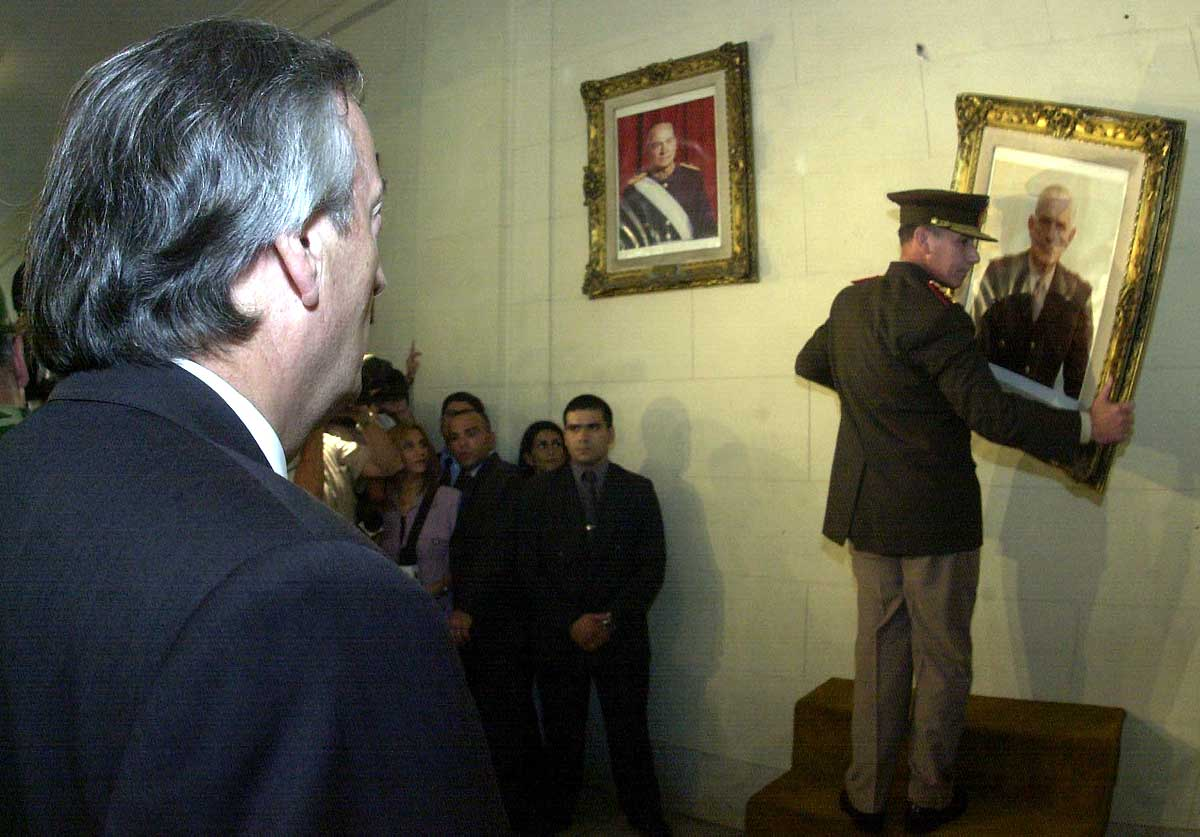
Kirchner oversees the removal of military portraits from the National Reorganization Process at the National Military College.

Although the Dirty War ended in the eighties, Kirchner considered it an unresolved issue. In his inaugural speech, he supported human rights organizations which sought the incarceration of the military connected with the National Reorganization Process. He also ordered the top military leadership to retire. Kirchner sent a bill to the Congress to annul the full stop law and the Law of Due Obedience, which had halted trials of the military for crimes related to the Dirty War. The laws had been repealed in 1998, but that repeal had little legal significance, as only an annulment would reopen the cases. Although this initiative was opposed by Duhalde and Scioli, most legislators considered it a symbolic gesture since the laws' constitutionality would be decided by the Supreme Court. Both laws were annulled by the Congress in August 2003, and many cases were reopened as a result. The Supreme Court declared the laws, and Menem's presidential pardons, unconstitutional in 2005. Jorge Julio López, witness in a trial of police officer Miguel Etchecolatz, disappeared in 2006. This caused a national scandal, as it was suspected that he was disappeared to intimidate other witnesses in the upcoming trials, and the government was unable to locate him.

Kirchner changed the extradition policy, allowing extradition for people prosecuted abroad and not facing charges in Argentina. He also supported the requests by human rights organizations to turn the former detention centers into memorials for the disappeared. Argentina became a signatory of the UN Convention on the Non-Applicability of Statutory Limitations to War Crimes and Crimes Against Humanity in 2003. A creative interpretation of the convention by the courts allowed them to circumvent the statutory limitations to crimes committed decades in the past, and also the ex post facto applicability of laws that were not in force at the time of the crimes. The Mothers of the Plaza de Mayo held their final demonstration in 2006, believing that Kirchner, unlike previous presidents, was not their enemy. They became political allies of Kirchner, who placed them in prominent locations during his speeches, and the group became a powerful NGO. He appointed Nilda Garré, who had been a political prisoner during the Dirty War, as the country's first woman Minister of Defense.

Although Kirchner repudiated the military forces who participated in the Dirty War, he overlooked the guerrilla movements of the time. The government ignored the 30th anniversary of the ERP attack on the tank regiment in Azul and the 15th anniversary of the 1989 attack on La Tablada barracks. According to Rosendo Fraga, Kirchner downplayed the presence of terrorist organizations during the Dirty War. Guerrillas who committed suicide or who were executed by their own organizations were re-categorized in 2006 as victims of state terrorism, and their survivors were compensated by the state. However, victims of the guerrillas were not compensated. Journalist Ceferino Reato said that the Kirchners sought to replace the theory of the two demons, which blamed the Dirty War on both the military and the guerrillas, with a "theory of angels and demons", which blamed only the military.

== After the presidency ==
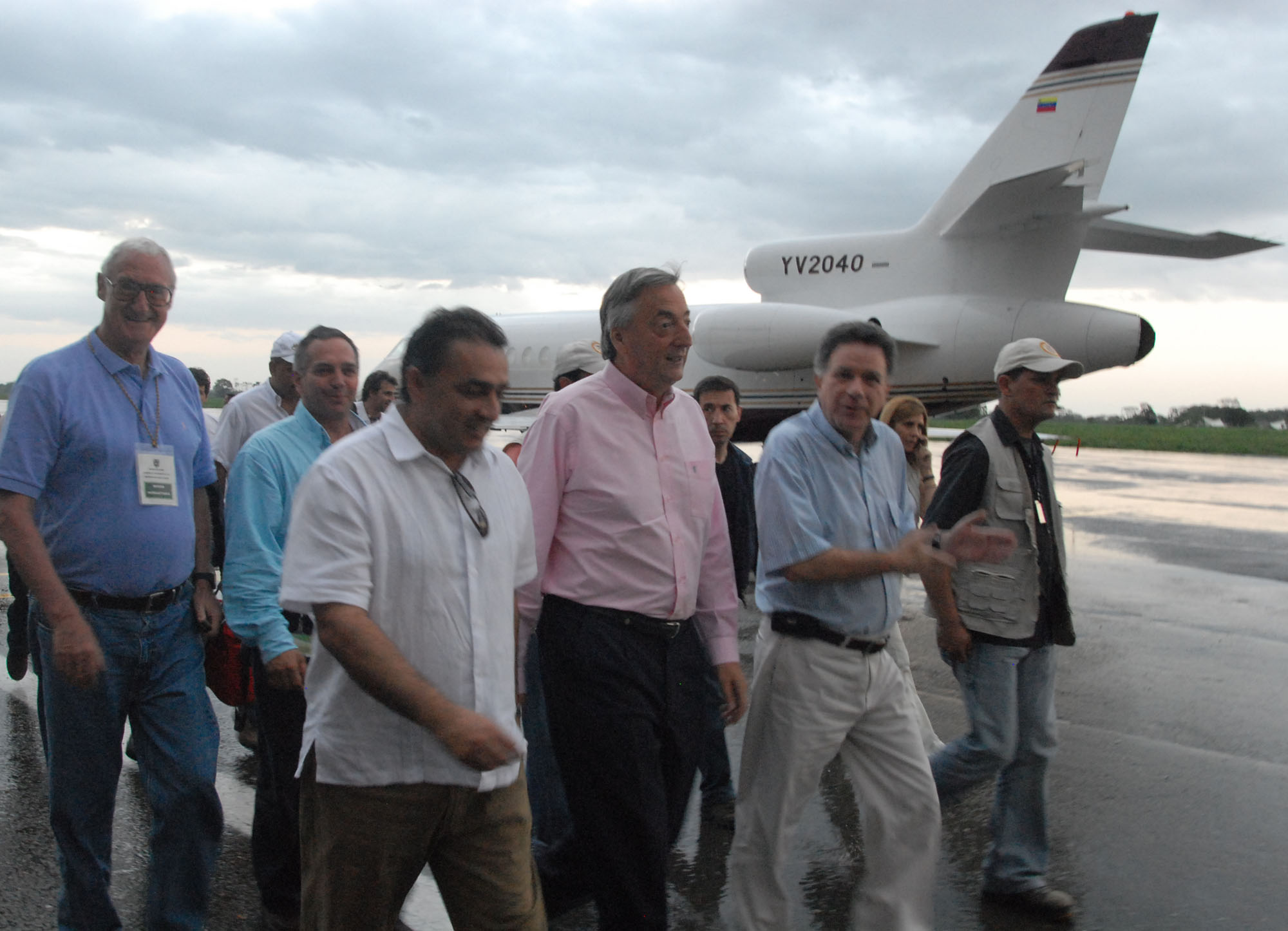
Kirchner returns to Argentina after the unsuccessful Operation Emmanuel.

Kirchner did not run for a reelection in the 2007 presidential elections. His wife, Cristina Fernández de Kirchner, ran instead. Media observers suspected that Kirchner stepped down as president to circumvent the term limit, swapping roles with his wife. To bolster his wife's prospects, Kirchner pressured the national statistics agency to fudge economic data to make the economy appear in better shape than it was. Cristina Kirchner was elected, and Néstor Kirchner became First Gentleman. He remained highly influential during his wife's term, supervising the economy and leading the PJ. Their marriage has been compared with those of Juan and Eva Perón and Bill and Hillary Clinton.

Kirchner participated in Operation Emmanuel in Colombia in December 2007, which sought to release a group of FARC hostages, including Colombian politician Íngrid Betancourt. Kirchner returned to Argentina after negotiations failed. The hostages were freed a year later during Operation Jaque, a covert operation by the Colombian military.

Néstor Kirchner played an active role in the 2008 government conflict with the agricultural sector, when Cristina Kirchner introduced a new sliding-scale taxation system for agricultural exports that raised custom taxes to soybean exports to 44%. At that time, he became president of the Justicialist Party and publicly supported his wife in the conflict; Kirchner accused the agricultural sector of attempting a coup d'état. He spoke in support of a bill to set the taxes by law at a demonstration at the Palace of the Argentine National Congress. Many senators who had supported the government rejected the proposal, and the voting was tied 36–36. Vice-president Julio Cobos, president of the Chamber of Senators, cast the decisive vote in opposition to the measure.

In the June 2009 legislative elections, Kirchner was defeated by Francisco de Narváez of the Union PRO coalition for National Deputy of Buenos Aires Province. The Front for Victory was defeated in the Buenos Aires, Santa Fe and Córdoba, and the Kirchners lost the Congressional majority. Voter disenchantment with the Kirchners was caused by inflation, crime and the previous year's agricultural conflict, which cost them rural support. The Kirchners pushed a media law through during the Congress' lame-duck session. The Kirchners described it as an antitrust law to limit media ownership, but critics considered instead that it was used to reduce the freedom of the press.

Kirchner was nominated by Ecuador for Secretary General of the Union of South American Nations (UNASUR), but was rejected by Uruguay when Uruguay and Argentina were involved in a pulp-mill dispute. The dispute was resolved in 2010; new Uruguayan president José Mujica supported Kirchner, who was unanimously elected UNASUR's first secretary-general at a member-state summit in Buenos Aires on 4 May. Kirchner successfully mediated the 2010 Colombia–Venezuela diplomatic crisis.

== Style and ideology ==
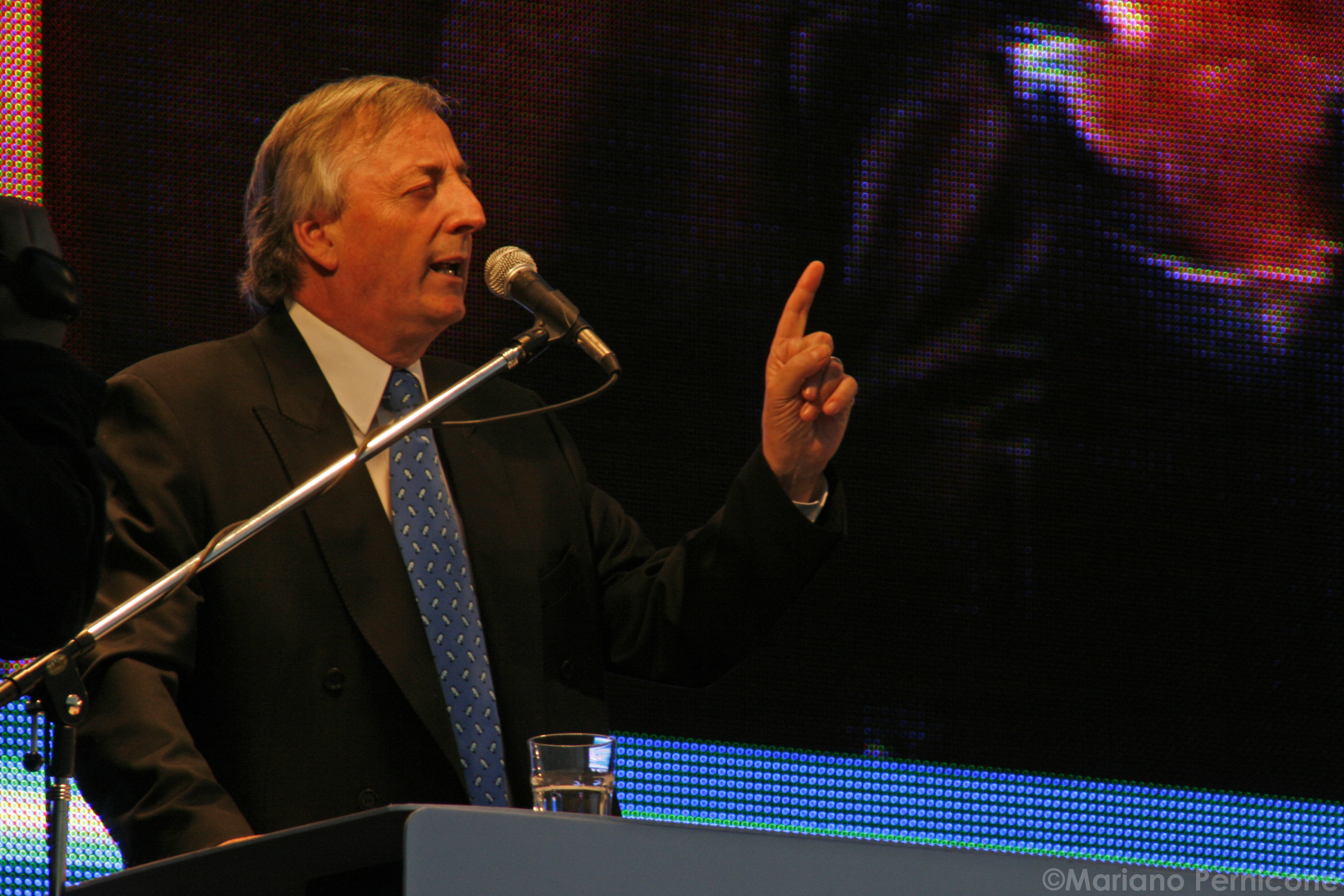
Kirchner delivering a speech

Kirchner was often labelled a left-wing and progressive president, with the cultural critic Alejandro Kaufman stating that Kirchner was "an Argentine social democrat: a centre-left Peronist", who had been elected on a "moderate-progressive" platform; however, that assessment is relative. Although he was to the left of previous Argentine presidents from Raúl Alfonsín to Eduardo Duhalde and contemporary Brazilian president Luiz Inácio Lula da Silva, he was right of other Latin American presidents such as Hugo Chávez and Fidel Castro. Kirchner's nationalist approach to the Falkland Islands sovereignty dispute was closer to the right, and he did not consider left-wing policies such as the socialization of production or the nationalization of public services, which were privatized during the Menem presidency. He did not attempt to modify church–state relations or reduce the armed forces. Kirchner's economic views were influenced by his tenure in the government of Santa Cruz: a province rich in oil, gas, fish and tourism, with an economy focused on the primary sector. Usually avoiding long-term policies, he moved left or right according to circumstances.

A Peronist, Kirchner handled political power as Peronist leaders have traditionally done. He made frequent use of controversies with other political or social forces and the polarization of public opinion, which became characteristic of his political style. This strategy was used against the financial sector, the military and police, foreign countries, international bodies, newspapers, and Duhalde himself with varying degrees of success. Kirchner sought to generate an image contrasting with those of former presidents Carlos Menem and Fernando de la Rúa. Menem was seen as frivolous and De la Rúa as doubtful, so Kirchner tried to be seen as serious and determined.

Kirchner sought to concentrate political power, and the emergency superpowers law giving discretionary powers to the president to change the national budget was periodically renewed. The Front for Victory (conceived as a lema of the PJ) became a political alliance of the PJ, pro-Kirchner factions in other parties, and minor left-wing parties. The progressivist population, lacking leadership since the crisis which discredited the UCR, also supported the new coalition. Most Peronists simply defected to the new party, and the end of the economic crisis and the discretionary control of state finances allowed Kirchner to discipline his allies and co-opt his rivals. As a consequence, the Congress became compliant and the opposition was unable to present a credible alternative to the government. In addition to concentrating power, Kirchner micromanaged most government tasks or assigned them to trusted aides regardless of cabinet hierarchy. He managed relations with the United States and Brazil, leaving relations with Bolivia and Venezuela in the hands of Minister of Federal Planning Julio de Vido. There were no cabinet meetings during Kirchner's presidency, rare in a national government; this may have been influenced by his governance of Santa Cruz, a sparsely populated province in which the cabinet was of little use and decisions were primarily made by the governor.

Kirchner had a disregard for bilateral relations whenever these interfered with his domestic policies. As such he cut down gas export to Chile in 2004 despite Chilean protests, clashed with Uruguay over the environmental impact of a planned pulp mill and had trade disputes with Brazil. During his tenure Kirchner left in the lurch numerous World leaders, including President of Vietnam Trần Đức Lương. Kirchner was a staunch opponent of capital punishment and manifested his posture in the aftermath of the execution of Saddam Hussein, when, while acknowledging the crimes committed by Hussein, he called for the abolishment of capital punishment, condemning the execution.

== Allegations of embezzlement ==
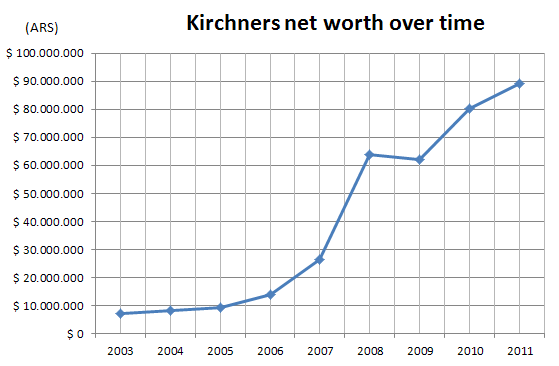
The Kirchners' net worth

The Skanska case occurred during Kirchner's presidency, during which several members of de Vido's ministry were accused of bribery in requests for tender for pipeline construction, based on a tape recording of Skanska employees discussing the bribes. The case was closed in 2011, when it was ruled that the tape was not acceptable evidence and there was no overpricing. It was reopened in 2016 (with Cristina Fernández de Kirchner no longer president), and the tape was accepted as evidence.

The Kirchners' net worth, as reported to the AFIP revenue service, increased by 4,500 percent between 1995 and 2010. A substantial increase occurred in 2008, from 26.5 million to 63.5 million Argentine pesos, due to the sale of long-owned land, hotel rentals, and time deposits in Argentine pesos and U.S. dollars. They founded a business-consulting company, El Chapel and established the Hotesur SA and Los Sauces firms to manage their luxury hotels in El Calafate. The Kirchners expanded Comasa, a firm of which they had a 90-percent ownership. Their salaries as politicians were 3.62 percent of their total earnings.

Kirchner was tried for unjust enrichment in 2004, with the case focusing on the increase in his wealth from 1995 to 2003. The case was first heard by judge Juan José Galeano and moved to judge Julián Ercolini, who acquitted him in 2005. A new case involving both Kirchners was heard by judge Norberto Oyarbide, who acquitted them in 2010.

The TV program Periodismo para todos aired an investigation in 2013, detailing a case of embezzlement and an associated money trail involving the Kirchners and businessman Lázaro Báez. Báez received 95 percent of the requests for tender in Santa Cruz province since 2003, more than four billion pesos, and the scandal was known as the Route of the K-Money (Spanish: La ruta del dinero K). In the 2014 Hotesur scandal, a company owned by Báez rented more than 1,100 rooms per month at Kirchner family hotels even when they were unoccupied. A money-laundering scheme was suspected, funnelling public-works money to the Kirchner family.

In April 2016, Kirchner's secretary and confidant Daniel Muñoz (who died early that year) was identified in the Panama Papers as owner of real-estate investment firm Gold Black Limited. Company director Sergio Todisco was investigated by prosecutors who suspected that the company was used for money laundering. At the end of the year, judge Julián Ercolini indicted Cristina Fernández de Kirchner and several members of their cabinet, charging them with a criminal conspiracy that would have started when Néstor Kirchner first became president.

== Death ==
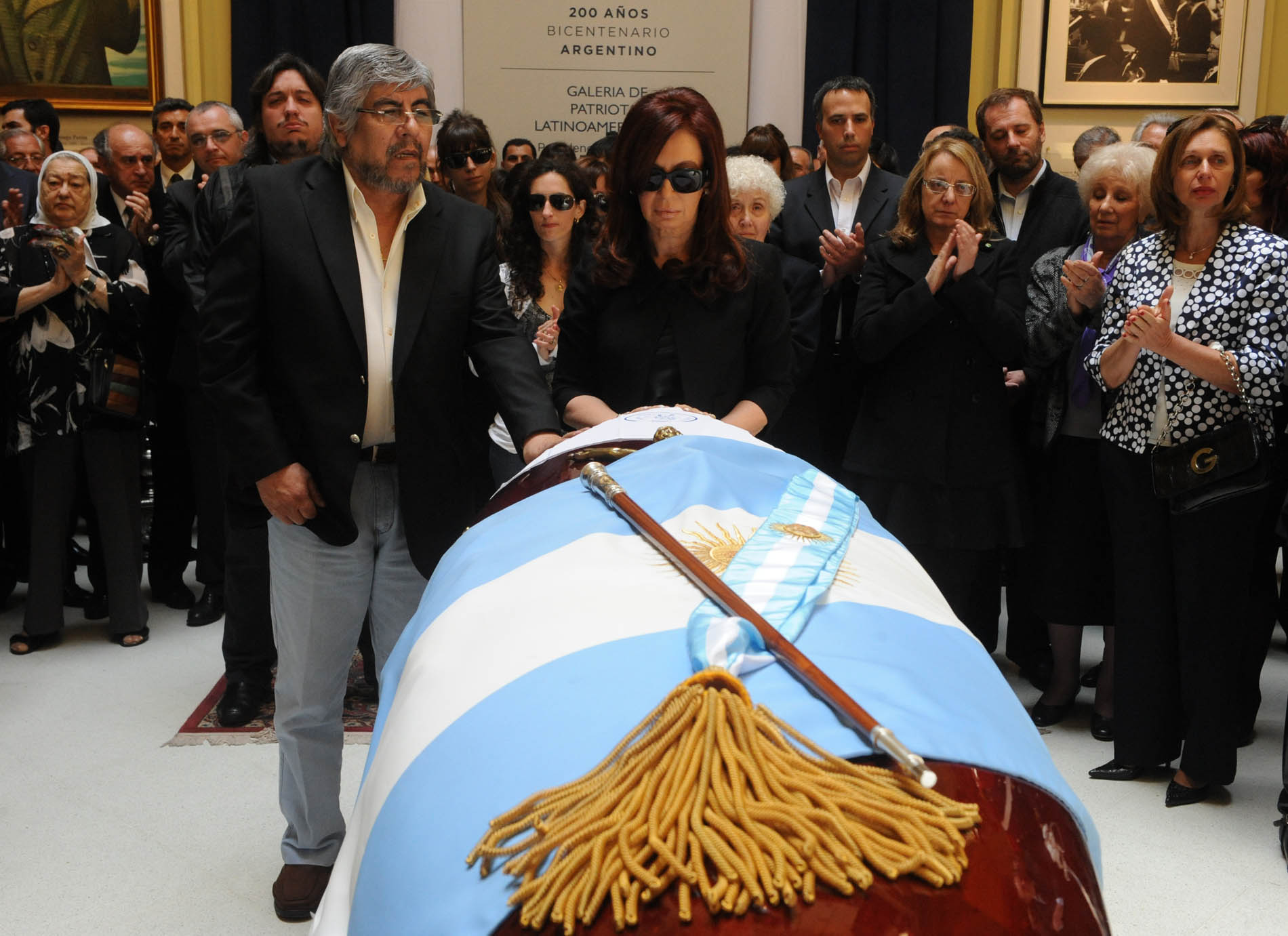
President Cristina Fernández de Kirchner and Hugo Moyano at Kirchner's funeral

Kirchner died on 27 October 2010, at the age of 60. The day was a national holiday for the INDEC to run a national census, so he was at home in El Calafate. Kirchner was rushed to a local hospital and was pronounced dead at 9:15 a.m. from cardiac arrest. He had undergone two medical procedures that year: surgery on his right carotid artery in February and an angioplasty in September. His death was a surprise for the Argentine population, to whom he had always represented his heart problems as not very serious.

His body was flown to the Casa Rosada for a state funeral, and three national days of mourning were declared. Kirchner's funeral was attended by thousands, despite heavy rain. According to media reports, 1,000 people per hour entered the Casa Rosada in groups of 100 to 150. Cristina Kirchner, dressed in mourning, stood next to the coffin. People brought candles, flags and flowers, some of which Cristina accepted personally.

Kirchner's death evoked international reactions moments after it was announced, with Brazil and Venezuela also declaring three national days of mourning. Colombian President Juan Manuel Santos and the Organization of American States declared a moment of silence, and U.S. president Barack Obama sent condolences. Attendees at Kirchner's funeral included Venezuela's Hugo Chávez and Brazil's Luiz Inácio Lula da Silva.

== Legacy ==
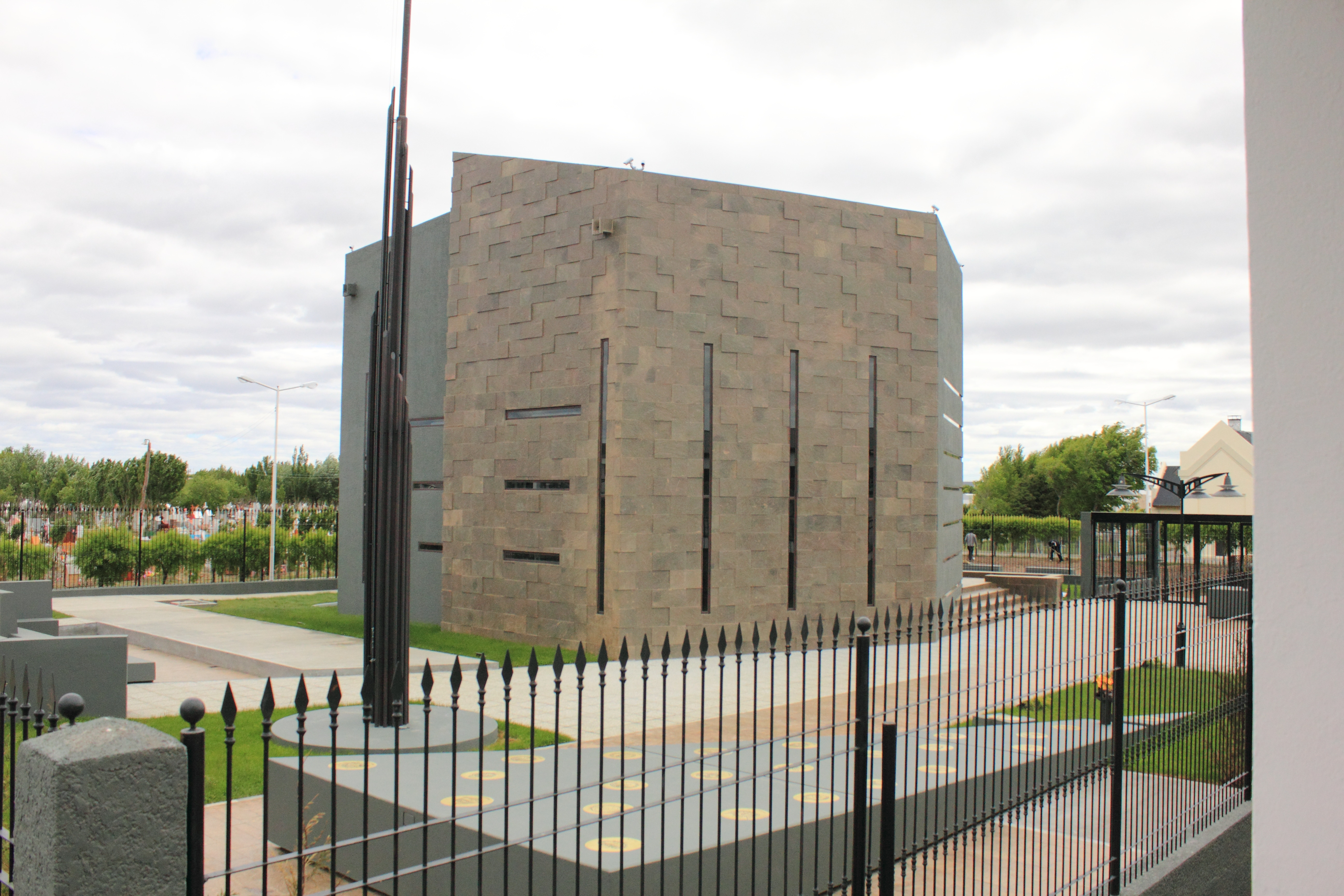
The Mausoleum of Néstor Kirchner in Río Gallegos, Santa Cruz, was built by Lázaro Báez.

Although Kirchner was known to have health problems, his death was unexpected, and had a great impact on the politics of Argentina. Kirchner died at an early age, while still being a highly influential figure in politics, despite not being president at the time. Presidents Manuel Quintana, Roque Sáenz Peña and Roberto María Ortiz died in office, but none of them had a political clout comparable to that of Kirchner. President Juan Perón had a similar power and died in office, but his death was not unexpected, as he had already reached the life expectancy of the time. Other figures of the history of Argentina who achieved great political clout, such as José de San Martín, Juan Manuel de Rosas, Julio Argentino Roca, Carlos Pellegrini and Hipólito Yrigoyen, all died when they were already retired from politics, or even abroad.

Initially, the death of Kirchner caused a power vacuum, as Cristina Fernández de Kirchner had ruled so far as a figurehead, while Néstor Kirchner still managed the government. She changed the style of the government making it more authoritarian, and more critical of the United States. She broke with allies of her husband, such as the union leader Hugo Moyano, and increased the political clout of the youth wing La Cámpora instead. She also relied on her public image more than her husband had. The popularity of the Kirchners had been in a decline at the time of Néstor's death, but after being widowed, Fernández de Kirchner's popularity increased greatly. As a result, she won the reelection in the 2011 general elections by a landslide.

The Relato K built a cult of personality around the figure of Kirchner. While in office, Cristina Fernández de Kirchner avoided referring to him by name, and talked instead about "He" or "Him", with emphasis on the pronoun and with a universally capitalized form. As in the English language, in the Spanish language this figure of speech is usually reserved to make reference to God. Kirchner was also compared with San Martín, in an attempt to raise him to a similar status as a national hero. This comparison was included, for instance, in an official video by the ministry of social welfare.

A month after his death many districts renamed streets, schools, neighbourhoods, institutions and other places after "Néstor Kirchner". Some noteworthy examples are the Néstor Kirchner Cultural Centre (formerly "Bicentennial Cultural Centre") and the second leg of the 2010–11 Argentine Primera División season. The change proved controversial in some cities, such as Caleta Olivia, where the renamed street was formerly named after the Falklands War veterans. A bill to rename a street after Kirchner was rejected in Apóstoles, Misiones. No renaming bill was even considered in Buenos Aires, as a previous law only allowed streets to be named after people who had died at least a decade before. The presidency of Mauricio Macri proposed a bill in 2016 to forbid any public places or institutions from being named after people unless they had died at least two decades before; if approved, all the state properties named after Kirchner would have to be renamed.

== Honours and awards ==
=== Foreign honours ===
Ribbon	Distinction	Country	Date	Reference
	Grand Collar of the Order of the Southern Cross	Brazil	26 November 2003	
	Knight Grand Cross of the Order of the Netherlands Lion	Netherlands	30 March 2006	
	Grand Collar of the Order of the Liberator	Venezuela	5 July 2006	

=== Honorary degrees ===
- China: Fudan University, 17 June 2004
- Argentina: National University of Entre Ríos, 16 December 2010 (posthumously)
- Argentina: National University of Lanús, 20 December 2010 (posthumously)

== See also ==
- List of heads of the executive by approval rating

== Notes ==
Political offices
Preceded by Jorge Marcelo Cepernic	Mayor of Rio Gallegos; 1987–1991	Succeeded by Alfredo Martínez
Preceded by Héctor Marcelino García	Governor of Santa Cruz; 1991–2003	Succeeded by Héctor Icazuriaga
Preceded by Eduardo Duhalde	President of Argentina; 2003–2007	Succeeded by Cristina Fernández de Kirchner
Party political offices
Preceded by Ramón Ruiz	President of the Justicialist Party; 2008–2009	Succeeded by Daniel Scioli
Preceded by Daniel Scioli	President of the Justicialist Party; 2009–2010	Succeeded by Daniel Scioli
Honorary titles
Preceded by Cristina Fernández de Kirchner as First Lady	First Gentleman of Argentina; 2007–2010	Vacant Title next held by Juliana Awada as First Lady
Diplomatic posts
Position established	Secretary General of the USAN; 2010	Succeeded by María Emma Mejía Vélez
