= Central Nacional de Inteligencia =

Central Nacional de Inteligencia (National Intelligence Center, CNI) was one of the many intelligence agencies of Argentina. Its main mission was to permanently assist and coordinate the functions and operations of all the Argentine intelligence services.

The CNI did not have an official facility, but instead worked on the SIDE building in Buenos Aires. It had delegates from all the Federal Police, Military, Ministry of Foreign Relations, and Ministry of Economy intelligence services.

In 2001, it was merged into the reorganized Secretaría de Inteligencia, which is now the head and director of the National Intelligence System and does the CNI's job.

== See also ==
- List of secretaries of intelligence of Argentina
- Argentine intelligence agencies
- National Intelligence System
- National Intelligence School
- Directorate of Judicial Surveillance
- National Directorate of Criminal Intelligence
- National Directorate of Strategic Military Intelligence
