= List of Argentine deputies, 2001–2003 =

This is list of members of the Argentine Chamber of Deputies from 10 December 2001 to 9 December 2003.

== Composition ==
=== By province ===
Province	Deputies	Population (2010)
Buenos Aires	70	15,625,084
Buenos Aires City	25	2,890,151
Catamarca	5	367,828
Chaco	7	1,053,466
Chubut	5	506,668
Córdoba	18	3,304,825
Corrientes	7	993,338
Entre Ríos	9	1,236,300
Formosa	5	527,895
Jujuy	6	672,260
La Pampa	5	316,940
La Rioja	5	331,847
Mendoza	10	1,741,610
Misiones	7	1,097,829
Neuquén	5	550,334
Río Negro	5	633,374
Salta	7	1,215,207
San Juan	6	680,427
San Luis	5	431,588
Santa Cruz	5	272,524
Santa Fe	19	3,200,736
Santiago del Estero	7	896,461
Tierra del Fuego	5	126,190
Tucumán	9	1,448,200

=== By political groups ===
as of 9 December 2003

Bloc	Seats
Justicialist	111
Radical Civic Union	60
ARI	11
People's Movement Front	10
Socialist Party	8
Broad Front	8
Frepaso	6
Democratic Progressive	4
Action for the Republic	3
UCEDE	3
Neuquén People's Movement	3
Republican Force	2
Union for Argentina	2
Front for Change	2
Democratic	2
Civic and Social Front	2
Federalist Unity	2
Renewal Party	2
Single-member blocs	16

== Election cycles ==
Election	Term	
Election	Start	End
1999	10 December 1999	9 December 2001
2001	10 December 2001	9 December 2005

== List of deputies ==
Province	Deputy	Party	Term	
Province	Deputy	Party	From	To
Buenos Aires	Elda Susana Agüero	Justicialist	2002 (Note: Since 28 February 2002.)	2003
Buenos Aires	Guillermo Eduardo Alchouron	Action for the Republic	1999	2003
Buenos Aires	Alfredo Estanislao Allende	People's Movement Front	1999	2003
Buenos Aires	Mónica Susana Arnaldi	Justicialist	1999	2003
Buenos Aires	Alfredo Néstor Atanasof	Justicialist	1999	2002 (Note: Resigned on 28 February 2002 to assume office as Chief of the Cabinet of Ministers.)
Buenos Aires	Daniel Armando Basile	Justicialist	2001	2005
Buenos Aires	Sergio Ariel Basteiro	Socialist Party	2001	2005
Buenos Aires	Juan Pablo Baylac	Radical Civic Union	1999	2003
Buenos Aires	Marcela Alejandra Bianchi Silvestre	Justicialist	2001	2005
Buenos Aires	Jesús Abel Blanco	Justicialist	2001	2005
Buenos Aires	Marcela Antonia Bordaneve	ARI	1999	2003
Buenos Aires	Alberto Nicolás Briozzo	Justicialist	1999	2003
Buenos Aires	Carlos Ramón Brown	Justicialist	2001	2005
Buenos Aires	Mario Alejandro Cafiero	ARI	2001	2005
Buenos Aires	Eduardo Oscar Camaño	Justicialist	1999	2003
Buenos Aires	Graciela Camaño	Justicialist	2001	2002 (Note: Resigned on 2 May 2002 to assume office as Minister of Labour. Replaced by Carlos Martínez.)
Buenos Aires	Pascual Cappelleri	Radical Civic Union	2001	2005
Buenos Aires	Daniel Carbonetto	MMTA	2001	2005
Buenos Aires	Jorge Osvaldo Casanovas	Justicialist	2001	2005
Buenos Aires	Lilia Estrella Marina Cassese	Justicialist	2001	2004 (Note: Resigned on 2 March 2004 from her 2001–2005 term to replace José Antonio Pampuro.)
Buenos Aires	Alicia Amalia Castro	Front for Change	2001	2005
Buenos Aires	Franco Agustín Caviglia	Justicialist	1999	2003
Buenos Aires	Nora Alicia Chiacchio	Justicialist	1999	2003
Buenos Aires	Luis Francisco Jorge Cicogna	Justicialist	2001	2005
Buenos Aires	Juan Carlos Correa	Justicialist	2001	2005
Buenos Aires	Alberto Agustín Coto	Justicialist	2001	2005
Buenos Aires	Fabián De Nuccio	Broad Front	2001	2003 (Note: Resigned on 17 December 2003 from his 2001–2005 term to replace Rubén Giustiniani.)
Buenos Aires	Marta Isabel Di Leo	Radical Civic Union	1999	2003
Buenos Aires	José María Díaz Bancalari	Justicialist	1999	2003
Buenos Aires	María del Carmen Falbo	Justicialist	1999	2003
Buenos Aires	Alejandro Oscar Filomeno	Frepaso	2001	2005
Buenos Aires	Pablo Antonio Fontdevila	Justicialist	1999	2003
Buenos Aires	Rodolfo Aníbal Frigeri	Justicialist	2001	2005
Buenos Aires	Miguel Ángel García Mérida	Justicialist	2002 (Note: Since 28 February 2002.)	2003
Buenos Aires	Graciela Gastañaga	Radical Civic Union	2000 (Note: Since 1 November 2000.)	2003
Buenos Aires	Graciela María Giannettasio	Justicialist	1999	2002 (Note: Resigned on 28 February 2002 to assume office as Minister of Education.)
Buenos Aires	Norma Godoy	Justicialist	1999	2002 (Note: Resigned on 10 April 2002.)
Buenos Aires	Ricardo Carmelo Gómez	People's Movement Front	2002 (Note: Since 28 February 2002.)	2003
Buenos Aires	Oscar Roberto González	Socialist Party	2001 (Note: Since 7 March 2001.)	2003
Buenos Aires	Francisco Virgilio Gutiérrez	Social Pole	2001	2005
Buenos Aires	Margarita Ofelia Jarque	Broad Front	2001	2005
Buenos Aires	Miguel Antonio Jobe	Federalist Unity Party	1999	2003
Buenos Aires	Eduardo Gabriel Macaluse	ARI	2001	2005
Buenos Aires	Carlos Alberto Martínez	Justicialist	2002 (Note: Since 9 May 2002. Replaced Graciela Camaño.)	2005
Buenos Aires	Silvia Virginia Martínez	Justicialist	2001	2005
Buenos Aires	Miguel Ángel Mastrogiacomo	Radical Civic Union	2001 (Note: Since 2 May 2001.)	2003
Buenos Aires	María Lucrecia Monteagudo	Intransigent Party	2001	2005
Buenos Aires	Nilda Beatriz Morales	People's Movement Front	2001	2005
Buenos Aires	Leopoldo Raúl Guido Moreau	Radical Civic Union	2001	2005
Buenos Aires	María Graciela Ocaña	ARI	1999	2003
Buenos Aires	José Juan Bautista Pampuro	Justicialist	1999	2002 (Note: Resigned on 28 February 2002 to assume office as General Secretary of the Presidency.)
Buenos Aires	Lorenzo Antonio Pepe	Justicialist	1999	2003
Buenos Aires	Melchor Ángel Posse	People's Movement Front	2001	2004 (Note: Died on 16 January 2004. Replaced by Juan Carlos López.)
Buenos Aires	Elsa Siria Quiroz	ARI	1999	2003
Buenos Aires	Carlos Raimundi	Broad Front	1999	2003
Buenos Aires	Ricardo Rapetti	Justicialist	2002 (Note: Since 13 March 2002. Replaced Jorge Remes Lenicov.)	2005
Buenos Aires	Antonio Ubaldo Rattin	Federalist Unity Party	2001	2005
Buenos Aires	Jorge Luis Remes Lenicov	Justicialist	2001	2002 (Note: Resigned on 13 March 2002 to assume office as Minister of Economy. Replaced by Ricardo Rapetti.)
Buenos Aires	Osvaldo Hugo Rial	Justicialist	1999	2003
Buenos Aires	María del Carmen Cecilia Rico	People's Movement Front	2001	2005
Buenos Aires	Jorge Rivas	Socialist Party	2001	2005
Buenos Aires	Rodolfo Rodil	Popular Encounter	1999	2003
Buenos Aires	Oliva Rodríguez González	Justicialist	2001	2003 (Note: Resigned on 7 October 2003.)
Buenos Aires	Marcela Virginia Rodríguez	ARI	2001	2005
Buenos Aires	Rafael Edgardo Roma	ARI	1999	2003
Buenos Aires	Mirta Elsa Rubini	Justicialist	2001	2005
Buenos Aires	Liliana Ester Sánchez	Radical Civic Union	1999	2003
Buenos Aires	Roberto Miguel Saredi	Justicialist	2002 (Note: Since 28 February 2002. Replaced Carlos Soria.)	2003
Buenos Aires	Lisandro Mauricio Sejas	UCEDE	2002 (Note: Since 9 May 2002.)	2003
Buenos Aires	Carlos Ernesto Soria	Justicialist	1999	2002 (Note: Resigned on 2 January 2002 to assume office as Secretary of Intelligence. Replaced by Roberto Miguel Saredi.)
Buenos Aires	Margarita Rosa Stolbizer	Radical Civic Union	2001	2005
Buenos Aires	Hugo David Toledo	Justicialist	1999	2003
Buenos Aires	Rosa Ester Tulio	Justicialist	1999	2003
Buenos Aires	Saúl Ubaldini	Justicialist	2001	2005
Buenos Aires	Ricardo Héctor Vázquez	Radical Civic Union	1999	2003
Buenos Aires	Alfredo Horacio Villalba	Front for Change	1999	2003
Buenos Aires	Jorge Antonio Villaverde	Justicialist	2001	2005
Buenos Aires	Domingo Vitale	Justicialist	2001	2005
City of Buenos Aires	Darío Pedro Alessandro	Frepaso	1999	2003
City of Buenos Aires	María Elena Barbagelata	Socialist Party	2003 (Note: Since 8 May 2003. Replaced Horacio Vivo.)	2005
City of Buenos Aires	Alfredo Pedro Bravo	Socialist Party	1999	2003 (Note: Died on 26 May 2003. Replaced by María José Lubertino.)
City of Buenos Aires	Pedro Calvo	Radical Civic Union	1999	2003
City of Buenos Aires	Guillermo Marcelo Cantini	Union for Argentina	2001	2005
City of Buenos Aires	Gerardo Amadeo Conte Grand	Justicialist	2001	2005
City of Buenos Aires	José Luis Fernández Valoni	Action for the Republic	1999	2003
City of Buenos Aires	Fernanda Ferrero	Recreate for Growth	1999	2003
City of Buenos Aires	Nilda Celia Garré	Frepaso	2001	2005 (Note: Resigned on 25 June 2005.)
City of Buenos Aires	María América González	Broad Front	2001	2005
City of Buenos Aires	María José Lubertino	Socialist Party	2003 (Note: Since 4 June 2003. Replaced Alfredo Bravo.)	2003
City of Buenos Aires	Juan Carlos Lynch	Democratic Party of the Federal Capital	2001 (Note: Since 18 April 2001.)	2003
City of Buenos Aires	Rafael Martínez Raymonda	Democratic Progressive	2002 (Note: Since 28 February 2002. Replaced María Beatriz Nofal.)	2003
City of Buenos Aires	Fernando César Melillo	Broad Front	2000 (Note: Since 1 November 2000.)	2003
City of Buenos Aires	Laura Cristina Musa	ARI	2001	2005
City of Buenos Aires	Aldo Carlos Neri	Radical Civic Union	2001	2005
City of Buenos Aires	María Beatriz Nofal	Radical Civic Union	1999	2002 (Note: Resigned on 28 February 2002. Replaced by Rafael Martínez Raymonda.)
City of Buenos Aires	Irma Fidela Parentella	Broad Front	1999	2003
City of Buenos Aires	Inés Pérez Suárez	Justicialist	2002 (Note: Since 17 July 2002. Replaced Miguel Ángel Toma.)	2002 (Note: Resigned on 9 October 2002 to assume a 2001–2005 term replacing Daniel Scioli. Replaced by Diego Santilli.)
City of Buenos Aires	Inés Pérez Suárez	Justicialist	2002 (Note: Since 10 October 2002. Replaced Daniel Scioli.)	2005
City of Buenos Aires	Héctor Teodoro Polino	Socialist Party	2001	2005
City of Buenos Aires	Jesús Rodríguez	Radical Civic Union	1999	2003
City of Buenos Aires	José Alberto Roselli	Independent	2001	2005
City of Buenos Aires	Irma Roy	Justicialist	2001	2005
City of Buenos Aires	Diego César Santilli	Justicialist	2002 (Note: Since 9 October 2002. Replaced Inés Pérez Suárez.)	2003
City of Buenos Aires	Daniel Scioli	Justicialist	2001	2002 (Note: Resigned on 18 September 2002. Replaced by Inés Pérez Suárez.)
City of Buenos Aires	Marcelo Juan A. Stubrin	Radical Civic Union	1999	2003
City of Buenos Aires	Miguel Ángel Toma	Justicialist	1999	2002 (Note: Resigned on 17 July 2002. Replaced by Inés Pérez Suárez.)
City of Buenos Aires	Horacio Vivo	Radical Civic Union	2001	2003 (Note: Died on 10 April 2003. Replaced by María Elena Barbagelata.)
City of Buenos Aires	Patricia Walsh	United Left	2001	2005
City of Buenos Aires	Luis Fernando Zamora	Self-determination and Freedom	2001	2005
Catamarca	Octavio Néstor Cerezo	Justicialist	2001	2005
Catamarca	Simón Fermín Hernández	Civic and Social Front of Catamarca	1999	2003
Catamarca	Aída Maldonado	Civic and Social Front of Catamarca	2001	2005
Catamarca	Horacio Francisco Pernasetti	Radical Civic Union	2001	2005
Catamarca	Ramón Eduardo Saadi	Justicialist	1999	2003
Chaco	Liliana Amelia Bayonzo	Radical Civic Union	2001	2005
Chaco	Elisa María Avelina Carrió	ARI	1999	2003
Chaco	Ángel Oscar Geijo	Radical Civic Union	1999	2003
Chaco	Rafael Alfredo González	Justicialist	2001	2005
Chaco	Beatriz Norma Goy	Justicialist	2001	2005
Chaco	Atlanto Honcheruk	Justicialist	1999	2003
Chaco	Héctor Ramón Romero	Radical Civic Union	2001	2005
Chubut	Fortunato Rafael Cambareri	Radical Civic Union	1999	2003
Chubut	Víctor Hugo Cisterna	Justicialist	2001	2005
Chubut	Mario Das Neves	Justicialist	1999	2002 (Note: Resigned on 1 March 2002; resignation approved on 13 March 2002. Replaced by Elsa Lofrano.)
Chubut	Gustavo Daniel Di Benedetto	Radical Civic Union	2001	2005
Chubut	María Teresa Lernoud	Radical Civic Union	2001 (Note: Since 10 December 2001. Replaced Maestro.)	2003
Chubut	Elsa Lofrano	Justicialist	2002 (Note: Since 13 March 2002. Replaced Mario Das Neves.)	2003
Córdoba	Martha Carmen Alarcia	Justicialist	1999	2003
Córdoba	Carlos Tomás Alesandri	Justicialist	1999	2003
Córdoba	Alejandro Balian	Radical Civic Union	1999	2003
Córdoba	Mauricio Bossa	UCEDE	2003 (Note: Since 16 July 2003. Replaced Juan Schiaretti.)	2005
Córdoba	Jorge Luis Bucco	Justicialist	1999	2003
Córdoba	Eduardo Román Di Cola	Justicialist	1999	2003
Córdoba	Teresa Beatriz Foglia	Radical Civic Union	1999	2003
Córdoba	Eduardo Daniel García	Socialist Party	2001	2005
Córdoba	Oscar Félix González	Justicialist	2001	2005
Córdoba	Edgardo Roger Grosso	Radical Civic Union	1999	2003
Córdoba	Guillermo Ernesto Johnson	Justicialist	2001	2005
Córdoba	Arnoldo Lamisovsky	Justicialist	1999	2003
Córdoba	María Silvina Leonelli	Radical Civic Union	2001	2005
Córdoba	Luis Molinari Romero	Radical Civic Union	2001	2005
Córdoba	Fernando Montoya	Radical Civic Union	2001	2005
Córdoba	Alicia Isabel Narducci	Justicialist	2001	2005
Córdoba	Humberto Jesús Roggero	Justicialist	2001	2005
Córdoba	Juan Schiaretti	Justicialist	2001	2003 (Note: Resigned on 11 July 2003. Replaced by Mauricio Bossa.)
Córdoba	Atilio Pascual Tazzioli	Broad Front	1999	2003
Corrientes	Noel Eugenio Breard	Radical Civic Union	2001	2005
Corrientes	Ismael Ramón Cortinas	Autonomist	1999	2003
Corrientes	Agustín Díaz Colodrero	Liberal	1999	2003 (Note: Died on 8 April 2003. Replaced by Héctor Luis Moray.)
Corrientes	Cecilia Lugo de González Cabañas	Justicialist	2001	2005
Corrientes	José Rodolfo Martínez Llano	Justicialist	1999	2003
Corrientes	Araceli Estela Méndez de Ferreyra	Frepaso	2001 (Note: Since 10 December 2001. Replaced Horacio Colombi.)	2003
Corrientes	Héctor Luis Moray	FREPANU	2003 (Note: Since 8 May 2003. Replaced Agustín Díaz Colodrero.)	2003
Corrientes	Tomás Rubén Pruyas	Justicialist	2001	2005
Corrientes	Noel Eugenio Breard	Radical Civic Union	2001	2005
Corrientes	Gustavo Jesús Adolfo Canteros	Corrientes Project	2003	2007 (Note: Resigned on 28 November 2007. Replaced by Pedro Ademar Vera.)
Corrientes	Cecilia Lugo de González Cabañas	Justicialist	2001	2005
Corrientes	Carlos Guillermo Macchi	PANU	2003	2007
Corrientes	Araceli Estela Méndez de Ferreyra	Convergence	2003	2007
Corrientes	Hugo Rubén Perié	Justicialist	2003	2007
Corrientes	Tomás Rubén Pruyas	Justicialist	2001	2005
Entre Ríos	Hugo Ramón Cettour	Justicialist	2001	2005
Entre Ríos	Guillermo Eduardo Corfield	Radical Civic Union	1999	2003
Entre Ríos	Gustavo Cusinato	Radical Civic Union	2001	2005
Entre Ríos	Jorge Carlos Daud	Justicialist	2001 (Note: Since 10 December 2001. Replaced Busti.)	2003
Entre Ríos	Teresa Hortensia Ferrari	Justicialist	1999	2003
Entre Ríos	María Elena Herzovich	Radical Civic Union	1999	2003
Entre Ríos	Gracia María Jaroslavsky	Radical Civic Union	2001	2005
Entre Ríos	Blanca Inés Osuna	Justicialist	2001	2005
Entre Ríos	Julio Rodolfo Solanas	Justicialist	2001	2003 (Note: Resigned. Replaced by Delma Bertolyotti from 17 December 2003.)
Formosa	Adriana Raquel Bortolozzi de Bogado	Justicialist	2001	2005
Formosa	Argentina Cerdán	Justicialist	2003 (Note: Since 1 March 2003. Replaced Martha Elizabeth Meza.)	2003
Formosa	Miguel Ángel Insfrán	Radical Civic Union	1999	2003
Formosa	Martha Elizabeth Meza	Justicialist	1999	2003 (Note: Died on 12 January 2003. Replaced by Argentina Cerdán.)
Formosa	Luis Alberto Sebriano	Justicialist	1999	2003
Formosa	Pedro A. Vénica	People's Movement Front	2001	2005
Jujuy	Marta del Carmen Argul	MORECI	1999	2003
Jujuy	María Teresa Ferrín	Radical Civic Union	2001	2005
Jujuy	Miguel Ángel Giubergia	Radical Civic Union	1999	2003
Jujuy	Julio Carlos Moisés	Justicialist	2001 (Note: Since 10 December 2001. Replaced Jenefes.)	2003
Jujuy	Alejandro Mario Nieva	Radical Civic Union	2001	2005
Jujuy	Carlos Daniel Snopek	Justicialist	2001	2005
La Pampa	Manuel Justo Baladrón	Justicialist	2001	2005
La Pampa	Horacio Aníbal Fernández	Justicialist	2002 (Note: Since 9 October 2002. Replaced Jorge Matzkin.)	2003
La Pampa	Jorge Rubén Matzkin	Justicialist	1999	2002 (Note: Resigned on 18 September 2002. Replaced by Horacio Aníbal Fernández.)
La Pampa	Juan Carlos Olivero	Radical Civic Union	1999	2003
La Pampa	Marta Lucía Osorio	Justicialist	2001	2005
La Pampa	Claudio Héctor Pérez Martínez	Radical Civic Union	2001	2005
La Rioja	Griselda Noemí Herrera	Justicialist	2001	2005
La Rioja	Adrián Menem	Justicialist	1999	2003
La Rioja	Benjamín Ricardo Nieto Brizuela	Radical Civic Union	1999	2003
La Rioja	Alejandra Beatriz Oviedo	Justicialist	1999	2003
La Rioja	Ricardo Clemente Quintela	Justicialist	2001	2003 (Note: Until 17 December 2003.)
Mendoza	Guillermo Amstutz	Justicialist	2001	2005
Mendoza	Elsa Haydée Correa	Action for the Republic	1999	2003
Mendoza	Daniel Esaín	FISCAL	2001	2005
Mendoza	Víctor Manuel Federico Fayad	Radical Civic Union	2001	2005
Mendoza	Gustavo Eduardo Gutiérrez	Democratic	1999	2003
Mendoza	Arturo Pedro Lafalla	Justicialist	1999	2003
Mendoza	Gabriel Joaquín Llano	Democratic	2001	2005
Mendoza	Aldo Héctor Ostropolsky	Radical Civic Union	2001 (Note: Since 10 December 2001. Replaced Baglini.)	2003
Mendoza	Norma Raquel Pilati	Justicialist	2001	2005
Mendoza	Cristina Zuccardi	Frepaso	1999	2003
Misiones	Hernán Norberto Damiani	Radical Civic Union	2001	2005
Misiones	Julio César Humada	Justicialist	2001	2005
Misiones	Celia Isla de Saraceni	Justicialist	2001	2005
Misiones	Juan C. López	Justicialist	2001 (Note: Since 10 December 2001. Replaced Puerta.)	2003
Misiones	Marta Palou	Justicialist	1999	2003
Misiones	María Nilda Soda	Radical Civic Union	1999	2003
Misiones	Raúl Jorge Solmoirago	Radical Civic Union	1999	2003
Neuquén	Luis Julián Jalil	Neuquén People's Movement	2001	2005
Neuquén	Encarnación Lozano	Neuquén People's Movement	2001	2005
Neuquén	Víctor Peláez	Radical Civic Union	1999	2003
Neuquén	Gabriel Luis Romero	Justicialist	2001	2003 (Note: Until 17 December 2003.)
Neuquén	Haydée Teresa Savron	Neuquén People's Movement	2000 (Note: Since 24 February 2000.)	2003
Río Negro	Julio Accavallo	Frepaso	2001	2005
Río Negro	Carlos Alberto Larreguy	Justicialist	2001	2005
Río Negro	Marta Silvia Milesi	Radical Civic Union	1999	2003
Río Negro	Jorge Raúl Pascual	Radical Civic Union	1999	2003
Río Negro	Ovidio Osvaldo Zúñiga	Justicialist	1999	2003
Salta	María Lelia Chaya	Justicialist	2001	2005
Salta	Zulema Beatriz Daher	Justicialist	1999	2003
Salta	Julio César Loutaif	Renewal Party	2001 (Note: Since 10 December 2001. Replaced Gómez Diez.)	2003
Salta	Enrique Tanoni	Justicialist	2001	2005
Salta	Juan Manuel Urtubey	Justicialist	1999	2003
Salta	Andrés Zottos	Renewal Party	2001	2005
San Juan	Roberto Gustavo Basualdo	People's Movement Front	2001	2005
San Juan	Mario Osvaldo Capello	Radical Civic Union	1999	2003
San Juan	Julio César Conca	Bloquista	1999	2003
San Juan	Dante Elizondo	Justicialist	2001	2005
San Juan	Jorge Alberto Escobar	Justicialist	1999	2003
San Juan	Juan Jesús Mínguez	People's Movement Front	2001	2005
San Luis	Oraldo Norvel Britos	Justicialist	1999	2003
San Luis	José Guillermo L'Huillier	People's Movement Front	2001	2005
San Luis	Antonio Arnaldo Lorenzo	Radical Civic Union	1999	2003
San Luis	José Arnaldo Mirabile	People's Movement Front	2001	2005
San Luis	María Angélica Torrontegui	People's Movement Front	2001	2003 (Note: Until 10 December 2003.)
Santa Cruz	Sergio Acevedo	Justicialist	2001	2003 (Note: Resigned on 28 May 2003. Replaced by Daniel Varizat.)
Santa Cruz	Dante Omar Canevarolo	Justicialist	2001 (Note: Since 10 December 2001. Replaced Nicolás Fernández.)	2003
Santa Cruz	Mónica Kuney	Justicialist	2001	2005
Santa Cruz	Alfredo Anselmo Martínez	Radical Civic Union	2001	2005
Santa Cruz	Ricardo Ancell Patterson	Radical Civic Union	1999	2003
Santa Cruz	Daniel Varizat	Justicialist	2003 (Note: Since 4 June 2003. Replaced Sergio Acevedo.)	2005
Santa Fe	María del Carmen Alarcón	Justicialist	1999	2003
Santa Fe	Ángel Enzo Baltuzzi	Justicialist	2001	2005
Santa Fe	María Emilia Biglieri	Democratic Progressive	1999	2003
Santa Fe	Carlos Caballero Martín	Democratic Progressive	1999	2003
Santa Fe	Carlos Alberto Castellani	UCEDE	1999	2003
Santa Fe	Héctor José Cavallero	Justicialist	1999	2003
Santa Fe	Irma Amelia Foresi	Justicialist	2001	2005
Santa Fe	Rubén Héctor Giustiniani	Socialist Party	2001	2003 (Note: Resigned. Replaced by Nelson de Lajonquière from 17 December 2003.)
Santa Fe	Alicia Verónica Gutiérrez	ARI	2001 (Note: Since 31 October 2001.)	2003
Santa Fe	Julio César Gutiérrez	Justicialist	2001	2005
Santa Fe	Carlos Raúl Iparraguirre	Radical Civic Union	2000 (Note: Since 24 February 2000.)	2003
Santa Fe	Juan Carlos Millet	Radical Civic Union	1999	2003
Santa Fe	Alberto A. Natale	Democratic Progressive	2001	2005
Santa Fe	Jorge Alberto Obeid	Justicialist	1999	2003
Santa Fe	Sarah Ana Picazo	Radical Civic Union	1999	2003
Santa Fe	Alberto José Piccinini	Socialist Party	2001	2005
Santa Fe	Lilia Puig de Stubrin	Radical Civic Union	2001	2005
Santa Fe	Francisco Nicolás Sellares	Justicialist	2001	2005
Santa Fe	Hugo Guillermo Storero	Radical Civic Union	2001	2005
Santiago del Estero	Roberto José Ábalos	Radical Civic Union	2001	2005
Tierra del Fuego	Miguel Ángel Baigorria	Justicialist	2001	2005
Tierra del Fuego	Omar Enrique Becerra	Justicialist	1999	2003
Tierra del Fuego	Rosana Andrea Bertone	Justicialist	2001	2005
Tierra del Fuego	Marcelo Luis Dragan	Union for Argentina	1999	2003
Tierra del Fuego	Luis Alberto Trejo	Radical Civic Union	1999	2003
Santiago del Estero	Mario Héctor Bonacina	Civic and Social Movement	1999	2003
Santiago del Estero	José Oscar Figueroa	Justicialist	1999	2003
Santiago del Estero	Miguel Roberto Mukdise	Radical Civic Union	1999	2003
Santiago del Estero	Nélida Palomo	Justicialist	2002 (Note: Since 9 May 2002.)	2005
Santiago del Estero	Juan D. Pinto Bruchmann	Justicialist	2001	2005
Santiago del Estero	Fernando Omar Salim	Justicialist	1999	2003
Tucumán	Roque Tobías Álvarez	Justicialist	2001	2005
Tucumán	Ricardo Argentino Bussi	Republican Force	2001	2003 (Note: Resigned.)
Tucumán	Stella Maris Córdoba	Justicialist	2001	2005
Tucumán	Carlos Alberto Courel	Radical Civic Union	1999	2003
Tucumán	José Ricardo Falú	Justicialist	2001	2005
Tucumán	Alberto Herrera	Justicialist	1999	2003
Tucumán	Roberto Ignacio Lix Klett	Republican Force	2000 (Note: Since 18 May 2000.)	2003
Tucumán	Olijela del Valle Rivas	Justicialist	1999	2003
Tucumán	José Alberto Vitar	Broad Front	1999	2003
