= Central de Reunión de Inteligencia Militar =

Argentine military intelligence agency

The Central de Inteligencia Militar (Military Intelligence Center, CIM) is an Argentine intelligence agency in charge of permanently assisting and coordinating the functions and operations of all Army intelligence services.

== See also ==
- Army Intelligence Service
- Naval Intelligence Service
- Air Force Intelligence Service
- National Intelligence System
- National Directorate of Strategic Military Intelligence
