= División de Informaciones =

Former Argentinian Intelligence agency

División de Informaciones is a defunct Argentine intelligence agency created by Juan Perón to work within the National Presidential Office.

Its director was Rodolfo Freude, who was the head of Argentina's post-war intelligence agency, the Secretariat of Intelligence, between 1946 and 1955. The agency collaborated in the smuggling of Nazi war criminals to Argentina in what became known as ODESSA.

== See also ==
- Secretariat of Intelligence
- National Intelligence System
- National Intelligence School
- Directorate of Judicial Surveillance
- National Directorate of Criminal Intelligence
- National Directorate of Strategic Military Intelligence
