= Unidad de Inteligencia Financiera (Argentina) =

Argentine financial intelligence agency

Unidad de Inteligencia Financiera (Financial Intelligence Unit) is the intelligence agency of the Argentine Ministry of Economy. Its stated official purpose is collecting intelligence for the purpose of preventing financial crimes and the detection of financing of terrorism and of weapons of mass destruction.

== International collaboration ==
The Argentinian UIF has been a participant in the Egmont Group of Financial Intelligence Units since being admitted in 2003. Although in 2022 La Nacion reported that the Argentinian agency had received only 29% as much information via the Egmont network, indicating a lack of trust in the Argentinian government. In 2024 the Financial Action Task Force (FATF) met to in part to vote on whether to move Argentina to a list of countries that do not cooperate in the fight against money laundering. The FATF determined that Argentina had improved its efforts to combat money laundering, and thus avoid being put on the "grey list," although the organization stated Argentina still had room for growth.

== Timeline of presidents ==
- José Sbatella - 2010 to 2015
- Mariano Federici - (?) to December 2019
- Carlos Cruz - January 2020 to December 2021
- Juan Carlos Otero - December 2021 to February 2024
- Ignacio Martín Yacobucci - February 2024 to Present

== See also ==
- National Intelligence System
- National Intelligence School
- Secretariat of Intelligence
- National Directorate of Criminal Intelligence
- National Directorate of Strategic Military Intelligence
