= List of secretaries of intelligence of Argentina =

The following is a semi complete list of secretaries of intelligence of Argentina :

Took office	Left office	Name	Agency
1946	Unknown	Rodolfo Freude	División de Informaciones
1955	1958	Gral. Juan Constantino Quaranta	Coordinación de Informaciones de Estado/Secretaría de Informaciones de Estado
1958	1962	Navy Captain Juan Carlos Varela	Secretaría de Informaciones de Estado
1963	1966	Merado Gallardo Valdés	
1966	1967	Gen. Roberto Marcelo Levingston	
1967	1970	Gen. Eduardo Argentino Señorans	
1971	1973	Gen. Carlos Alberto Martínez	
1976	1977	Gen. Otto Carlos Paladino	Secretaría de Inteligencia de Estado
1977	1983	Div. Gen. Carlos Alberto Martínez	
1983	1989	Roberto Peña	
1986	1989	Facundo Suárez	
1989	1990	Juan Bautista Yofre	
1990	1999	Hugo Anzorreguy	
1999	1999	Jorge de la Rúa	
1999	2001	Fernando De Santibañes	
2001	2002	Carlos Becerra	Secretaría de Inteligencia de Estado/Secretaría de Inteligencia
2001	2001	Carlos Sargnese	Secretaría de Inteligencia
2002	2002	Carlos Ernesto Soria	
2002	2003	Miguel Ángel Toma	
2003	2003	Sergio Acevedo	
2003	2014	Héctor Icazuriaga	
2014	Incumbent	Oscar Parrilli	

== Subsecretaries ==
Took office	Left office	Name	Agency
1990	1999	Admiral Juan Carlos Anchezar	Secretaría de Inteligencia de Estado/Secretaría de Inteligencia
2001	2001	Hector Maya	
2001	2002	Darío Richarte	Secretaría de Inteligencia de Estado/Secretaría de Inteligencia
2002	2003	Oscar Rodriguez	Secretaría de Inteligencia
2003	2014	Francisco Larcher	Secretaría de Inteligencia
2014	Incumbent	Juan Martín Mena	

== See also ==
- Secretariat of Intelligence
- Argentine intelligence agencies
- National Intelligence System
- National Intelligence School
- Directorate of Judicial Surveillance
- National Directorate of Criminal Intelligence
- National Directorate of Strategic Military Intelligence
