= Jefatura de Inteligencia del Estado Mayor Conjunto de las Fuerzas Armadas =

The Jefatura de Inteligencia del Estado Mayor Conjunto de las Fuerzas Armadas (Intelligence Department of the Joint General Staff of the Armed Forces, J-2) is an Argentine federal agency in charge of controlling all the military intelligence services. The name J-2 refers to Jefatura 2, the official denomination assigned to military intelligence divisions of each branch.

== See also ==
- Army Intelligence Service
- Naval Intelligence Service
- Air Force Intelligence Service
- National Intelligence System
- National Directorate of Strategic Military Intelligence
- US Army G-2
