= Jorge de la Rúa =

Argentine lawyer (1942–2015)

Jorge de la Rúa (1942 – August 15, 2015) was an Argentine lawyer and former Government employee. He was a brother of former President of Argentina Fernando de la Rúa and was his minister of justice from 2000 until his brother's resignation.

Preceded by Hugo Anzorreguy	Secretary of Intelligence; 1999–1999	Succeeded by Fernando de Santibañes

== See also ==
- List of secretaries of intelligence of Argentina
