= Army Intelligence Service =

Argentine Army's intelligence agency

Servicio de Inteligencia del Ejército (Army Intelligence Service, SIE) is the Argentine Army's intelligence agency. It is a division of J-2 and reports to the Army's Jefatura II (the General Staff's intelligence service).

The Service is composite of 11 Intelligence Companies, 30 Independent Intelligence Platoons, 1 Intelligence Support Group, 1 Military Intelligence Collector Centre, 3 Division Intelligence Collection Centre, and 2 Combat Army Intelligence Detachment (601 & 602), two units of special intelligence operations.

== Intelligence Units ==
Unit	Command	Place	Province
1st Intelligence Company	I Armored Brigade	Tandil	Buenos Aires
2nd Intelligence Company	II Armored Brigade	Santa Fe	Santa Fe
3rd Intelligence Company	III Jungle Brigade	Resistencia	Chaco
4th Intelligence Company	IV Parachute Brigade	Córdoba	Córdoba
5th Intelligence Company	V Mountain Brigade	Salta	Salta
6th Intelligence Company	VI Mountain Brigade	Neuquén	Neuquén
8th Intelligence Company	VIII Mountain Brigade	Mendoza	Mendoza
9th Intelligence Company	IX Mechanized Brigade	Comodoro Rivadavia	Chubut
10th Intelligence Company	X Mechanized Brigade	Santa Rosa	La Pampa
11th Intelligence Company	XI Mechanized Brigade	Río Gallegos	Santa Cruz
12th Intelligence Company	XII Jungle Brigade	Posadas	Misiones
121st Division Intelligence Collection Centre	I Army Division	Curuzú Cuatiá	Corrientes
141st Division Intelligence Collection Centre	II Army Division	Córdoba	Córdoba
181st Division Intelligence Collection Centre	III Army Division	Bahía Blanca	Buenos Aires
Military Intelligence Centre	J-II Army	Campo de Mayo	Buenos Aires
601st Combat Army Intelligence Detachment	J-II Army	Campo de Mayo	Buenos Aires
602nd Combat Army Intelligence Detachment	J-II Army	Holmberg	Córdoba
Intelligence Support Battalion	J-II Army	Campo de Mayo	Buenos Aires

== See also ==
- Argentine Army
- Naval Intelligence Service
- Air Force Intelligence Service
- National Intelligence System
- National Directorate of Strategic Military Intelligence
