= Takilleitor =

- Directed by: Daniel de la Vega
- Written by: Felipe Vilches
- Starring: Luis Dimas
- Music by: Carlos Cabezas
- Distributed by: Televisión Nacional de Chile
- Release date: February 1998
- Running time: 60 minutes
- Country: Chile
- Language: Spanish

(This sea knows too much) Takilleitor (Spanish: (Este mar sabe demasiado) Takilleitor) is a 1998 Chilean film directed by Daniel de la Vega and starring Luis Dimas.

It took four years for the film to be produced and filmed due to financial problems. TVN joined the production after paying $15,000. The same television channel aired it in 1998, setting low ratings.

Critics rate the film as "the worst fiction in Chilean cinema". Through the years, it was transformed into a "cult film".

== Plot ==
The film shows a successful Luis Dimas and his driver, known as Takilleitor, driving through the streets of the country. Along with them are two former agents of the National Intelligence Center (CNI), who are chasing a "wooden parrot" that contains a "political message". Amidst a series of strange events, the singer constantly appears performing some of the songs that made him famous during the era of the New Wave.

== Cast ==
- Luis Dimas
- Rodrigo Vidal
- Shlomit Baytelman
- Sergio Hernández
- Patricia Rivadeneira
- Elvira López
- Alejandra Fosalba
- Andrea Lamarca
- Luly Streeter
- Carolina Gallegos
- Pablo Striano
- Valeria Chignoli
- Mauricio Aravena
- Cristian Droguett
- Melanie Jösch
- Francisco Chat
- Ingrid Isensee
