= Finnen =

Finnen may refer to:

- Finnen (Eggerberg), a settlement in the municipality of Eggerberg in the Swiss canton of Valais
- Patricio Miguel Finnen, an Argentine intelligence operative
