= Unidad de Inteligencia Financiera =

Unidad de Inteligencia Financiera (English: Financial intelligence unit) may refer to:

- Unidad de Inteligencia Financiera (Argentina)
- Unidad de Inteligencia Financiera (Mexico)
