= Gustavo Arribas =

Argentine politician

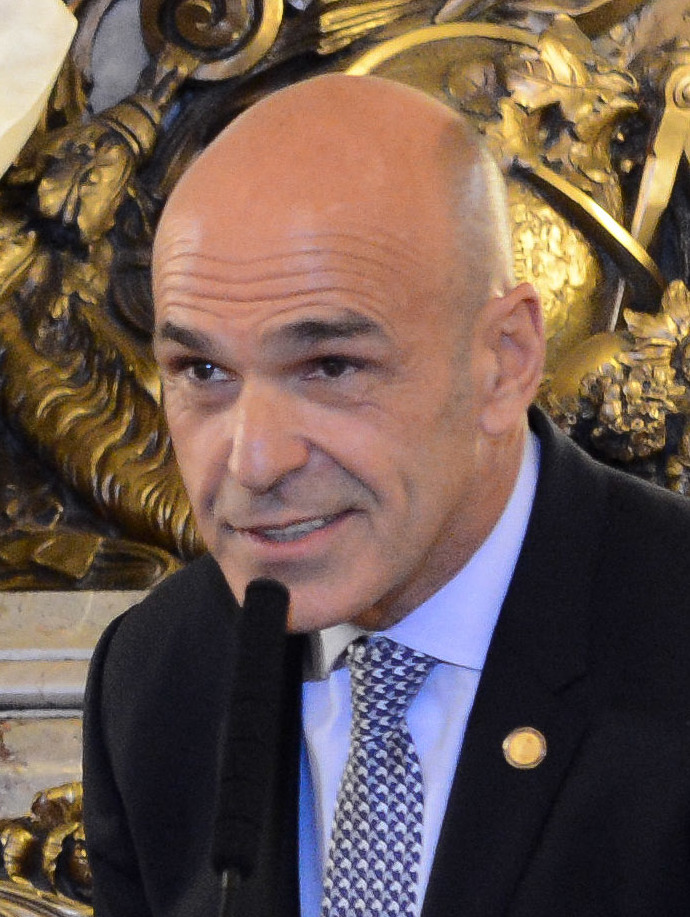
- In 2015

Director-General of the Federal Intelligence Agency of Argentina
- In office 10 December 2015 – 10 December 2019
- President: Mauricio Macri
- Deputy: Silvia Majdalani
- Preceded by: Oscar Parrilli
- Succeeded by: Cristina Caamaño

Personal details
- Born: November 25, 1958 (age 67) Buenos Aires
- Party: Republican Proposal

Gustavo Arribas (born 25 November 1958) is an Argentine scribe and politician. He was the Director-General of the Federal Intelligence Agency of Argentina. He headed the agency from December 2015 to December 2019.

== Career ==
Prior to heading the Federal Intelligence Agency, Arribas was an agent and broker for professional soccer players.

== Corruption allegations ==
Arribas was accused by Brazilian police of receiving $850,000 through a money-laundering scheme.

Arribas was also investigated for possibly accepting a bribe of $600,000 from Odebrecht in 2013.
