= Servicio de Inteligencia de la Fuerza Aérea =

Servicio de Inteligencia de la Fuerza Aérea (lit. 'Air Force Intelligence Service', SIFA) is the intelligence agency of the Argentine Air Force. It is part of J-2. Its director is Commodore García.

== See also ==
- Army Intelligence Service
- Naval Intelligence Service
- National Intelligence System
- National Directorate of Strategic Military Intelligence
