= Carlos Becerra (politician) =

Argentine Radical Civic Union politician

Carlos Ernesto Becerra is an Argentine Radical Civic Union politician.

On October 23, 2000, Becerra became Secretary General of the Presidency under President Fernando de la Rúa. Shortly afterwards he was appointed by de la Rúa as Secretary of Intelligence from 2000 to 2001 to replace the previous Secretary, Fernando De Santibañes.

== See also ==
- List of secretaries of intelligence of Argentina

Preceded by Fernando De Santibañes	Secretary of Intelligence; 2000–2001	Succeeded by Carlos Sergnese
