= Federal Intelligence Agency =

Intelligence agency of the Argentine Republic

Coordinates: 34°36′25″S 58°22′14″W

- Agencia Federal de Inteligencia
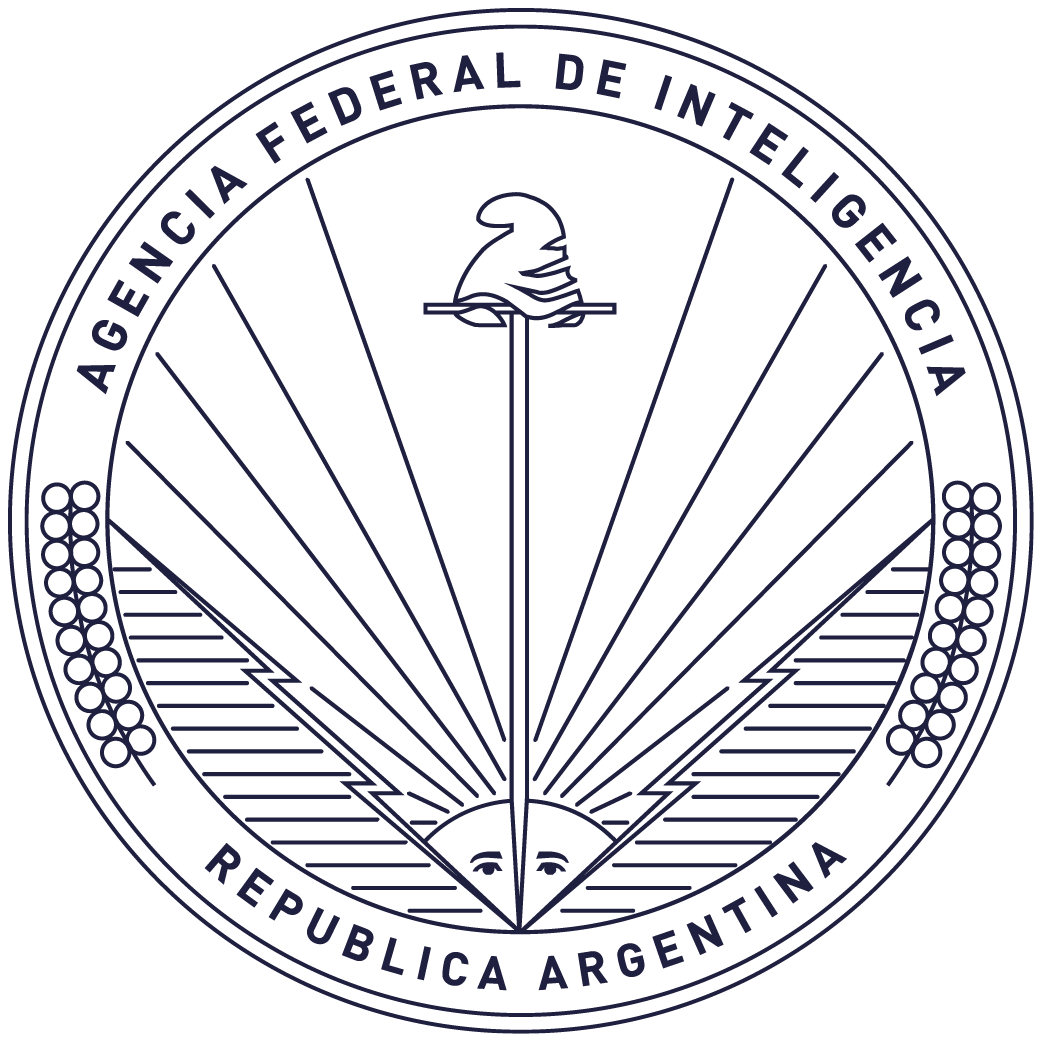

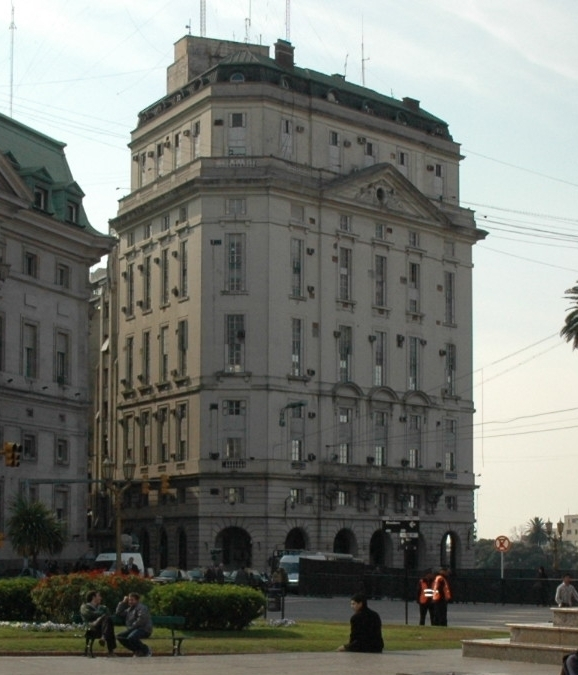
- AFI headquarters in Buenos Aires

Agency overview
- Formed: March 2015
- Preceding Agency: SI
- Dissolved: 15 July 2024; 2 years ago
- Type: Intelligence agency
- Jurisdiction: Argentina
- Headquarters: Buenos Aires
- Employees: Classified (AFI personnel information is not allowed).
- Agency executive: Sergio Neiffert, Interventor

The Federal Intelligence Agency (Spanish: Agencia Federal de Inteligencia) mostly known for its abbreviation AFI, was the principal intelligence agency of Argentina.

This organization was the successor to the Secretariat of Intelligence (mostly known for its acronym "SIDE") and has two purposes: to collect national intelligence for governmental needs and criminal intelligence. It also was transferred from the Ministry of Security, to the National Criminal Intelligence.

The agency was created by Law 27,126 amending the National Intelligence Act entering into force 120 days after enactment of the Act. According to regulations shall govern all communication by the Director General or Deputy Director General any interaction being punished by the members of the AFI any action or relationship regulated by the law establishing the Federal Intelligence Agency. In turn AFI officials should make affidavits without distinction of degrees.

The organization was dissolved in July 2024 by president Javier Milei, restoring the Secretariat of Intelligence (SIDE).

== Overview ==
This agency was ruled by the Law of National Intelligence #25,520, promulgated in March 2015 and entered into force 120 days after that. Changes to previous legislation included the dissolution of Secretariat of Intelligence, with the AFI as its successor. Likewise, the Ministry of Security transferred the "National Direction of Criminal Intelligence" to AFI.

The organization was put under the Supreme Court in 2015, alleging that "...the execution of a communication intervention order is carried out by a body other than the one that is part of the investigation"

The Argentinian Federal Prosecutor Cecilia Incardona indictment against the former director of the AFI Gustavo Arribas and his deputy director Silvia Majdalani in 2020, for illegal espionage against 50 politicians, including the then president Cristina Kirchner in 2018. A group of 18 employees is said to have spied on Kirchner's notebooks, among other things.

In July 2024, president of Argentina dissolved the AFI, replacing it with the former intelligence agency, Secretariat of Intelligence (popularly known for its acronym "SIDE").

== Board ==
The AFI main authorities (general director and vice-director) were appointed by the President of Argentina, then confirmed by the Senate. Their functions were regulated by Law 25,520.

N.°	Director	Political Party	Term	President
1	Oscar Parrilli	Justicialist Party	5 March 2015 - 10 December 2015	Cristina Fernández de Kirchner
2	Gustavo Arribas	Republican Proposal	10 December 2015 - 10 December 2019	Mauricio Macri
3	Cristina Caamaño (interventor)	Independent	23 December 2019 - 6 June 2022	Alberto Fernández
4	Agustín Rossi (interventor)	Justicialist Party	8 June 2022 - 15 February 2023	Alberto Fernández
5	Ana Clara Alberdi (interventor)	Justicialist Party	15 February 2023 - 12 December 2023	Alberto Fernández
6	Silvestre Sívori (interventor)	Independent	12 December 2023 - 27 May 2024	Javier Milei
7	Sergio Neiffert (interventor)	Independent	6 June 2024 – Present	Javier Milei
