= Juan Bautista Yofre =

Argentine journalist and politician

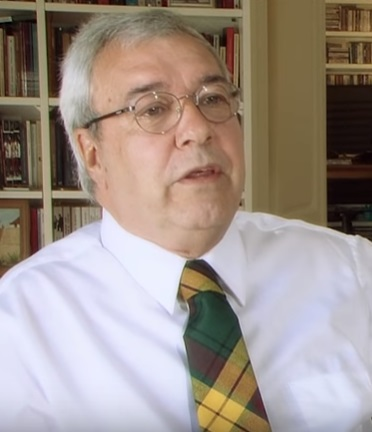

Juan Bautista 'Tata' Yofre is an Argentine journalist and writer, and a former politician.

Yofre was the Argentine Secretary of Intelligence from 1989 to 1990, in the early part of Carlos Menem's presidency. He was replaced by Hugo Anzorreguy following constant accusations of corruption surrounding the Presidential environment. He later occupied positions as ambassador to Panama and other countries.

In 2008 he was indicted on charges of espionage for using his Intelligence contacts for intercepting email messages from members of the government. While the court found he had done so, he was later acquitted because those emails were not considered classified information.

In 2024, he declared his support for the May 25th Pact.

Preceded by Facundo Suárez	Secretary of Intelligence; 1989–1990	Succeeded by Hugo Anzorreguy

== See also ==
- List of secretaries of intelligence of Argentina
