= Fernando de Santibañes =

Fernando De Santibañes

Secretary of State Intelligence
- In office December 23, 1999 – October 23, 2000
- President: Fernando de la Rúa
- Preceded by: Hugo Anzorreguy
- Succeeded by: Carlos Becerra

Personal details
- Born: March 11, 1945 (age 81) Berisso, Buenos Aires Province, Argentina
- Party: Radical Civic Union
- Education: Universidad del Salvador University of Chicago
- Profession: Financier

Fernando de Santibañes (born March 11, 1945) is an Argentine politician and banker. He was the Secretariat of Intelligence (SIDE) of the Argentine Republic from December 1999 to October 2000, during the first half of Fernando de la Rúa's presidency. De Santibañes resigned the position after the media discovered the Secretariat's involvement in the Senate Bribery scandal. He was absolved of all charges related to the scandal in 2013.

== Biography ==
Born in Berisso, a working class suburb of La Plata, de Santibañes studied Economics at the Universidad del Salvador and the University of Chicago. He was a banker at the Banco Financiero from 1984 and headed the company from 1993 until it was sold to BBVA Banco Francés in 1997 for $184 million. His tenure at Financiero was highlighted by the acquisition of the much larger Banco de Crédito Argentino.

=== Tenure at State Intelligence ===
De Santibañes was appointed Secretary of Intelligence by his close friend and neighbor, the newly inaugurated President Fernando de la Rúa. Discontent at the agency intensified when de Santibañes had 1,200 SIDE personnel fired, drastically reducing the agency's operational capabilities.

The most serious controversy, however, arose when de Santibañes was implicated in the Argentine Senate bribery scandal of 2000, in which SIDE provided $5 million in cash that was later used to bribe six senators and the Parliamentary Secretary, Mario Pontaquarto, to support a government-sponsored labor law flexibilization bill in April of that year. De Santibañes reacted by staging a series of television interviews in which he criticized the governing political coalition, the Alliance, declaring it should dissolve because its internal crisis was hampering economic growth. His resignation had been demanded by members of FrePaSo, the government's junior coalition partner; Vice President Carlos Álvarez, FrePaSo's most prominent figure, resigned in October over de la Rúa's reluctance to dismiss the SIDE Secretary. De Santibañes ultimately resigned as SIDE chief on October 23, 2000.

Following his resignation, de Santibañes dedicated himself to breeding horses at his estate in Pilar, Buenos Aires. He, as well as Dick Morris' and Roger Stone's IKON Public Affairs, were sued in 2004 by Mattie Lolavar, a U.S. born public relations agent, for breach of contract. Her political consulting firm, Triumph Communications, was hired by IKON in July 2000 to represent the SIDE as media consultants in both Argentina and the United States; the United States Court of Appeals for the Fourth Circuit ruled against Lolavar in 2005. Following a number of stays, de Santibañes, former President de la Rúa, and other officials faced criminal charges related to the Senate Bribery scandal in 2007; they were ultimately absolved of all charges on December 23, 2013.

== See also ==
- List of secretaries of intelligence of Argentina

Government offices
| Preceded by Hugo Anzorreguy | Secretary of Intelligence; 1999–2000 | Succeeded by Carlos Becerra |
