= Servicio de Inteligencia Naval (Argentina) =

Servicio de Inteligencia Naval (Naval Intelligence Service) is the intelligence agency of the Argentine Navy. It is part of J-2 and the General Staff of the Navy. Its duties include gathering naval intelligence relevant to Argentina.

== See also ==
- Army Intelligence Service
- Air Force Intelligence Service
- National Intelligence System
- National Directorate of Strategic Military Intelligence
