= Elvira López (actress) =

Chilean actress (born 1966)

- Born: Elvira López Morales; September 13, 1966 (age 59); Concepcion, Chile
- Occupation: Actress
- Years active: 1992–

Elvira López Morales (Concepción, Biobío Region, September 13, 1966) is a Chilean film, theater and television actress.

== Career ==
She made her debut in the successful television series on Canal 13 Fácil de amar playing a small role, then emigrated to TVN in the television series Ámame, which had great success in Chile, where she played the sweet "Carmencita", sister of "J" (Carlos Concha) and friend of "Daniela" (Ángela Contreras). Later, always on the state channel, she played numerous roles in national soap operas, such as Rojo y Miel, Rompecorazón, among others.

Elvira returns in glory and majesty for the successful TV series on Channel 13 Machos, where she played the lost daughter of the "Mercader" family. After her return, she continues to be seen on the screen in unsuccessful teleseries Hippie, the successful Brujas and special appearances in Disparejas, Alguien te mira and Fortunato these last 2 in 2007.

In 2009 she appears in the Channel 13 television series; Cuenta conmigo where she plays Ximena, Anita's best friend, played by Carolina Arregui.

== Filmography ==
=== Film ===
- Los agentes de la KGB también se enamoran (1992) Romina
- Takilleitor (1997)
- Che Kopete, la película - Dolores Dupont (2007)

=== Telenovelas ===
| Year | Teleserie | Role | Channel |
|---|---|---|---|
| 1992 | Fácil de amar | Estela | Canal 13 |
| 1993 | Ámame | Carmen Carvallo | TVN |
| 1994 | Rompecorazón | María Paz Sulliván | TVN |
| 1994 | Rojo y Miel | Loreto Bernhardt | TVN |
| 2003 | Machos | Alicia Mercader | Canal 13 |
| 2004 | Hippie | Beatriz Morgan | Canal 13 |
| 2005 | Brujas | Candelaria Pérez | Canal 13 |
| 2006 | Disparejas | Ángela Lazo | TVN |
| 2007 | Alguien te mira | Blanca Gordon | TVN |
| 2007 | Fortunato | Ester Cuevas | Mega |
| 2009 | Cuenta Conmigo | Ximena Ulloa | Canal 13 |
| 2011 | Decibel 110 | Eugenia Ripamonti | Mega |

=== TV Series ===
| Year | Teleserie | Role | Channel |
|---|---|---|---|
| 2007 | Mi primera vez | Fernanda | TVN |
| 2007 | Casado con Hijos | Marlen Olivares | Mega |
