= Rodolfo Freude =

Argentine politician (1920–2003)

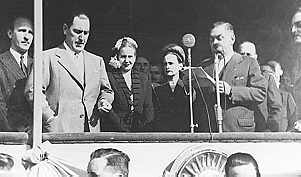
Spy chief Rodolfo Freude (far left), with Juan Perón and Eva Perón

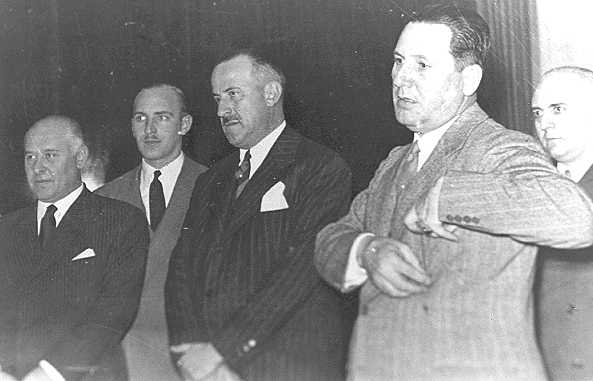
Freude (second from the left) with Juan Perón

Rodolfo Freude (11 September 1920 – 18 October 2003), also Rodolf or Rudolf, was a close advisor of President Juan Perón of Argentina and served as his director of the Information Division (División de Informaciones). Freude, an Argentine citizen of German descent, is suspected of having organized ODESSA and was involved in smuggling Nazi officers to Argentina.

== See also ==
- Coordinación de Informaciones de Estado
- Secretaría de Inteligencia
- List of secretaries of intelligence of Argentina
- Richard Walther Darré
- Carlos Fuldner
- Charles Lescat
- Ratlines (World War II)
