= Secretariat of Intelligence =

Argentinian Intelligence agency

Coordinates: 34°36′25″S 58°22′14″W

Secretariat of Intelligence of the State
- Secretaría de Inteligencia del Estado
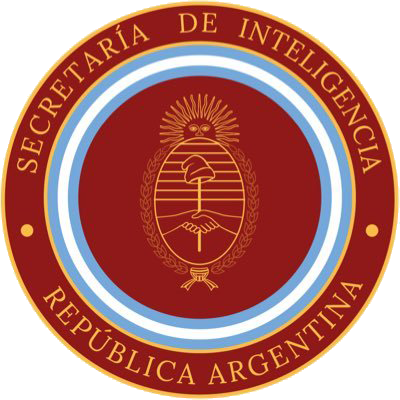

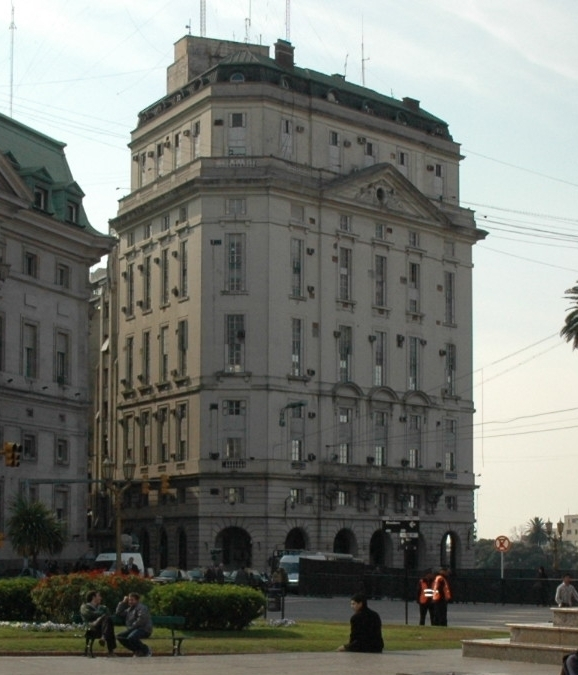
- The Secretariat's main building in Buenos Aires

Agency overview
- Formed: 1946
- Type: Intelligence
- Jurisdiction: Argentina
- Headquarters: Buenos Aires
- Agency executive: Sergio Neiffert, Secretary
- Website: argentina.gob.ar/inteligencia

Secretariat of Intelligence of the State (Spanish: Secretaría de Inteligencia del Estado, mostly known by its acronym SIDE) is the premier intelligence agency of the Argentine Republic and head of its National Intelligence System.

Chaired by the Secretary of State Intelligence, a special member of the Cabinet of Ministers, the Secretariat of Intelligence was a technical and operational service charged with the collection and production of intelligence and counterintelligence in internal and foreign areas, as well as the analysis and formation of a national intelligence strategy in order to handle state affairs. The Secretariat was charged with the duty of producing a complete intelligence cycle for the government. Structurally, S.I. had the biggest intelligence-gathering capabilities in Argentina, as it has numerous delegations within Argentina as well as foreign operational bases and delegations.

Under law, the Secretariat was subordinated to the Presidency and is ruled by secret decrees and laws. Even though the official acronym was renamed to S.I. as the new intelligence system became active, during most of its history it was called Secretaría de Inteligencia de Estado (Secretariat of State Intelligence, SIDE) and it still is referred to as SIDE by the public.

On January 26, 2015, after the case of the prosecutor Alberto Nisman's death, President Cristina Fernandez de Kirchner announced she was proposing legislation that would dissolve the (SI) and opening a new intelligence agency called the Federal Intelligence Agency (AFI). President Javier Milei closed the AFI and restored the SIDE in 2024.

== History ==
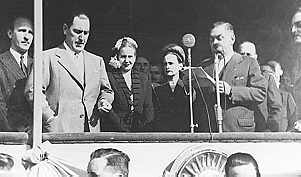
First public director of intelligence Rodolfo Freude (far left), with Juan Perón and Eva Perón

The Secretariat of Intelligence was created in 1946 when Juan Perón's first presidency established it by Executive Decree 337/46 under the denomination of Coordinación de Informaciones de Estado (State Intelligence Coordination, CIDE). Its mission was to act as a national intelligence agency to be run by civilian personnel and to handle foreign and domestic intelligence operations for the federal government.

Before CIDE was established, national intelligence was jointly handled by the División de Informaciones (Information Division, DI) of the Presidency, and the military intelligence services such as the Servicio de Inteligencia del Ejército (Army Intelligence Service, SIE) and the Servicio de Inteligencia Naval (Naval Intelligence Service, SIN). Even though throughout Argentina's history military intelligence organs have been involved in handling both internal and external intelligence, reforms enacted in the last few decades have legally given them a role alongside civilian managed services in the National Intelligence System.

The Secretariat (as it is commonly referred) had its first structural and functional reform in 1956, under the Pedro Aramburu government when by Executive Decree 776/56 of January 20, CIDE adopted the name Secretaría de Informaciones de Estado (Secretariat of State Information), and the subsequent famous acronym "SIDE". The newly restructured agency was closely modeled on the British intelligence system.

During Juan Carlos Onganía's government, SIDE was under the administration of General Señorans, one of the most well regarded secretaries of intelligence of all time. During those years, SIDE started to orchestrate its first complex foreign espionage missions, the staff was increased substantially to about 1,200, and the knowledge and operational capabilities were dramatically improved.

During Señorans administration, many Argentine women began participating in what was then a male-only field. The Secretariat began appreciating certain advantages of the female sex, especially when operations required the exploitation of human weaknesses. However, in 1966, Señorans restructured the Secretariat, expelling 900 employees (of about 1,200 total), including all of the female intelligence operatives contracted at the time. It has been noted that Señorans had a phobia of females, and would not tolerate women working in administrative positions.

In that same year, a failed kidnapping attempt of the Soviet Consul in Buenos Aires, led the USSR to enact a formal protest, threatening to take the matters to international organizations. Onganía, against his will, had no other choice but to ask Señorans to resign, the Secretary in his final statement exposed that "Consul Petrov commands a group of spies of the KGB in Argentina".

After Señorans departure, women regained their positions in the civil intelligence community, but it was at that time, with the onset of the Cold War, that the CIA began taking special interest in SIDE. The growth of communist groups and guerrillas in Latin America, backed by Fidel Castro's regime, as well as the special interest the Soviet Union began to take in Latin America, made the American intelligence community influence what was then thought as an area of minor concern to American interests in the war. The Secretariat of Intelligence was no exception, the 'communist problem' was made a priority, and surveillance of foreign embassies and delegations of communist countries became common.

Secret law Nº 20.195/73 came into effect on February 28, 1973 during the government of General Lanusse, literally establishing the mission, functions, personnel, and other important aspects of the agency; it is also known as the secret decree Nº 1.792/73, dated March 9, 1973.

On May 13, 1976, President Jorge Rafael Videla issued Executive Decree 416 changing the name of the agency to Secretaría de Inteligencia de Estado or "SIDE". Under the National Reorganization Process, SIDE transformed itself into a secret police conducting espionage on guerrilla organizations, labor unions, or any other organization or person considered subversive, or a supporter of subversive activities. SIDE also took part in coordinating Operation Condor with other Latin American intelligence services.

After the return of democracy in 1983, during Raúl Alfonsín's government, SIDE began renewing its staff, thus becoming a civilian intelligence agency focusing its activities entirely on national interests. In December 2001, the Intelligence Reform Law was approved, changing the structure, denomination and functions to adapt it to the new National Intelligence System.

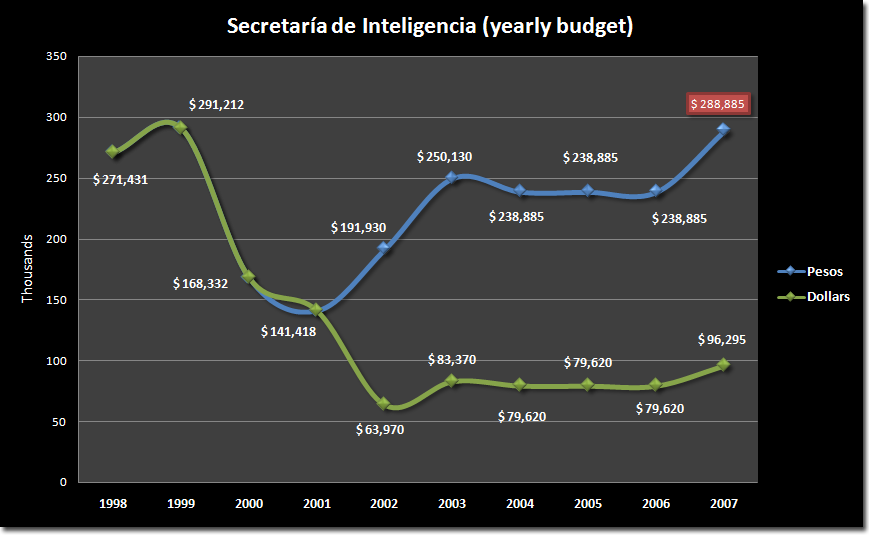
Graph depicting the Secretariat's yearly assigned budget since 1998

In February 2001, during the Fernando de la Rúa government, SIDE was suffering from budget cuts (reduced by half) and political pressures to renew itself. The staff was reduced by half, 1,300 personnel were laid off. One of the reasons given for the clean-up were that many staff members had been involved in human rights violations during the National Reorganization Process. This restructuring included laying off personnel who were past their retirement age according to the agency's standards, and removing most of the personnel from the return to democracy under the Alfonsín administration.

During October 2003, under Néstor Kirchner's government, a crackdown on illegal phone taps, as well as political and ideological espionage was ordered to Secretary of Intelligence Sergio Acevedo. More than 160 personnel were expelled from the organization for violations of regulations. An internal security review was also conducted, later producing a report stating several security holes and cases of corruption and theft in the organization (i.e., theft of food, extraction of gasoline from cars and poor security at facilities).

=== Counter-terrorism ===
In the aftermath of the 1992 Israeli Embassy attack in Buenos Aires, SIDE augmented its focus on terrorist activities in the Triple border region. The lingering threat of another act of Islamic terrorism on Argentine soil, especially against Jewish entities in Buenos Aires, required the Secretariat to adapt to a previously unknown national security threat.

Foreign intelligence agencies cooperated in training on subjects such as Islamic terrorism and how to neutralize it. The U.S. Central Intelligence Agency provided SIDE with extensive training, and experts from all over the world were contracted to teach classes in the National Intelligence School. SIDE also began instructing its personnel on Persian and Arabic languages and history, and how to handle operations with people and organizations pertaining to such cultures.

After the 1994 AMIA Bombing, SIDE recognized that Islamic terrorism had become an extremely serious threat to national security. A plan codenamed Operation Centaur (Operación Centauro) to monitor terrorist organizations on the Triple border was orchestrated in cooperation with the CIA, and included phone taps, mail interceptions, and covert surveillance of many suspects.

Its reports detailed the existence and activities of terrorist organizations in the area, which benefited from the huge black market in Paraguay and served as a financial laundering center for other organizations abroad. A 1997 report including evidence of such activities was shared with the intelligence agencies of the United States, Brazil, Paraguay, France and Germany. The Sala Patria group, formed to investigate clues about the AMIA bombing outside of Argentina, started operating in Paraguay and gave crucial information that led to the capture of many suspected terrorists and the neutralization of a suspected plan to bomb the U.S. Embassy in Asunción, Paraguay.

== Organization ==
SIDE is the head of the National Intelligence System, and also the largest intelligence agency of Argentina. It depends on the Presidency. It reports to the President of Argentina, who is required to set the national intelligence plan and policy.

Besides being an intelligence agency that handles foreign and internal intelligence, it also assists nationwide criminal investigations, somewhat like the American Federal Bureau of Investigation, SIDE frequently collaborates with the Justice Ministry.

The Secretariat embodies special internal suborganizations that aid its duties. The Escuela Nacional de Inteligencia (National Intelligence School, ENI) acts as the main intelligence academy, training and recruiting agents for SIDE, and providing tuition and assistance for personnel of other intelligence and law enforcement agencies. The ENI also analyzes Argentine intelligence doctrine and gives specialized intelligence post-graduate formation to students in the country, including courses given over the Internet.

In 2001, the Intelligence Reform Law 25.520 came into effect, subsequently making significant modifications to SIDE's traditional internal organization, as well as branching out some of its tasks to other newly created organizations such as the National Directorate of Criminal Intelligence.

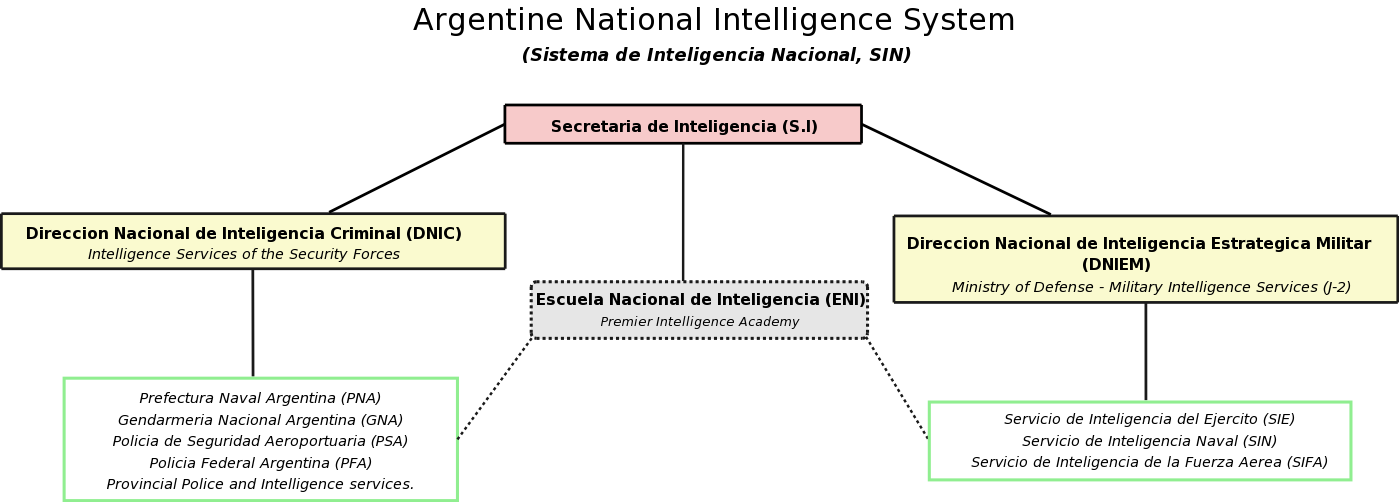
The Secretariat has a leading role in the National Intelligence System

The President of Argentina is charged to assign the positions of Secretary and Undersecretary of Intelligence, but restrictions apply on the Secretary of Intelligence's authority to assign his or her own contracted staff to this organ.

The Secretariat itself has three Undersecretariats of Interior and Exterior Intelligence, and Apoyo (support). They are subsequently codenamed A, B and C, or with numbers. In the foreign field, officers are usually disguised with diplomatic immunity in Argentine embassies and consulates around the world (practice common to the world of espionage). The positions of 'Media consultant', 'Cultural attaché', or 'Tourism consultant' are the most frequently used.

The current Secretary of Intelligence is Héctor Icazuriaga and the Undersecretary is Francisco Larcher, both appointed by President Néstor Kirchner. The third most-important position in SIDE is the Director General de Operaciones (General Director of Operations), which administers all intelligence and covert operations inside and outside the country; legendary secret agent Horacio Antonio Stiusso (Alias: Jaime Stiles) currently holds the position.

Silvia Fornasaro is in charge of the Dirección de Finanzas (Finances Directorate), which handles all of the Secretariat's accounting and budget balancing.

=== Objectives ===
The Secretariat's objectives in the functions of intelligence as mandated by law are:

- Protect the general well being of society, prioritizing the safeguarding of individual and collective rights in a frame of legality, integrity and objectivity.
- Identify and interpret, anticipated and coherently, threats against national territory as well as individual and collective human security, in function of the nation's vital interests.
- Assist the different areas of the national government about the capacities and vulnerabilities of the different actors -in the national and international spectrum- who might prevent the attainment of national objectives, thus collaborating in the process of decision making.
- Identify acts and processes that could be taken advantage of as "opportunities" in function of national interests.
- Promote and strengthen the relations with the greater possible number of foreign agencies and/or intelligence services, in order to create fluid channels of information exchange and intelligence.

Other more specific objectives of the Secretariat:

- Formulate the National Intelligence Plan (as mandated by Law 25.250)
- Coordinate the functional relations with the different members of the National Intelligence System.
- Collaborate with other areas of the government providing information and intelligence in order to detect and neutralize potential terrorist acts.
- Produce information in time and opportunity on important actors, events and processes of the regional, continental and worldwide frame with incidence on the country.
- Elaborate hypothesis on international terrorism, drug trafficking, traffic of arms, etc., in the worldwide, continental and regional frames.
- Carry out intelligence in the regional scope to forecast of important processes.
- Respond to the requirements of the Bilateral Commission on Control of Intelligence Organisms and Activities of the National Congress (as per Law 25.520)
- Elaborated prospective scenarios in the international spectrum and evaluate its impact on the country.
- Collaborate with the Justice system providing information necessary to fight crimes such as smuggling, organized crime, money laundering, fiscal evasion, etc.
- Assist different investigations authorized or ordered by competent judicial authorities referred from crimes such as extortion, kidnapping, smuggling, drug trafficking, copyright infringement of information technology material, falsification of money, etc.
- Plan and execute programs of qualification, training and improvement for the personnel of the Secretariat of Intelligence, the National Intelligence System, as well as for civil employees of other areas of the National Government.
- Expand the bonds with public and private studies centers and NGOs, both in the national and international scope.

=== Subjects of interest ===
The Secretariat's main interest points are the following:

- International terrorism, including the terrorist attacks against the Argentine Israelite Mutual Association (AMIA) and the Israeli Embassy in Buenos Aires.
- Religious fundamentalism.
- Organized crime, including mafias, drug trafficking, arms trafficking and identity falsification.
- Evolution of integration developments (North American Free Trade Agreement, Mercosur, Free Trade Area of the Americas, Asia-Pacific Economic Cooperation, European Union, etc.) and analysis of international economic negotiations regarding free market.
- Legal and illegal migrations and development of natives of the Americas.
- Proliferation of massive destruction weapons (nuclear, chemical, biological).
- Ecological problems that can be considered potential risks for national security.
- National and foreign advances in scientific areas.
- Evolution of the official policies on national defense and security.
- Current situation in the South Atlantic, including Argentine Antarctica and the Falkland Islands (Spanish: Islas Malvinas).
- Analysis of political situations in major Latin American and European countries with the purpose of identifying instability, conflicts and crises which may cause a direct or indirect repercussion on national interests.

=== Structure ===
Internally composed of three Subsecretarías (Undersecretariats): Interior, Exterior (Foreign), and Apoyo (Support). all of its divisions have specific identification numbers assigned.

Simplified diagram of the Secretariat's structure

- Subsecretaría de Inteligencia Interior (Undersecretariat of Interior Intelligence) (8): responsible for production and dissemination of intelligence in internal areas. For this purpose, it is subdivided into several Direcciones (Directorates) which are in charge of specific political, economic and social factors.
  - Dirección de Inteligencia Interior (Directorate of Interior Intelligence): responsible for searching and collecting of information on national affairs, for which task it has technical, operational and management areas.
  - Dirección de Reunión Interior (Directorate of Internal Collection): responsible for the collection and diffusion of intelligence corresponding to the internal areas. For the achievement of its mission it is subdivided in Departments assigned to specific political, economic and social issues.
  - Dirección de Observaciones Judiciales (Directorate of Judicial Surveillance) (84): responsible for carrying out telephone, mail, and other communication interceptions mandated by judicial officers.
  - Dirección de Contrainteligencia (Directorate of Counterintelligence) (85): responsible for counterintelligence and counterespionage activities. It has intelligence and technical-operational areas which carry out specific duties.
  - Dirección de Comunicación Social (Directorate of Social Communication): responsible for the analysis and collection of public information (i.e.: mass media).
- Subsecretaría de Inteligencia Exterior (Undersecretariat of Foreign Intelligence) (3): responsible of the collection and production of intelligence on foreign areas.
  - Dirección de Reunión Exterior (Directorate of Foreign Collection): responsible for the collection and diffusion of intelligence on facts and/or processes pertaining to foreign affairs. It comprises different areas with different technical and operational targets. It is responsible for the liaison with foreign services (i.e.: intelligence delegates in foreign countries).
  - Dirección de Inteligencia Exterior (Directorate of Foreign Intelligence) (32): responsible for the production of state intelligence on the foreign area. For this purpose, it has specific areas analyzing different issues and the continental and global frame by country/country by country/in each country.
    - International Political, Economical and Social Processes.
    - Transnational Crime and International Terrorism (34)
    - Processes of the Proliferation of Weapons of Massive Destruction.
- Subsecretaría de Apoyo de Inteligencia (Undersecretariat of Support Intelligence): responsible for logistical support, staff, communications and data-processing centers of the Secretariat. In order to achieve this it has several directorates in charge of these specific areas.

=== Facilities ===
The Secretariat is a nationwide intelligence agency, and has delegations and bases in most provinces of Argentina, as well as representations in most important countries. Reports state that SIDE has about 24 operation bases around the world.

Its main building is located in Ave. 25 de Mayo 11 (with a backdoor access through Ave. Leandro N. Alem 10), at the heart of Downtown Buenos Aires, near to the Presidential Palace and Plaza de Mayo. Although the central base is the 25 de Mayo building and annexes, many buildings, known as bases or operation centers, are spread throughout the city of Buenos Aires. There are reports that the main building is also connected to the Casa Rosada, which is across the street, through an underground passage.

The main building was built in 1929 by architect Alejandro Bustillo, for the original owner Federico L. Martínez de Hoz. Inaugurated in 1930, was originally used as a housing called "Martinez de Hoz Building". In 1940 the federal government bought it. Valued at US$1,607,022, its street surface is 413 square meters, inside it is 5430 square meters; and it has ten floors, the fifth floor being the Secretary of Intelligence's office, and the tenth floor the special operations division.

Security on the facility is meticulously strict, the whole building is covered with dark tinted windows, and when a person approaches the door, guards inquire the visitor for his or her name and the reason of visit. Once they are approved to enter, they must go through a metal detector and be accompanied throughout the visit by a staff member who will guide the visitor through the building and provide the necessary magnetic card to access restricted areas.

Two annexes in Ave. 25 de Mayo are internally connected to the main facility thus extending the Secretariat's offices. Surveillance around the whole surroundings of the Presidential Palace and Plaza de Mayo is tight for obvious reasons. In the late 1960s, there was a serious incident when members of Montoneros breached the building and stayed inside for a whole weekend, taking objects, folders, and other sensitive material.

During the late 1970s and 1980s, the tenth floor of the Correo Central building was provided to the Secretariat to be used for mail interception.

Official list of the Secretariat's facilities
Name	Location	Details
First annex	Ave. 25 de Mayo 33	Constructed: 1931. Style: Art deco. Street surface: 285 m2. Internal surface: 6.000 m2. Estimated monetary value: U$S 2.049.256. Backdoor access: Ave. Leandro N. Alem 14.
Second annex	Ave. 25 de Mayo 35/37	Constructed: 1965. Street surface: 364 m2. Internal surface: 6.000 m2. Estimated monetary value: U$S 2.049.256. Backdoor access: Ave. Leandro N. Alem.
Pasaje Barolo	Ave. de Mayo 1366/70/80	Offices on the 8th floor. Annex of the Counterintelligence directorate.
Estados Unidos base (85, Counterintelligence)	Ave. Estados Unidos 3057	Constructed: 1967. Modified: 1983. Street surface: 838 m2. Internal surface: 1.568 m2. Estimated monetary value: U$S 121.812.
Billinghurst base (22, Interior Intelligence)	Ave. Billinghurst 2484	Street surface: 1.266 m2. Estimated monetary value: U$S 164.468.
Transnational Crime and International Terrorism (34)	Ave. Coronel Díaz 2079	Constructed: 1981. Street surface: 314 m2. Internal surface: 794 m2. Estimated monetary value: U$S 311.459.
Directorate of Judicial Surveillance (84)	Ave. de los Incas 3834	Internal surface: 2.500 m2. Estimated monetary value: U$S 1.577.443.
National Intelligence School	Ave. Libertad 1235	Constructed: 1922. Parking lot added in 1970. Small rooms, wooden floors. Style: Academic. Street surface: 2.515 m2. Internal surface: 3.775 m2. Estimated monetary value: U$S $724.178.
Aeropuerto Ministro Pistarini (Ezeiza International Airport) and Aeroparque Jorge Newbery (Buenos Aires Domestic Airport)		Surveillance bases depending from the counterintelligence directorate.
Chubut delegation	Hipolito Yrigoyen 1126, Trelew	Province of Chubut
Mendoza delegation	Montevideo 531, Mendoza	Province of Mendoza
Santa Cruz delegation	Urquiza 80, Rio Gallegos	Province of Santa Cruz
Note: all addresses are in Buenos Aires unless otherwise specified.

Other facilities of unknown status:

Location	Province
Ave. de Mayo 1370. 6th floor; 133rd office	Buenos Aires.
Einstein 55, Nueva Pompeya	Buenos Aires.
Coronel Cetz 68, San Isidro	Province of Buenos Aires.
España 2953, PB (lower floor), Olavarría	Province of Buenos Aires.
Juan Zufriategui 4352, Villa Martelli	Province of Buenos Aires.
Alvear 66, Córdoba	Province of Córdoba

=== Infrastructure ===
Communications in the agency are a crucial infrastructure and policy issue. For the southern bases in Patagonia, communications is provided by the Servicios y Tecnologia S.R.L. (SyT) company. The rest of SIDE's communications, phone tapping abilities, data transfer, etc. are handled by Telecom and Telefónica of Argentina, Movistar, Nextel, CTI Móvil, and Compañía de Radiocomuncaciones Móviles, S.A. Data processing computers for SIDE are provided by Bull.

In 2001, under Secretary of Intelligence Fernando de Santibañes, the Secretariat began a major upgrade of its computer infrastructure.

=== Personnel ===
Recent reports (since the Secretariat does not declare the exact number of personnel it embodies) state that about 2,500 to 3,000 agents are currently working both inside and outside of Argentina for the Secretariat. Only the Secretary and the Undersecretary of Intelligence are public functionaries, the rest of SIDE personnel must act and work secretly, as stated by the Intelligence Reform Law 25.520.

About 80% of the personnel works in areas dependant of the Interior Undersecretariat, and the remaining on the Exterior and Support Undersecretariats. According to the agent's rank, they get paid from 1.800 to 2.678 Argentine Pesos a month; directors, reach $3.000 ARS.

Delegates abroad are inserted in the frame of the Ministry of Foreign Relations, but receive monthly salaries by the Secretariat. Their job mainly consists of producing reports on current events of interests in the country they are stationed in, as well as establishing links with the local intelligence services.

=== Recruitment ===
Citizens are recruited into SIDE using a well-known and widely used method by worldwide intelligence agencies during the Cold War. The procedure was simple, recruiting students from national universities based on an assessment of their character, behavior and intelligence.

The method was first used during the Onganía government, under the command of Secretary of Intelligence Gral. Señorans, who himself said "a person who enters at 20 years of age having studied in a university, should be an excellent professional at 30 years of age". During the process of recruitment, experts focused on four essential points when assessing their targets:

- Language and expressivity.
- Discretion in the way they dress.
- A meticulous way of life.
- Possession of personal life experiences allowing them to adapt their personality to different situations.

When students accepted the invitation to join SIDE, they were sent to be trained in the National Intelligence School. Nevertheless, not all spies were chosen from universities; it was common that experienced agents recommended people they dealt with their personal life, and who they thought were apt to develop a career in the world of intelligence.

Spies recruited that way were classified as "confidents", they received a monthly pay while their abilities to carry out espionage activities were being tested. Once confidents proved that they could be trusted they were promoted to the "contracted collaborators" category. In those cases, agents were targets of specific controls, an "ambiental" surveillance on them done by the counter-intelligence division.

If agents met their superiors' expectations, they signed a temporary work contract which was renewable periodically. In the "confident" career, the third step was denominated "temporary personnel" (Personal Temporario, in Spanish), as soon as they reached that stage, they were allowed to take courses in the National Intelligence School.

Finally, after two years of being assigned as temporary personnel, they were reassigned as permanent "civil personnel" (PC, in Spanish). There was not a specified period of time between the steps of a "confident" and "civil personnel", there were cases of people who took 15 years before they were fully integrated. Today SIDE is rumored to be a "very closed family", one which nobody enters without a recommendation. Interviews with agents state that "the first rule is to forget your name", and that new personnel are baptized with a fake identity.

=== Associates ===
'Associates' are companies used for support in covert operations, known cases detailed by Argentine justice include masquerade companies such as: Tecnit, CF COM, OSGRA S.R.L, Tiumayú S.A, AMSUD S.A, EMCOSUD S.A, IDIS (Instituto de Investigaciones y Servicios) S.R.L, and Canteras Brandsen S.R.L. Apparently all of them are run by SIDE personnel, and are used for covert operations inside of Argentina, and as well to set up agents in foreign countries. One known example is that of an agent acting as a broker of EMCOSUD in Santiago de Chile.

== Culture ==
The Secretary and Undersecretary of Intelligence are referred as "Señor Cinco" (Mr. Five) and "Señor Ocho" (Mr. Eight) respectively, because of the location of their offices, the fifth and eight floor of the 25 de Mayo building. Other aliases include "Señor Tres" (Mr. Three) for the Undersecretary of Foreign Intelligence and "Señor Nueve" (Mr. Nine) for the Undersecretary of Logistics. Cafeterias in buildings of the Secretariat are referred to as "casinos".

Although unconfirmed, the name "Señor Cinco" is alleged to the 1956 restructuring of SIDE, closely modelled on the British MI6 whose first director was Captain Sir George Mansfield Smith-Cumming. Often dropping the "Smith", Cumming used his initial "C" as a codename which was also used by all subsequent directors of MI6. The name "Señor Cinco" was allegedly adapted from it.

The main building in Ave. 25 de Mayo is referred to as "Central". Agents working for SIDE call the Secretariat simply "La Casa" (The House). Foreign personnel whose function is to act as a link between their agency and SIDE are referred as "COI". Also, spies are sometimes referred by politicians as "Servis", meaning somebody pertaining to "The Service" (in English).

The official mascot of SIDE is the Fox (Zorro). Among SIDE personnel the Dirección de Observaciones Judiciales (Directorate of Judicial Surveillance, DOJ) is referred to as "Ojota" (Sandal); furthermore, "Ojota" implies "Ojo" (Eye).

=== Numbers ===
An interesting and sometimes confusing fact about the Secretariat's internal organization is the use of a specially structured sequence of numbers to refer to different internal divisions. For example, the Undersecretariat of Interior Intelligence is numbered '8', and its dependencies, such as the Directorates of Counterintelligence and Judicial Surveillance are numbered '84' and '85' respectively. The same case applies for the Undersecretariat of Exterior Intelligence, or '3', its divisions go from '32' for the Directorate of Foreign Intelligence to '34' for the Division of Transnational Crime and International Terrorism.

Even though it is still hard to discern how exactly SIDE's number sequence is structured because of the lack of an official explanation, it is known that single numbers used to refer to a certain director, '3', '5', '8', '9'. Sometimes the numbers represent their location in the 25 de Mayo buildings.

=== Public media and fiction ===
As with most intelligence agencies, the Secretariat only makes public statements when dealing with national issues or scandals. For the Secretariat, the AMIA investigation, the Sofía Fijman incident, and the participation in the Senate Bribes scandal were the most notorious episodes of media attention.

During the AMIA investigation, Claudio Lifschitz, a judicial employee involved in the investigation wrote a book about his experiences and theories that the Secretariat knew beforehand about the bombing and could not stop it.

In 2005, Tiempo de Valientes, a comedy made by Damián Szifron dealt with the age old rivalry between the Secretariat and the Federal Police. The Secretariat had a major role in the film's plot, it was portrayed as containing very sinister and corrupt individuals for the most part. In the end, the movie vindicates the role of intelligence in the national government.

In the American ABC TV show Alias, Nadia Santos (Mía Maestro) is an ex-SIDE agent who now works for the CIA. 'Argentine intelligence' was referenced several times in the show.

=== Publications ===
Every three months, SIDE publishes an official magazine through the National Intelligence School.

Books dedicated to the Secretariat's history and scandals include Los sospechosos de siempre: Historia del espionaje en la Argentina by Jorge Boimvaser. The book was to be published in 1995, but then Secretary of Intelligence Hugo Anzorreguy allegedly made a monetary deal with its author and Editorial Planeta to hold off on the book's publication. The book was finally published in 2001, and actually is one of the most complete sources of information about historical SIDE facts, even though it elegantly evades a clear definition of its inner structure.

In July 2006, SIDE: La Argentina secreta by Gerardo Young was published. Young's book is aimed towards more personal aspects of the Secretariat, such as its most famous members, internal rules, and details about its management and operations.

== Historical operations ==
=== Dirty War ===
The SIDE played a role during the Dirty War and participated in Operation Condor, the international network of South American intelligence agencies. A secret detention camp for Operation Condor in Buenos Aires, known as Automotores Orletti (also known as Tactical Operations Centre 18), functioned under the orders of SIDE from May to November 1976.

One of the most important operations carried out by SIDE was the planning of a triple assassination attempt in Europe with the collaboration of the Chilean DINA, and the Uruguayan intelligence service. The objective was to murder, if possible at the same time, three special personalities living in Paris, France: Isabel Allende (daughter of Salvador Allende, Chile), Rodolfo Matarollo (member of the ERP, Argentina), and Enrique Erro (ex-senator, Uruguay), all of them opposed the South American de facto regimes, and well known dissidents. The idea was originally suggested by DINA director Manuel Contreras, and was planned out in the Billinghurst base in Buenos Aires, previous approval of Argentine dictator Jorge Rafael Videla.

The assassinations were to be carried with 9 mm or .22 caliber guns brought to France via Argentine diplomatic carriage. The operation failed due to the Argentine Ambassador in Paris's reluctance to give the bag to the agents without first revealing what was in it.

=== Operation Marylin ===
When Héctor José Cámpora assumed the presidency of Argentina on May 25, 1973, Cuba sent a wave of diplomats and official delegates to Argentina, proposing that was the time to resume cultural interchanges with the Argentine government. However, the Argentine intelligence services distrusted the real motives for the influx of the Cubans.

It was then that an analyst in the Secretariat discovered a human weakness in the Cuban delegates: their extreme sensitivity for blonde women that stood out. The Café La Biela in the neighbourhood of Recoleta was a common place for the Cubans to be spotted hunting for their female counterparts by SIDE agents.

The Secretariat orchestrated a plan to infiltrate, assess and obtain information as fast as can be possible. In this operation, the main actors would be blonde women, SIDE began recruiting capable women in known 'hot' spots of the city, some of them managed by people closely connected with the Secretariat.

Three women were cited for an interview in downtown Buenos Aires, proposed a job opportunity that involved establishing a solid and stable link with the Cuban delegates, all accepted. They would be paid almost the same money they earned at their previous jobs, plus a few honoraries for the services provided. During a week, the agents were taught basic intelligence theories and practices, they observed photographs of the Cubans they were going to 'mark', and they had time to elaborate complex backstories for their supposed identities.

The director in charge of Operation Marylin selected divorced women with children on purpose, so they would not raise any suspicions in their families or targets. The three females claimed to work doing 'sales' for a living, allowing them to be available at many hours in which to be in direct contact with the Cubans. Finally, after a subtle approximation scene played out in Café La Biela, two of the Cuban delegates fell for the trap, but the third one apparently was not interested in establishing relations.

After six weeks of observations and wire-taps (the spies made sure to plant the Cubans' rooms with microphones), the Cuban embassy unexpectedly ordered its delegates to return to Havana. SIDE did not obtain any relevant information about their suspicions that the Cubans were assisting and supporting Argentine leftists groups, but the agency realised that women are a very useful tool in the espionage world. All three females that participated in the operation were offered permanent jobs in SIDE; only one accepted, the rest went back to the Buenos Aires night scene.

Operation Marylin proved that using women to exploit weaknesses in men was a feasible and convenient method of extracting information, and observating both foreign and internal adversaries of Argentina. Although the real insertion of females into the Argentine espionage community started in the mid-1960s, during the '70s, one of Argentina's most agitated eras, the women of SIDE started playing a crucial role in its operations.

=== Operation Veinte Años ===
On October 28, 1995, Enrique Gorriarán Merlo, Argentina's most wanted terrorist, was captured in the little town of Tepoztlán, 60 miles away Mexico City, and extradited back to Argentina. Merlo had been involved in numerous criminal activities during the 1970s and 1980s, most notably the assassination of Anastasio Somoza Debayle on September 17 in Paraguay, and for orchestrating the 1989 attack on the La Tablada military barracks by the MTP group.

Merlo, who claims it was a kidnapping orchestrated by SIDE, had traveled to Mexico to meet with Mexican politicians of the PRD, who were cooperating in an international push to free the guerrillas responsible for the La Tablada attack who were, and still are, serving prison term in Argentine jails. Merlo arrived in the Mexican capital with a fake Uruguayan passport, where he soon realized that the Mexican security forces were following him. He thought they were just doing basic surveillance on him to see if he was doing any illegal activity in Mexican territory.

On Saturday, October 28, he spotted three Argentine-looking men in Tepoztlán Square, "one of which -he said- looked like he was from the Argentine intelligence service or the police". Merlo was driving a friend's truck, after spotting the Argentines, he tried to lose his entourage of followers by driving into the town of Cuatula. A few minutes later, Merlo claims he was stopped, surrounded, and shot several times until he put his hands out the truck's destroyed window.

Merlo goes on to claim that the Mexican security services handcuffed him, and made him face the Argentine, who nodded silently (affirming that he was who they were looking for).

Merlo was taken into the Mexican Migrations Department, where he claims was interrogated three times by SIDE agents. The last time they interrogated him, they asked if he was Gorriarán Merlo, he answered back "yes", and simultaneously asked for asylum. (Mexico has a tradition for giving asylum to politically prosecuted people in other Latin American countries). One of the Mexican police man told them that there was "receptiveness" about his request, but at five in the morning, Mexican authorities took him to the airport and put in him in SIDE's plane, where the same SIDE agent from Tepoztlán and the interrogation was present.

The operation was allegedly carried out by the Sala Patria group of the Secretariat. Gorrarián Merlo served prison time in Argentina for his crimes, and was later pardoned in 2003 by President Eduardo Duhalde.

=== AMIA investigation ===
Judicial reports during the investigation have displayed sufficient evidence of SIDE's involvement in the AMIA case investigation. In 2003, President Néstor Kirchner signed a decree that opened all SIDE's files (about 15,000) and allowed the ex-Secretary of Intelligence, Hugo Anzorreguy, and many intelligence personnel involved in the case (including Horacio Antonio Stiusso, Patricio Miguel Finnen, and Alejandro Brousson) to be available to declare in the investigation about Judge Galeano's mishandling during his job as official judge of the case.

Several critics blame SIDE for failing to stall the attack on the AMIA as the warnings of an impending attack on Argentine soil were received. Judicial evidence presented during the AMIA investigation show that the Argentine Embassy in Beirut, the Brazilian Intelligence Service, and the Argentine Consulate in Milan warned SIDE about the attack on the Jewish organization.

=== Operation Cabildo ===
Juan José Galeano, the judge in charge of the AMIA Bombing investigation, asked Hugo Anzorreguy to help him advance the investigation by bribing a key witness who refused to testify, Carlos Telledín. The Secretariat provided 400 thousand dollars so he would change his testimony, thus forcing progress on a case that had been stuck for two years.

SIDE explicitly participated in the operation to give the money to Telledín's wife, Ana Boragni in a Lloyds Bank located on Ave. Cabildo in Buenos Aires. The public importance about this operation is that it explicitly implied SIDE working to orchestrate a cover-up in the AMIA case.

The operation was described thoroughly by SIDE agents who testified later on, during President Néstor Kirchner's push for new leads on the case.

=== Surveillance of foreign embassies ===
During the 1960s, SIDE set up constant surveillance on embassies from the Eastern bloc as well as other communist nations in Buenos Aires.

During the investigation of the AMIA case, then counter-intelligence operations director Horacio Antonio Stiusso, was asked about why SIDE had been tapping the phone lines and setting bugs in the embassies of Iran and Cuba in Buenos Aires. Stiusso alleged that those tasks were simply counter-intelligence operations and had no relationship with the AMIA case. Nevertheless, in 1998, Argentina fired many Iranian diplomats on the basis of "phone taps" that provided evidence Iran was involved in the AMIA bombing.

=== Sofía Fijman incident ===
In the late 1990s, an employee of the Secretariat in charge of the National Intelligence School's security was convicted of murder. For more information see the School's incidents.

=== Operation Ciprés ===
In the late nineties, Nasrim Mokhtari an Iranian prostitute and hairdresser, who was believed to be involved with an Iranian support group that helped carry out the bombings of the Israeli Embassy in 1992, and the AMIA building in 1994, was tricked by the Secretariat into coming back to Argentina from Europe.

The information on her involvement came from Wilson Dos Santos, a suspect in the AMIA case. Dos Santos was a Brazilian taxi boy and thief who did a significant amount of smuggling in the Triple Frontier. Mokhtari had a romantic relationship with Dos Santos in Buenos Aires, and claims he knew about the plot to bomb the AMIA building through her connection in the Buenos Aires islamic community. It is suspected that Dos Santos worked, or works for the Brazilian Intelligence Service, or the Brazilian Police.

Furthermore, a few weeks before the bombing, Dos Santos entered the Argentine, Israeli, and Brazilian consulates in Milán, Italy, to warn about the upcoming attacks. There was no trace of him until he was captured in Switzerland years later, holding 8 passports, and extradited to Argentina on charges of false testimony, of which he is currently serving prison time.

When Dos Santos was declared for the Argentine justice ministry, even though there were weak points in his statements, he named Mokhtari and alleged she knew about the bombings (he later testified that he warned the consulates on information he got from her).

The Argentine justice system, needing new leads because of all the pressure put on them to solve both bombings, ordered SIDE to find Mokhtari and bring her back to Argentina for interrogation. A plan codenamed Operation Ciprés was orchestrated to locate her in Europe and bring her back to Argentina. Once located in Switzerland, she was conned into coming back to Argentina by SIDE agents, who posed as meat businessmen who proposed her a job as a translator to do business with Iran.

The operation was carried out by the Sala Patria group, and it has been said that the operation cost the Secretariat about half a million dollars, which included locating her, paying costs, agents and buying information in Cyprus, France, Belgium and Switzerland. The French intelligence service also helped SIDE locate Mokhtari while she was living in Paris, France.

Mokthari was on an Air France flight to Montevideo, Uruguay, that made a stop in Buenos Aires. When she got off to change planes, she was arrested by a special counter-terrorism team of the Federal Police. Mokhtari was eventually set free; there were no sufficient proofs to incriminate her in anything, or even of involvement in the Iranian support group that carried out the AMIA bombing.

A restriction on leaving the country was imposed on her, and later lifted, but Nasrim Mokhtari had already lost her contacts in Paris, had no money, and become a publicly known 'international terrorist'. The Secretariat declined to provide sufficient accommodations for Mokhtari to stay in Argentina, and Iran did not want her in its territory because of the sufficient international problems she brought to them with Iran being blamed in participating in the AMIA bombing. She is currently hospitalized at a mental institution in Buenos Aires.

=== Breakdown of CIA relations ===
In January 2001, Página/12 newspaper published an article on the Secretariat's troubled relations with the American Central Intelligence Agency (CIA). Along with the article was a photo of and personal details about Ross Newland, then CIA Station Chief in Buenos Aires, who was expected to become head of the Latin American division in the CIA. Official reports say that the CIA wanted SIDE to investigate the operations of the Russian Mafia and ex-KGB agents who had just arrived in Argentina. The reasons were that the Russian Mafia was using Argentina as an intermediate country for smuggling illegal aliens to the U.S. At the time, Argentina did not require visas for tourist visits to the United States, and obtaining Argentine citizenship had recently been relatively easy.

Other reasons to investigate the recently arrived ex-KGB and Russian Mafia was that many ex-CIA and ex-FBI personnel had private security businesses in Argentina and in many other Latin American countries. The arrival of the Russian gang in Argentina put their businesses at risk of competition. A few months before, Newland, a 50-year-old who loved living in Buenos Aires accused SIDE of following him and fellow CIA operatives in Argentina, as well as doing audio surveillance on them.

Information leaked out that Patricio Finnen and Alejandro Brousson, two old notorious important staff members of the Secretariat, were responsible for carrying out the operation from the Billinghurst base. The Americans were not the only ones affected by the Secretariat's peculiar attention; this was also true of the Israeli Mossad and the German Federal Intelligence Service (BND).

American reports state that the Secretariat never helped the CIA on its requests, instead, the U.S. alleged that SIDE helped the "newcomers" insert themselves in the market by selling them information. The CIA became furious since they had historically contributed funds for SIDE to do their operations, and SIDE was indirectly helping the Russians in their smuggling operation. They expected the Secretariat to be on their side, and to make the 'Russian problem' a government issue, therefore putting pressure on the Russians.

The head of the Secretariat's counter-intelligence service at the time, retired Major Alejandro Broussoun, an ex-military serviceman from the Argentine Army Engineers Corps, and an ex-follower of the ultra-nationalist right wing Carapintadas organization in the 1980s and 1990s, was blamed by the CIA for the leak of the identity of their station chief to the popular newspaper.

The United States investigation into the incident with SIDE, revealed that the picture and information of Ross Newland was given to the newspaper by the Secretariat itself. Meanwhile, SIDE tried to repair relations by explaining the scandal by another theory.

At the end of the scandal, with Ross Newland's identity uncovered and the episode becoming a major embarrassment for the U.S. and Argentina in the worldwide intelligence community, the CIA removed its Station Chief from Argentina, and said they were going to permanently move their offices to Montevideo, Uruguay because of their problems working together with SIDE. Also, as a result of this, the head of the SIDE counter-intelligence service, retired Major Alejandro Brousson was expelled because of the American diplomatic pressure to punish the responsible of an act they considered "a violation of game rules" (in the intelligence community, that is).

The scandal not only put a stain in the CIA's relations with SIDE, but also made the Americans distrust the Argentine intelligence community which they had come to collaborate extensively during the Carlos Menem administration.

=== Bribes in the Senate ===
In 2001, the government under President Fernando de la Rúa used the Secretariat's reserved funds to orchestrate the bribery of several senators in the Argentine Congress. The motive behind the operation was to assure the promotion of a labor reform law that De La Rúa was promoting. When the level of involvement of the Executive Branch became known to the public, a national scandal broke out and De La Rúa's administration took heavy criticism.

The Secretariat was then under the command of banker Fernando de Santibañes, a close friend of then President De La Rúa, who promised to make sweeping changes to the Secretariat of Intelligence. The opposition parties in Argentina, specially during the government of Carlos Menem, saw SIDE as a political tool and promised sweeping reforms if they won the 1999 presidential elections.

After the details of the participation of SIDE in the scandal became publicly known, then President Fernando de la Rúa asked Fernando De Santibañes to resign. He was charged with participating in the Senate bribes case.

In 2013, a Federal Jury found that President De la Rua and Fernando de Santibañes, together with other officials and senators, were innocent of the allegations.

=== Assassination of Piqueteros ===
The Justice system and the press blame the Secretariat participating in the organization of events in 2002 that led to the deaths of Darío Santillán and Maximiliano Kosteki, two piqueteros who were protesting on the Pueyrredón Bridge in Buenos Aires. Both men were shot in the back by Buenos Aires Police's officers armed with shotguns.

Months before the tragedy, the Secretariat had produced intelligence reports that the Piqueteros' assemblies and protests were being attended by the Colombian extremist group FARC. Furthermore, minutes before the assassinations, there were three phone calls, between Alfredo Fanchiotti, a policeman involved in the incident, and the Undersecretary of Intelligence, at the time, Oscar Rodríguez.

During the trial, police officers involved in the scene that day, declared that a man from SIDE approached them and told them that "Today there will be incidents", furthermore incriminating the Secretariat on the assassinations.

Carlos Soria, then Secretary of State Intelligence, later declared that "democracy works in order, we needed to establish order", making the public theory that the assassinations were orchestrated by SIDE to psychologically reduce the Piqueteros movements motivation and their influence in Argentine society.

The assassinations, which sparked outrage by Piquetero groups, made then interim President Eduardo Duhalde to call for elections earlier than planned, and since then, the federal government has established a non-repressive policy towards the Piqueteros.

In 2005, President Néstor Kirchner, signed a decree that released all of the Secretariats's files about the tragedy to the public, and made some SIDE staff and agents available for questioning if necessary.

Nobody in SIDE has yet been charged with participating in the case. On the second anniversary of the assassinations, protesters and piqueteros marched towards the Billinghurst base were the phone calls originated and proceeded to deface the property and manifest public outrage towards the organization. It was the first time ever people protested at one of SIDE's facilities.

== Secretaries and Directors ==
N.º	Secretaries and Directors	Period
Coordinación de Informaciones de Estado
1	Rodolfo Freude	June 4, 1946 - August 21, 1955
2	Juan Constantino Quaranta	September 21, 1955 - May 1, 1958
Secretaría de Informaciones del Estado
3	Juan Carlos Varela	May 1, 1958 - March 29, 1962
4	Ernesto Taquini	March 29, 1962 - October 12, 1963
5	Medardo Gallardo Valdez	October 12, 1963 - June 28, 1966
6	Roberto Marcelo Levingston	June 28, 1966 - November 11, 1968
7	Eduardo Argentino Señorans	November 11, 1968 - March 22, 1971
8	Carlos Alberto Martínez	March 22, 1971 - May 25, 1973
9	Augusto Morello	May 25, 1973 - January 20, 1974
10	Jorge Oscar Montiel	January 20, 1974 - March 24, 1976
Secretaría de Inteligencia del Estado
11	Otto Carlos Paladino	March 24, 1976 - December 9, 1976
12	Carlos Enrique Laidlaw	December 9, 1976 - January 18, 1978
13	Carlos Alberto Martínez	January 18, 1978 - December 10, 1983
14	Roberto Manuel Pena	December 10, 1983 - January 1, 1986
15	Facundo Roberto Suárez	January 1, 1986 - July 8, 1989
16	Juan Bautista Yofre	July 8, 1989 - January 30, 1990
17	Hugo Anzorreguy	January 30, 1990 - December 10, 1999
18	Fernando de Santibañes	December 10, 1999 - October 23, 2000
19	Carlos Becerra	October 23, 2000 - December 20, 2001
Secretaría de Inteligencia
20	Carlos Sergnese	December 20, 2001 - January 2, 2002
21	Carlos Ernesto Soria	January 2, 2002 - July 10, 2002
22	Miguel Ángel Toma	July 10, 2002 - May 25, 2003
23	Sergio Acevedo	May 25, 2003 - December 10, 2003
24	Héctor Icazuriaga	December 10, 2003 - December 16, 2014
25	Oscar Parrilli	December 16, 2014 -December 10, 2015
Agencia Federal de Inteligencia
26	Gustavo Arribas	December 10, 2015 - December 10, 2019
27	Cristina Caamaño	December 10, 2019 - June 6, 2022
28	Agustín Rossi	June 8, 2022 - February 5, 2023
29	Ana Clara Alberdi	February 15, 2023 - December 10, 2023
30	Silvestre Sívori	December 12, 2023 - May 27, 2024
31	Sergio Neiffert	July 15, 2024 - Present

== See also ==
- Argentine intelligence agencies
- Directorate of Judicial Surveillance
- List of secretaries of intelligence of Argentina
- National Directorate of Criminal Intelligence
- National Directorate of Strategic Military Intelligence
- National Intelligence School
- National Intelligence System
