= Olijela del Valle Rivas =

Argentine politician (1926–2024)

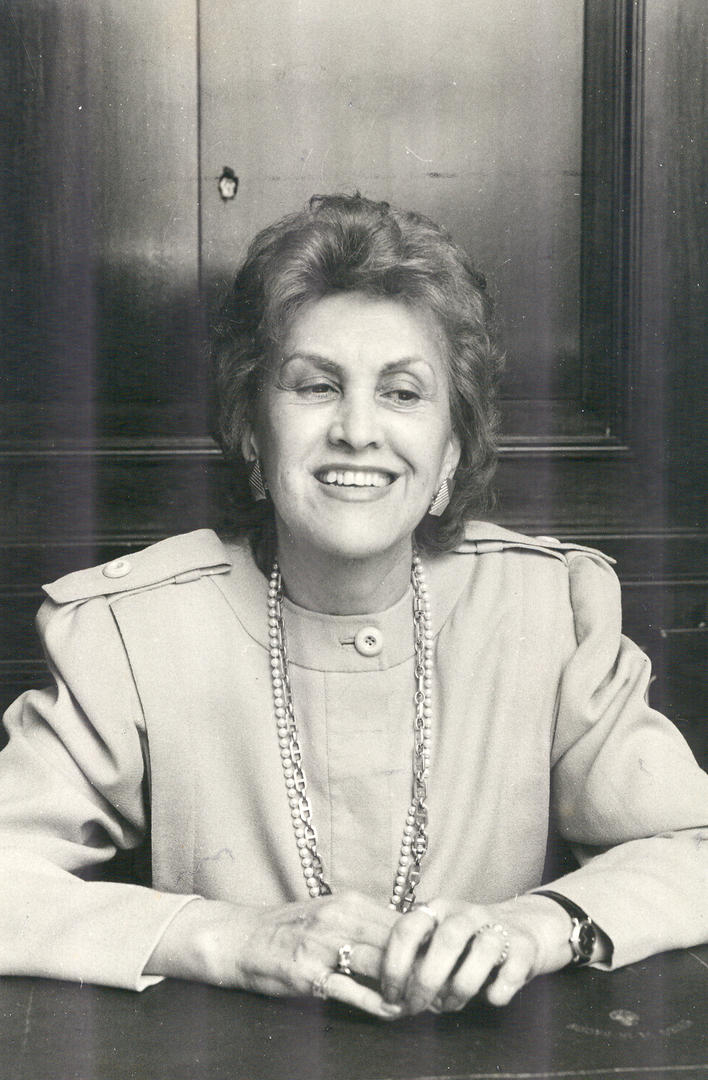

Member of the Legislature of Tucumán
- In office 10 December 2003 – 10 December 2011

Member of the Argentine Chamber of Deputies
- In office 10 December 1999 – 10 December 2003
- Constituency: Tucumán Province

Secretary for International Educational Cooperation and Integration of the Ministry of Education
- In office 16 December 1998 – 10 December 1999
- President: Carlos Menem

Member of the Argentine Senate
- In office 10 December 1983 – 10 December 1998
- Succeeded by: Palito Ortega
- Constituency: Tucumán Province

Personal details
- Born: 14 April 1926 Tucumán Province, Argentina
- Died: 5 February 2024 (aged 97) San Miguel de Tucumán, Argentina
- Party: Justicialist
- Spouse: Fernando Riera (m. 1966; died 1998)
- Occupation: Teacher

Olijela del Valle Rivas (14 April 1926 – 5 February 2024) was an Argentine teacher and politician of the Justicialist Party.

== Biography ==
Olijela del Valle Rivas was born in Tucumán Province in 1926. She was the first female principal and teacher at the 9 de Julio Institute in San Miguel de Tucumán, founded in 1967.

In 1962, while working as a teacher, she met Fernando Riera, a 47-year-old Justicialist politician who was campaigning for governor. They were married from 1966 until his death in 1998. She was a national senator for Tucumán Province from 1983 to 1998, succeeded in her seat by Ramón "Palito" Ortega. In the Senate, she served on eleven committees.

In 1995, Rivas was a candidate for governor in the provincial elections for the Front of Hope, together with José Carbonell. They finished in second place with 32.08% of the votes, losing to former military governor Antonio Domingo Bussi.

In December 1998, she was appointed head of the Ministry of Education's Secretariat for International Educational Cooperation and Integration. This position was created by Decree 1460/98 by then-president Carlos Menem, days after Rivas left her seat in the Senate. Previously, Rivas was to be appointed the ministry's Secretary of Educational Programming and Evaluation, but the incumbent, Manuel García Solá, refused to resign and was supported by Minister Susana Decibe.

From 1999 to 2003, Rivas was a member of the Chamber of Deputies for the Justicialist Agreement for Change front, heading its list of candidates.

She was then a provincial legislator and chaired the Culture and Education Committee. In 2006, she was a provincial constituent convention member, where she proposed adding electronic voting to the provincial constitution.

In the 2007 provincial elections, she was unable to run with the Front for Victory in spite of filing legal challenges before local and federal courts; she was re-elected to her seat by another party.

Olijela del Valle Rivas died in San Miguel de Tucumán on 5 February 2024.
