= Hugo Anzorreguy =

Argentine politician

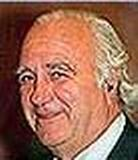
Hugo Anzorreguy

Hugo Alfredo Anzorreguy Recobiche (born July 10, 1938) was the Secretary of Intelligence of the Argentine Republic from January 30, 1990 to December 10, 1999, during most of Carlos Menem's presidency. At nine years, Anzorreguy was the longest serving Secretary of Intelligence, and was the head of SIDE during some of its most scandalous years.

Anzorreguy was born in the city of Buenos Aires, where he studied to be a lawyer. He was indicted in the AMIA Bombing case for tampering with evidence, and sentenced to 4.5 years in prison in March 2019, a sentence which was upheld in 2024.

Preceded by Juan Bautista Yofre	Secretary of Intelligence; 1990–1999	Succeeded by Jorge de la Rúa

== See also ==
- List of secretaries of intelligence of Argentina
