= Silvia Majdalani =

Argentine politician (born 1958)

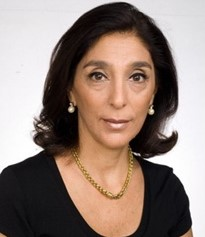

Vice-director of the Federal Intelligence Agency of Argentina
- In office 10 December 2015 – 10 December 2019
- President: Mauricio Macri
- Preceded by: Juan Martín Mena

National Deputy
- In office 10 December 2009 – 10 December 2015

Legislator of the City of Buenos Aires
- In office 10 December 2003 – 10 December 2009

Personal details
- Born: 2 November 1958 (age 67) Belgrano, Buenos Aires
- Party: Republican Proposal
- Education: University of Belgrano; Argentine University of Enterprise

Silvia Cristina Majdalani (born 2 November 1958) is an Argentine politician. A member of Republican Proposal (PRO), she served as deputy director of the Federal Intelligence Agency during the presidency of Mauricio Macri. Majdalani was a member of the Argentine Chamber of Deputies from 2009 to 2015.

== Biography ==
Majdalani was born on 2 November 1958 was born in the neighborhood of Belgrano, into a family of Lebanese origin. She finished high school at St. Catherine's School, where she attained a national high school degree in Arts and Science.

Once she finished high school, she studied social communication and business administration at the University of Belgrano (UB), and Public Relations at the Argentine University of Enterprise (UADE).

== Career ==
In 2003, after working in the public and in the private sector, she was elected for the first time as Legislator of the City of Buenos Aires as part of the Commitment to Change list. She was re-elected to a second term in 2007.

In 2009, she was elected to the Chamber of Deputies of Argentina as part of the Republican Proposal list. She was a member of the parliamentary commissions on Social Action and Public Health, Transport, National Defense and Homeland Security. Majdalani was re-elected in 2013.

Since 2011, due to her specialization in the subject, she was appointed to the Bicameral Commission of Fiscalization of Intelligence Entities and Activities. On December 3, 2015, elected president Mauricio Macri announced her designation as Deputy Director of the Federal Intelligence Agency (AFI).

== See also ==
- Republican Proposal
