= María Beatriz Nofal =

Argentine economist

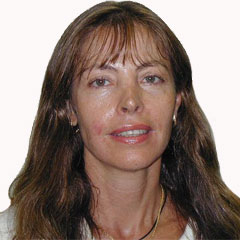
- Education: Johns Hopkins University (PhD)

María Beatriz Nofal is an Argentine economist and civil servant from Mendoza. She has been president of Argentina's National Agency for Investment Development (Spanish: la Agencia Nacional de Desarrollo de Inversiones), part of the Ministry of Economy, since October 2006. She earlier served, from January 1986 until January 1989, as Under-Secretary of Industrial Development in the office of the Secretary of Industry and Foreign Trade.

Beatriz Nofal earned a Ph.D. in economics from Johns Hopkins University in 1983. She did postgraduate work at the Institute of Social Studies and the University of Paris.

Beatriz Nofal is also the author of Absentee Entrepreneurship and the Dynamics of the Motor Vehicle Industry in Argentina, published in 1989. The book is a study of the development of the Argentine automobile industry, including "a detailed examination of the dynamics of this industry against the background of development and underdevelopment in Argentina" and an analysis of "the internal economic evolution and geography of the industry".
