= Patricio Miguel Finnen =

Argentine intelligence operative

Patricio Miguel Finnen (Alias: Patricio Fonseca) was an Argentine intelligence operative - a SIDE agent and intelligence director who became publicly known because of the AMIA bombing investigation.

Finnen was fired from the organisation in December 2001. He started working for SIDE in 1974. He was the Undersecretary of Foreign Intelligence Collection (Subsecretario de Reunión Exterior), as well as the delegate to Israel from 1989 to 1993. In 1994 he became Subdirector of Counter-intelligence. He was the head of the Sala Patria intelligence group.
