= Facundo Suárez =

Argentine politician (1923–1998)

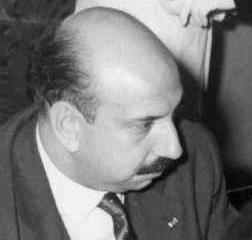
Facundo Suárez

Facundo Suárez (November 5, 1923 – August 2, 1998) was an Argentine Radical Civic Union (UCR) politician.

== Biography ==
Suárez was born in Mendoza, Argentina, in 1923. His father, Leopoldo Suárez, served as the Minister of Public Works in Mendoza Province. He enrolled at the University of La Plata, and became acquainted with Buenos Aires Province legislator Ricardo Balbín of the centrist UCR. Suárez joined the UCR in 1941, and was later elected delegate to the Argentine University Federation. He earned a law degree at La Plata, and a Doctorate in political science at the University of Cuyo. He was elected to the Mendoza Chamber of Deputies, serving from 1948 to 1952, and in 1958, to the Argentine Chamber of Deputies. He ran for governor in 1963, and was defeated by Democratic Party leader Francisco Gabrielli. The newly elected president of Argentina, Arturo Illia of the UCR, appointed Suárez chairman of the national oil company, YPF. He was one of the first UCR officials to meet the exiled populist leader, former President Juan Perón, at the latter's Puerta de Hierro residence in Madrid.

Suárez was removed from his post at YPF by the 1966 military coup against Illia. He developed a good working relationship with the banned Peronist movement, and had become a close adviser to party leader Ricardo Balbín when the dictatorship called for general elections in 1973. Balbín chose his running-mate, Fernando de la Rúa, on his advice. The UCR ticket was defeated in the 1973 elections, and Suárez did not return to active politics until a decade later, when a subsequent dictatorship called new elections. The winner of the 1983 elections, Raúl Alfonsín, had challenged Suárez's mentor, Balbín, for the leadership of the UCR in 1972. He nevertheless appointed Suárez director of Segba, the state electric utility company then serving Greater Buenos Aires. He served a stint as Ambassador to Mexico, from 1985 to 1986, and was named director of Argentine Intelligence Service.

Suárez proposed making the SIDE expense account, long a source of controversy in Argentina due to its classified nature, a matter of Congressional purview. Though the proposal was not enacted by Congress, Suárez made the agency's budget public, and during his 1986–89 tenure, this amount doubled. His tenure coincided with a number of scandals, however, including the filming of the UCR's 1989 presidential campaign television ads on a SIDE base, with employees in the background, the involvement of numerous SIDE officials in the far-right Carapintadas, and the surveillance of opposition senators for human weaknesses to be used against them in future political operations.

Following Alfonsín's departure in 1989, Suárez served in the UCR National Committee, and was elected to the 1994 Constitutional Amendments Convention. His son, Facundo Suárez Lastra, also became a politician and served as mayor of Buenos Aires from 1986 to 1989.

Suárez developed cancer, and died in Buenos Aires in 1998, at age 74.

== See also ==
- List of secretaries of intelligence of Argentina
