= Alicia Gutiérrez =

Argentine sociologist and author

Alicia Beatriz Gutiérrez (born 1957) is an Argentine sociologist and author. She is a professor and chair of the department of sociology in the Faculty of Philosophy and Humanities at the National University of Córdoba.

== Career ==
She is a professor and chair of the department of sociology in the Faculty of Philosophy and Humanities at the National University of Córdoba. Gutiérrez is an adjunct professor of anthropology in the Faculty of Philosophy and Letters at the University of Buenos Aires. She is an investigator with the National Scientific and Technical Research Council. Gutiérrez completed a doctorate in sociology at School for Advanced Studies in the Social Sciences. She was a close colleague of Pierre Bourdieu.

== Personal life and education ==
Gutiérrez was born in 1957 to first generation immigrants from Spain and Italy. Her mother was an odontologist and her father was a physician. She attended Manuel Belgrano High School. She has four children.

== Selected works ==
=== Books ===
- Gutiérrez, Alicia B. (1994). Pierre Bourdieu: las prácticas sociales (in Spanish). Centro Editor de América Latina. ISBN 9789502521596.
- Gutiérrez, Alicia B. (2012). Las prácticas sociales: Una introducción a Pierre Bourdieu (in Spanish). Eduvim. ISBN 9789871868360.
- Gutiérrez, Alicia Beatriz (2015). Pobre'... como siempre: Estrategias de reproducción social en la pobreza (in Spanish). Eduvim. ISBN 9789876992510.
