= Miguel Ángel Toma =

Argentine politician (born 1949)

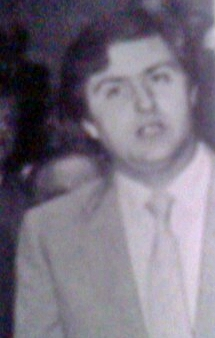

Secretary of Intelligence
- In office July 10, 2002 – May 25, 2003
- President: Eduardo Duhalde
- Preceded by: Carlos Soria
- Succeeded by: Sergio Acevedo

National Deputy
- In office December 10, 1999 – July 10, 2002
- Constituency: City of Buenos Aires
- In office December 10, 1985 – December 10, 1997
- Constituency: City of Buenos Aires

Personal details
- Born: September 18, 1949 (age 77) Buenos Aires Province, Argentina
- Party: Justicialist Party
- Spouse: Patricia Azura
- Education: Universidad del Salvador

Miguel Ángel Toma (born September 18, 1949) is an Argentine Justicialist Party politician.

== Biography ==
Toma earned degrees in philosophy and theology at the San Miguel campus of the Jesuit Universidad del Salvador. He was an early supporter of Antonio Cafiero's Peronist Renewal faction within the Justicialist Party, and was elected to the Argentine Chamber of Deputies for the City of Buenos Aires in 1985. He served in the defense and security committees. His party list lost the 1997 congressional primaries to Daniel Scioli's, however, who enjoyed the support of President Carlos Menem, and Toma consequently left Congress. Supported by close Menem adviser José Luis Manzano, Toma was appointed Secretary of Security by Menem in 1998.

Amid political crisis of December 2001, Toma was appointed Minister of Justice, Interior, Defense and Human Rights, holding all roles concurrently for just 48 hours. He was subsequently named president of the Buenos Aires Province chapter of the Justicialist Party.

Toma was the Secretary of Intelligence of Argentina from July 2002 to 2003. He was appointed by then President Eduardo Duhalde to replace the previous Secretary, Carlos Soria, following the assassination of two left-wing agitators in Avellaneda. During his tenure, the final report on the AMIA bombing was published to the judicial branch and foreign intelligence services, but would remain classified to the general public.

Toma was brought on as a campaign adviser to Buenos Aires Mayor Mauricio Macri in the latter's putative 2011 campaign for the presidency.

== See also ==
- List of secretaries of intelligence of Argentina

Government offices
Preceded by Carlos Soria	Secretary of Intelligence; 2002–2003	Succeeded by Sergio Acevedo
