= Dirección Nacional de Inteligencia Criminal =

Argentine government agency

Dirección Nacional de Inteligencia Criminal (National Directorate of Criminal Intelligence, DNIC) is an Argentine intelligence agency, part of the National Intelligence System. It used to depend on the Secretaría de Seguridad Interior (Secretariat of Interior Security), which itself depends on the Ministry of Interior; currently, the DNIC depends from the National Ministry of Security. The DNIC is not a division of the Secretaría de Inteligencia (SIDE), which has its own Directorate of Interior Intelligence.

== Creation ==
The Dirección Nacional de Inteligencia Criminal (National Directorate of Criminal Intelligence, DNIC) was initially created by the 1992 Interior Security Law 24.059 as Dirección Nacional de Inteligencia Interior (National Directorate of Interior Intelligence, DNII).

In December 2001, as the new Intelligence Reform Law 25.520 passed, the National Intelligence System was created, and Article 47/48 renamed the old DNII to its current name.

At the time of the writing of the 1992 Interior Security Law 24.059, the National Aeronautical Police (Policía Aeronáutica Nacional, PNA) was controlled by the Argentine Air Force, therefore, the handling of its information was done by military intelligence. In 2005, after the Southern Winds Narcobags Scandal, President Néstor Kirchner dissolved the PNA, and created a civil organism similar to the National Gendarmerie and the Naval Prefecture, the Airport Security Police (Policía de Seguridad Aeroportuaria, PSA). DNIC also handles intelligence from the mentioned organism that has inherited from the military-controlled PNA.

== Function ==
Its mission, as detailed on Article 16 of the 1992 Interior Security Law 24.059, is to be a federal agency within the Ministry of Interior to strategically coordinate and direct the functions and operations of the intelligence services of the Federal Police, the National Gendarmerie, and the Naval Prefecture.

== See also ==
- List of secretaries of intelligence of Argentina
- Argentine intelligence agencies
- National Intelligence System
- National Intelligence School
- Directorate of Judicial Surveillance
- Secretariat of Intelligence
- National Directorate of Strategic Military Intelligence
