= Dirección de Observaciones Judiciales =

Facade of the DOJ building in Buenos Aires.

Dirección de Observaciones Judiciales (Directorate of Judicial Surveillance, DOJ) is an Argentine intelligence service responsible for intercepting communications as required by judicial officers. It is part of the Secretaría de Inteligencia, the main intelligence agency, and a subagency of the National Intelligence System. It is known as "Division 84" or "Ojota" inside SIDE. ("O-Jota" is the Spanish pronunciation of the letters OJ.)

== Building ==
The DOJ is located in a tall, undistinguished building on Ave. de los Incas 3834, in Buenos Aires. The building has an internal surface of 27,000 square feet (2,500 m^{2}) and an estimated monetary value of US $1,577,443.

Before moving into its own building, it operated out of Telecom Argentina´s Belgrano facility.

== Mishandling allegations ==
During the past few years, there have been allegations of budget mishandlings and phone interventions without a judicial request and authorization; and about SIDE's counterintelligence service also having the capability to intercept communications.

== See also ==
- Secretariat of Intelligence
- National Intelligence System
- National Intelligence School
- Argentine intelligence agencies
- National Directorate of Criminal Intelligence
- National Directorate of Strategic Military Intelligence
