= Oscar Parrilli =

Argentine lawyer and politician

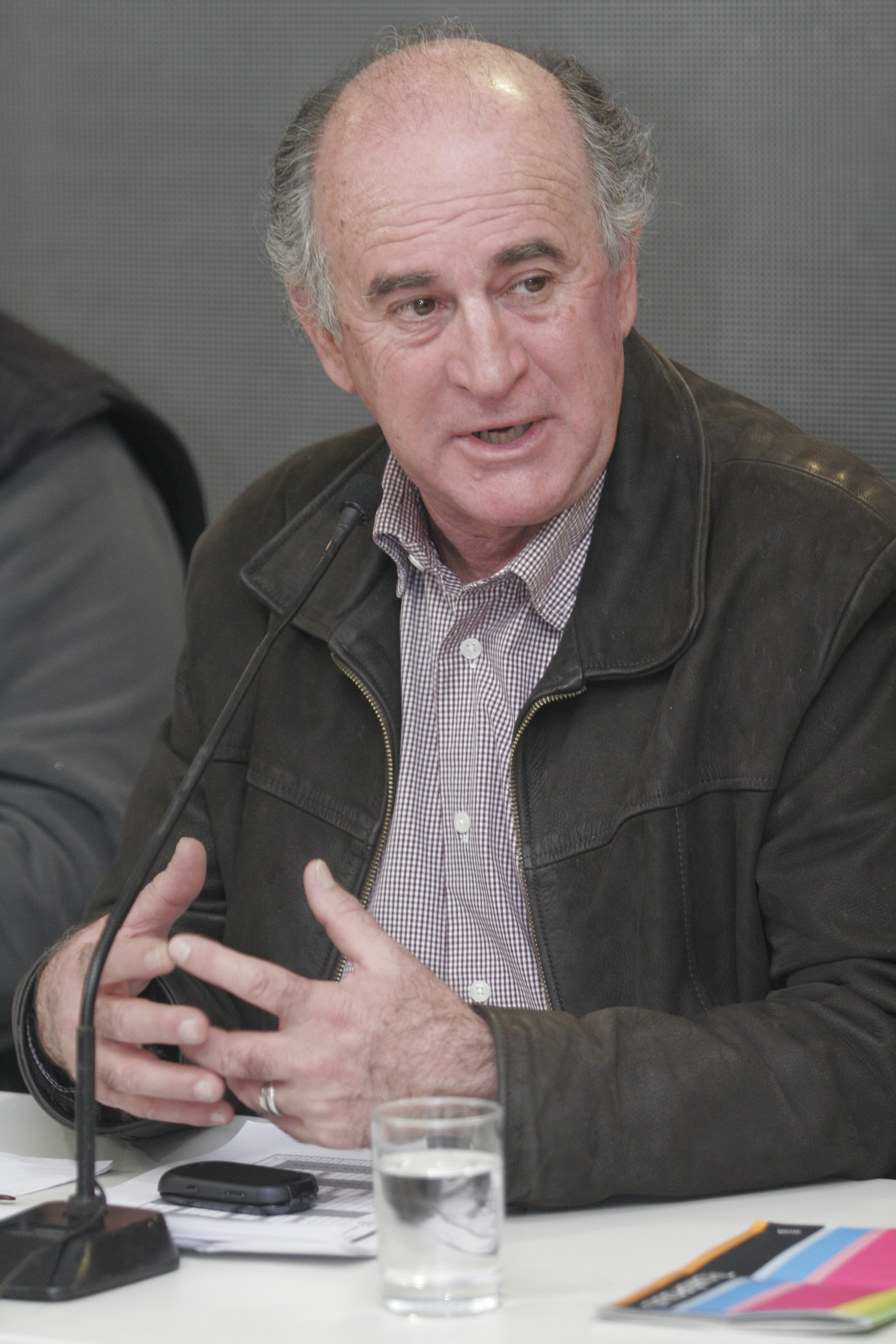
Oscar Parrilli

Oscar Isidro Parrilli (born 13 August 1951) is an Argentine lawyer and politician, member of the Justicialist Party.

Oscar Parrilli is a National Senator. He was born in San Martín de Los Andes, Neuquén province in 1951 and studied law at the University of Buenos Aires.

He obtained his law degree in 1976 from the University of Buenos Aires and specialized in Commercial Societies and business management at the Universidad del Comahue. He is married and has four children.In 2003, President Néstor Kirchner designated him General Secretary of Presidency.

In 1982, at the end of the dictatorship that interrupted his activism, he founded the Arturo Jauretche Athenaeum. With the return to democracy, he was elected congressman in the Legislature of the province of Neuquén in the period 1983-1987, he presided over the Justicialist bloc between 1986 and 1987. He was head of the Justicialist party of the province of Neuquén between 1988 and 1993 and in 1989 he was elected National Deputy for the same province. He was a candidate for the governorship of his province in 1991 and obtained 30% of the votes, behind the elected governor Jorge Sobisch.
