= Dirección Nacional de Inteligencia Estratégica Militar =

Dirección Nacional de Inteligencia Estratégica Militar (National Directorate of Strategic Military Intelligence, DNIEM) is an Argentine intelligence agency part of the National Intelligence System, created by the 2001 Intelligence Reform Law 25.520. It is structurally dependent of the Ministry of Defense.

== Director ==
The current director is Carlos Aníbal Aguilar, by decree D 1624/2005.

== Function ==
Its main mission is to produce strategic military intelligence and analysis. The intelligence services of the Argentine Armed Forces (see this list) have the job of producing strategic operational and tactical intelligence for the planning and conduction of military operations as well as the national strategic intelligence plan.

== See also ==
- List of secretaries of intelligence of Argentina
- Argentine intelligence agencies
- National Intelligence System
- National Intelligence School
- Directorate of Judicial Surveillance
- National Directorate of Criminal Intelligence
- Secretariat of Intelligence
