= Sistema de Inteligencia Nacional =

Sistema de Inteligencia Nacional (National Intelligence System, SIN) is the official denomination of the Argentine national intelligence community.

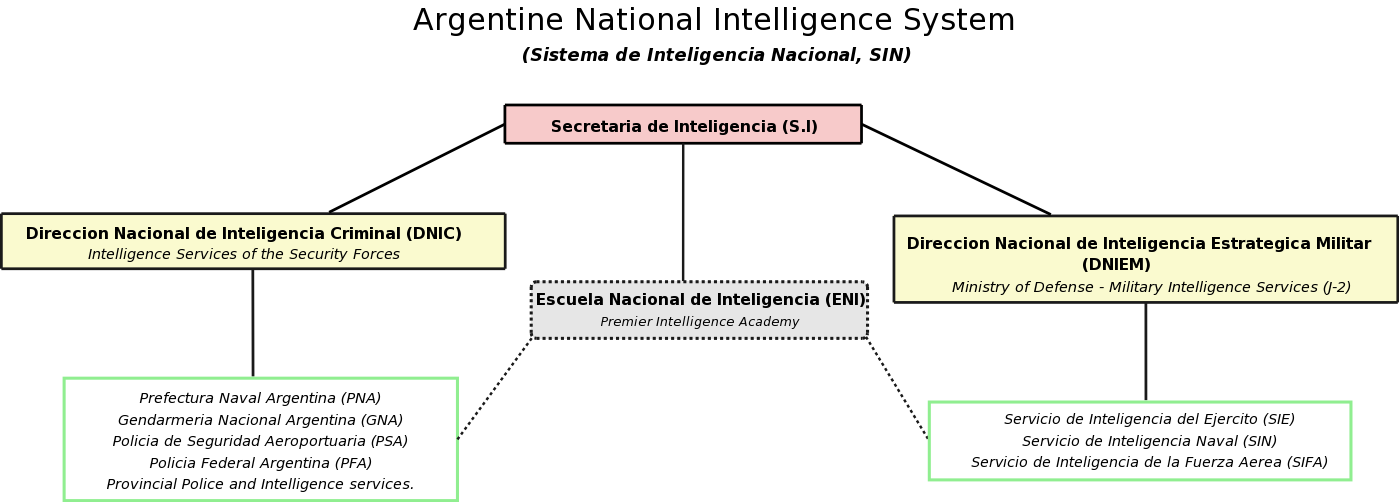
Diagram depicting the overall structure of the system

The National Intelligence System consists of the following agencies and its dependencies:

- Secretaría de Inteligencia (Secretariat of Intelligence, S.I)
  - Escuela Nacional de Inteligencia (National Intelligence School, ENI)
  - Dirección de Observaciones Judiciales (Directorate of Judicial Surveillance, DOJ)
- Dirección Nacional de Inteligencia Criminal (National Directorate of Criminal Intelligence, DNIC)
- Dirección Nacional de Inteligencia Estratégica Militar (National Directorate of Strategic Military Intelligence, DNIEM)

The National Intelligence System came online with the 2001 Intelligence Reform Law 25.520.

== See also ==
- List of secretaries of intelligence of Argentina
- Argentine intelligence agencies
- Secretariat of Intelligence
- National Intelligence School
- Directorate of Judicial Surveillance
- National Directorate of Criminal Intelligence
- National Directorate of Strategic Military Intelligence
