= 2003 in Argentina =

- Decades: 1980s; 1990s; 2000s; 2010s; 2020s
- See also: Other events of 2003; List of years in Argentina

Events in the year 2003 in Argentina.

== Incumbents ==
- President:
  - Eduardo Duhalde (until 25 May)
  - Néstor Kirchner (from 25 May)
- Vice President:
  - Vacant (until 25 May)
  - Daniel Scioli (from 25 May)

=== Governors ===
- Governor of Buenos Aires Province: Felipe Solá
- Governor of Catamarca Province:
  - Oscar Castillo (until 10 December)
  - Eduardo Brizuela del Moral (from 10 December)
- Governor of Chaco Province:
  - Ángel Rozas (until 10 December)
  - Roy Nikisch (starting 10 December)
- Governor of Chubut Province:
  - José Luis Lizurume (until 10 December)
  - Mario Das Neves (from 10 December)
- Governor of Córdoba: José Manuel De la Sota
- Governor of Corrientes Province: Ricardo Colombi
- Governor of Entre Ríos Province:
  - Sergio Montiel (until 11 December)
  - Jorge Busti (starting 11 December)
- Governor of Formosa Province: Gildo Insfrán
- Governor of Jujuy Province: Eduardo Fellner
- Governor of La Pampa Province:
  - Rubén Marín (until 11 December)
  - Carlos Verna (starting 11 December)
- Governor of La Rioja Province: Ángel Maza
- Governor of Mendoza Province:
  - Roberto Iglesias (until 11 December)
  - Julio Cobos (starting 11 December)
- Governor of Misiones Province: Carlos Rovira
- Governor of Neuquén Province: Jorge Sobisch
- Governor of Río Negro Province:
  - Pablo Verani (until 11 December)
  - Miguel Saiz (from 11 December)
- Governor of Salta Province: Juan Carlos Romero
- Governor of San Juan Province:
  - Wbaldino Acosta (until 11 December)
  - José Luis Gioja (from 11 December)
- Governor of San Luis Province:
  - María Alicia Lemme (until 10 December)
  - Alberto Rodríguez Saá (starting 11 December)
- Governor of Santa Cruz Province:
  - Néstor Kirchner (until 24 May)
  - Héctor Icazuriaga (24 May-10 December)
  - Sergio Acevedo (from 10 December)
- Governor of Santa Fe Province:
  - Carlos Reutemann (until 11 December)
  - Jorge Obeid (starting 11 December)
- Governor of Santiago del Estero: Mercedes Aragonés
- Governor of Tierra del Fuego: Carlos Manfredotti
- Governor of Tucumán:
  - Julio Miranda (until 29 October)
  - José Alperovich (starting 29 October)

=== Vice Governors ===
- Vice Governor of Buenos Aires Province: vacant (until 10 December); Graciela Giannettasio (starting 10 December)
- Vice Governor of Catamarca Province: Hernán Colombo
- Vice Governor of Chaco Province: Roy Nikisch (until 10 December) Eduardo Aníbal Moro (starting 10 December)
- Vice Governor of Corrientes Province: Eduardo Leonel Galantini
- Vice Governor of Entre Rios Province: Edelmiro Tomás Pauletti (until 10 December); Pedro Guastavino (starting 10 December)
- Vice Governor of Formosa Province: Floro Bogado
- Vice Governor of Jujuy Province: Rubén Daza (until 10 December); Walter Barrionuevo (starting 10 December)
- Vice Governor of La Pampa Province: Heriberto Mediza (until 10 December); Norma Durango (starting 10 December)
- Vice Governor of La Rioja Province: Luis Beder Herrera
- Vice Governor of Misiones Province: Mercedes Margarita Oviedo (until 10 December); Pablo Tschirsch (starting 10 December)
- Vice Governor of Nenquen Province: Jorge Sapag (until 10 December); Federico Brollo (starting 10 December)
- Vice Governor of Rio Negro Province: Bautista Mendioroz (until 10 December); Mario de Rege (starting 10 December)
- Vice Governor of Salta Province: Walter Wayar
- Vice Governor of San Juan Province: Marcelo Lima
- Vice Governor of San Luis Province: Blanca Pereyra
- Vice Governor of Santa Cruz: vacant (until 10 December); Carlos Sancho (starting 10 December)
- Vice Governor of Santa Fe Province: Marcelo Muniagurria (until 10 December); María Eugenia Bielsa (starting 10 December)
- Vice Governor of Santiago del Estero: vacant
- Vice Governor of Tierra del Fuego: Daniel Gallo

== Events ==
=== January ===
- 3 January: The Assembly of the Justicialist Party, with three presidential candidates, proposes using the Ley de Lemas in the main election instead of selecting one candidate in primaries. The opposition is outraged.

=== February ===
- 15 February: Worldwide protests against the imminent U.S. attack on Iraq. In Argentina, thousands demonstrate in Buenos Aires, Rosario, Santa Fe, Jujuy, Ushuaia and many other cities.
- 27 February: Archbishop of Santa Fe, Edgardo Gabriel Storni, is accused of sexual abuse on a seminarist, and absolved from two previous similar accusations.

=== April ===
- 27 April: Presidential elections, including three Justicialist candidates running separately. Carlos Menem beats Néstor Kirchner in the first voting round. Runoff election is scheduled for 18 May.
- 29 April: Heavy rainfall floods 7 departments of Santa Fe Province, including much of the capital. The Salado River, Argentina overflows. 100,000 people have to be evacuated.

=== May ===
- 14 May: Carlos Menem abandons his presidential aspirations in light of surveys showing an overwhelming defeat in the runoff election.
- 20 May: The Rosario-Victoria Bridge is finished and open for public access, joining two provinces over the Paraná River.
- 25 May: Néstor Kirchner assumes the presidency. Several Latin American presidents, including Fidel Castro, attend the inauguration.
- 27 May: President Kirchner retires 16 Army generals, starting a renewal of the Armed Forces. He also visits Entre Ríos and personally settles a 2-month-long teacher strike.
- 30 May: The government announces that road and highway concession contracts will not be renewed, and that fees and contracts of all privatized services will be revised.

=== June ===
- June 4: In a national speech on TV, President Kirchner denounces pressure from the Supreme Court (with a majority of Justices appointed by former President Menem), refuses to "negotiate behind society's back" and asks Congress to consider impeachment of the offending Justices.
- June 5: The SIDE's files on the AMIA bombing are to be declassified.
- 16 June: A group of neighbors of the town of Arequito, Santa Fe assault a police station, enraged by a murder. Police and a judge are accused of disregarding that and other cases.
- 19 June: The retired's welfare administration, PAMI, is placed under temporal state surveillance to investigate corruption.
  - People attack a police station in Arrecifes, Buenos Aires, for the same reasons as in Arequito three days ago.

=== August ===
- 6 August: A blackout leaves 400,000 people without electricity in the metropolitan area of Buenos Aires, one after government representatives deny a petition to raise power fees. President Kirchner voices suspicion.
- 11 August: Argentina adheres to the Convention on the imprescriptibility of war crimes and crimes against humanity. At the same time, Congress discusses repealing the laws that ended trials of military involved in the Proceso, and Criminal Chamber of the judiciary supports the involvement of Spanish judge Baltasar Garzón, who has asked for the arrest of 46 Argentinians.
- 12 August: The Chamber of Deputies repeals the "Law of Obedience Due" and the "Full Stop Law".
- 13 August: The Senate accuses Supreme Justice Eduardo Moliné O'Connor, who will be subject to "political trial" (impeachment).
- 14 August: A judge orders the arrest of Roberto Cirilo Perdía, Fernando Hugo Vaca Narvaja and Mario Eduardo Firmenich, former members of the far-leftist organization Montoneros, accused of leading their followers into a trap in 1979.
- 17 August: The National Women's Meeting demonstrates in Rosario, asking for free access to contraceptives and the right to abortion, and against the involvement of the Catholic Church in the issue.
- 23 August: Iran cuts commercial ties with Argentina over the arrest in Britain of its former ambassador, Hadi Soleimanpour, for alleged involvement in the 1994 AMIA bombing.
- 24 August: Citizens of the Autonomous City of Buenos Aires vote to elect a mayor. In the first round, Mauricio Macri gets about 4% more votes than Aníbal Ibarra, not enough to avoid a runoff.
- 26 August: The retired people's administrative entity, PAMI, for the first time acknowledges the pension rights of a homosexual man in cohabitation with another.

=== October ===
- 10 October: Sports - Rugby union: The 2003 Rugby World Cup, with 20 countries competing for the William Webb Ellis Trophy over a 7-week period, starts after a spectacular opening ceremony at the Telstra Stadium, Sydney, Australia with Australia defeating Argentina 24–8 in the opening match.

=== December ===
- 20 December: Former Argentinian president Carlos Menem is charged with tax fraud for failing to declare a Swiss bank account containing $600,000. If convicted he could be debarred from public office.

=== Full date unknown ===
- Apocalypse 13 drama film is released.

== Deaths ==
- 12 January: De facto President Leopoldo Galtieri (b. 1926)
- 26 May: Labour unionist, human rights activist and politician Alfredo Bravo (b. 1925)
- 10 June: Techint's leader, businessman Roberto Rocca (b. 1922)
- 5 July: Bebu Silvetti, popular musician, songwriter and arranger.
