= 2007 in Argentina =

- Decades: 1980s; 1990s; 2000s; 2010s; 2020s
- See also: Other events of 2007; List of years in Argentina

Events in the year 2007 in Argentina.

== Incumbents ==
- President:
  - Néstor Kirchner (until 10 December)
  - Cristina Fernández de Kirchner (starting 10 December)
- Vice President:
  - Daniel Scioli (until 10 December)
  - Julio Cobos (starting 10 December)

=== Governors ===
- Governor of Buenos Aires Province:
  - Felipe Solá (until 10 December)
  - Daniel Scioli (from 10 December)
- Governor of Catamarca Province: Eduardo Brizuela del Moral
- Governor of Chaco Province:
  - Roy Nikisch (until 10 December)
  - Jorge Capitanich (from 10 December)
- Governor of Chubut Province: Mario Das Neves
- Governor of Córdoba: José Manuel De la Sota (until 10 December); Juan Schiaretti (starting 10 December)
- Governor of Corrientes Province: Arturo Colombi
- Governor of Entre Ríos Province: Jorge Busti (until 10 December); Sergio Urribarri (starting 10 December)
- Governor of Formosa Province: Gildo Insfrán
- Governor of Jujuy Province: Eduardo Fellner (until 10 December); Walter Barrionuevo (starting 10 December)
- Governor of La Pampa Province: Carlos Verna (until 10 December); Oscar Jorge (starting 10 December)
- Governor of La Rioja Province: Ángel Maza (until 12 April); Luis Beder Herrera (starting 12 April)
- Governor of Mendoza Province:
  - Julio Cobos (until 10 December)
  - Celso Jaque (starting 10 December)
- Governor of Misiones Province: Carlos Rovira (until 10 December); Maurice Closs (starting 10 December)
- Governor of Neuquén Province: Jorge Sobisch (until 10 December); Jorge Sapag (starting 10 December)
- Governor of Río Negro Province: Miguel Saiz
- Governor of Salta Province: Juan Carlos Romero (until 10 December); Juan Manuel Urtubey (starting 10 December)
- Governor of San Juan Province: José Luis Gioja
- Governor of San Luis Province: Alberto Rodríguez Saá
- Governor of Santa Cruz Province:
  - Carlos Sancho (until 10 May)
  - Daniel Peralta (starting 11 May)
- Governor of Santa Fe Province: Jorge Obeid (until 11 December); Hermes Binner (starting 11 December)
- Governor of Santiago del Estero: Gerardo Zamora
- Governor of Tierra del Fuego:
  - Jorge Colazo (until 17 December)
  - Fabiana Ríos (from 17 December)
- Governor of Tucumán: José Alperovich

=== Vice Governors ===
- Vice Governor of Buenos Aires Province:
  - Graciela Giannettasio (until 10 December)
  - Alberto Balestrini (starting 10 December)
- Vice Governor of Catamarca Province: Marta Grimaux
- Vice Governor of Chaco Province:
  - Eduardo Aníbal Moro (until 10 December)
  - Juan Carlos Bacileff Ivanoff (starting 10 December)
- Vice Governor of Corrientes Province: Tomás Rubén Pruyas
- Vice Governor of Entre Rios Province:
  - Pedro Guastavino (until 10 December)
  - José Lauritto (starting 10 December)
- Vice Governor of Formosa Province: Floro Bogado
- Vice Governor of Jujuy Province:
  - Walter Barrionuevo (until 10 December)
  - Pedro Segura (starting 10 December)
- Vice Governor of La Pampa Province:
  - Norma Durango (until 10 December)
  - Luis Alberto Campo (starting 10 December)
- Vice Governor of La Rioja Province:
  - Luis Beder Herrera (until 10 December)
  - Vacant (starting 10 December)
- Vice Governor of Misiones Province:
  - Pablo Tschirsch (until 10 December)
  - Sandra Giménez (starting 10 December)
- Governor of Neuquén Province:
  - Federico Brollo (until 10 December)
  - Ana Pechen (starting 10 December)
- Vice Governor of Rio Negro Province:
  - Mario de Rege (until 10 December)
  - Bautista Mendioroz (starting 10 December)
- Vice Governor of Salta Province:
  - Walter Wayar (until 10 December)
  - Andrés Zottos (starting 10 December)
- Vice Governor of San Juan Province:
  - Marcelo Lima (until 10 December)
  - Rubén Uñac (starting 10 December)
- Vice Governor of San Luis Province:
  - Blanca Pereyra (until 10 December)
  - Jorge Luis Pellegrini (starting 10 December)
- Vice Governor of Santa Cruz:
  - Vacant (until 10 December)
  - Luis Martínez Crespo (starting 10 December)
- Vice Governor of Santa Fe Province:
  - María Eugenia Bielsa (until 10 December)
  - Griselda Tessio (starting 10 December)
- Vice Governor of Santiago del Estero: Blanca Porcel
- Vice Governor of Tierra del Fuego:
  - Vacant (until 10 December)
  - Carlos Basanetti (starting 10 December)

== Events ==
=== January ===
- 12 January: Former president Isabel Perón is arrested in Madrid, Spain, following a warrant issued by an Argentine judge investigating the forced disappearance of a student activist in 1976. Another warrant follows soon, as well as a request for her extradition to Argentina.
- 26 January: The wine-producing area of San Rafael, Mendoza is hit by a hailstorm, which ruins the grape harvest in the region and causes AR$50 million in damages.

=== March ===
- 1 March: India requests the extradition of Italian businessman Ottavio Quattrocchi from Argentina in relation to the Bofors scandal.
- 13 March: In La Rioja, governor Ángel Maza, after being impeached by a legislature that answers to vice governor Luis Beder Herrera, locks himself up in the government house, while violent protests take place outside, until the police force Maza's supporters to leave. The national government briefly considers federal intervention.
- 26 March: A massive storm system brings heavy rain to the center and south of Santa Fe. The rain falls almost continuously for more than one week. Large sections of Santa Fe City and peripheral neighbourhoods of Rosario, as well as many smaller towns and large sections of Argentina's most productive agricultural land, are flooded. The storm moves east, affecting the south of Entre Ríos and eventually reaching Uruguay. See March 2007 floods in the Argentine littoral.

=== April ===
- 9 April: Tens of thousands of demonstrators in Buenos Aires and other cities across Argentina protest the death of Carlos Fuentealba, a schoolteacher who was fatally injured by a tear gas canister fired by police during a protest the previous week over pay and working conditions.
- 10 April: Argentina's only icebreaker, ARA Almirante Irízar, catches fire while returning from her summer Antarctic campaign, 140 miles off Puerto Madryn. The ship is then towed to Puerto Belgrano, arriving on 20 April.
- 11 April: Among accusations of government tampering with economic statistics, the National Institute of Statistics and Census (INDEC) modifies previous inflation figures and announces that the basic food basket experienced 0.2% deflation in March.
- 11 April: Football: The semi-finals of Copa del Rey begin in Nou Camp. Argentine Lionel Messi scored a spectacular goal against Getafe CF.That goal is very similar to a Diego Maradona's goal against England in Mexico World Cup 1986.Both of them passed six defenders including goalkeeper and scored.
- 25 April: An Argentine federal court overturns the pardons issued to General Jorge Videla and former Admiral Emilio Massera following convictions received for their activities during the "Dirty War" of the 1970s. The repeal of the pardons is largely symbolic, since the two are already under house arrest and serving lengthy sentences for other crimes.

=== May ===
- 10 May: Santa Cruz Province governor Carlos Sancho resigns, after weeks of strikes and demonstrations by the teachers' union followed by violent police repression. Provincial deputy Daniel Peralta is chosen to replace him.

=== June ===
- 24 June: Mauricio Macri of Republican Proposal defeats Daniel Filmus of the government's Front for Victory in the ballotage of the Buenos Aires City's Chief of Government elections

=== July ===
- 9 July: On the country's Independence Day, snow falls in Buenos Aires, Argentina, for the first time in 89 years and the second time in recorded history. Two people die of exposure in Argentina while one person dies in Chile.
- 15 July: Brazil defeats Argentina 3–0 in the 2007 Copa América final.
- 16 July: Felisa Miceli, the Argentine Economy Minister, resigns over approximately US$60,000 found in a bag in her office.
- 20 July: 2007 FIFA U-20 World Cup: After the Argentina vs Chile semi-final game ended, a scuffle between Toronto Police officers and members of the Chilean team led to the arrest of 21 players
- 22 July: 2007 FIFA U-20 World Cup Final: Argentina defeated the Czech Republic 2–1 to win its sixth World Cup title.

=== August ===
- 7 August: Argentina signs an "energy security treaty" with Venezuela in Buenos Aires.
- 10 August: The President of Venezuela Hugo Chávez meets with the President of Bolivia Evo Morales and the President of Argentina Néstor Kirchner in Tarija, Bolivia.
- 13 August: A scandal erupts in Argentina when a Venezuelan businessman is caught trying to smuggle US$800,000 into the country on a plane belonging to Enarsa, Argentina's government-owned energy company.
- 14 August: Cristina Fernández de Kirchner, current First Lady of Argentina and candidate to become President of Argentina, announces Julio Cobos, the Governor of Mendoza Province as her running mate.
- 15 August: Cristina Fernández de Kirchner, Argentine presidential candidate, presents Julio Cobos as her running mate.

=== September ===
- 2 September: The United States men's national basketball team defeats Argentina 118–81 to win the 2007 FIBA Americas Championship, with both teams qualifying for the 2008 Summer Olympics.
- 8 September: Former President of Argentina Carlos Menem is charged with involvement in the illegal sale of weapons to Ecuador and Croatia.

=== October ===
- 9 October: Christian Von Wernich, a Roman Catholic priest and former police chaplain is sentenced to a life sentence for his role in torture, kidnapping and murder during Argentina's dirty war.
- 19 October: Rugby: Argentina's national rugby union team win the IRB World Cup Bronze final. Los Pumas defeated France, 34–10 in Parc des Princes.
- 23 October: An Argentine court initiates legal proceedings against former president Fernando de la Rúa for failing to prevent the deaths of five protestors during the December 2001 riots at the peak of the 1999–2002 economic crisis.
- 28 October: Cristina Fernández de Kirchner of the Front for Victory, wife of incumbent president Néstor Kirchner, resoundingly wins presidential elections in the first round and becomes the first female president elected in Argentina. The second-placed candidate s another women, Elisa Carrió of the Civic Coalition.

=== November ===
- 12 November: Ceferino Namuncurá is the first indigenous Argentine to be beatified by the Roman Catholic Church. 100,000 people attend the ceremony in Chimpay.
- 22 November: Argentine defense minister Nilda Garré sacks the head of military intelligence, Brigadier General Osvaldo Montero, for plotting to replace her.

== Deaths ==
- 11 February: Jorge Antonio, 89, Peronist party politician and business man.
- 16 February: Herminio Iglesias, 77, Peronist Party politician.
- 9 March: Juan Carlos Portantiero, 73, sociologist, renal failure.
- 13 May: Luis María Mendía, 82, naval commander.
- 20 May: TV journalist Mario Mazzone.
- 13 June: Néstor Rossi, 82, footballer, played in 1958 FIFA World Cup.
- 15 June: former world middleweight champion boxer Hugo Corro.
- 19 July: cartoonist and writer Roberto Fontanarrosa.
- 20 July: Golde Flami, 89, actress.
- 13 August: Roberto Maidana, 79, journalist, pneumonia.
- 3 September: Gustavo Eberto, 24, football goalkeeper for Boca Juniors, testicular cancer.
- 2 November: Jean Pierre Reguerraz, 68, actor.
- 13 December: journalist Victor Sueiro.
- 26 December: Raúl Bernao, 66, footballer, hepatitis.
- Date unknown
  - Fernando Sabsay, historian and teacher.

== Sports ==
See worldwide 2007 in sports

- 20 January: The first Argentine major rivalry of the year was played between River Plate and Boca Juniors in Mar del Plata. The match ended in a 2–0 score in favor of River Plate.

== See also ==
- List of Argentine films of 2007
