= 2004 in Argentina =

- Decades: 1980s; 1990s; 2000s; 2010s; 2020s
- See also: Other events of 2004; List of years in Argentina

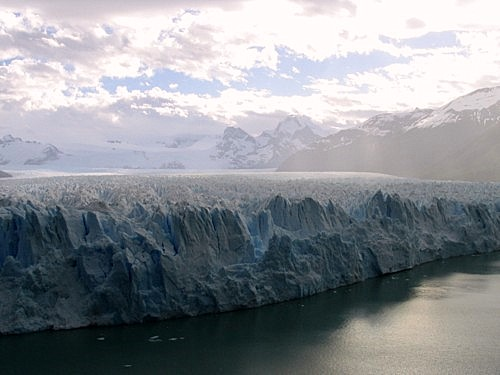
Argentina

Events in the year 2004 in Argentina.

== Incumbents ==
- President: Néstor Kirchner
- Vice President: Daniel Scioli

=== Governors ===
- Governor of Buenos Aires Province: Felipe Solá
- Governor of Catamarca Province: Eduardo Brizuela del Moral
- Governor of Chaco Province: Roy Nikisch
- Governor of Chubut Province: Mario Das Neves
- Governor of Córdoba: José Manuel De la Sota
- Governor of Corrientes Province: Ricardo Colombi
- Governor of Entre Ríos Province: Jorge Busti
- Governor of Formosa Province: Gildo Insfrán
- Governor of Jujuy Province: Eduardo Fellner
- Governor of La Pampa Province: Carlos Verna
- Governor of La Rioja Province: Ángel Maza
- Governor of Mendoza Province: Julio Cobos
- Governor of Misiones Province: Carlos Rovira
- Governor of Neuquén Province: Jorge Sobisch
- Governor of Río Negro Province: Miguel Saiz
- Governor of Salta Province: Juan Carlos Romero
- Governor of San Juan Province: José Luis Gioja
- Governor of San Luis Province: Alberto Rodríguez Saá
- Governor of Santa Cruz Province: Sergio Acevedo
- Governor of Santa Fe Province: Jorge Obeid
- Governor of Santiago del Estero:
  - Mercedes Aragonés (until 1 April)
  - Pablo Lanusse (from 1 April)
- Governor of Tierra del Fuego:
  - Carlos Manfredotti (until 10 January)
  - Jorge Colazo (from 10 January)
- Governor of Tucumán: José Alperovich

=== Vice Governors ===
- Vice Governor of Buenos Aires Province: Graciela Giannettasio
- Vice Governor of Catamarca Province: Hernán Colombo
- Vice Governor of Chaco Province: Eduardo Aníbal Moro
- Vice Governor of Corrientes Province: Eduardo Leonel Galantini
- Vice Governor of Entre Rios Province: Pedro Guastavino
- Vice Governor of Formosa Province: Floro Bogado
- Vice Governor of Jujuy Province: Walter Barrionuevo
- Vice Governor of La Pampa Province: Norma Durango
- Vice Governor of La Rioja Province: Luis Beder Herrera
- Vice Governor of Misiones Province: Pablo Tschirsch
- Vice Governor of Nenquen Province: Federico Brollo
- Vice Governor of Rio Negro Province: Mario de Rege
- Vice Governor of Salta Province: Walter Wayar
- Vice Governor of San Juan Province: Marcelo Lima
- Vice Governor of San Luis Province: Blanca Pereyra
- Vice Governor of Santa Cruz: Carlos Sancho
- Vice Governor of Santa Fe Province: María Eugenia Bielsa
- Vice Governor of Santiago del Estero: Vacant
- Vice Governor of Tierra del Fuego: Vacant

== Events ==
=== January ===
- 7 January: Roger Noriega, U.S. Sub-Secretary for the Western Hemisphere, criticizes Argentina's position on Cuba, and Minister of Foreign Affairs Rafael Bielsa says he feels affected and offended, starting a minor diplomatic crisis.
- 22 January: A piece of space debris, apparently a part of a U.S. GPS satellite, falls in a field in San Roque, Corrientes.
- 27 January: The Argentine state regains the control of the radioelectric spectrum after withdrawing the concession of exploitation granted to the French company Thales Spectrum.
- 30 January: A demonstration in Santa Fe, asking for government assistance to those affected by the 2003 flood, ends with the burning of the government house's facade and several offices destroyed.

=== February ===
- 3 February: The government learns that Dirty War criminal Guillermo Suárez Mason violated his house arrest with the help of the Ambassador of Ecuador, who is recalled the next day.
- 16 February: The governor of Santiago del Estero, Mercedes Aragonés de Juárez, is charged with fiscal fraud and planning an attack on a political opponent.
- 19 February: Nationwide protest day of the piquetero movement. 50,000 people take part in road blocks and demonstrations all over the country, without violent incidents.
- 23 February: Antonio Musa Azar, ex-Secretary of Intelligence of Carlos Juárez, former governor of Santiago del Estero, accuses him of the forced disappearance of a Peronist deputy during the Dirty War. Juárez's wife, governor Mercedes Aragonés, is also charged with planning the assassination of a former governor.

=== March ===
- 3 March: Journalist and TV presenter Juan Castro throws himself from his apartment in Palermo, Buenos Aires, attempting suicide. He dies three days later.
- 14 March: The ice wall of the Perito Moreno Glacier in Patagonia breaks and crumbles for the first time in 16 years, before 9,000 spectators.
- 19 March: Judge Rodolfo Canicoba Corral declares unconstitutional the pardon granted by President Carlos Menem to the military leaders of the Dirty War in 1989–1990.
- 24 March: As part of the commemoration of the coup d'état that started the Proceso in 1976, the Navy Mechanics School, a former concentration camp, becomes a museum. The head of the Army takes out the official portraits of de facto presidents Jorge Rafael Videla and Reynaldo Bignone.
  - The corpse of 23-year-old kidnapping victim Axel Blumberg appears in a dumpster in Moreno, province of Buenos Aires, with a bullet shot through his temple.

=== April ===
- 1 April: More than 100,000 people demonstrate in Buenos Aires in support of Juan Carlos Blumberg, father of the murdered Axel Blumberg, demanding harsher criminal laws.
- 2 April: The National Congress dictates the federal intervention of Santiago del Estero. The governor Mercedes Aragonés joins her husband Carlos Juárez in prison, breaking the 50-year-long quasi-feudal dominance of the Juárez family in the province.
  - The Buenos Aires Police is found suspect of creating a "liberated zone" for the kidnappers of Axel Blumberg.
- 7 April: Congress hastily discusses and passes new criminal laws. Many see this as a demagogical, opportunistic reaction to Blumberg's demands.
- 13 April: María Julia Alsogaray, former official of the Menem administration, faces trial on charges of corruption.
- 20 April: Avi Lewis and Naomi Klein visit Argentina and present their documentary film The Take at the worker-run Brukman factory.
- 22 April: Tens of thousands demonstrate with Juan Carlos Blumberg, for the second time. The predominantly middle-class gathering is joined by columns of piqueteros.
  - A secretary of former Menemist Minister of Justice Raúl Granillo Ocampo reveals that all the ministers were paid $50,000 monthly in "extra" wages.
- 27 April: Judge Norberto Oyarbide, like judge Jorge Urso before, requests the extradition of ex-President Carlos Menem from Chile. Menem had rejected a previous summons three times on health reasons, but was seen performing a typical ethnic dance with an "odalisque" in Chile.
- 29 April: On the first anniversary of the flood of Santa Fe, 10,000 demonstrate in front of the government house, asking for punishment of the responsible officials.

=== May ===
- 3 May: The government raises state workers salaries and pension wages, as tax collection improves.
- 5 May: Diego Maradona has to be admitted to a hospital 5 days after his last leave because of a food and drink binge.
- 7 May: The national government retires 107 top posts of the Federal Police (adding up to 582 since July 2003).
- 10 May: A judge denies legal status to a neo-Nazi political party (Partido Nuevo Triunfo), led by self-styled Führer Alejandro Biondini.
- 11 May: The government announces a programme to deal with the energy crisis, after agreements with Petrobras and Repsol-YPF, with heavy investments in the Yaciretá dam (hydroelectricity), the Atucha II Nuclear Power Plant, and the creation of Enarsa, a state-owned oil company. Natural gas, crude oil and gasoline export taxes are raised to preserve internal supply.
- 15 May: The provincial government fires 303 Buenos Aires Police officers, accused of multiple crimes including "happy triggers", torture and sexual abuse on detainees.
- 21 May: María Julia Alsogaray is sentenced to 3 years and forced to return ill-gotten $700,000.
- 30 May: Several Esso employees, customs officers and boat captains (13 people) are accused of crude oil contraband.

=== June ===
- 1 June: Minister of Economy Roberto Lavagna offers Argentine bond holders to exchange the debt with a steep discount (around 60% nominal).
- 8 June: 70-year-old Catholic priest José Mariani releases an autobiographical book about celibacy and sexual experiences of his and other members of the Church, which erupts public controversy.
- 11 June: The government regains control of the national post service, formerly in private hands.
- 12 June: President Kirchner launches his wife Cristina Fernández as Buenos Aires candidate for the Senate.
- 16 June. Congress approves the deployment of Argentine peacekeeping troops in Haiti.
- 18 June: Piqueteros and left-wing parties demonstrate in several large cities. Followers of Raúl Castells occupy McDonald's restaurants demanding food.
- 29 June: President Kirchner visits China looking to foster commerce.
  - Minister of Foreign Relations Rafael Bielsa says "We are fed up with [Roger] Noriega and his meddling in Argentine politics as if we were [the United States'] backyard". Noriega had criticized the lenient treatment of piqueteros by the Argentine government and the political fight between Kirchner and former president Duhalde.

=== July ===
- 6 July: The Senate OKs the appointment of Carmen Argibay, an avowed feminist and atheist, to the Supreme Court.
- 7 July: The 26th Summit of the Mercosur plus Chile, Venezuela and Mexico starts in Puerto Iguazú, Misiones.
- 14 July: The CGT unifies under three leaders, each belonging to a different labour union.
- 18 July: 10th anniversary of the AMIA bombing. New and formerly withheld clues point to the involvement of the SIDE, of ex-president Menem, a judge, and the Israeli ambassador.

=== August ===
- 9 August: The government raises retirement pensions to 308 pesos (about $100).
- 12 August: The Chamber of Deputies accuses Supreme Court Justice Adolfo Vázquez. He is to be subject to "political trial" by the Senate.
  - Senator Vilma Ibarra presents a legislative project to de-criminalize abortion in restricted contexts.
- 16 August: Venezuelan president Hugo Chávez invites Cristina Fernández de Kirchner to Caracas as a display of regional integration.
- 23 August: Dirty War criminal Emilio Eduardo Massera is forced to pay 200,000 pesos ($66,000) in reparations to a child of desaparecidos.
  - A blackout in Greater Buenos Aires leaves 600,000 without power for 40 minutes.
- 25 August: Piquetero leader Raúl Castells is arrested in Chaco for the forced occupation of the Casino Gala Resistencia.
- 26 August: Juan Carlos Blumberg leads a massive demonstration before Congress. He asks for harder punishments for crime and states that in Argentina "human rights are only for the criminals". Many criticize him, while the political right aligns behind him.
- 31 August: Demonstrators greet IMF head Rodrigo Rato, who is meeting Roberto Lavagna, with burning tires and Molotov cocktails in front of the Ministry of Economy.

=== September ===
- 1 September: Justice Adolfo Vázquez resigns, thus sparing himself the inquiry over his past performance and the loss of a 12,000-peso retirement pension ($4,000, about 40 times the minimum).
- 2 September: The Salary Council (made up by labour unions and corporative representatives) agrees to raise the minimum wage by 28.6% to 450 pesos ($150).
- 6 September: Abraham Kaul, head of the AMIA Jewish association bombed in 1994, claims that then-president Carlos Menem obstructed the investigation.
- 7 September: A 6.4 M_{w} earthquake hits Catamarca leaving at least one person dead. The shock had a maximum Mercalli intensity of VI (Strong) and was felt as far as Buenos Aires.
- 14 September: National soccer team coach Marcelo Bielsa resigns suddenly citing a "lack of energy for the task", at the peak of his career after the Argentine team had won gold in the Olympic Games.
- 23 September: Alfonso Prat Gay is replaced by Martín Redrado as the head of the Central Bank, after disagreements with the Ministry of Economy.
- 28 September: A 15-year-old student fires a 9-mm gun on his schoolmates, killing three and wounding five, in Carmen de Patagones, Buenos Aires Province.

=== October ===
- 1 October: Natural gas prices rise 7–8%. Argentina's has more LNG-powered vehicles than any other country and its industry also relies heavily on it.
  - Fito Páez and Luis Alberto Spinetta open the 9-day Quilmes Rock festival.
  - Daniel Burman's El abrazo partido is chosen to compete for the Foreign Language Oscar Award.
- 5 October: Jorge Zorreguieta, father of Princess Máxima of the Netherlands, is accused of involvement in the forced disappearance of state employee in 1976.
- 7 October: Private retirement funds who hold 17% of the defaulted Argentine debt bonds ($15,300 million) agree to exchange them.
- 10 October: The 10th Women's Meeting gathered in Mendoza ends with 20,000 demonstrators asking for safe contraception and the right to abortion. Minor violent incidents with Catholic groups.
- 12 October: Official celebrations of Columbus Day are opposed by counter-protests, marches and gatherings by aboriginal associations, popular assemblies and other NGOs.
- 15 October: The United Nations chooses Argentina, Denmark, Greece, Japan, and Tanzania as the non-permanent members of the UN Security Council for its next two-year term, which begins in January 2005.
- 20 October: The Senate OKs the creation of Enarsa, the future state-owned oil company.
- 26 October: The Supreme Court declares constitutional the 2002 "peso-ification" of bank deposits, by which dollar-denominated accounts were converted to pesos at an artificial rate of 1.4 pesos per dollar plus an inflation-adjusted index.

=== November ===
- 1 November: Minister Lavagna presents the Argentine debt exchange proposal, which includes a nominal discount worth 62%, to the U.S. Securities and Exchange Commission.
- 8 November: Luciano Benetton offers 25 of the 9,700 km^{2} he owns in Patagonia for the use of the Mapuche tribe, who claim the full restoration of their lands.
- 11 November: The government removes 12 of the 16 general commanders of the Gendarmerie for illegal administration of funds.
- 17 November: The Third International Congress of the Spanish Language starts in Rosario, with the presence of the King and Queen of Spain and renowned writers such as Ernesto Sábato, Carlos Fuentes and José Saramago.
- 17 November: Three apparently home-made explosive devices are detonated in three Buenos Aires banks in Argentina, killing a security guard and wounding a police officer.
- 18 November: Argentina recognizes China as a market economy, supporting its acceptance into the WTO; in exchange, China vows to increase imports from Argentina by $4,000 million along 5 years.
- 23 November: The government raises worker's social benefits and grants an extra, one-time rise to pension wages for December; informally called "Merry Christmas Plan", intended to stimulate consumption during the holiday season.
- 30 November: A survey reveals that over 70% of Argentinians believe abortion should be allowed in certain contexts, though only 24% support it in all cases.

=== December ===
- 1 December: Archbishop of Buenos Aires Jorge Bergoglio calls an art exhibition by León Ferrari "a shame" and "blasphemy". Many of Ferrari's works employ religious icons and characters.
- 3 December: Five people enter León Ferrari's exhibition and destroy 10 of his works crying "Live Christ King!".
- 6 December: Workers of the Buenos Aires metro go on strike for several days.
- 7 December: The master server for .com.ar Internet domains in Argentina gets a corrupt update of a DNS table, and local Internet traffic stops for almost eight hours throughout the country.
- 9 December: The government raises private workers' salaries 100 pesos ($33) by decree.
  - Floods affect 6,000 km^{2} in Chaco and 10,000 people have to be evacuated. Ecologists warn that the effects were magnified by deforestation.
- 10 December: Catholic fundamentalists disrupt a press conference by Rebecca Gomperts, president of pro-choice NGO Women on Waves.
- 14 December: An attempt to pass a sexual education law in Buenos Aires fails due to lack of consensus. Supporters request a referendum.
- 16 December: Congress initiates the accusation process against Supreme Justice Antonio Boggiano. At the same time Justice Ricardo Lorenzetti gets the approval of the Senate.
- 17 December: Judge Elena Liberatori shuts down León Ferrari's exhibition upon request of a Catholic association, on grounds that it invades the citizens' private life, even though it is shown inside a museum and behind multiple warnings.
- 19 December: Artists, politicians, human rights activists and others support León Ferrari by symbolically "embracing" the museum.
- 20 December: On the 3rd anniversary of the 2001 riots, the piquetero movement splits: opposition hard-liners and pro-government groups demonstrate at different places.
- 27 December: A judge panel revokes the shutdown of León Ferrari's exhibit.
- 28 December: Media businessman Marcelo Tinelli shifts his contract to Canal 9, leaving the Telefé network without its highest rating programmes overnight.
- 30 December: A fire in the República Cromagnon nightclub in Buenos Aires kills 194 people and injures over 1,400.

== Births ==
- 9 August – Leonel Pérez – Malaysian professional footballer

== Deaths ==
- 4 September: Jorge Enea Spilimbergo, politician.
- 23 November: Adolfo Castelo, journalist (b. 1940)
- 28 November: Lucas Molina, 20, football player, cardiac arrest.
