= 2005 in Argentina =

- Decades: 1980s; 1990s; 2000s; 2010s; 2020s
- See also: Other events of 2005; List of years in Argentina

Events during the year 2005 in Argentina.

== Incumbents ==
- President: Néstor Kirchner
- Vice President: Daniel Scioli

=== Governors ===
- Governor of Buenos Aires Province: Felipe Solá
- Governor of Catamarca Province: Eduardo Brizuela del Moral
- Governor of Chaco Province: Roy Nikisch
- Governor of Chubut Province: Mario Das Neves
- Governor of Córdoba: José Manuel de la Sota
- Governor of Corrientes Province:
  - Ricardo Colombi (until 10 December)
  - Arturo Colombi (from 10 December)
- Governor of Entre Ríos Province: Jorge Busti
- Governor of Formosa Province: Gildo Insfrán
- Governor of Jujuy Province: Eduardo Fellner
- Governor of La Pampa Province: Carlos Verna
- Governor of La Rioja Province: Ángel Maza
- Governor of Mendoza Province: Julio Cobos
- Governor of Misiones Province: Carlos Rovira
- Governor of Neuquén Province: Jorge Sobisch
- Governor of Río Negro Province: Miguel Saiz
- Governor of Salta Province: Juan Carlos Romero
- Governor of San Juan Province: José Luis Gioja
- Governor of San Luis Province: Alberto Rodríguez Saá
- Governor of Santa Cruz Province: Sergio Acevedo
- Governor of Santa Fe Province: Jorge Obeid
- Governor of Santiago del Estero:
  - Pablo Lanusse (until 23 March)
  - Gerardo Zamora (from 23 March)
- Governor of Tierra del Fuego: Jorge Colazo
- Governor of Tucumán: José Alperovich

=== Vice governors ===
- Vice Governor of Buenos Aires Province: Graciela Giannettasio
- Vice Governor of Catamarca Province: Hernán Colombo
- Vice Governor of Chaco Province: Eduardo Aníbal Moro
- Vice Governor of Corrientes Province:
  - Eduardo Leonel Galantini (until 10 December)
  - Tomás Rubén Pruyas (from 10 December)
- Vice Governor of Entre Rios Province: Pedro Guastavino
- Vice Governor of Formosa Province: Floro Bogado
- Vice Governor of Jujuy Province: Walter Barrionuevo
- Vice Governor of La Pampa Province: Norma Durango
- Vice Governor of La Rioja Province: Luis Beder Herrera
- Vice Governor of Misiones Province: Pablo Tschirsch
- Vice Governor of Nenquen Province: Federico Brollo
- Vice Governor of Rio Negro Province: Mario de Rege
- Vice Governor of Salta Province: Walter Wayar
- Vice Governor of San Juan Province: Marcelo Lima
- Vice Governor of San Luis Province: Blanca Pereyra
- Vice Governor of Santa Cruz: Carlos Sancho
- Vice Governor of Santa Fe Province: María Eugenia Bielsa
- Vice Governor of Santiago del Estero: Blanca Porcel
- Vice Governor of Tierra del Fuego: Vacant

== Events ==
=== January ===
- 11 January: The state fines power distribution companies and national water company on grounds of bad quality service, and reclaims unpaid fines and unfulfilled investment goals, for a total of more $50 million.
- 14 January: Ex-naval officer Adolfo Scilingo goes to trial in Spain accused of killing political prisoners during the Dirty War.
  - AFJPs (private retirement fund administrators) and other major local investors accept the terms of the debt restructuring proposed by the state, exchanging all their public debt bonds (worth $15,000 million).

=== February ===
- 3 February: Avowed feminist and militant atheist Carmen Argibay is sworn into the Supreme Court.
- 11 February: At least eight people are killed during a jail riot in Córdoba. All hostages taken by the prisoners were later freed by police.
- 18 February: Catholic military chaplain Antonio Baseotto replies in harsh terms to statements by Minister of Health Ginés González García on abortion, starting a series of conflicts between the Church and the Argentine State.

=== March ===
- 7 March: In Spain, prosecutors of the case of Adolfo Scilingo request a prison sentence of 9,138 years.
- 10 March: Paul Schäfer, former leader of Colonia Dignidad community in Chile, is arrested accused of child sexual abuse. He had been on the run for 8 years.

=== April ===
- 1 April: The government of Argentina delays its debt restructuring—exchanging old bonds for new—due to a decision by a U.S. federal court judge, who froze the processing of old bonds held by the Bank of New York, pending a hearing before the appeals court.
- 19 April: A high court in Spain sentences Adolfo Scilingo, former Argentinian navy captain, for 640 years in prison for crimes against humanity during the Dirty War.
- 30 April: About 40,000 Argentinians and Uruguayans block the international Puerto Unzué-Fray Bentos bridge, protesting the planned building of two papermills on the Uruguayan side of the Uruguay River, citing environmental concerns.

=== June ===
- 14 June: The Supreme Court declares two laws that granted immunity to Dirty War human rights abusers unconstitutional.
- 15 June: The Serbian special war crimes tribunal asks the government to ask Argentina for extradition of Nebojša Minić, suspected of crimes against humanity in Kosovo in 1999

=== July ===
- 1 July: The People's Children National Movement, claiming an end to child hunger, close their 20,000-people march from Tucumán with a demonstration in Plaza de Mayo, Buenos Aires.

=== October ===
- 23 October: Legislative elections. Candidates sponsored by President Néstor Kirchner win in most districts including the key Buenos Aires Province, but lose in Buenos Aires City and Santa Fe Province.

=== November ===
- 4 November: Over 10,000 protest against US President George W. Bush at the Fourth Summit of the Americas in Mar del Plata.
- 14 November: Buenos Aires mayor Aníbal Ibarra is impeached on accusations of negligence regarding the República Cromagnon nightclub fire of 2004.
- 24 November: Technicians and pilots of Aerolíneas Argentinas began a strike demanding pay rises. The strike lasts 9 days, strands 82,000 passengers and causes $10 million losses to the company.

=== December ===
- 6 December: The Fourth Summit of the Americas ends. Argentina, Brazil and Venezuela align against the U.S.-backed FTAA.
- 15 December: President Kirchner announces the anticipated cancellation of the public debt to the International Monetary Fund, for $9,810 million, in a single payment, with funds drawn from the foreign currency reserves of the Central Bank.
- 20 December: Piqueteros, leftist parties, labour unions, student groups and other NGOs march in Buenos Aires on the 4th anniversary of activists' deaths during the 2001 riots, asking for welfare subsidies, and denouncing the payment of the debt to the IMF.
- 21 December: Three government officers of the de la Rúa administration and six former senators are accused of participation in a scandal involving bribes to pass a labour law reform in 2000.
  - Former governor of Corrientes Raúl Romero Feris is sentenced to five years in prison for misappropriation of state funds.
- 30 December: Environmental groups and other concerned citizens, supported by Entre Ríos governor Jorge Busti, block the three bridges that join the province with Uruguay, protesting the construction of two paper and wood pulp factories in Fray Bentos.

== Deaths ==
- 28 January – Daniel Branca (b. 1951), comic artist.
- 17 February – Omar Sívori, 69, footballer.
- 24 February – Norberto Napolitano, Pappo (b. 1950), blues and rock musician.
- 13 April – Juan Zanotto, 69, comic book artist.
- 11 June – Juan José Saer (b. 1937), novelist.
- 18 June – Manuel Sadosky, 91, father of Computer Science studies and former Secretary of State of Science and Technology (1983–1989).
- 1 July – Guillermo Patricio Kelly (b. 1922), far-right militant and journalist.
- 31 August – Eladia Blázquez (b. 1931), tango singer and composer.
- 7 September – Nicolino Locche (b. 1939), boxer.
- 24 October – Ricardo Brinzoni (b. 1945), military officer, Argentine Army's Chief-of-staff.
- 11 November – Luis "Lucho" Olivera, 63, cartoonist.
- 11 November – Eduardo Rabossi, 75, philosopher and human rights activist.
- 20 December – Argentina Brunetti (b. 1907), actress and writer.

== Sports ==
See worldwide 2005 in sports

- 8 June: the Argentina national football team qualifies for 2006 FIFA World Cup by beating Brazil 3–1 in Buenos Aires.
- 26 August: Vélez Sársfield wins the 2005 Primera División Clausura tournament, with one round still to play.
- 31 August: Boca Juniors wins the Recopa Sudamericana 2005 4–3 on aggregate over Once Caldas (Colombia).
- 14 December: Boca Juniors wins the 2005 Primera División Apertura tournament on the last round.
- 18 December: Boca Juniors defeats UNAM Pumas on penalty shootout for the Copa Sudamericana 2005.
- 21 December: Tennis player Mariano Puerta is suspended for 8 years for his second doping offense.

== See also ==
- List of Argentine films of 2005
