= 2002 in Argentina =

- Decades: 1980s; 1990s; 2000s; 2010s; 2020s
- See also: Other events of 2002; List of years in Argentina

== Incumbents ==
- President:
  - Eduardo Camaño (until January 2)
  - Eduardo Duhalde (starting January 2)
- Vice President: Vacant

=== Governors ===
- Governor of Buenos Aires Province:
  - Carlos Ruckauf (until 3 January)
  - Felipe Solá (from 3 January)
- Governor of Catamarca Province: Oscar Castillo
- Governor of Chaco Province: Ángel Rozas
- Governor of Chubut Province: José Luis Lizurume
- Governor of Córdoba: José Manuel De la Sota
- Governor of Corrientes Province: Ricardo Colombi
- Governor of Entre Ríos Province: Sergio Montiel
- Governor of Formosa Province: Gildo Insfrán
- Governor of Jujuy Province: Eduardo Fellner
- Governor of La Pampa Province: Rubén Marín
- Governor of La Rioja Province: Ángel Maza
- Governor of Mendoza Province: Roberto Iglesias
- Governor of Misiones Province: Carlos Rovira
- Governor of Neuquén Province: Jorge Sobisch
- Governor of Río Negro Province: Pablo Verani
- Governor of Salta Province: Juan Carlos Romero
- Governor of San Juan Province:
  - Alfredo Avelín (until 22 August)
  - Wbaldino Acosta (from 22 August)
- Governor of San Luis Province: María Alicia Lemme
- Governor of Santa Cruz Province: Néstor Kirchner
- Governor of Santa Fe Province: Carlos Reutemann
- Governor of Santiago del Estero:
  - Carlos Ricardo Díaz (until 25 November)
  - Darío Moreno (25 November-12 December)
  - Mercedes Aragonés (from 12 December)
- Governor of Tierra del Fuego: Carlos Manfredotti
- Governor of Tucumán: Julio Miranda

=== Vice Governors ===
- Vice Governor of Buenos Aires Province:
  - Felipe Solá (until 3 January)
  - Vacant (from 3 January)
- Vice Governor of Catamarca Province: Hernán Colombo
- Vice Governor of Chaco Province: Roy Nikisch
- Vice Governor of Corrientes Province: Eduardo Leonel Galantini
- Vice Governor of Entre Rios Province: Edelmiro Tomás Pauletti
- Vice Governor of Formosa Province: Floro Bogado
- Vice Governor of Jujuy Province: Rubén Daza
- Vice Governor of La Pampa Province: Heriberto Mediza
- Vice Governor of La Rioja Province: Luis Beder Herrera
- Vice Governor of Misiones Province: Mercedes Margarita Oviedo
- Vice Governor of Nenquen Province: Jorge Sapag
- Vice Governor of Rio Negro Province: Bautista Mendioroz
- Vice Governor of Salta Province: Walter Wayar
- Vice Governor of San Juan Province: Marcelo Lima
- Vice Governor of San Luis Province: Blanca Pereyra
- Vice Governor of Santa Cruz: vacant
- Vice Governor of Santa Fe Province: Marcelo Muniagurria
- Vice Governor of Santiago del Estero: vacant
- Vice Governor of Tierra del Fuego: Daniel Gallo

== Events ==
=== January ===
- January 1: The Legislative Assembly gathers and chooses senator Eduardo Duhalde as interim president.
- January 2: President Duhalde announces the end of the 1:1 peso-dollar fixed exchange rate (convertibility) after almost 11 years.

=== June ===
- June 25: The exchange rate briefly reaches 4 pesos per U.S. dollar in the free market, which means the national currency has lost 75% of its value in 7 months.

=== September ===
- September 4: Argentina defeated the United States, 87–80, at the World Basketball Championships in Indianapolis, Indiana. It was the first loss ever in international play for a United States team containing National Basketball Association players.

== Deaths ==
=== March ===
- March 24: César Milstein, scientist, co-awarded the 1984 Nobel Prize for his work on monoclonal antibodies (b. 1927)

=== December ===
- December 23: Hilario Fernández Long, engineer and educator (b. 1918)

== Sports ==
See worldwide 2002 in sports
