= Eduardo Arnold =

Argentine politician

Eduardo Ariel Arnold
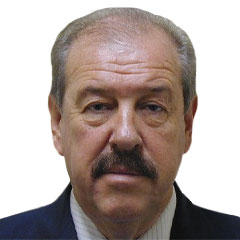

National Senator
- In office 10 December 1999 – 10 December 2001
- Constituency: Santa Cruz

National Deputy
- In office 10 December 2003 – 10 December 2007
- Constituency: Santa Cruz

Vice Governor of Santa Cruz
- In office 10 December 1991 – 10 December 1999
- Governor: Néstor Kirchner
- Preceded by: José Ramón Granero
- Succeeded by: Sergio Acevedo

Provincial Deputy of Santa Cruz
- In office 10 December 1983 – 10 December 1989

Personal details
- Born: 14 October 1947 (age 78) Las Heras, Santa Cruz Province, Argentina
- Party: Justicialist Party

Eduardo Ariel Arnold (born 14 October 1947) is an Argentine politician. He has been vice governor of the Santa Cruz Province under Néstor Kirchner, and a national senator and deputy.

== Biography ==
Eduardo Ariel Arnold was born in 1947 in Las Heras, Santa Cruz. Leading the "Movimiento Renovador Peronista", he allied with Néstor Kirchner in 1991 as vice-governor candidate. Kirchner became governor, defeating Arturo Puricelli. Arnold was selected to work in the 1994 amendment of the Argentine Constitution, and was elected vice governor under Kirchner again in 1995. Arnold was elected national senator for the 1999-2001 period. He was a national controller in Río Turbio in 2002.

After Kirchner became president of Argentina in 2003, Arnold desired to be the candidate for governor of the Santa Cruz province, but Kirchner selected Sergio Acevedo instead. Arnold was appointed secretary of provinces, under the ministry of interior Aníbal Fernández. He was elected deputy for Santa Cruz in 2003, and appointed vice president of the chamber. He supported all the bills sent by Kirchner, but Kirchner gradually distanced himself from Arnold because Arnold had criticized Kirchnerist politicians such as Luis D'Elía and Fernández. When he opposed a bill to increase the income tax because it did not increase the tax allowance as well, Kirchner ordered Arnold removed from the vice presidency.

Arnold tried to write a book about the early life of Néstor Kirchner. It was meant to contain both his own memoirs and other info that he had heard. This book has never been finished or edited, but he gave some information to journalist Luis Majul for his own book about Kirchner, El Dueño.

In 2013, Kirchner was posthumously accused of embezzlement in what became known as The K money trail scandal. Arnold subsequently told the TV program La cornisa that the Kirchner family had a bank vault at their home in Calafate that was unusually large possibly confirming the allegations. He also suggested that the Mausoleum of Néstor Kirchner may also contain a vault.
