= Carlos Enrique Gómez Centurión =

Argentine politician (1924–2018)

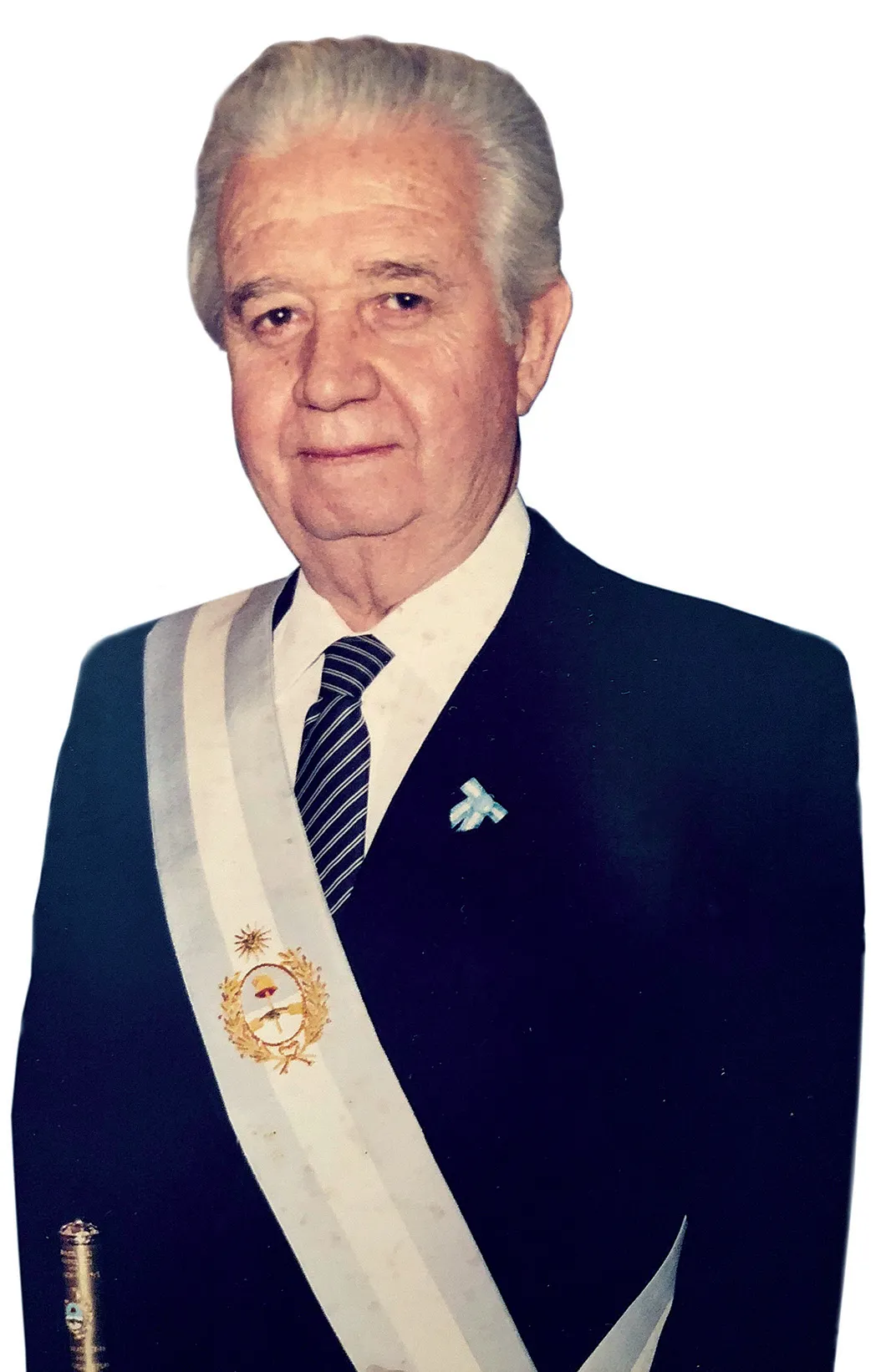
Photo of Carlos Enrique Gómez Centurión

Carlos Enrique Gómez-Centurión (17 May 1924 – 12 April 2018) was an Argentine politician.

He was born on 17 May 1924 to Carlos Gómez Centurión and Amelia Ugarte and studied geology at the National University of Córdoba. He joined the Radical Civic Union in 1962, and was appointed Governor of San Juan Province in 1971, leaving office two years later. Gómez Centurión contested the first directly elections for the same office in 1987, and won, serving until 1991. He was subsequently elected to the Chamber of Deputies for one four-year term. He died on 12 April 2018 of pneumonia, and was honored at the San Juan provincial legislature.
