= List of Argentine films of 2005 =

A list of films produced in Argentina in 2005:

Argentine films of 2005
Title	Director	Release	Genre
A - B
1420, la aventura de educar	Raúl Tosso		
Adiós, querida luna	Fernando Spiner		
... al fin, el mar	Jorge Dyszel		
El aura	Fabián Bielinsky		drama
Bone Breaker	Sergio Esquenazi		
Buenos Aires 100 kilómetros	Pablo José Meza		
Buscando a Reynols	Néstor Frenkel		
C - D
Cachimba	Silvio Caiozzi		
Cama adentro	Jorge Gaggero		
Cargo de conciencia	Emilio Vieyra		
Cautiva	Gastón Biraben		
Chagas, un mal escondido	Ricardo Preve		
Cielo azul, cielo negro	Paula de Luque y Sabrina Farji		
Cómo pasan las horas	Inés de Oliveira Cézar		drama
Como un avión estrellado	Ezequiel Acuña		
Cuando los santos vienen marchando	Andrés Habegger		
Dar de nuevo	Atilio Perin		
Di buen día a papá	Fernando Vargas		
La dignidad de los nadies	Pino Solanas		
E - L
Elsa y Fred	Marcos Carnevale		
Espejo para cuando me pruebe el smoking	Alejandro Fernández Mouján		
La esperanza	Francisco D'Intino		
El jardín de las hespérides	Patricia Martín García		
Géminis	Albertina Carri		
Grissinopoli	Darío Doria		Documentary
Habitación disponible	Eva Poncet, Marcelo Burd y Diego Gachassin		
Hermanas	Julia Solomonoff		
HIJOS, el alma en dos	Carmen Guarini y Marcelo Céspedes		Documentary
Historia de aparecidos	Pablo Torello	28 of April	Documentary
Iluminados por el fuego	Tristán Bauer		
Imposible	Cristian Pauls		
Kasbah	Mariano Barroso		
Locos de la bandera	Julio Cardoso		
M - P
Maten a Perón	Fernando Musante		
Meykinof	Carmen Guarini		
No tan nuestras	Ramiro Longo		
Oro nazi en Argentina	Rolo Pereyra		
Otra vuelta	Santiago Palavecino		
Paco Urondo, la palabra justa	Daniel Desaloms		Documentary
Papá se volvió loco	Rodolfo Ledo		
Plástico cruel	Daniel Ritto		
La film de Niní	Raúl Etchelet		
Pepe Núñez, luthier	Fermín Rivera		Documentary
PyME (Sitiados)	Alejandro Malowicki		
Q - T
Ronda nocturna	Edgardo Cozarinsky		
Rosas rojas... rojas	Carlos Martínez		
Sed, invasión gota a gota	Mausi Martínez		
Seres queridos	Teresa De Pelegrí y Dominic Harari		
Sólo un ángel	Horacio Maldonado		
La suerte está echada	Sebastián Borensztein		
El sur de una pasión	Cristina Fasulino		
Tango, un giro extraño	Mercedes García Guevara		
Tatuado	Eduardo Raspo		
Tiempo de valientes	Damián Szifrón		
U - Z
Un año sin amor	Anahí Berneri		
Un buda	Diego Rafecas		
Un minuto de silencio	Roberto Maiocco		
La vereda de la sombra	Gustavo Fabián Alonso		
Vida en Falcon	Jorge Gaggero		
La vida por Perón	Sergio Bellotti		
Vereda tropical	Javier Torre		
El viento	Eduardo Mignogna		
Whisky Romeo Zulu	Enrique Piñeyro		

== See also ==
- 2005 in Argentina

== External links and references ==
- Argentine films of 2005 at the Internet Movie Database
