= Héctor Icazuriaga =

Argentine government official

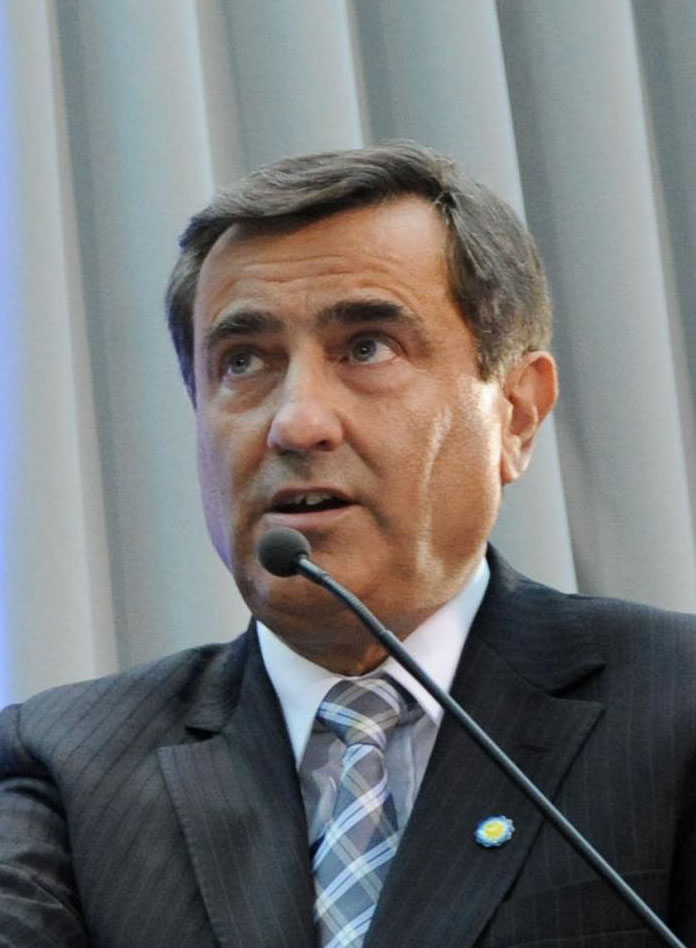

Secretary of Intelligence
- In office 10 December 2003 – 16 December 2014
- President: Néstor Kirchner; Cristina Fernandez
- Preceded by: Sergio Acevedo
- Succeeded by: Oscar Parrilli

Governor of Santa Cruz
- In office 24 May 2003 – 10 December 2003
- Vice Governor: Carlos Sancho
- Preceded by: Néstor Kirchner
- Succeeded by: Sergio Acevedo

Vice Governor of Santa Cruz
- In office 10 December 2001 – 24 May 2003
- Governor: Néstor Kirchner
- Preceded by: Sergio Acevedo
- Succeeded by: Carlos Sancho

Personal details
- Born: 9 January 1955 (age 71) Chivilcoy, Buenos Aires Province
- Party: Front for Victory
- Children: 2
- Education: University of Buenos Aires
- Profession: Lawyer

Héctor Icazuriaga (born 9 January 1955) is the former Secretary of Intelligence of Argentina who served from 2004 until 2014.

Icazuriaga was born in Chivilcoy, Buenos Aires Province to Basque Argentine parents (his Basque descent inspired his nickname, El vasco, though he is also known as Pancho and El Chango). He enrolled at the University of La Plata, and earned a juris doctor; he later married and had two children.

He relocated to Santa Cruz Province, where he was elected to the Provincial Legislature on the Justicialist Party ticket. Icazuriaga was elected vice president of the legislature by his peers, and upon Vice Governor Sergio Acevedo's election to the Argentine Chamber of Deputies in 1999, he was nominated as Governor Néstor Kirchner's running mate, taking office as vice governor on 10 December.

Kirchner's own election to the presidency in April 2003 led to Icazuriaga's appointment as governor. Acevedo, who had been named President Kirchner's first Intelligence Secretariat director, became a candidate for the post later that year, however, and upon the latter's election, Icazuriaga was named to replace him, effective 10 December 2004. He served President Néstor Kirchner, as well as his wife and successor, Cristina Kirchner, as Director of Intelligence, becoming among the longest-serving officeholders in the post's history. Icazuriaga enjoyed a relatively good working relationship with both Presidents Kirchner, though his deputy director, Francisco Larcher, is reportedly closer to the couple than the director himself.

== See also ==
- Francisco Larcher
- List of secretaries of intelligence of Argentina

Political offices
Preceded by Néstor Kirchner	Governor of Santa Cruz; 2003	Succeeded by Sergio Acevedo
Government offices
Preceded by Sergio Acevedo	Secretary of Intelligence; 2003 – 2014	Succeeded by Oscar Parrilli
