= Alfredo Avelín =

Argentine politician

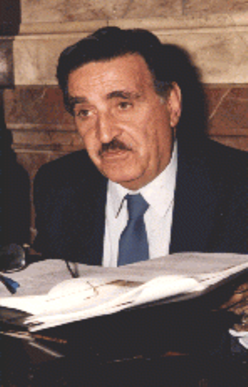

Governor of San Juan
- In office 1999–2002
- Lieutenant: Wbaldino Acosta
- Preceded by: Jorge Escobar
- Succeeded by: Wbaldino Acosta

Personal details
- Born: 1 May 1927 San Juan, Argentina
- Died: 26 January 2012 (aged 84) San Juan, Argentina
- Party: Alliance for Work, Justice and Education
- Profession: Physician

Alfredo Avelín (1 May 1927 – 26 January 2012) was an Argentine politician, physician and author. He served as Governor of his province of San Juan and as a member of the Argentine Senate and Chamber of Deputies.

Avelín was born in San Juan Province to parents of Lebanese descent. He earned a medical degree at the University of Córdoba, and later founded the Colegio Médico de la Provincia. Entering politics, he founded the Renewal Crusade party. He became Mayor of the provincial capital, San Juan, in 1958, at the age of 31.

He was ultimately elected to the Argentine Chamber of Deputies in 1989, and to the Argentine Senate, in 1992.

On 16 May 1999, Avelín was elected as governor of his province with 55%, heading the list of the Alliance for Work, Justice and Education, which would win the presidency of Argentina later the same year. He defeated the incumbent Governor, Jorge Escobar. Like the rest of the nation, San Juan experienced economic upheaval and unrest during his term in office; by 2001, wages were not being paid to provincial employees, and the province was bankrupt.

Following the downfall of the government of President de la Rua, Avelín was a fierce opponent of the austerity measures proposed by the International Monetary Fund, saying, "The only thing lacking for us is to pull down the Argentine flag and replace it with the IMF's." In 2002, Avelín was impeached and deposed as governor by a majority of provincial deputies following massive demonstrations.

Avelín considered running again for the governorship in 2007 against the incumbent, José Luis Gioja. His daughter, Nancy Avelín, who also served as a senator, was eventually the candidate for the Renewal Crusade that year.

Alfredo Avelín died on 26 January 2012.

Government offices
Preceded by Jorge Escobar	Governor of San Juan; 1999–2002	Succeeded by Wbaldino Acosta
