= Sergio Uñac =

Argentine politician

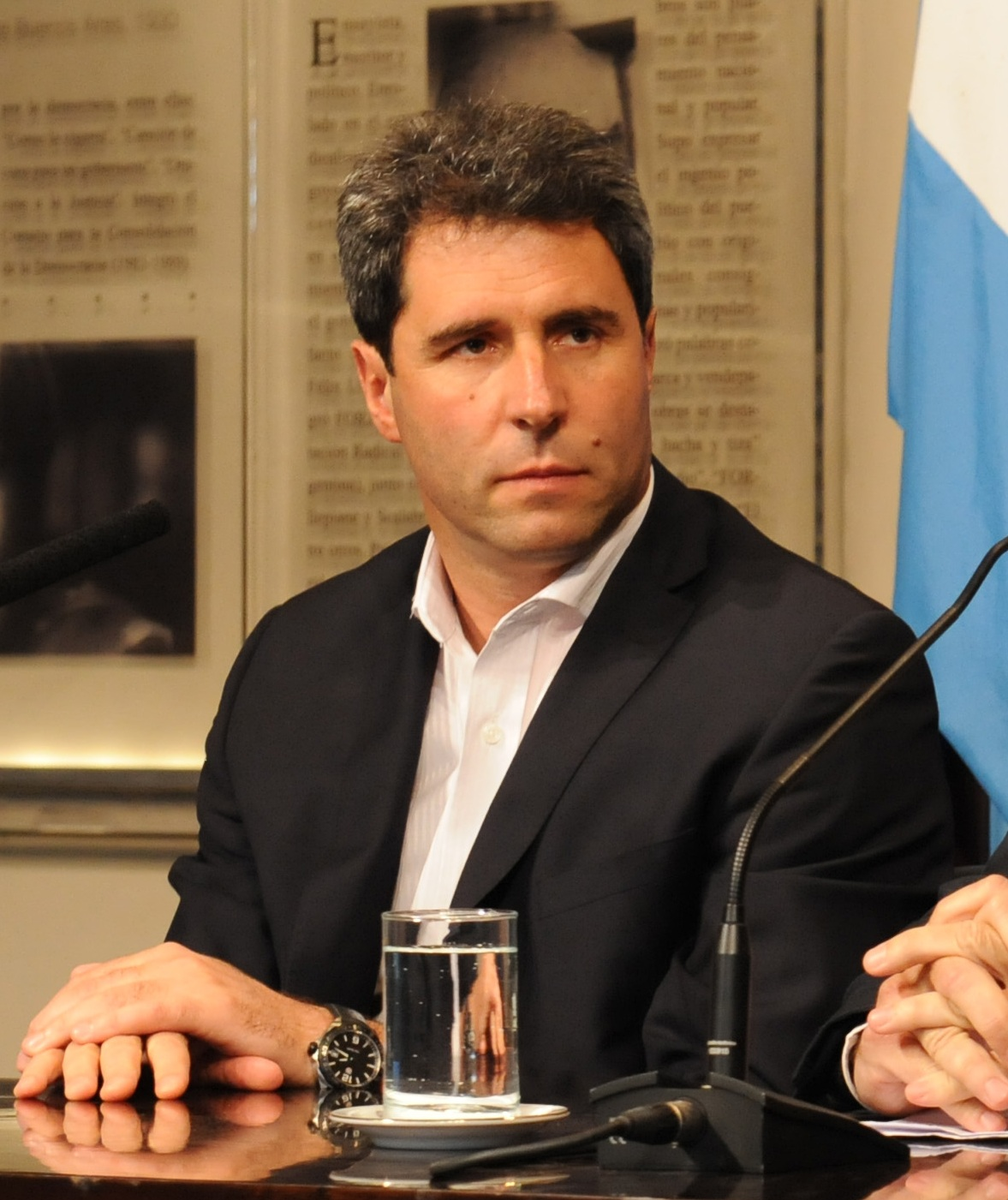

Governor of San Juan
- In office December 10, 2015 – 10 December 2023
- Vice Governor: Marcelo Lima; Roberto Gattoni
- Preceded by: José Luis Gioja
- Succeeded by: Marcelo Orrego

Vice Governor of San Juan
- In office December 10, 2011 – December 10, 2015
- Governor: José Luis Gioja
- Preceded by: Rubén Uñac
- Succeeded by: Marcelo Lima

Mayor of Pocito
- In office December 10, 2003 – December 10, 2011

Personal details
- Born: February 15, 1970 (age 56) Pocito, San Juan Province, Argentina
- Party: Justicialist Party
- Spouse: Silvana Rodríguez
- Children: 3
- Parent: Joaquín Uñac (father)
- Education: National University of Córdoba
- Profession: Lawyer

Sergio Uñac (born 15 February 1970) is an Argentine politician who served as governor of San Juan Province from 2015 to 2023.

== Biography ==
Sergio Uñac was born at Pocito on February 15, 1970. He is the son of the former mayor of Pocito Joaquín Uñac and he is of Lebanese descent by his mother side. He attended primary school at the Antonino Aberastain school, and ended high school education in 1987. He studied law at the National University of Córdoba and graduated as a lawyer in 1994. He was a member of the Juventud Universitaria Peronista during that time.

He was elected mayor of Pocito in 2003, and was re-elected in 2007. He became vice-governor in 2011, under José Luis Gioja. When Gioja was hospitalised following a helicopter crash, Uñac became the new interim governor on October 11, 2013. He led the state funeral for deputy Margarita Ferrá de Bartol, who died in the helicopter crash, and asked the population to stay calm and continue working as usual, despite the unprecedented event in the province. During his tenure he faced union requests from the vintners and medics. He negotiated with Barrick Gold in November, to prevent the corporation from leaving its operations in San Juan. In December, he dealt with police revolts, solved by increasing the police's wages. Gioja was rehabilitated on February 8, 2014, after 121 days of Uñac in government.

Unable to run for a new term, Gioja proposed Uñac as the new governor, in light of the good results of his brief tenure as interim governor. He was elected governor in the 2015 elections. His victory was well received by the mining and wine production sectors of the province.
