= Francisco Larcher =

Argentine government official

José Francisco 'Paco' Larcher was Argentina's Undersecretary of Intelligence, succeeded by Juan Martín Mena on December 16, 2014.

Larcher was born in Chaco Province. He is married and with three children.

Larcher was considered to be one of President Néstor Kirchner's most trusted advisors and closest friends, thought to be more powerful in SIDE (the Secretaría de Inteligencia) than the Secretary of Intelligence himself.

== See also ==
- Héctor Icazuriaga
