= Marcelo Orrego =

Argentine politician (born 1975)

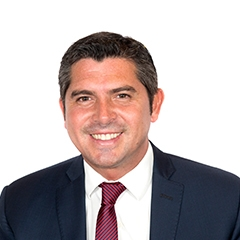

Governor of San Juan
- Incumbent
- Assumed office 10 December 2023
- Vice Governor: Fabián Martín
- Preceded by: Sergio Uñac

National Deputy
- In office 10 December 2019 – 10 December 2023
- Constituency: San Juan

Mayor of Santa Lucía
- In office 10 December 2011 – 10 December 2019
- Preceded by: Aníbal Fuentes
- Succeeded by: Juan José Orrego

Personal details
- Born: 29 January 1975 (age 51) Santa Lucía, San Juan Province, Argentina
- Party: Production and Labour
- Other political affiliations: Juntos por el Cambio (2019–present)
- Education: National University of Córdoba

Humberto Marcelo Orrego (born 29 January 1975) is an Argentine lawyer and politician, currently serving as Governor of San Juan since 2023. He previously served as National Deputy from 2019 to 2023, and as intendente (mayor) of his hometown, Santa Lucía, from 2011 to 2019. He is a member of the minor local Production and Labour party.

== Early life and career ==
Orrego was born on 29 January 1975 in Santa Lucía, the head town of the homonymous Santa Lucía Department, in southern San Juan Province. He studied law at the National University of Córdoba, graduating in 2001.

== Political career ==
Orrego served as an aide at the parliamentary office of Roberto Basualdo during Basualdo's term as National Deputy from 2001 to 2005. In 2007, Orrego ran for the mayoralty of Santa Lucía, but lost to Aníbal Fuentes. He ran again in 2011, this time winning against incumbent Fuentes. He was re-elected in 2015.

In the 2019 provincial election, Orrego ran for the governorship of San Juan Province, as the candidate of the Frente Con Vos and in alliance with Juntos por el Cambio. He received 32% of the vote, and lost to Sergio Uñac of the Justicialist Party, who received over 54% of the vote. Just months later, in the 2019 legislative election, Orrego ran for a seat in the lower house of the National Congress, as the first candidate in the Juntos por el Cambio list. The list received 38.37% of the vote, and Orrego was elected. He was succeeded in the Santa Lucía mayoralty by his brother, Juan José Orrego.

As a national deputy, Orrego formed part of the parliamentary commissions on Mining, Constitutional Affairs, Commerce, Sports, Mercosur, and Foreign Affairs. Orrego was an opponent of the legalization of abortion in Argentina, voting against the 2020 Voluntary Interruption of Pregnancy bill, which passed the Chamber and later went on to legalize abortion nationwide. He would later introduce a failed bill to repeal the Voluntary Interruption of Pregnancy law.

In 2021, he was subject to controversy when, during a parliamentary commission debate held through videoconference, he unwittingly turned his microphone on and was overheard insulting a legislative aide.

In the 2023 San Juan provincial election, Orrego became the provincial governor by defeating the Union for the Homeland's gubernatorial candidates, ending 20 years of Peronist rule in San Juan.

Political offices
Preceded by Sergio Uñac	Governor of San Juan; 2023–present	Incumbent
