= Wbaldino Acosta =

Argentine politician (1938–2007)

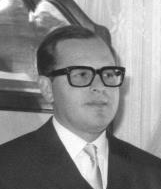

Governor of San Juan Province
- In office 22 August 2002 – 10 December 2003
- Preceded by: Alfredo Avelín
- Succeeded by: José Luis Gioja

Personal details
- Born: 1938 San Juan, Argentina
- Died: 1 August 2007 (aged 68–69) San Juan, Argentina
- Cause of death: Stroke
- Party: Renewal Crusade
- Spouse: Teresita Beatriz Zapata (m. 1970)
- Profession: Lawyer

Wbaldino Acosta (1938 – 1 August 2007) was an Argentine politician who served as Governor of his province of San Juan.

== Biography ==
Acosta was a lawyer and was active in public life, heading the provincial boxing federation in 1978. In 1971 he had joined the important San Juan party, the Partido Bloquista, led by Leopoldo Bravo who served several times as Governor and Senator. He became active in politics in 1981 becoming a provincial minister, then in 1983 the Chief of Police. In 1987, Acosta was elected vice-governor of San Juan with Carlos Gómez Centurión; the 1991 gubernatorial election, however, was won by the Justicialist Party.

On 16 May 1999, Acosta was elected once again as vice-governor of San Juan accompanying the Renewal Crusade party's Alfredo Avelín who won with 55%, heading the list of the Alliance for Work, Justice and Education which would win the Presidency of Argentina later the same year. Avelín's period in office was marked by economic turbulence and public unrest in San Juan, like the country as a whole. By 2001, provincial employees were not paid and the province had become insolvent.

In 2002, Avelín was impeached and deposed as governor by a majority of provincial deputies following massive demonstrations. Acosta's party had joined the opposition parties in deposing Avelín and Acosta was made governor. He stood in the subsequent 2003 election but came third behind José Luis Gioja of the Justicialist Party. He subsequently opposed his party's decision to back Gioja and the national government of Néstor Kirchner.

Acosta died aged 69 in 2007 following a brain haemorrhage. He had married Teresita Beatriz Zapata in 1970 and had three children.

== Notes ==
| Preceded by Alfredo Avelín | Governor of San Juan; 2002–2003 | Succeeded by José Luis Gioja |
