= Marcelo Lima =

Brazilian politician (born 1983)

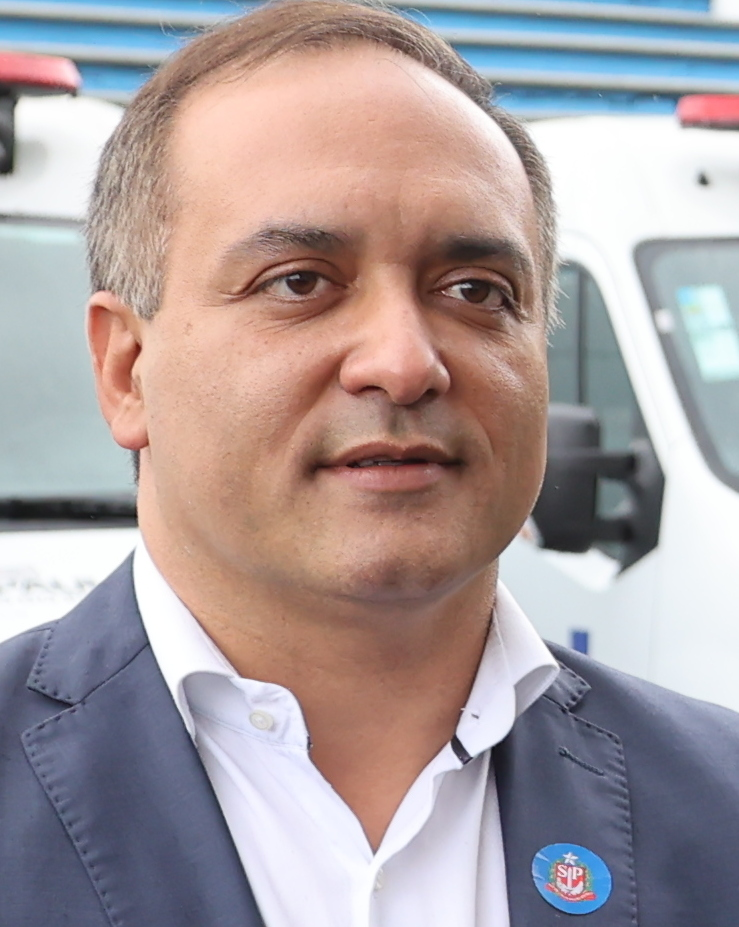
- Lima in 2022

Mayor of São Bernardo do Campo
- Incumbent
- Assumed office 1 January 2025
- Preceded by: Orlando Morando
- Succeeded by: Jéssica Cormick (Interim Mayor)

Personal details
- Born: 21 March 1983 (age 43) São Bernardo do Campo
- Party: Podemos (since 2024)

Marcelo de Lima Fernandes (born 21 March 1983) is a Brazilian politician serving as mayor of São Bernardo do Campo since 2025. From February to November 2023, he was a member of the Chamber of Deputies.
