= Fernando Sabsay =

Argentine historian and teacher

Fernando L. Sabsay (21 August 1919 – 26 April 2007) was an Argentine historian and teacher.
