= Sergio Acevedo =

Argentine politician

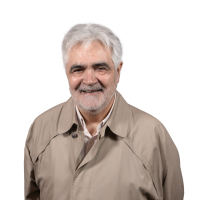

National Deputy
- Incumbent
- Assumed office 10 December 2023
- Constituency: Santa Cruz
- In office 10 December 2001 – 25 May 2003
- Constituency: Santa Cruz
- In office 10 December 1995 – 10 December 1999
- Constituency: Santa Cruz

Governor of Santa Cruz
- In office 10 December 2003 – 16 March 2006
- Vice Governor: Carlos Sancho
- Preceded by: Héctor Icazuriaga
- Succeeded by: Carlos Sancho

Secretary of Intelligence
- In office 25 May 2003 – 10 December 2003
- President: Néstor Kirchner
- Preceded by: Miguel Ángel Toma
- Succeeded by: Héctor Icazuriaga

Vice Governor of Santa Cruz
- In office 10 December 1999 – 10 December 2001
- Governor: Néstor Kirchner
- Preceded by: Eduardo Arnold
- Succeeded by: Héctor Icazuriaga

Provincial Deputy of Santa Cruz
- In office 10 December 1987 – 10 December 1991

Mayor of Pico Truncado
- In office 10 December 1991 – 10 December 1995
- In office 10 December 1983 – 10 December 1987

Personal details
- Born: Sergio Edgardo Acevedo; 1 May 1956 (age 70) Esquel, Chubut Province, Argentina
- Party: Justicialist Party (until 2023); SER Santa Cruz (since 2023)

Sergio Edgardo Acevedo (born 1 May 1956) is an Argentine politician, formerly a provincial governor of Santa Cruz Province and secretary in the national government.

Since 2023, he has been a National Deputy for Santa Cruz, a position he previously held on two separate occasions from 1995 to 1999 and later from 2001 to 2003. Having belonged to the Justicialist Party for most of his career, since 2023 he has formed part of the local SER Santa Cruz party, supporting current governor Claudio Vidal.

== Early life and career ==
Born in Esquel, Chubut Province, Acevedo moved to Pico Truncado in 1958. He became a lawyer and married, having three children. He was elected mayor of Pico Truncando in 1983, serving until 1987 when he became a provincial deputy. In 1991 he returned to be mayor. From 1995 to 1999, Acevedo was a national deputy, and became vice-governor of Santa Cruz Province under then-governor Néstor Kirchner. In 2001 he was elected once again to Congress.

== Later career ==
Acevedo was appointed Secretary of Intelligence by President Eduardo Duhalde, serving from 2002 to mid-2003. He was confirmed by President Néstor Kirchner, but later resigned to take up the post of Governor of Santa Cruz Province, swapping positions with Héctor Icazuriaga. He was elected with almost 75% of the popular vote.

Acevedo resigned as governor in March 2006 citing personal reasons. However, his resignation came after clashes with the national government and amid controversy over police brutality in repressing the Las Heras riot and a corruption scandal involving the family of President Kirchner. The President had himself been governor of Santa Cruz and there had been allegations that public contracts were granted based on bribes and kick-backs. Members of his family held senior positions and Acevedo retained Carlos Kirchner as his provincial minister of works. He was prevented from sacking Carlos Kirchner, allegedly due to interference from Buenos Aires. A judge, the President's nephew, declined to continue the investigation and Acevedo was replaced by Carlos Sancho, vice-governor and employer of the President's son.

It was widely speculated at the time that Acevedo resigned due to Presidential interference, in particular with oil and privatisation policy, and he has subsequently become a vocal, if equivocal, opponent of his former mentor and patron. He has set up a political faction, the Santa Cruz Coalition (Convocatoria Santacruceña), gathering together Peronists and others opposed to the Front for Victory of Kirchner and Cristina Fernández de Kirchner. Several provincial deputies and former provincial ministers joined the team.

== Return to politics ==
Following his reappearance on the political scene, there was speculation that Acevedo would run as running mate to Elisa Carrió or Adolfo Rodríguez Saá in the 2007 Presidential elections, but he ruled himself out at an early stage. His coalition, by now called 'New Movement' (Nuevo Movimiento) backed UCR Eduardo Costa for Governor of Santa Cruz, who was defeated by Kirchner's candidate Daniel Peralta in 2007, although the different opposition parties within the Change to Grow coalition fell out over the placings on the regional list for national deputies in the election. Nevertheless, Acevedo's team largely collaborated with opposition forces in municipal and provincial elections across Santa Cruz.

== See also ==
- Secretaría de Inteligencia (SIDE)
- List of secretaries of intelligence of Argentina

Government offices
Preceded by Miguel Ángel Toma	Secretary of Intelligence; 2003–2003	Succeeded by Héctor Icazuriaga
Political offices
Preceded by Héctor Icazuriaga	Governor of Santa Cruz; 2003–2006	Succeeded by Carlos Sancho
