= Murder of Axel Blumberg =

2004 kidnapping and murder in Argentina

Axel Blumberg
- Born: Axel Damián Blumberg; March 2, 1981; Argentina
- Died: March 22, 2004 (aged 23)
- Occupation: engineering student at the Technological Institute of Buenos Aires
- Father: Juan Blumberg

Axel Damián Blumberg (March 2, 1981 – March 22, 2004) was an Argentine engineering student at the Technological Institute of Buenos Aires, who died at the age of 23, after being kidnapped for several days in March 2004.

== Disappearance ==
He was returning from his girlfriend's home when he was intercepted by his kidnappers. Allegedly, local police were involved in the kidnapping or at least in the protection of the kidnappers. Neighbours of the kidnappers had called the police when they saw Blumberg escaping then being beaten by his captors; the police turned a blind eye. Argentina was at the time in the midst of a wave of extortive kidnappings, which often remained unsolved after badly conducted investigations. In three cases in that decade, the extortive kidnappings ended in murder: Juan Manuel Canillas, who was killed by his kidnappers in July 2002; Diego Peralta, in August of the same year; and the aforementioned Axel Blumberg, in March 2004.

== Aftermath ==
A large portion of Argentine society have viewed the police forces as corrupt and inefficient, political leaders as unsupportive, and penal laws excessively lenient; in this context, Blumberg's murder caused an uproar and was the catalyst for massive demonstrations, protesting the perceived impunity and supporting Axel's father, Juan Carlos Blumberg, in his search for justice.

== See also ==
- List of kidnappings
- List of solved missing person cases (2000s)
