= Mario Moine =

Argentine politician and businessman

Mario Armando Moine (born 13 November 1949) is an Argentine politician and businessman.

Moine was born in Tabossi, Entre Ríos, in 1949, and grew up in a nearby rural area, and well as in Maciá. Moine worked for the supermarket chain Los Hermanitos, and sold his holdings in the company in 1998 to invest in the InterTower hotel. He was affiliated with the Justicialist Party while serving as mayor of Paraná from 1987 to 1991, and as Governor of Entre Ríos Province between 1991 and 1995. Moine withdrew from politics in 2003, after his immediate successor as mayor, Julio Solanas, won Justicialist backing to run for a second term. Moine announced in July 2020 that he would return to politics, without formally participating in the Justicialist Party or actively campaigning for public office.

Moine's son Mario Gabriel Moine began his own political career in 2015.
