= Juan Carlos Blumberg =

Argentine activist

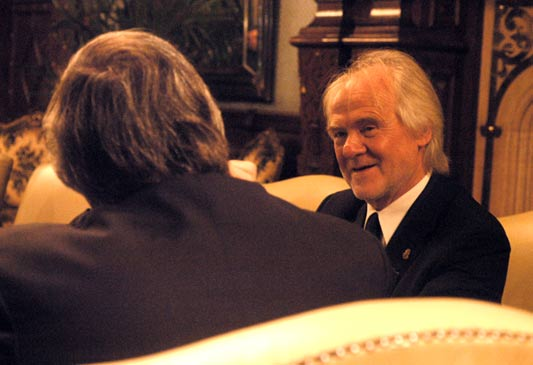
- Blumberg and Néstor Kirchner
- Born: February 7, 1945 (age 81)
- Occupations: Textile entrepreneur, victims' rights advocate
- Children: Axel Blumberg (deceased)

Juan Carlos Blumberg (born in 1945) is an Argentine textile entrepreneur and victims' rights advocate who rose to prominence following the 2004 murder of his son, Axel Blumberg.

== Early life and tragedy ==
Blumberg was born in Avellaneda, Buenos Aires, in a Jewish family of German and Lithuanian background. He enrolled at the National Technological University and pursued a degree in textile engineering, though he reportedly left in 1966 to pursue an interest in traditional Lithuanian dancing. Blumberg publicly referred to himself as an "engineer" graduate of Reutlingen University (Germany), although a journalistic investigation revealed on 15 June 2007 that this claim was false.

Blumberg lost his son Axel Blumberg, an engineering student, after a kidnapping resulted in the latter's murder on March 22, 2004. Argentina was at the time in the midst of a wave of extortion kidnappings, often remaining unsolved after badly conducted investigations; in three cases since 2001, the extortive kidnappings ended in murder: Juan Manuel Canillas, who was killed by his kidnappers in July 2002, Diego Peralta, in August of the same year, and the aforementioned Axel Blumberg, in March 2004.

A large portion of Argentine society viewed (and still views) the police forces as corrupt and inefficient, political leaders as non-supportive, and penal laws as excessively lenient; in this context, Axel Blumberg's murder caused an uproar and was the catalyst for massive demonstrations, protesting this perceived impunity and supporting Axel's father in his search for justice. The first such demonstration gathered more than 100,000 people.

He was named Humanitarian of the Year by the LatinTrade magazine the same year for his campaign Crusade for Axel.

== Blumberg as a public figure ==
Juan Carlos Blumberg claimed he wanted justice for his son's murderers, but even more importantly, a working system to ensure that such crimes stopped being common and that criminals were punished. He quickly became a model for victims' suffering families, and a media icon. The latter role brought upon him a large amount of media sentimentalism and sensationalism. Soon he also took a political stance, directly asking for legislators to harden crime laws he saw as sparing certain criminals from rightful punishment.

Very soon, right-wing political and ideological leaders took advantage of Blumberg's denunciations to criticize the policies of the national and local governments. Encouraged by this, Blumberg demanded to be received by the legislative chamber of the Autonomous City of Buenos Aires, and upon being invited, he gave a speech with his proposals. The legislators swiftly passed amendments to the penal laws as requested, which was later criticized as simply pandering to public opinion and introducing unsystematic changes for media effect only.

Finally, Axel Blumberg himself was somehow forgotten by public opinion, and the issue became increasingly politicized. As the wave of kidnappings abated, however, media focus shifted elsewhere.

Blumberg's association with traditional right-wing middle class ideology, coupled with his demands and denunciations, has caused him to become unpopular in the eyes of many Argentines. On one occasion he commented that human rights organizations support criminals' human rights, yet they had not supported him in his crusade. This complaint was not well received.

When he attended a support demonstration for the people killed in the fire of the República Cromagnon disco, he found a hostile reception, including shouts accusing him of being "a Nazi and a fascist". A demonstration organized by Blumberg on March 23, 2005, was only attended by about one thousand people.

Blumberg became a political figure as a result of his campaign. He has been courted by Mauricio Macri of the centre-right Commitment to Change party, possibly as a candidate to be governor of Buenos Aires Province for the PRO alliance.

Though he presented himself as an engineer, doubts arose in June 2007 about the validity of his degree and he finally admitted to holding no university title.

== The march on Plaza de Mayo ==
Blumberg led a new march on August 31, 2006, at the Plaza de Mayo. While the organizers estimated an attendance of 300,000 people, the media and police estimates ranged from 35,000 to 60,000, mostly middle-class residents of Buenos Aires. Although Blumberg explicitly stated that march did not a political end, he was accompanied by Mauricio Macri and Ricardo López Murphy, among other right-wing political leaders, as well as by a group of opposition piqueteros led by Raúl Castells. Blumberg repeated his demands of harder penal laws and lowering the age of criminal responsibility, and called for the rejection of the Argentine Penal Code reform project.

The march was denounced by members of the left as part of Blumberg's political campaign and as an excuse for right-wing demands. Government official and piquetero leader Luis D'Elía organized a "counter-march" and accused Blumberg of "using the pain of his son's death as a step" for political advance. He also noted the presence, in Blumberg's march, of people linked to the last dictatorship (notably retired Gen. Eduardo Cabanillas, Lt. Col. Emilio Nanni, and pro-military activist Cecilia Pando). Nobel Peace Prize Adolfo Pérez Esquivel organized a parallel protest to denounce the "criminalization of poverty" that allegedly underlies Blumberg's demands, but refused to appear next to D'Elía and later called him "a speculator".

== On racism and human rights and pain ==
After losing his son in brutal murder to kidnappers, Blumberg was interviewed in a show titled: "Theme of the week: A year without Axel" where he was shown frequently breaking down crying over his loss, adding Axel was not just a son but also a friend. He was pressed after a comment made on television. When asked by the journalist Nancy Pazos if he was racist, he answered: "Of course not, I even have Brazilian friends, they have white souls"

In the same interview, when questioned about his proposed penalty for murder, he answered "The only adequate penalty for a murderer is death, don't give me the 'human rights' speech". In the 2004 lecture he said "no human rights advocates came to me when my son was killed...no one came." His focus, since then, is his son, Axel.
