= Apocalypse 13 =

Apocalipsis 13
- Directed by: Óscar Aizpeolea
- Written by: Óscar Aizpeolea
- Starring: Fabio Aste; Maria Marchione; Leonardo Aguinaga; Pablo Ortolani
- Release date: 2003
- Running time: 95 minute
- Country: Argentina
- Language: Spanish

Apocalypse 13 (Spanish language:Apocalipsis 13) is a 2003 Argentine black and white drama film directed and written by Óscar Aizpeolea.

== Cast ==
- Leonardo Aguinaga
- Fabio Aste
- Emiliano Biasol as Copito
- Ivonne Fournery as Mater Dolorosa
- Alejandro Laurnagaray as Alfa
- Maria Marchione
- Juan Manuel Morales
- Pablo Ortolani
- Gaston Santamarina
- Leonardo Trento as Juglar
- Daniela Zuppi
