= Early life of Néstor Kirchner =

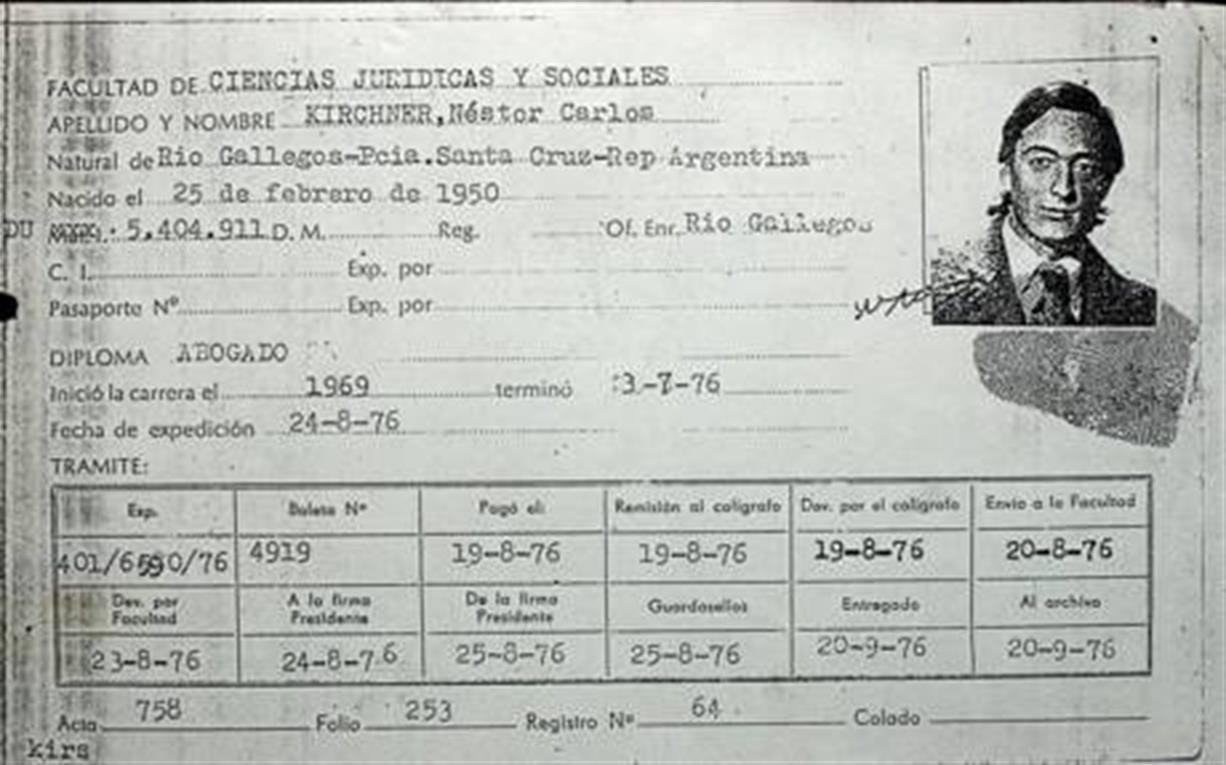
ID of Néstor Kirchner as a student of the University of La Plata.

Néstor Carlos Kirchner (25 February 1950 – 27 October 2010) was an Argentine politician who served as the 54th President of Argentina from 25 May 2003 until 10 December 2007. He was born in Río Gallegos, and moved to La Plata to attend university. As a student, he was very politically active, but left the city and returned to Patagonia at the start of the Dirty War.

== Family ==
Néstor Kirchner was in the third generation of the family living at Río Gallegos. His great-grandparents had moved from Interlaken in Switzerland to Patagonia by the end of the 19th century, during the big waves of immigration at that time. At the time Río Gallegos was a sparsely populated city. His grandparents established a warehouse named "Kirchner y Cuiñas", selling wood and metals. They had five sons, one of whom being Néstor Carlos. Néstor worked as mechanic and at a local cinema. He developed a mail friendship with a Croatian-Chilean from Punta Arenas, María Juana Ostoich Dragnic. They married and had three children: Alicia, María Cristina, and Néstor Carlos Kirchner, who was named after his father.

== Infancy and youth ==
The Kirchner family moved from their home in 1955, to another house where María Ostic lived until her death in 2013. Kirchner started elementary school the following year, and was forced to understand politics even at such early age. Because of the political turmoil of the country in those years, children were usually asked if their family was made of peronists or antiperonists, and had to be careful with their answer. His teacher Digna Inés Martínez Pérez would say years later that Kirchner was a good student.

Kirchner took part in his first political activities during high school, becoming president of the students' union. He organized a strike in support of a fired teacher during a visit of Juan Carlos Onganía to the city. During this time he developed strabismus, but refused to be treated. He considered his affected eye part of his identity. He could not become a teacher because of his poor diction. He joined a basketball team for some time, but was not successful at that either.

== University studies ==
Kirchner moved to La Plata in 1969 at the age of 19 to study law. The country was experiencing great political turmoil at that time, with the Rosariazo and the Cordobazo leading to the end of the rule of Onganía. The university was filled with students from all over Argentina and even from neighbouring countries, and most of them were politically active. There was a strong peronist presence, but also other political persuasions, such as supporters of the Radical Civic Union, and most political topics were discussed and disputed. However, the need to lift the proscription over peronism and allow the return of Juan Domingo Perón to the country was a political idea supported by all student groups, even non-peronists.

Kirchner joined the FURN (Spanish: Federación Universitaria de la Revolución Nacional), a group whose political affiliation is disputed. Some sources consider it to be a chapter of Montoneros in La Plata, while others consider that both organizations had contact and worked together on some issues, but without the FURN being part of Montoneros or directly involved in violent actions. In either case, the FURN was the first peronist group that had a presence in the University of La Plata. Kirchner was not one of the group's leaders, just a student among many others.

In 1972 he joined two political groups: "Trelew martyrs" and "John William Cooke". The name of the first one makes reference to sixteen guerrillas shot that year in the Trelew massacre, and the second was named after a leader of the left-wing peronism. Later in the year, he attended with the other members of the FURN the return of Perón at Ezeiza airport, an event that would become the Ezeiza massacre.

Kirchner later organized a meeting at Plaza Belgrano, with Héctor José Cámpora as the main speaker. The peronist slogan of the time was "Cámpora to the government, Perón to power". Campora would become president, and the FURN was thus legitimized, joining the Peronist University Youth. However, political peace was short-lived, and the Argentine Anticommunist Alliance started a persecution of armed political factions and youth organizations. Rodolfo Achem and Carlos Miguel, founding members of the FURN were shot two days after the death of Perón. During this time, Kirchner was among the peronists who did not support right-wing peronism, but had not become partisans either, and faced the risk of being attacked by either of the conflicting sides.

By this time Kirchner had met Cristina Fernández, three years younger than he was. The political turmoil made their romance short - only six months - before they were married. There was no religious ceremony, only a civil wedding, and Kirchner's friends sang "Los muchachos peronistas", a peronist hymn, during the event. After the wedding, they left the city (even though Cristina had not yet graduated) and returned to Río Gallegos. Both of them established a law firm in association with a local lawyer. Máximo, their first son, was born in 1977, and Kirchner was jailed for three days with the peronist leader Rafael Flores.

== Bibliography ==
- Alberto Amato (2010-10-28). Facundo Landívar (ed.). "1950 - 2010 / Néstor Kirchner, ex presidente de la Nación". Clarín (in Spanish). Special edition (23.293). Buenos Aires, Argentina. ISSN 1514-965X.
