= 2003 Santa Fe flood =

2003 Argentine flood

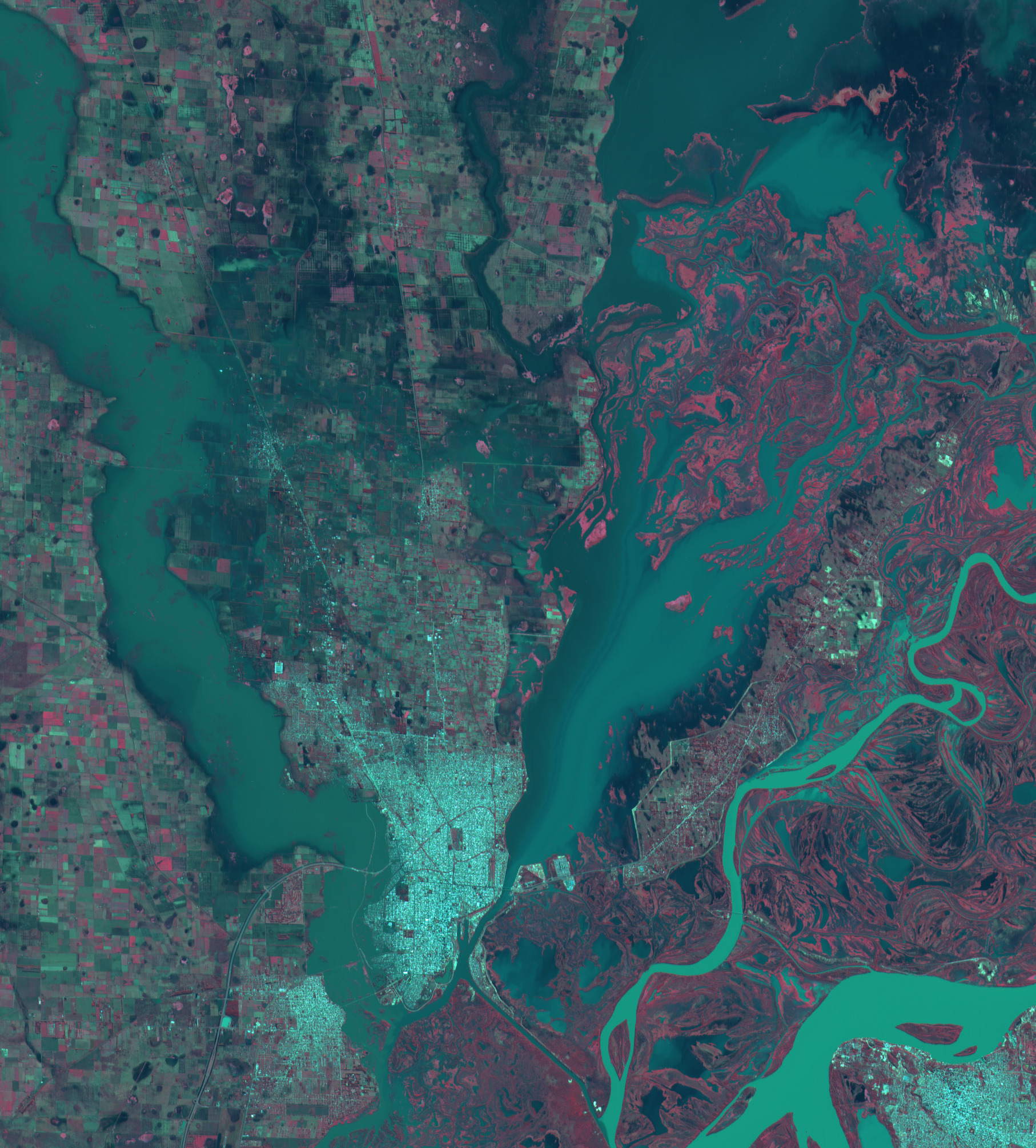
Santa Fe and its surroundings as seen by the SPOT-4 satellite on May 3, 2003.

Santa Fe, capital of the province of Santa Fe, Argentina, flooded in April 2003. Santa Fe is the fifth most populated city in Argentina (c. 370,000 inhabitants), and it is surrounded by rivers. The flooding was described as the worst since the city was founded in 1573.

At the end of April 2003, several days of heavy rainfall caused some major rivers in the Santa Fe area to rise as much as 50 cm in 12 hours. The water level of the Salado River (which flows through the north of the province and empties into the Paraná) rose by almost two metres in just three hours.

On 28 April, the Salado overflowed its margins and flooded large sections of Santa Fe. About 100,000 people had to be evacuated, 154 people died, and 28,000 houses were damaged or destroyed. A dyke had to be blown up in order for ease the flow of the floodwaters out of the city. In this key area for the agricultural and ranching industries, over 30,000 km^{2} of farmland were destroyed. The flood hit the capital hardest, but many other communities were also affected.

The flood was unusual because it is generally the east side of Santa Fe, beside the Paraná, which is affected by floodings. Salado River floodings are less usual.

Soon after the initial flooding, President Eduardo Duhalde declared the province a "disaster zone" and announced a $2 million emergency aid package. The World Bank later offered an additional $110 million. The Red Cross launched an emergency appeal in response to the flooding on 6 May.

According to a UN assessment requested by the provincial governor Carlos Reutemann, the total damages were about $1,000 million, and implied the loss of about 12% of Santa Fe's GDP.

The rains continued into the next days, exacerbating the catastrophe. As of 8 May, a quarter of Santa Fe remained under water. Precarious evacuation centres appeared in the capital and nearby towns to accommodate the evacuees.

The provincial government was heavily criticized for ignoring warnings about the possibility of a sudden rise of the Salado River, and for ignoring appeals to build the necessary preventive infrastructure to contain or divert floods. The official treatment of the people who lost their homes, possessions and jobs was also questioned; food relief and promised subsidies for reconstruction were insufficient. Governor Reutemann saw the end of his term in office marked by these problems. The critical situation of Argentina at the time (recovering from a major economic crisis) did not help. On 30 January 2004, nine months after the flood and under the administration of Jorge Obeid, a demonstration asking for government assistance to those affected by the flood ended with the burning of the government house's facade and several offices destroyed.
