= Claudio Vidal =

Argentine politician

Claudio Orlando Vidal
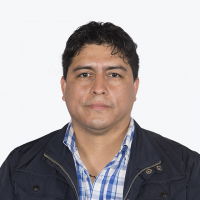

Governor of Santa Cruz
- Incumbent
- Assumed office 10 December 2023
- Vice Governor: Fabián Leguizamón
- Preceded by: Alicia Kirchner

National Deputy
- In office 10 December 2021 – 10 December 2023
- Constituency: Santa Cruz

Personal details
- Born: 4 June 1980 (age 46)
- Party: SER Santa Cruz (since 2019)
- Occupation: General Secretary of the Private Oil and Gas Union of Santa Cruz

Claudio Orlando Vidal (born 4 June 1980) is an Argentine trade unionist and politician currently serving as Governor of Santa Cruz Province. From 2021 to 2023, he was a National Deputy elected to represent Santa Cruz. He belongs to the local Somos Energía para Renovar Santa Cruz (SER Santa Cruz) party.

== Early life and career ==
Vidal was born in Comodoro Rivadavia, Chubut Province, but grew up in Río Gallegos, Santa Cruz Province, where he moved in his adolescence in search of job opportunities. He worked in the oil industry.

== Political career ==
He first ran for a seat in the Argentine Chamber of Deputies in the 2021 legislative election, as the first candidate in the "Somos Energía para Renovar Santa Cruz" (English: "We are energy to renew Santa Cruz"). He was elected with 46,633 votes, his list placing second behind Juntos por el Cambio with 28.25% of the vote.

== Electoral history ==
=== Executive ===
Electoral history of Claudio Vidal
| Election | Office | List | Votes | | | Result | Ref. |
| Election | Office | List | Total | % | P. | Result | Ref. |
|---|---|---|---|---|---|---|---|
| 2023 | Governor of Santa Cruz | Santa Cruz Puede | 54,831 | 28.38% | 1st (Note: Election held under ley de lemas. Data shown corresponds to the position within the most voted lema.) | Elected | |

=== Legislative ===
Electoral history of Claudio Vidal
| Election | Office | List | # | District | Votes | | | Result | Ref. |
| Election | Office | List | # | District | Total | % | P. | Result | Ref. |
|---|---|---|---|---|---|---|---|---|---|
| 2021 | National Deputy | Somos Energía para Renovar Santa Cruz | 1 | Santa Cruz Province | 46,633 | 28.25% | 2nd (Note: Presented on an electoral list. The data shown represents the share of the vote the entire party/alliance received in that constituency.) | Elected | |

Political offices
| Preceded by Alicia Kirchner | Governor of Santa Cruz; 2023–present | Incumbent |
