= Roberto Maidana =

Argentine journalist

Roberto Maidana (July 1, 1928 – August 11, 2007) was an Argentine journalist.

He was born in Buenos Aires. As a child, he was interested in literature and history, but chose to study law in university until 1950. During his long career he interviewed a number of high-profile personalities, including John and Robert Kennedy, Pandit Nehru, Juan Domingo Perón, Golda Meir, Anwar el-Sadat, Ernesto Guevara, Ayatollah Khomeini, Henry Kissinger, Wernher von Braun, Federico Fellini, Giulio Andreotti, Felipe González and Vittorio Gassman. He worked as a journalist since 1950, and was a member of the Argentinian National Academy of Journalism.

He died of pneumonia on 11 August 2007 in Villa Urquiza; he was buried in Pilar Partido.
