= Daniel Peralta =

Argentine politician

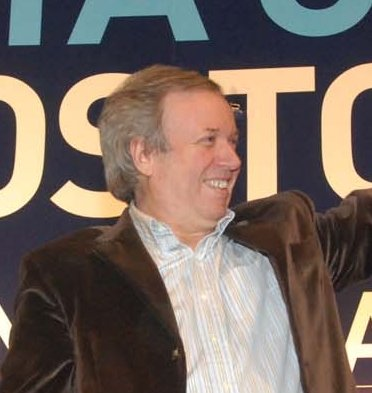
- Governor Daniel Peralta.

Governor of Santa Cruz
- In office 11 May 2007 – 10 December 2015; Acting to 10 December 2007
- Vice Governor: Hernán Martínez Crespo
- Preceded by: Carlos Sancho
- Succeeded by: Alicia Kirchner

Personal details
- Born: 1 July 1955 (age 70) Cañada de Gómez, Santa Fe Province
- Party: Justicialist Party
- Profession: Bank officer

Daniel Román Peralta (born 1 July 1955) is an Argentine Justicialist Party politician who was governor of Santa Cruz Province from 2007 to 2015.

== Early life and career ==
Peralta was born in Cañada de Gómez, Santa Fe Province. His parents, Nélida Cremona and Hugo Peralta, relocated to Santa Cruz Province and both became prominent Peronist figures there. Their son became a bank teller, and joined the Bank Employees' Union in 1973. He was named secretary general of the Bank Employees' Union of Santa Cruz in 1983, and later head of the provincial chapter of the CGT. Peralta was appointed Minister of Social Policy by Governor Ricardo del Val in 1988. He returned to the private sector in 1991 as manager of the Punta Arenas, Chile, branch of the then state-owned Bank of Santa Cruz, and in 1995 became manager of its central branch in Río Gallegos. Peralta led the transitional committee during the bank's 1996 privatization.

== Political career ==
Governor Néstor Kirchner, who had been a protégé of Peralta's parents, appointed him Secretary of Labour in 1999, and in 2003, he was elected to the Provincial Legislature on the Justicialist Party ticket. Kirchner, who became President of Argentina, appointed Peralta director of the state coal concern, Yacimientos Carboníferos Fiscales (YCF), in 2004. Taking a leave of absence from the party's regional congress, Peralta accepted the post following a mine accident which killed 14.

=== Governor of Santa Cruz ===
Upon incumbent governor Carlos Sancho's announcement of his resignation on 11 May 2007, in which he cited poor health (Sancho had himself taken office when the previous governor resigned amid scandal and fights with Kirchner), Peralta returned to his post as Provincial Deputy and was elected 1st Vice President of the Chamber of Deputies, effectively making him the legislature's senior member. This allowed him to be named acting governor upon Sancho's resignation.

In the general elections in October 2007, Peralta was officially elected Governor, beating UCR candidate Eduardo Costa by almost 20 points on the Kirchnerist Front for Victory slate; he was sworn into office in December 2007.

Peralta took office as Governor of Santa Cruz at a troubled time for the Province, amid strikes, sporadic riots, and allegations of police brutality; amid high levels of federal spending on local infrastructure projects the situation in the province later stabilized. Inheriting a growing pension system deficit, the governor ordered withholding rates increased and benefited trimmed for early retirees.

Governor Peralta continued to enjoy the support of President Cristina Fernández de Kirchner, the successor and widow of Néstor Kirchner. She defended the governor against calls from the opposition for impeachment following his refusal to reinstate Eduardo Sosa, a prosecutor who had been dismissed by then-Governor Kirchner in 1995, and who won a federal court ruling to that effect.

Peralta presided over a federally and provincially funded public works boom in Santa Cruz. Much as his predecessors did, however, Peralta faced restive labor unions in the province, and contended with a series of general strikes in the educational and petroleum sectors during 2011; strikes in the latter industry reportedly cost the province US$50 million in lost revenues, as well as over US$200 million in federal revenue.

Elections in 2011 returned both Governor Peralta and President Fernández de Kirchner to their respective offices. Their alliance was strained in 2012, however, by allegations the governor had the president spied upon during at least one of her frequent visits to her El Calafate family residence. Peralta concluded that the president was behind the Provincial Legislature's opposition to his budget proposal (which included a US$200 million deficit), and by September had broken with President Fernández de Kirchner outright.

Preceded by Carlos Sancho	Governor of Santa Cruz; 2007–2015	Succeeded by Alicia Kirchner
