= Jorge Busti =

Argentine politician (1947–2021)

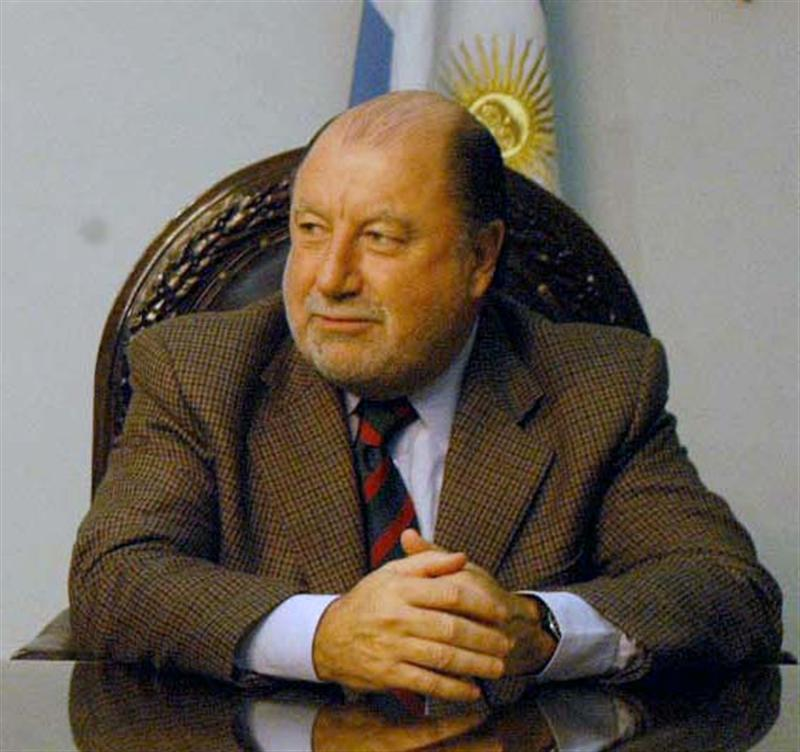
- Busti in 2007

Governor of Entre Ríos
- In office 2003–2007
- Lieutenant: Pedro Guastavino
- Preceded by: Sergio Montiel
- Succeeded by: Sergio Urribarri
- In office 1995–1999
- Lieutenant: Héctor Alanis
- Preceded by: Mario Moine
- Succeeded by: Sergio Montiel
- In office 1987–1991
- Lieutenant: Domingo D. Rossi
- Preceded by: Sergio Montiel
- Succeeded by: Mario Moine

Personal details
- Born: 18 October 1947 Concordia, Entre Ríos Province, Argentina
- Died: 20 December 2021 (aged 74)
- Party: Justicialist Party
- Profession: Lawyer

Jorge Pedro Busti (18 October 1947 – 20 December 2021) was an Argentine politician who served as Justicialist Party governor and senator for Entre Ríos Province.

== Life and career ==
Busti was born in Concordia, Entre Ríos on 18 October 1947, and graduated as a lawyer at the Universidad Nacional de Córdoba.

He served as Mayor of Concordia from 1983 to 1987, and was first elected governor in 1987. In 1991 he retired as governor and was once again elected Mayor of Concordia. From 1995 to 1999 Busti returned for a second term as governor, then in 1999 became a deputy in the Argentine Chamber of Deputies. In 2001, he was elected to the Argentine Senate, but stepped down in 2003 after being elected for a third term as governor. Two of his former vice-governors have been investigated or prosecuted for corruption.

Busti played a leading role in the 2005/6 dispute between Argentina and Uruguay over the proposal to build a pulp mill across the river from Entre Ríos. In 2007 he stood down as Governor and was elected to the provincial Chamber of Deputies.

He was married with three children. His wife, Cristina Cremer de Busti, was a member of the Argentine Chamber of Deputies representing Entre Ríos between 2007 and 2017. Busti died following heart surgery on 20 December 2021, at the age of 74.

Preceded by Sergio Montiel	Governor of Entre Ríos; 1987 – 1991	Succeeded by Mario Moine
Preceded by Mario Moine	Governor of Entre Ríos; 1995 – 1999	Succeeded by Sergio Montiel
Preceded by Sergio Montiel	Governor of Entre Ríos; 2003 – 2007	Succeeded by Sergio Urribarri
