= Renewal Crusade =

Argentine political party

The Renewal Crusade (Spanish: Cruzada Renovadora) is a political party in San Juan Province, Argentina.

The party was founded by Alfredo Avelín on 29 October 1960 (64 years ago) after he left the Radical Civic Union. Avelín would represent the party as Mayor of San Juan City and as national deputy and senator until 1999. In that year, Avelín was elected as Governor of San Juan heading an alliance of parties opposed to the Justicialist Party. He was impeached as governor in 2002 after a period of great financial instability and public unrest.

Avelín's daughter, Nancy Avelín, also represented the party in the Argentine Senate and stood for the governorship in 2007. Her brother Afredo Avelín Nollens was Mayor of San Juan from 1999 to 2003.

Afredo Avelín remains the President of the Party, with Avelín Nollens as Vice-President.
