= Governor of Entre Ríos Province =

Political position in Argentina

- Provincial coat of Arms

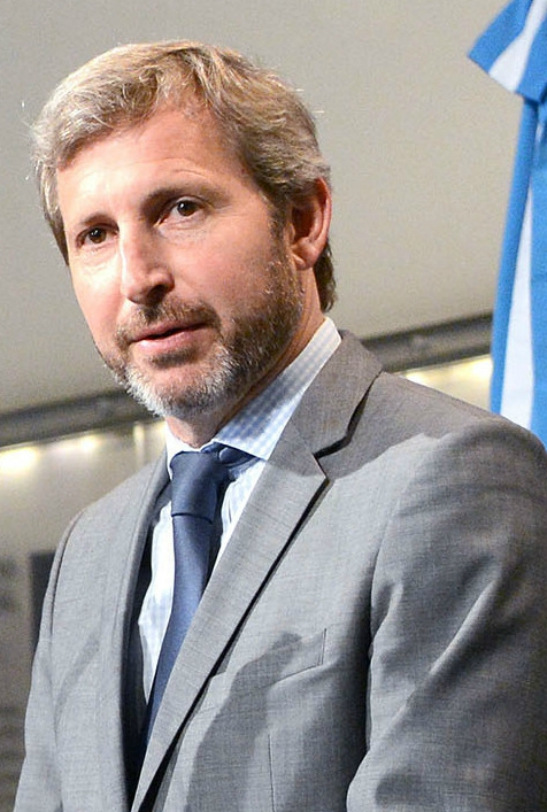
- Incumbent; Rogelio Frigerio since 10 December 2023
- Appointer: Direct popular vote
- Term length: 4 years
- Inaugural holder: Blas Pico

The Governor of Entre Ríos (Spanish: Gobernador de la Provincia de Entre Ríos) is a citizen of the Entre Ríos Province, in Argentina, holding the office of governor for the corresponding period. The governor is elected alongside a vice-governor. Currently the governor of Entre Ríos is Rogelio Frigerio.

== Governors since 1983 ==
| Governor | Term in office | Party | Election | Vice Governor |
|---|---|---|---|---|
| Sergio Montiel | 11 December 1983 – 11 December 1987 | UCR | 1983 | Jorge Martínez Garbino |
| Jorge Busti | 11 December 1987 – 11 December 1991 | PJ | 1987 | Domingo Daniel Rossi |
| Mario Moine | 11 December 1991 – 11 December 1995 | PJ | 1991 | Hernán Orduna |
| Jorge Busti | 11 December 1995 – 11 December 1999 | PJ | 1995 | Héctor Alanis |
| Sergio Montiel | 11 December 1999 – 11 December 2003 | UCR | 1999 | Edelmiro Tomás Pauletti |
| Jorge Busti | 11 December 2003 – 11 December 2007 | PJ | 2003 | Pedro Guastavino |
| Sergio Urribarri | 11 December 2007 – 11 December 2015 | PJ | 2007 | José Lauritto |
| Sergio Urribarri | 11 December 2007 – 11 December 2015 | PJ | 2011 | José Orlando Cáceres |
| Gustavo Bordet | 11 December 2015 – Incumbent | PJ | 2015 | Adán Bahl |
| Gustavo Bordet | 11 December 2015 – Incumbent | PJ | 2019 | María Laura Stratta |

== See also ==
- Legislature of Entre Ríos
  - Senate of Entre Ríos
  - Chamber of Deputies of Entre Ríos
