= Sergio Montiel =

Argentine politician (1927–2011)

Sergio Alberto Montiel (October 20, 1927 – November 1, 2011) was an Argentine politician, lawyer, and professor of constitutional law at the National University of the Littoral. Montiel served as Governor of Entre Ríos Province for two nonconsecutive terms: He was first elected on October 30, 1983, and served his first term until 1987. Montiel served a second gubernatorial term from 1999 to 2003. Montiel supported nationalization and opposed the 1993 Pact of Olivos.

Montiel was born in October 20, 1927, in Concepción del Uruguay, Argentina. He died of cardiac arrest at Militar de Paraná, a military hospital in Paraná, Entre Ríos, on November 1, 2011, at the age of 84.

He was an active freemason.
