= Governor of San Juan Province =

- Provincial coat of Arms
- Incumbent; Marcelo Orrego since 10 December 2023
- Appointer: Direct popular vote
- Term length: 4 years (renewable once)
- Inaugural holder: Saturnino Sarassa

The Governor of San Juan Province (Spanish: Gobernador de la provincia de San Juan) is a citizen of the San Juan Province, in Argentina, holding the office of governor for the corresponding period. The governor is elected alongside a vice-governor. As of 2023 the Governor of San Juan is Marcelo Orrego.

== Governors since 1983 ==
Governor	Term in office	Party	Election	Vice Governor
Leopoldo Bravo	10 December 1983 – 6 December 1985	PB	1983	Jorge Ruiz Aguilar
Jorge Ruiz Aguilar	7 December 1985 – 10 December 1987	PB	1983	Vacant
Carlos Enrique Gómez Centurión	10 December 1987 – 10 December 1991	PB	1987	Wbaldino Acosta
Jorge Escobar	10 December 1991 – 17 December 1992	PJ	1991	Juan Rojas
Juan Rojas	17 December 1992 – 28 December 1994	PJ	1991	Vacant
Jorge Escobar	28 December 1994 – 10 December 1999	PJ	1991	Juan Rojas
Jorge Escobar	28 December 1994 – 10 December 1999	PJ	1995	Rogelio Rafael Cerdera
Alfredo Avelín	10 December 1999 – 22 August 2002	CR	1999	Wbaldino Acosta
Wbaldino Acosta	22 August 2002 – 10 December 2003	PB	1999	Vacant
José Luis Gioja	10 December 2003 – 10 December 2015	PJ	2003	Marcelo Lima
José Luis Gioja	10 December 2003 – 10 December 2015	PJ	2007	Rubén Uñac
José Luis Gioja	10 December 2003 – 10 December 2015	PJ	2011	Sergio Uñac
Sergio Uñac	10 December 2015 – 10 December 2023	PJ	2015	Marcelo Lima
Sergio Uñac	10 December 2015 – 10 December 2023	PJ	2019	Roberto Gattoni
Marcelo Orrego	10 December 2023 – Incumbent	PyT	2023	Fabián Martín

== See also ==
- Chamber of Deputies of San Juan
