= Pedro Guastavino =

Argentine politician

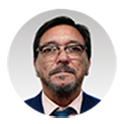

National Senator
- In office 10 December 2007 – 10 December 2019
- Constituency: Entre Ríos

Vice Governor of Entre Ríos
- In office 2003 – 10 December 2007
- Governor: Jorge Busti

Personal details
- Born: July 1, 1954 (age 71) Gualeguaychú
- Party: Justicialist Party
- Profession: Lawyer

Pedro Guillermo Angel Guastavino (born 1 July 1954 in Gualeguaychú) is an Argentine Justicialist Party politician. Between 2007 and 2019, he sat in the Argentine Senate representing Entre Ríos Province in the block of the majority Front for Victory.

Guastavino qualified as a lawyer at the National University of La Plata. In 1987 he joined the national government as Director of Promotion at the Ministry of Social Action, then becoming subsecretary of social action in the same ministry. From 1991 he worked as Director of the Institute of Financial Assistance at the Social Action Ministry.

In 1995, he became President of the Gualeguaychú Justicialist Party and in 1999 he was elected a provincial deputy for Gualeguaychú. Guastavino was elected vice governor of Entre Ríos in 2003 as the running mate of Jorge Busti. At the end of his term of office, he was elected senator for the province and took office in December 2007.
