= José Luis Gioja =

Argentine politician (born 1949)

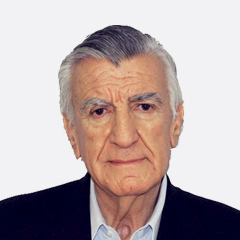

National Deputy
- In office 10 December 2015 – 10 December 2023
- Constituency: San Juan
- In office 10 December 1991 – 29 November 1995
- Constituency: San Juan

President of the Justicialist Party
- In office 3 May 2016 – 21 March 2021
- Preceded by: Eduardo Fellner
- Succeeded by: Alberto Fernández

Governor of San Juan
- In office 10 December 2003 – 10 December 2015
- Vice Governor: Marcelo Lima; Rubén Uñac; Sergio Uñac
- Preceded by: Wbaldino Acosta
- Succeeded by: Sergio Uñac

Provisional President of the Senate
- In office 27 December 2002 – 4 December 2003
- Preceded by: Juan Carlos Maqueda
- Succeeded by: Marcelo Guinle

National Senator
- In office 29 November 1995 – 4 December 2003
- Constituency: San Juan Province

Personal details
- Born: 4 December 1949 (age 76) Rawson, San Juan Province, Argentina
- Party: Justicialist Party
- Other political affiliations: Front for Victory (2003–2017); Citizen's Unity (2017–2019); Frente de Todos (2019–present)
- Profession: Agronomist
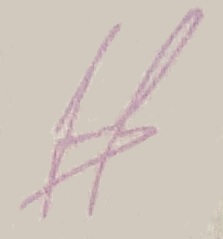
- Signature

José Luis Gioja (born 1949) is an Argentine Justicialist Party (PJ) politician, former governor of San Juan Province and former President of the Argentine Senate.

== Early life and education ==
Gioja was born in Rawson, a suburb of San Juan, Argentina, in 1949. He was raised in nearby San José de Jáchal, and earned a teaching diploma at the local normal school. He enrolled at the National University of Cuyo, and in his senior year, was elected President of the National University Student Association (ANEU), graduating with a degree in agronomy in 1973.

He married the former Rosa Palacio, with whom he had four children. Governor Eloy Camus named Gioja his private secretary upon taking office in 1973, and the latter also served as San Juan chapter President of Juventud Peronista (Peronist Youth). In 1976, whilst working for the provincial government, Gioja was detained in a forced disappearance by the military authorities following the March 1976 coup. He was imprisoned for nine months, and has claimed that he was tortured by Major Jorge Olivera.

== Political career ==
In 1991, Gioja was elected to the Argentine Chamber of Deputies for San Juan for the Popular Justicialist Front. He was re-elected in 1995, but took a seat as a senator following constitutional reform increasing the number of senators. He was re-elected to the Senate in 2001 and led the Peronist bloc in the Senate from 2000, serving as Provisional Senate President from 2002 to 2003. He has been implicated in the Senate scandal in which State Intelligence funds were allegedly used to bribe senators for their vote on a 2000 labour reform package advanced by the President of Argentina at the time, Fernando de la Rúa.

Gioja was elected governor in 2003 with the backing of the Front for Victory faction allied to Néstor Kirchner, and was reelected twice as governor, in 2007 and in 2011, increasing his majority every time and winning over 68% of the vote in the 2011 election.

He was victim of a helicopter crash on October 11, 2013, during the political campaign for the 2013 legislative election. He was hospitalized immediately. The national deputy Margarita Ferrá de Bartol died in the accident, and the secretary Héctor Pérez and the national deputy Daniel Tomas were hospitalized as well.

His elder brother César Gioja is a senator. Another brother, Juan Carlos Gioja, has been a national deputy.

On 26 April 2016, he is elected head of the Justicialist Party.

Party political offices
Preceded by Eduardo Fellner	President of the Justicialist Party; 2016–2021	Succeeded by Alberto Fernández
Political offices
Preceded by Juan Carlos Maqueda	Provisional President of the Senate; 2002–2003	Succeeded by Marcelo Guinle
Preceded by Wbaldino Acosta	Governor of San Juan; 2003–2015	Succeeded by Sergio Uñac
