= Carlos Sancho =

Argentine politician

Carlos Alberto Sancho is an Argentine Justicialist Party (PJ) politician and former governor of Santa Cruz Province.

Sancho ran the family real estate and construction firm. A supporter of Governor Néstor Kirchner, he became a member of the Deliberative Council of the city of Río Gallegos (the capital of Santa Cruz) in 1999, before becoming president of the city council in 2002. He was elected vice-governor with Sergio Acevedo, on the Front for Victory slate, in 2003; the leader of the Front for Victory, Kirchner, had become President of Argentina in May.

Governor Sergio Acevedo resigned in March 2006, in the midst of a scandal concerning the treatment of prisoners, and Sancho was sworn in as governor on March 17. He was taken seriously ill on June 30 with a fever and was rushed to hospital in Buenos Aires; after some weeks in hospital, he was able to return to his position in Santa Cruz.

On 10 May 2007, after more than two months of social unrest, Sancho resigned. Strikes and demonstrations organized by the teachers' union of the province to demand better salaries, countered by violent police repression, eroded his image and popular support. His successor, appointed to complete his mandate until the elections in October, was provincial deputy Daniel Peralta.

Preceded by Sergio Acevedo	Governor of Santa Cruz; 2006–2007	Succeeded by Daniel Peralta
