= Governor of Santa Cruz Province =

Argentinian governmental position

- Coat of arms of Santa Cruz Province

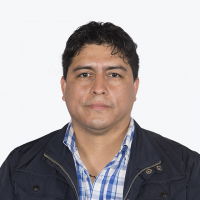
- Incumbent; Claudio Vidal since 10 December 2023
- Status: Head of the local government
- Appointer: Direct popular vote
- Term length: 4 years
- Inaugural holder: Mario Castulo Paradelo
- Formation: 1958
- Website: Official website

The Governor of Santa Cruz (Spanish: Gobernador de la Provincia de Santa Cruz) is a citizen of the Santa Cruz Province, in Argentina, holding the office of governor for the corresponding period. The governor is elected alongside a vice-governor. Since 2023, the governor of Santa Cruz has been Claudio Vidal.

== Governors since 1983 ==
| Governor | Term in office | Party | Election | Vice Governor |
|---|---|---|---|---|
| Arturo Puricelli | 10 December 1983 – 10 December 1987 | PJ | 1983 | Francisco Patricio Toto |
| Ricardo del Val | 10 December 1987 – 6 July 1990 | PJ | 1987 | José Ramón Granero |
| José Ramón Granero | 6 July 1990 – 15 March 1991 | PJ | 1987 | Vacant |
| Héctor Marcelino García | 15 March 1991 – 10 December 1991 | PJ | —N/a | Vacant |
| Néstor Kirchner | 10 December 1991 – 24 May 2003 | PJ | 1991 | Eduardo Arnold |
| Néstor Kirchner | 10 December 1991 – 24 May 2003 | PJ | 1995 | Eduardo Arnold |
| Néstor Kirchner | 10 December 1991 – 24 May 2003 | PJ | 1999 | Sergio Acevedo |
| Néstor Kirchner | 10 December 1991 – 24 May 2003 | PJ | 1999 | Héctor Icazuriaga |
| Héctor Icazuriaga | 24 May 2003 – 10 December 2003 | PJ | —N/a | Vacant |
| Sergio Acevedo | 10 December 2003 – 30 March 2006 | PJ | 2003 | Carlos Sancho |
| Carlos Sancho | 30 March 2006 – 10 May 2007 | PJ | 2003 | Vacant |
| Daniel Peralta | 10 May 2007 – 10 December 2015 | PJ | —N/a | Vacant |
| Daniel Peralta | 10 May 2007 – 10 December 2015 | PJ | 2007 | Luis Martínez Crespo |
| Daniel Peralta | 10 May 2007 – 10 December 2015 | PJ | 2011 | Fernando Cotillo |
| Alicia Kirchner | 10 December 2015 – 10 December 2023 | Kolina | 2015 | Pablo González |
| Alicia Kirchner | 10 December 2015 – 10 December 2023 | Kolina | 2019 | Eugenio Quiroga |
| Claudio Vidal | 10 December 2023 – Incumbent | SER Santa Cruz | 2023 | Fabián Leguizamón |

== See also ==
- Chamber of Deputies of Santa Cruz
