= María Laura Stratta =

Argentine politician

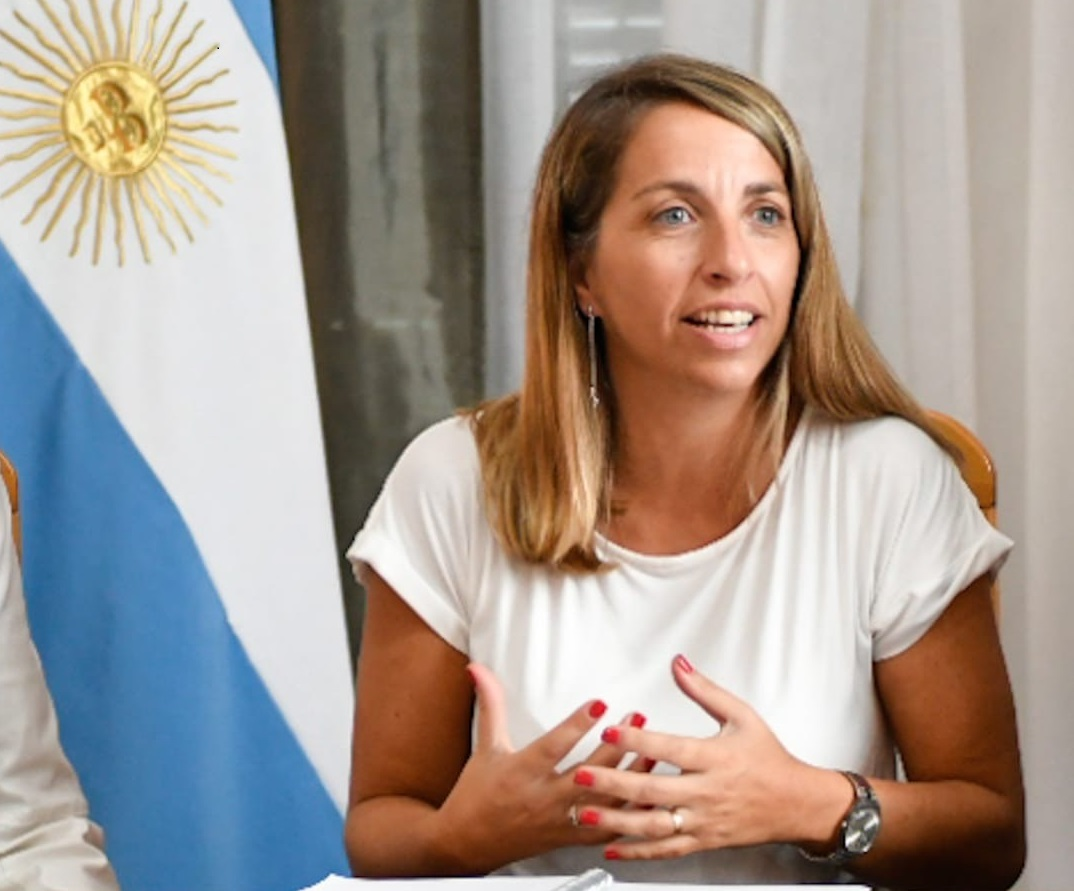

Vice Governor of Entre Ríos
- In office 10 December 2019 – 10 December 2023
- Governor: Gustavo Bordet
- Preceded by: Adán Bahl
- Succeeded by: Alicia Aluani

Minister of Social Development of Entre Ríos
- In office 12 December 2015 – 10 December 2019
- Preceded by: Carlos Ramos
- Succeeded by: Marisa Paira

Provincial Deputy of Entre Ríos
- In office 11 December 2011 – 11 December 2015
- Constituency: Victoria Department

Personal details
- Born: 22 February 1976 (age 50) Victoria, Entre Ríos, Argentina
- Party: Justicialist Party
- Education: National University of Entre Ríos

María Laura Stratta (born 22 February 1976) is an Argentine politician. She served as Vice Governor of Entre Ríos Province, deputising for Governor Gustavo Bordet, from 2019 to 2023. From 2015 to 2019, Stratta served as Minister of Social Development of her province, having previously served as a member of the provincial Chamber of Deputies.

She is a member of the Justicialist Party.

== Early life and education ==
María Laura Stratta was born on 22 February 1976 in Victoria, Entre Ríos Province. Her mother was a high school teacher, while her father, Juan Carlos Stratta, was active in provincial politics: he was intendente (mayor) of Victoria from 1987 to 1991, and served in both houses of the provincial Legislature.

Stratta has a degree in communication studies from the National University of Entre Ríos, in Concepción del Uruguay.

== Political career ==
Stratta's political activism began in the Justicialist Party. She was the provincial representative of the Social Development Ministry's Banco Popular de la Buena Fe programme.

In the 2011 provincial elections, she was elected to the Chamber of Deputies of Entre Ríos as part of the Justicialist Party list in Victoria Department. During her four-year term, she presided the parliamentary commission on General Legislation and served as president of the province's Scholarships Institute. She also authored Law 10.151, which sought to boost the provincial state's welfare investment.

Upon the end of her term as legislator, in December 2015, she was appointed by newly elected governor Gustavo Bordet as Minister of Social Development of Entre Ríos. She additionally served as a legislative aide to a number of national congresspeople and in the 2008 Constitutional Convention of Entre Ríos.

=== Vice Governor ===
Ahead of the 2019 general election, Governor Gustavo Bordet announced Stratta would be his running mate in his re-election bid as part of the Frente Justicialista CREER The ticket won with over 57% of the vote, and the two were elected. Stratta is the first female vice governor of Entre Ríos.

== Personal life ==
Stratta is married and has two children, Juan and Bruno.
