= Visión Ovni =

Argentine UFO research organization

Vision Ovni
- Founded: 1991
- Headquarters: Argentina
- Website: https://www.visionovni.com.ar

Vision Ovni, founded in 1991, is an Argentine national UFO research organisation.

During mid-1991 Vision Ovni started its operations at Victoria, Entre Rios city. The Argentine press started reporting sightings of strange lights coming from Laguna del Pescado lake. Many people saw this phenomenon, and national TV recorded the phenomena which have not yet been studied in detail by universities or UFO researchers. Press coverage of UFO sightings was high during the 1990s to nowadays.

Small groups existed in several of Argentina's cities but no one resided in Victoria until Vision Ovni was formed. During the 1970s, Argentine army scanned Laguna del Pescado bottom lake in search of strange phenomena. Most were convinced that strange lights resided there.

In 2009 Vision Ovni and many others UFO researchers formed Cefora, an Argentine organization to study the UFO Phenomena in detail. Silvia Simondini and many others started collecting signs to obtain Argentine UFO declassification archives.

== Objectives ==
The objectives of Vision Ovni are:

1. Research and identify reports of UFO phenomena through gathering and investigating sighting accounts, as well as inform the public through Vision Ovni radio.
2. Collect, process and study all available information on UFOs in Argentina.
3. Strive for the use of scientific principles and methods in its investigation.
4. Be open to any and all hypotheses and theories which may represent possible solutions to the UFO enigma, and will not attribute unidentified reports to any particular theory.
