= Luis Falcón =

Spanish computer scientist, physician, and activist

Luis Falcón Martín
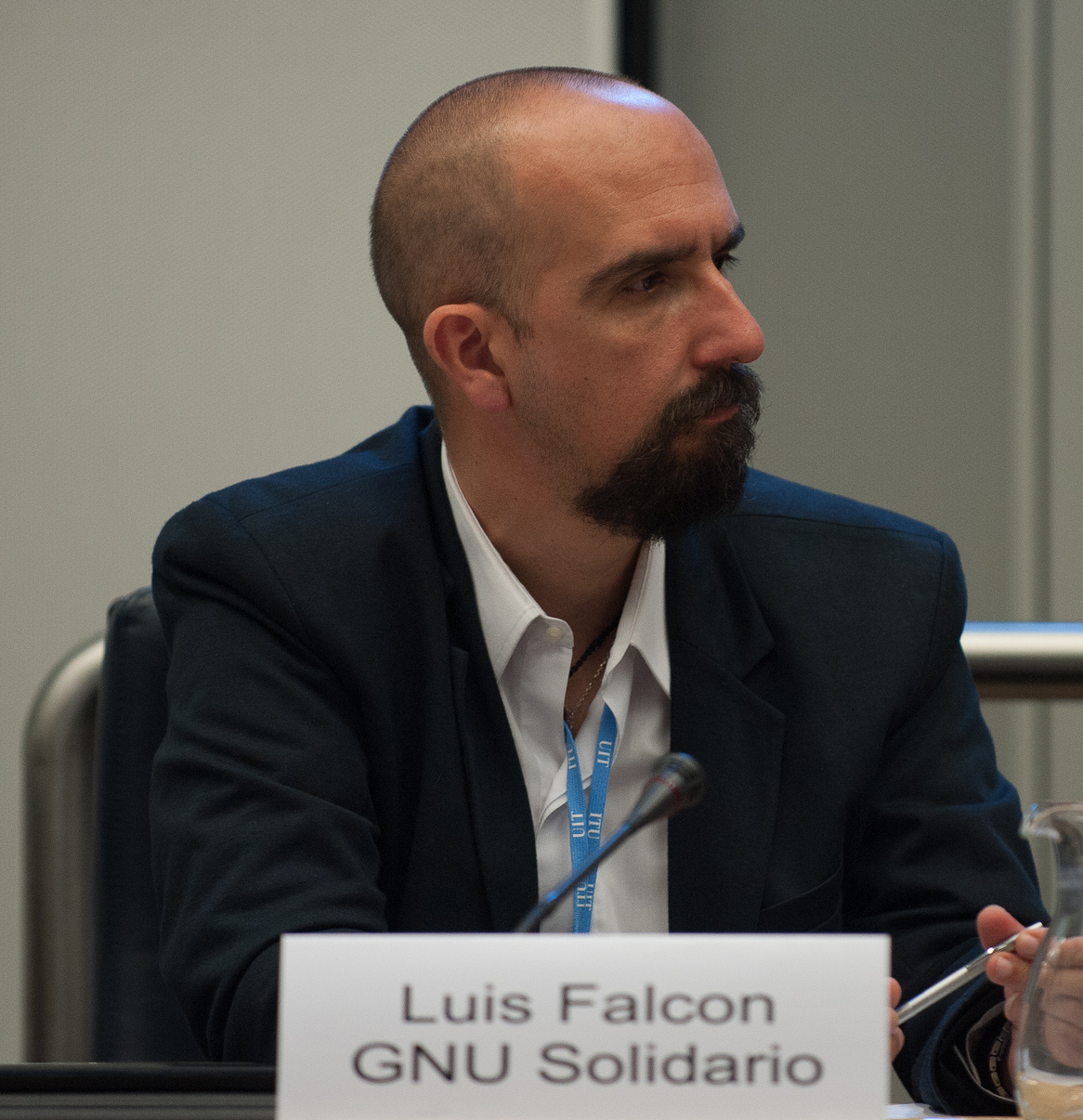
- Luis Falcon at the World Summit on the Information Society Forum in Geneva, May 2013
- Born: 3 September 1970 (age 55); Las Palmas, Spain
- Education: California State University, Northridge
- Occupations: Computer scientist, Physician
- Known for: GNU Solidario, GNU Health

Luis Falcón Martín is a Spanish computer scientist, physician and free software activist who founded GNU Solidario, an organization focused in education and health. Martín is known for in social medicine and as the author of GNU Health, a health and hospital information management system.

== Biography ==
Luis Falcón was born in Las Palmas de Gran Canaria, Spain, in 1970. He graduated from California State University, Northridge in 1996 with a degree in computer science, and from Instituto Universitario de Ciencias de la Salud medical school in Argentina. In 2009, he founded GNU Solidario, a non-profit organization that focuses on health and education with free software.

== GNU Solidario ==
Falcon defends the adoption of free software in the public administration. GNU Solidario, the organization that he founded in 2009, works for the universality of public health and education.

In his speech "Free Software as a Catalyst for Liberation, Social Justice and Social Medicine," he defines free software as a movement, as a philosophy, and as a way of activism. To him, the use of proprietary software in the public administration is a contradiction by definition.

=== Public education ===
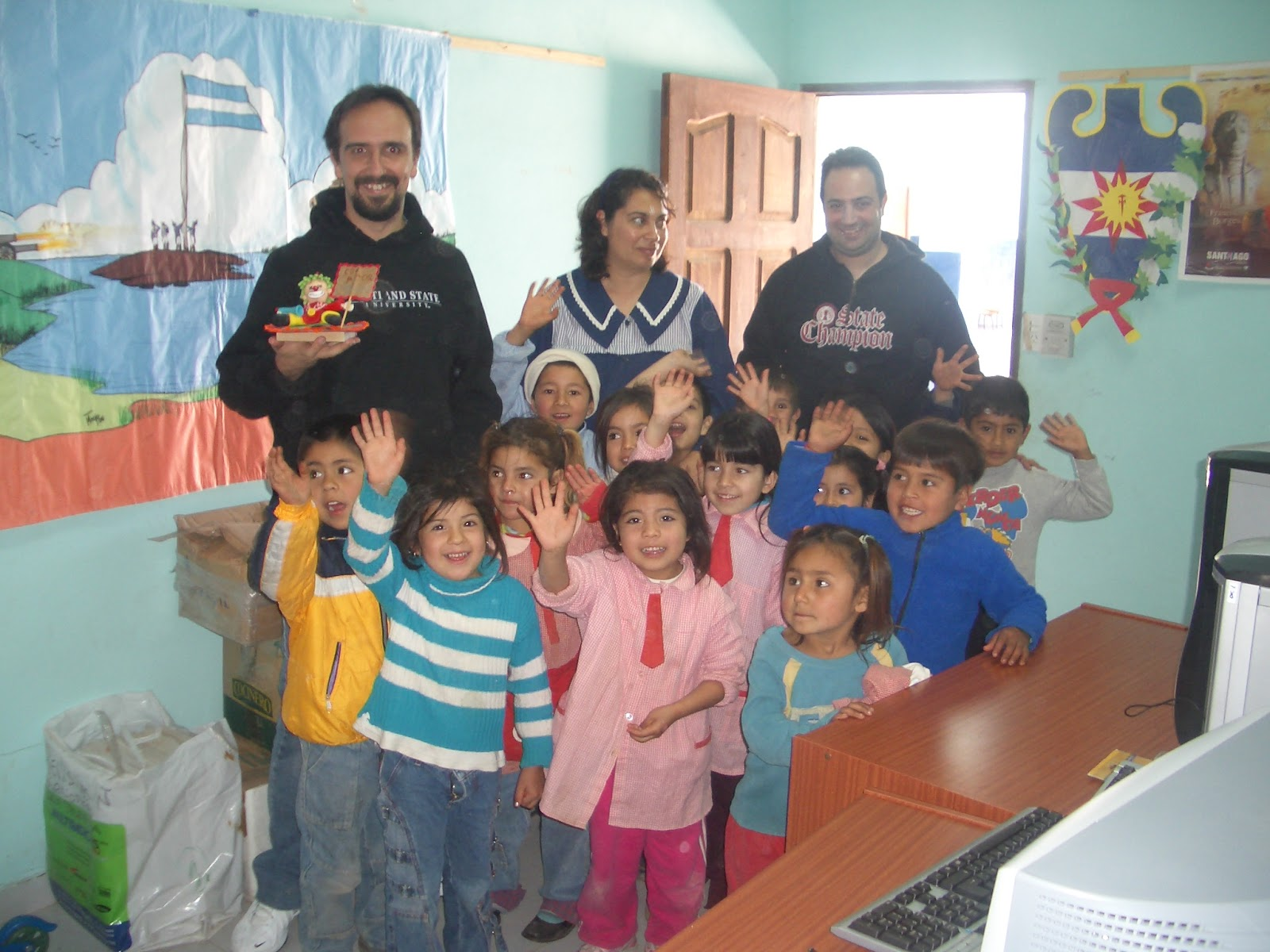
Luis Falcon in Santiago del Estero school 2006

The initial projects that Luis Falcon started were related to public education.

After observing the reality of many of the children on these schools, he incorporated social medicine into the project, to improve the socio-economic determinants of health on the communities. He conceives education and health as the basis for development and dignity of societies.

In an interview to the International Journal of Applied Ethics (Dilemata), Luis Falcon declared:

The project starts in 2006, visiting a rural school in Santiago del Estero, Argentina. Initially our mission was to install GNU/Linux in rural schools, but I noticed that these children needed shoes and nutrition before computers.

That made me think about how to help health professionals and social workers to improve the quality of life of people living in rural areas and socially underprivileged.

=== IWEEE ===
In 2010, Falcon organized the first International Workshop on eHealth in Emerging Economies (IWEEE) in an effort to congregate different organizations "to share their experiences and to try to find ways to improve the lives of millions of human beings from the developing world." IWEEE is a non-technical conference, where academic institutions, humanitarian organizations and social collectives get together to present and debate about social issues, Medicine and eHealth.

Since its first event in 2010, IWEEE has hosted humanitarian, multilateral organizations, such as United Nations Development Programme, Red Cross, War Child, World Health Organization, Médecins Sans Frontières, United Nations University International Institute for Global Health, or Caritas Internationalis, as well as research institutions, like the European Bioinformatics Institute and universities.

=== Public health and social medicine ===
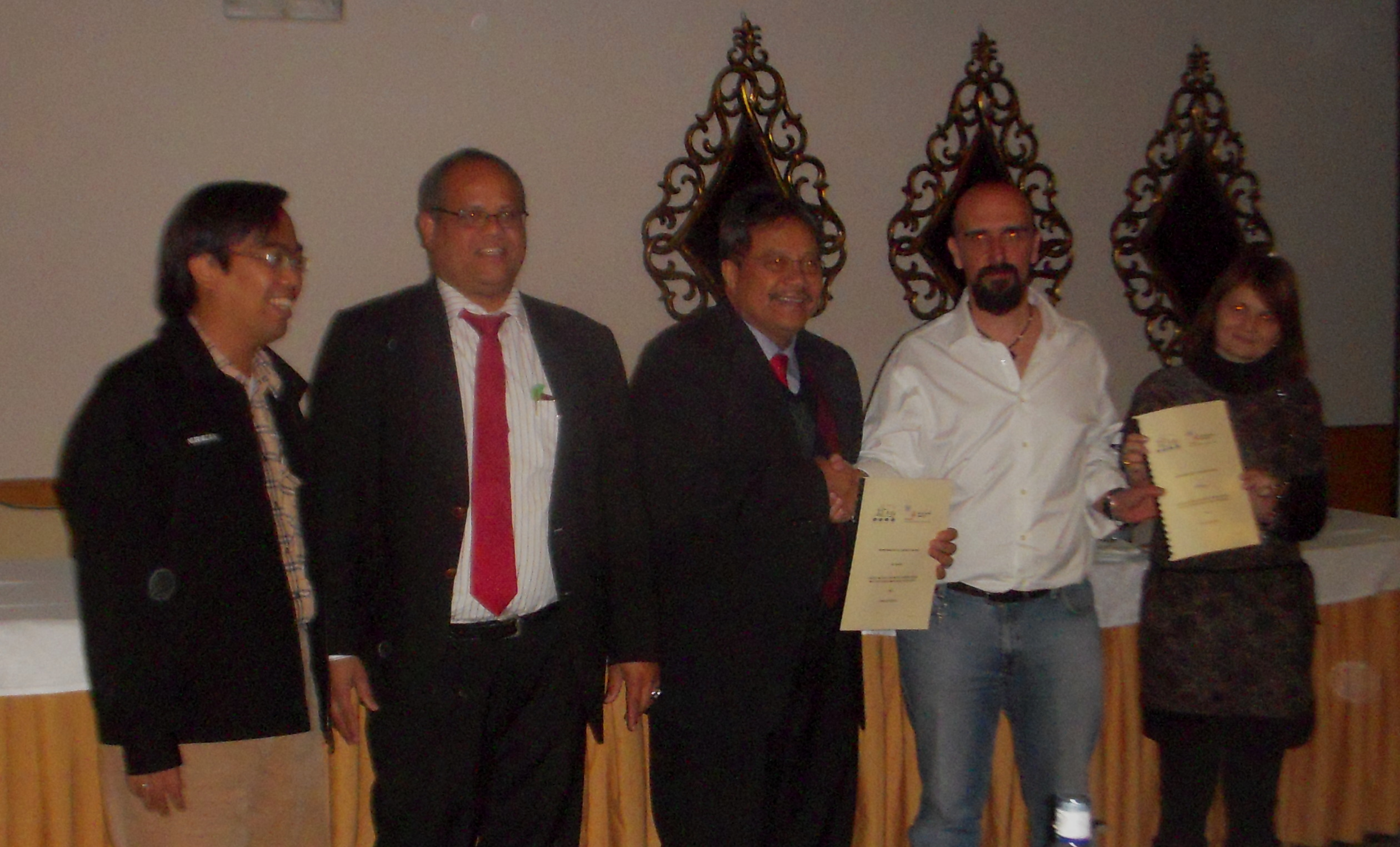
Luis Falcon and Mohamed Salleh at the ceremony after signing the agreement between United Nations University International Institute for Global Health and GNU Solidario

Falcón defends the public health model, and universality of healthcare. He conceives health as a "non-negotiable human right". He believes in the adoption of free software in the public sector. In one interview, Falcón said, "I encourage people to ask their politicians to adopt free software in the healthcare sector, because health is a public good, and thus all health information systems should be based on free software. Public health and proprietary software are antagonistic".

He follows the idea of Rudolf Virchow, about the concept of medicine being a social science. Falcon coins Virchow's aphorism, "Medicine is a social science, and politics is nothing else but medicine on a large scale".

=== GNU Health ===
Following his experience in rural and underprivileged areas in South America, Falcón started working on ways that free software could help health professionals and authorities to improve the public health system. Those ideas and reflections led him to create GNU Health.

Luis Falcón defines GNU Health as a "social project with some technology behind".

GNU Health was the first free software project that clearly focused on public health and social medicine. On November 11, 2011, Falcón signed an agreement to deploy GNU Health Hospital and Information System globally, particularly in developing countries.

In 2012, the Ministry of Health of Jamaica decided to adopt and customize GNU Health as their national health electronic record. As they mentioned in the National Health Information System Strengthening and e-Health Strategic Plan 2014-2018 document, the goal is to "implement, on a phased basis, GNU Health Free and Open Source Software (FOSS) as the new national electronic Patient Administration System (ePAS) for public hospitals and health centres".

Falcón believes that the university must be a key player in not only teaching health informatics and social medicine to their students, but as a crucial actor in reaching out to the community and spreading the value of free software in public administration in general, and in public health in particular.

The United Nations University, International Institute for Global Health has conducted training for health professionals from different countries. The article cites that participants were mostly from the Ministry of Health of Malaysia and Indonesia, public and private hospitals, universities as well as non-governmental organizations. The University of Entre Ríos has been one of the early adopters of GNU Health, both in teaching health informatics with free software to students and health professionals, and in implementing the GNU Health in different health institutions in Argentina.

== Animal rights ==
Falcón is also an animal rights activist. In an interview in Ethical magazine, he said that "a society is sick when [it] enslaves, tortures and kills other species".

In his keynote speech in the 12th International Symposium in Open Collaboration, OpenSym 2016 in Berlin, he declared that the dairy and meat industry are not only inhumane and extremely cruel, but also unhealthy and negative for the environment.

In July 2020, Falcón was among a group of scientists and academics who co-signed an open letter to various international regulatory bodies to stop the use of animal models in medical research.

== Recognitions ==
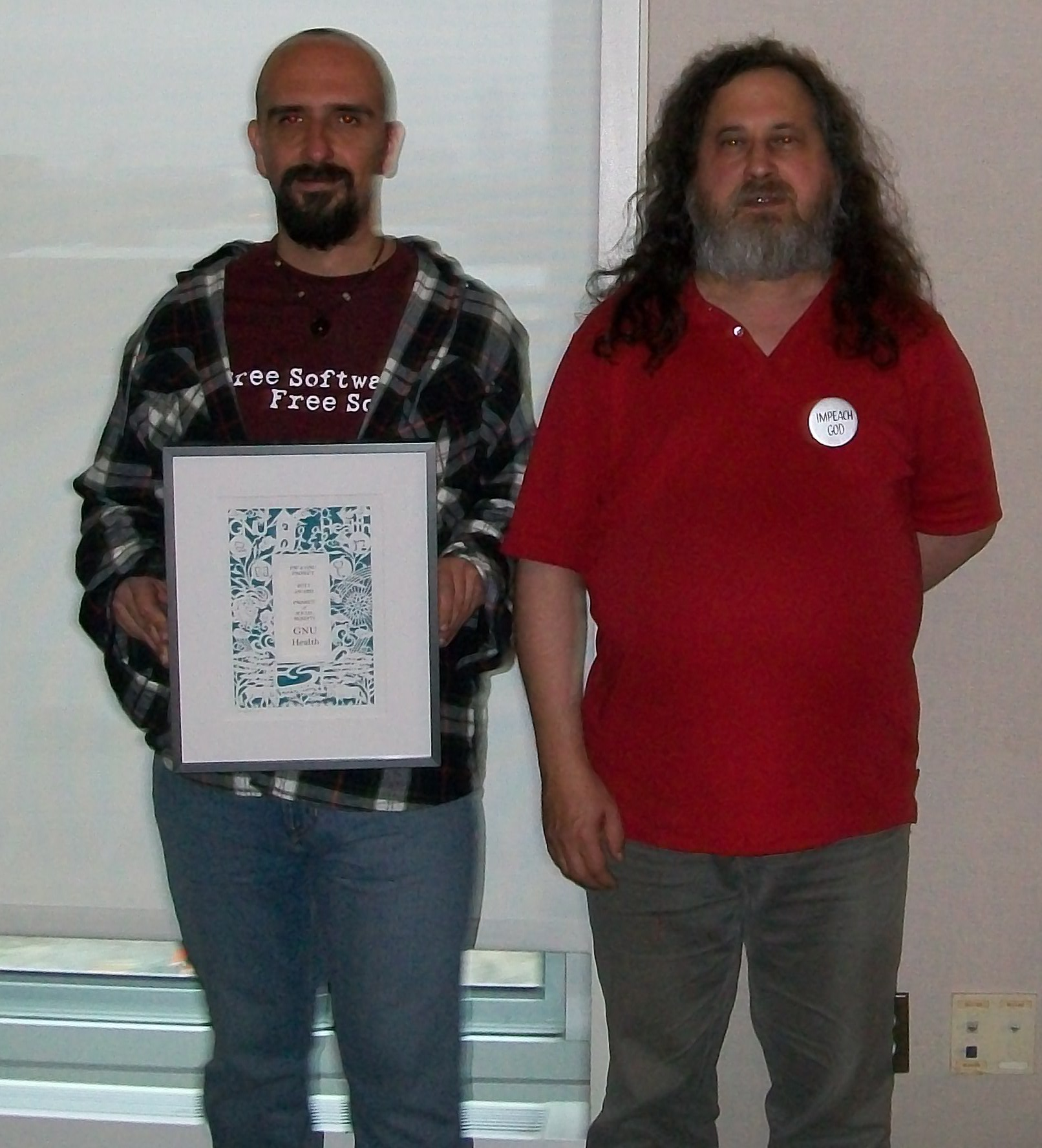
Falcon with Richard Stallman at Libreplanet 2012

- "One World One Family Humanitarian Award" in the field of Healthcare from OWOF Foundation, at Sathya Sai Grama, Muddenahalli, India during World Cultural Festival 2025
- Falcon received the 2011 Social benefit award for Best Project of Social Benefit from the Free Software Foundation for the GNU Health project at LibrePlanet 2012, at University of Massachusetts Boston
- Shuttleworth Foundation Grant 2015 for the work on GNU Health
- Sonderpreis Open Source Business Award (OSBAR) 2016 for GNU Health
- Open Awards 2019 special recognition award for Open Source in Medicine and Science
