= GNU Solidario =

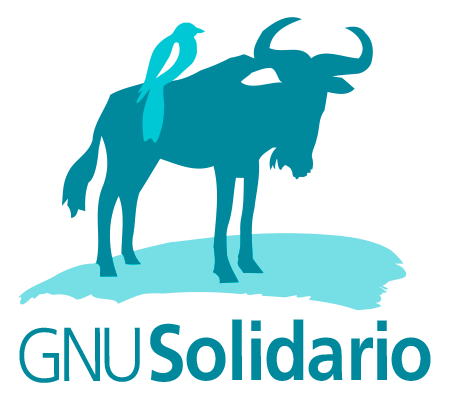
- Formation: November 23, 2009; 16 years ago
- Type: non-profit organization
- Legal status: Foundation
- Headquarters: Las Palmas de Gran Canaria, Canary Islands, Spain
- Region served: Worldwide
- Members: Private individuals and corporate patrons
- President: Luis Falcón
- Website: www.gnusolidario.org

GNU Solidario is a non-profit organization that was founded by Luis Falcón on 23 November 2009 to promote the use of Free Software in the context of public health and education. Currently it is focused on social medicine and animal rights.

== History ==
GNU Solidario's origins are in Argentina, with Free Software projects in the area of education in rural schools. The first mission was on 6 October 2006, in schools from Santiago del Estero. The project at that time was called Linux Solidario.

That event led Luis Falcón to focus on social medicine and public health, and work with professionals and governments to improve the lives of the underprivileged. In October 2009, the organization was officially registered in Las Palmas de Gran Canaria, Spain, where it currently holds its headquarters.

In 2010, GNU Solidario celebrates the first edition of the International Workshop on eHealth in Emerging Economies - IWEEE -. Since then, IWEEE has been a meeting point for multilateral and humanitarian organizations such as Red Cross, World Health Organization, Médecins Sans Frontières, War Child, United Nations University or Caritas Internationalis, as well as for universities around the world.

== Current projects and activities ==
=== International Workshop on eHealth in Emerging Economies ===
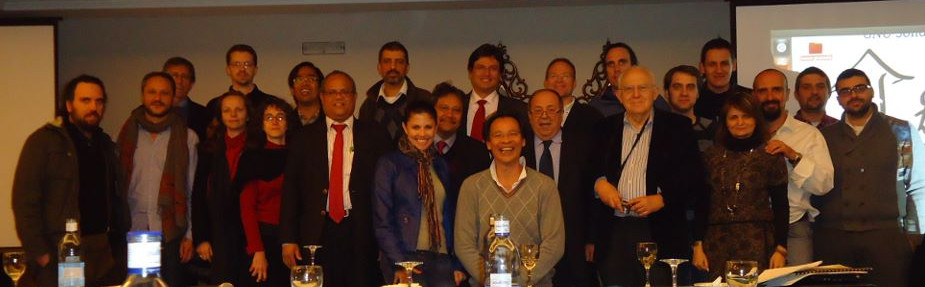
IWEEE 2012, Granada

IWEEE, the International Workshop on e-Health in Emerging Economies, is an annual conference for Free Software in the fields of Healthcare and Social Medicine. The workshop promotes Free Software as an effective and ethical solution to provide universality and equity in healthcare.

The International Workshop on e-Health in Emerging Economies is a stand-alone conference, that sometimes is held in the context of other events. In 2010 and 2011, the event was biannual. Since 2012, it has become an annual conference.

| Year / Link | Place | Context |
|---|---|---|
| 2010 | Las Palmas de Gran Canaria, Spain | IWEEE |
| 2010 | Foz do Iguaçu, Brazil | Latinoware |
| 2011 | Luxembourg City, Luxembourg | Medetel |
| 2011 | Foz do Iguaçu, Brazil | Latinoware |
| 2012 | Granada, Spain | IWEEE |
| 2013 | Las Palmas de Gran Canaria, Spain | IWEEE |
| 2014 | Las Palmas de Gran Canaria, Spain | IWEEE |
| 2015 | Las Palmas de Gran Canaria, Spain | IWEEE |
| 2016 | Las Palmas de Gran Canaria, Spain | GNUHealthCon |
| 2017 | Las Palmas de Gran Canaria, Spain | GNUHealthCon |
| 2018 | Las Palmas de Gran Canaria, Spain | GNUHealthCon |
| 2019 | Liège, Belgium | GNUHealthCon / OrthanCon |
| 2020 | Online conference | GNUHealthCon |
| 2021 | Online conference | GNUHealthCon |
| 2022 | Las Palmas de Gran Canaria, Spain | GNUHealthCon / OrthanCon |
| 2023 | Hanover, Germany | GNUHealthCon / OrthanCon |
| 2024 | Palermo, Italy | GNUHealthCon |
| 2025 | Las Palmas, Spain + Online Conference | GNUHealthCon |

=== GNUHealthCon ===
GNUHealthCon is an annual 2-day conference that brings together enthusiasts and developers of the Free/Libre Health & Hospital Information System, holding thematic sessions and free workshops.

=== Social Medicine Awards ===
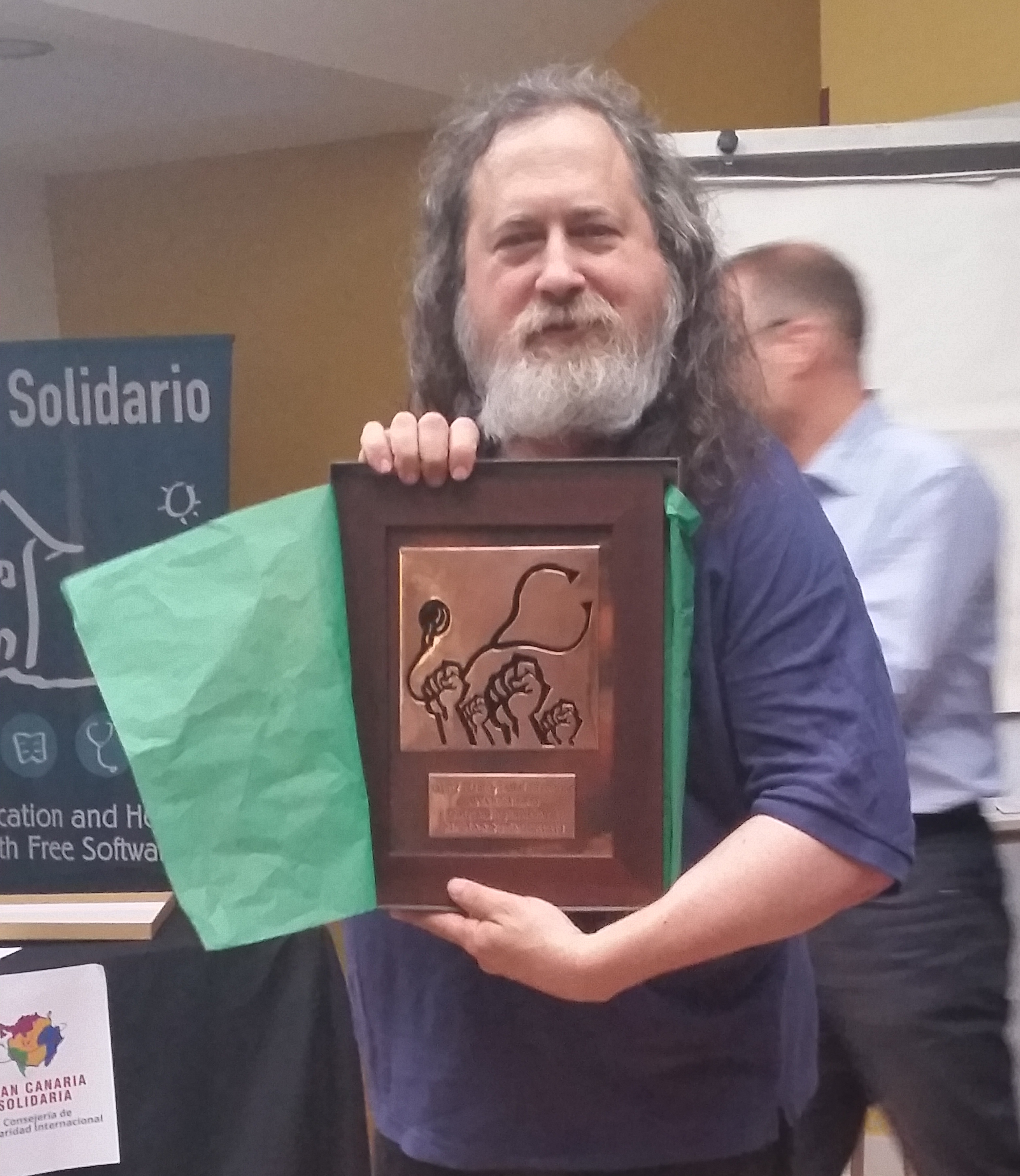
Richard Stallman receiving Social Medicine Award from GNU Solidario

The Social Medicine awards ceremony is part of GNUHealthCon, organized by GNU Solidario. The awards recognize the role of individuals and organizations committed to improving the lives of the underprivileged. There are three categories: Individual, Organization and GNU Health implementation.

GNU Health Social Medicine Awards:

| Year | Individual | Organization | GNU Health Implementation |
|---|---|---|---|
| 2016 | Richard Stallman | Red Cross | Laos Center of Medical Rehabilitation (CMR) |
| 2017 | Lorena Enebral | National University of Entre Ríos | Bikop Medical Center |
| 2018 | Jose Caminero Luna | Tor Project | Bafia District Hospital |
| 2019 | Aaron Swartz | Animal Free Research UK | Jamaica Ministry of Health |
| 2020 | Angela Davis | Proactiva Open Arms | Municipality of Diamante, Argentina |
| 2021 | Luna Reyes Segura | Physicians Committee for Responsible Medicine | Insolàfrica |
| 2022 | Teresita Guadalupe Calzia | Franz Weber Foundation | Cirugía Solidaria |
| 2023 | Sébastien Jodogne | Leibniz University Hannover | Fundación Jérôme Lejeune Argentina |
| 2024 | Alexandra Elbakyan | Sea-Eye | Centre Médico Familial et Communautaire (CEMEFCO), Haiti |
| 2025 | Francesca Albanese | Tryton Foundation | UNITEC - CIS El Níspero - Honduras |

=== GNU Health ===
GNU Health is a free software hospital information system with strong focus on public health and social medicine. Its functionality includes management of electronic health records and laboratory information management system functionality.

GNU Health has been adopted by the United Nations University. In 2011, it became a GNU official package. It was awarded Best Project of Social Benefit from the Free Software Foundation at LibrePlanet 2012, at University of Massachusetts Boston.

== See also ==
- GNU Project
- GNU Health
