= Cefora =

CEFORA (Spanish: Comisión de Estudio del Fenómeno OVNI República Argentina, Argentinean Republic Committee for UFO Phenomena Studies) is an organization formed by various ufology groups in Argentina. The main purpose is the declassification of all related UFO phenomena in Argentina. It was formed by serious Argentinean ufologists in Victoria, Entre Ríos during a conference.

== Background ==
CEFORA is the umbrella org for UFO groups and researchers in Argentina. The organization has requested heads of the National Ministry of Defense, the National Presidency and the Chamber of Deputies that they declassify all info in relation to UFO activity in Argentina. The director of the organization is Silvia Pérez Simondini. Simondini also runs the Visión OVNI UFO Museum which is in the Entre Ríos city of Victoria.

== See also ==
- Visión Ovni
