= GNU Health =

Free hospital, social medicine and laboratory informatics software

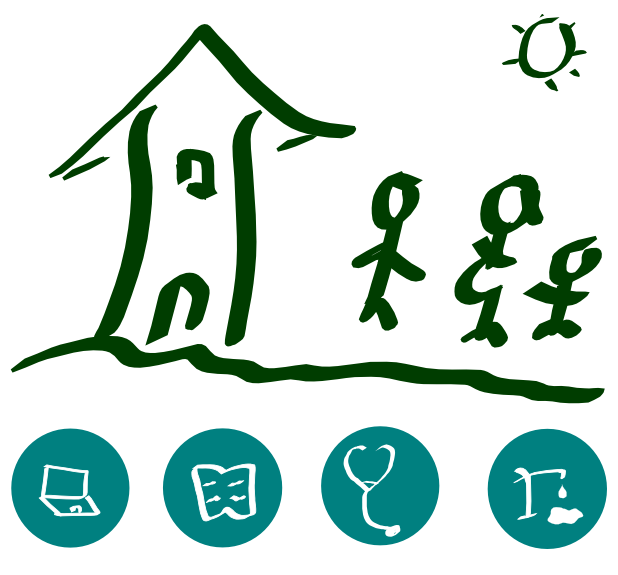

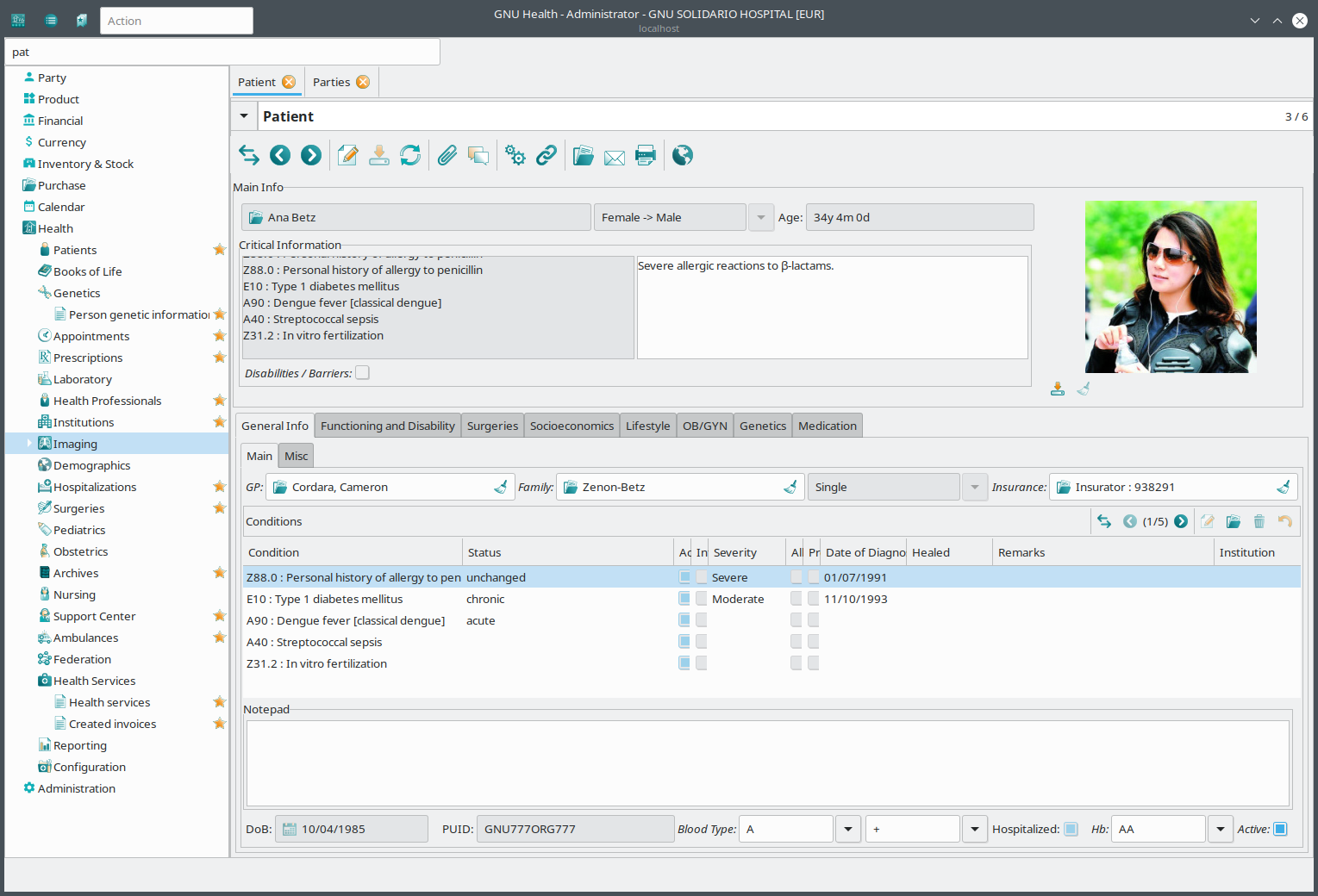
- GNU Health patient main screen on Tryton
- Original author: Luis Falcón
- Developer: GNU Project
- Release: 12 October 2008; 17 years ago
- Stable release: 5.0.7 / 12 April 2026
- Written in: Python, Tryton framework
- Operating system: Cross-platform
- Type: Hospital Information System
- License: GPL-3.0-or-later
- Website: www.gnuhealth.org
- Repository: codeberg.org/gnuhealth

GNU Health is a free/libre health and hospital information system with strong focus on public health and social medicine. Its functionality includes management of electronic health records and laboratory information management system.

It is designed to be multi-platform, supporting Linux distributions and FreeBSD on the server side. It uses PostgreSQL as its database engine. It is written in Python and uses the Tryton framework as one of its components.

GNU Health has been adopted by the United Nations University. In 2011, it became a GNU official package. It was awarded Best Project of Social Benefit from the Free Software Foundation at LibrePlanet 2012, at University of Massachusetts Boston.

GNU Health is a project of GNU Solidario, a non-profit non-governmental organization (NGO) that works in the areas of health and education with free software.

== History ==
GNU Health started in 2008 by Luis Falcón as a project for health promotion and disease prevention in rural areas. Its initial name was Medical. It has since evolved into a hospital information system, with a multi-disciplinary international team of contributors.

In August 2011, Richard Stallman declared GNU Health an official GNU Package. Following this, development was moved from SourceForge to GNU Savannah.

== Usage ==
GNU Health is intended for health institutions and governments, with functionality to take care of the daily clinical practice, manage resources, and to improve public health.

== Features ==
GNU Health uses a modular approach around the kernel, with different functionality that can be included to meet the health center's needs. Some of the main packages are:

Package	Functionality
Health	Core package. Includes demographics, patients, evaluations, health centers, appointments, vaccinations, medicaments, health conditions, health professionals and other core models and functionality.
Accounting	Functionality for bookkeeping: Chart of Accounts, General Ledger, Invoice handling, cash journals etc.
Pediatrics	Main package for pediatrics (including neonatal information and pediatric psychosocial assessments).
Pediatric Growth Charts	Includes World Health Organization percentile and z-scores charts.
Gynecology and Obstetrics	Gynecology, obstetrics, perinatal and puerperium assessment and history.
Lifestyle	Physical exercise, diets, drug addictions, National Institute of Drug Abuse (NIDA) recreational drug database, Henningfield ratings, sexuality, risk factors, home safety, child safety.
Genetics	Person genetic information and family history. Includes 4200+ "disease genes" from the NCBI/GeneCards.
Genetics Uniprot	UniProt database on human protein natural variants and phenotypes.
Lab	Laboratory information management system functionality.
Socioeconomics	Assessment and history of education, occupation, living conditions, hostile areas, child labor and prostitution, among others.
Inpatient	Hospitalization, bed, operating room management. Inpatient care and nursing plans.
Surgery	Pre-operation checklist, procedures, operating rooms, patient surgery history.
Services	Groups health related services for the patient. It also allows generating invoices and billing the selected services.
Calendar	CalDAV and WebDAV server. Manages appointments, hospitalizations, bed and other resources.
QR Codes	Includes QR codes for identification on persons, patients and lab orders.
History	Reports for patient demographics and medical history. Electronic Health Record EHR
MDG6	Millennium Development Goal 6: Functionality to fight malaria, tuberculosis and HIV/AIDS.
Reporting	Demographic, epidemiological and health center related information.
Nursing	Nursing functionality. Patient roundings, medication administration and procedures.
ICU	Basic intensive-care unit assessment, history and patient management.
Stock	Pharmacy and locations stock management. Automatic stock moves generation on medical procedures.
NTD	Base module to cover neglected tropical diseases.
NTD Chagas	NTD submodule for vector control, diagnosis, and management of chagas disease.
NTD Dengue	NTD submodule for vector control, diagnosis, and management of dengue fever.
Imaging	Diagnostic Imaging orders management functionality.
Orthanc	Module for integration with Orthanc PACS Server
Federation	Integration with the GNU Health Federation
Crypto	Support for document digest/record integrity check with hash functions; digital signatures and GNU Privacy Guard plugin.
Archives	Functionality to track legacy or paper-based patient health records.
Ophthalmology	Basic ophthalmology and optometry functionality.
Functioning and Disability	Based on WHO International Classification of Functioning, Disability and Health and Laos Center of Medical Rehabilitation.
ICD9 Vol 3	WHO ICD-9-CM Volume 3 procedure codes.
ICD10	WHO ICD-10 International Classification of Diseases - 10th revision
ICD11	WHO ICD-11 International Classification of Diseases - 11th revision
ICPM	WHO International Classification of Procedures in Medicine.
ICD10 PCS	Procedure Coding System extension
Insurance	Insurance and pricelists on services and products management.
EMS	Ambulance and Emergency Management System.
Contact tracing	Assessment, identification and followup of people who may have come into contact with an infected individual.

== Reception ==
- GNU Health was presented at World Health Organization session "ICT for Improving Information and Accountability for Women’s and Children's Health" in WSIS Forum 2013.
- GNU Health was awarded the Free Software Foundation's 2011 Award for Projects of Social Benefit.
- GNU Health won the awards PortalProgramas 2012, 2014 and 2015 for Most Revolutionary Free Software and Software with Largest Potential of Growth in 2012.
- GNU Health awarded Sonderpreis at Open Source Business Award 2016
- In April 2022, GNU Health was included in the Digital public goods registry

== Project milestones ==
- 12 October 2008: Medical project registered at SourceForge
- 2 November 2008: Medical Version 0.0.2 is released at SourceForge
- 15 April 2010: Medical is registered at Brazilian government Portal do Software Público Brasileiro (SPB)
- 31 July 2010: The Project is registered at the European Community Open Source Observatory and Repository
- 16 April 2011: Thymbra transfers GNU Health to the NGO GNU Solidario
- 18 April 2011: Medical switches the development environment from OpenERP to the Tryton framework.
- 12 June 2011: The project is renamed from Medical to GNU Health.
- 16 August 2011: version 1.3.0 is released, supporting Tryton and PostgreSQL.
- 26 August 2011: Richard Stallman declares GNU Health an official GNU Package. At this point, the development portal is moved from SourceForge to GNU Savannah.
- 29 October 2011: Release of GNU Health v 1.4.1. This version is also included at the Python Package Index – PyPI as a set of Python modules.
- 25 June 2012: Creation of a public Internet GNU Health database test server in Amsterdam.
- 9 February 2013: Release of version 1.8.0, compatible with Tryton 2.6 and Android client
- 18 March 2013: Release of version 1.8.1, with Intensive Care Unit functionality
- 7 July 2013: Release of version 2.0.0. Compatible with Tryton 2.8, New modules for Neglected tropical diseases, starting with Chagas disease. New Demographics section and Domiciliary Units management; new server installer; improvements to the surgery module (ASA physical status classification system and Revised Cardiac Risk Index).
- 22 September 2013: Release of version 2.2.0 Dengue and Diagnostic Imaging Tests.
- 14 November 2013: Release of version 2.2.2 GNU Health Patchset.
- 27 January 2014: Release of version 2.4.0
- 22 March 2014: First release of the GNU Health Live CD with GNU Health 2.4 and Tryton-Server 3.0.x on openSUSE 13.1. The Live CD offers a ready-to-run system with actual GNU Health and the Demo Database pre-installed.
- 6 July 2014: Release of version 2.6.0. Adds hash functions for document verification; digital signatures and GPG integration.
- 1 February 2015: Release of version 2.8.0. Adds Tryton 3.4 compatibility, data aggregation and synchronization features for distributed environments, a Universal Person Unique Identifier (PUID) and Universal Unique Identifier (UUID) implementation, a HL7 FHIR server, birth and death certificates, and enhanced crypto features (GNU Privacy Guard integration).
- 11 January 2016: Release of version 3.0.0: Tryton 3.8 compatibility (including web client support); Person functionality and disability module, inspired in WHO International Classification of Functioning, Disability and Health; basic Ophthalmology and Optometry functionality, and WHO ICD9 CM Volume 3 procedural codes
- 2 July 2017: Release of 3.2 series. GNU Health HMIS packages are now written in Python 3. Enhanced genetic history and UniProt package on human protein related conditions; Emergency Management System; Insurance pricelist; Improved crypto modules on laboratory and services; GNU Health Federation and Thalamus initial development.
- 26 July 2017: With the release of openSUSE Leap 42.3, GNU Health 3.2 becomes part of the standard distribution. This goes in line with automated testing using openQA and an easy, script-based setup.
- 26 November 2018: GNU Health Federation. Version 3.4 for HMIS node
- 10 November 2019: Release of version 3.6 . Integration of a person events ("Pages of Life") with Thalamus and the GNU Health Federation Health Information system. Migration from Mongodb to PostgreSQL for the HIS component. Orthanc DICOM server integration. All components in the GNU Health ecosystem use Python3.
- 24 June 2021: MyGNUHealth personal health record released.
- 3 April 2022: GNU Health included in the digital public goods registry.
- 16 February 2023: PATH declares GNU Health a Global Good for health
- 24 December 2023: GNU Health Hospital Management 4.4 series released.
- 6 February 2024: MyGNUHealth 2.0.1 Personal Health Record released.
- 27 March 2024: Thalamus, the GNU Health Federation message and authentication server version 0.9.16 is out.
- 6 April 2024: MyGNUHealth, the GNU Health Personal Health Record 2.0.3 released.
- 21 June 2024: MyGNUHealth, the GNU Health Personal Health Record series 2.2 released.
- 2 July 2024: The documentation for MyGNUHealth, the GNU Health Personal Health Record has been updated to v2.2.0.
- 17 July 2024: MyGNUHealth 2.2.1 released.
- 1 August 2024: GNUHealth Hospital Management 4.4.1 released.
- 29 June 2025: GNU Health Hospital Management Information System 5.0 has been released.
- 3 August 2025: The new demo database for GNU Health Hospital Management System 5.0 including ICD-11.
- 5 August 2025: The "ready to run" GNU Health Hospital and Laboratory Information System server 5.0 VirtualBox image is now available to download.
- 24 October 2025: GNU Health Hospital Information System 5.0 now also available for Raspberry Pi OS.
- 15 December 2025: GNU Health GTK client 5.0.1 released.

== GNUHealthCon ==
GNUHealthCon is an annual conference organized by GNU Solidario. It provides the space for developers, implementers and community members to meet in person during three days. It includes sessions about social medicine, technical discussions, implementation cases and workshops.

== GNU Health Social Medicine awards ==
GNU Health Social Medicine awards ceremony is part of GNUHealthCon. The awards recognize the role of individuals and organizations committed to improve the lives of the underprivileged. There are three award categories: Individual, Organization and GNU Health Implementation.

GNU Health Social Medicine Awards

Year	Individual	Organization	GNU Health Implementation
2016	Richard Stallman	Red Cross	Laos Center of Medical Rehabilitation (CMR)
2017	Lorena Enebral	National University of Entre Ríos	Bikop Medical Center
2018	Jose Caminero Luna	Tor Project	Bafia District Hospital
2019	Aaron Swartz	Animal Free Research UK	Jamaica Ministry of Health
2020	Angela Davis	Proactiva Open Arms	Municipality of Diamante, Argentina
2021	Luna Reyes Segura	Physicians Committee for Responsible Medicine	Insolàfrica
2022	Teresita Guadalupe Calzia	Franz Weber Foundation	Cirugía Solidaria
2023	Sébastien Jodogne	Leibniz University Hannover	Fundación Jérôme Lejeune Argentina
2024	Alexandra Elbakyan	Sea-Eye	Centre Médico Familial et Communautaire (CEMEFCO), Haiti
2025	Francesca Albanese	Tryton Foundation	UNITEC - CIS El Níspero - Honduras

== See also ==
- GNU Solidario
- GNU Project

== Other news and articles ==
- Webpage of the Ministry of Health of Jamaica on Health Informatics
- Article in The Hindu: Cheaper Health Care with Free Software
- Article in El Paìs, 09 November 2017, Sanidad del siglo XXI en el Camerún rural
- Video: Luis Falcón speech about GNU Health at MIT Global Health Informatics to Improve Quality of Care course. February 2015
- Luis Falcón: Sin Salud Pública no hay Desarrollo. Article in La Provincia, 3 July 2013
- GNU Health en Hospitales Públicos. Ministerio de Salud de Entre Ríos
- ALPI es pionero en la informática médica de Argentina gracias a la implementación del Software Libre: GNU Health
- Article in El Mundo: Liberar la salud con "software"
- Article in Linux Magazine: Projects on the Move
- GNU Health at the United Nations University
- TechRepublic. 10 open source projects that could really use a donation
- GNU Health é software livre para uso na área de saúde.- Linux Magazine Brasil October 2011
- Software español para informatizar la sanidad en Camerún e India. March 2020
- Medical Campaign uses GNU Health, openSUSE October 2022
- Interview Dr Luis Falcon, GNU Health, free software in healthcare. November 2022
- GNU Health opts for REUSE. FSFE December 2022
- Un software para mejorar las políticas de salud. March 2023
- La Vicuña firma un convenio de colaboración en favor de la medicina social y el software libre. April 2023
- ADAV Weimar and GNU Solidario join forces in Telemedicine with GNU Health in Afghanistan May 2023
