= Gustavo Bordet =

Argentine politician (born 1962)

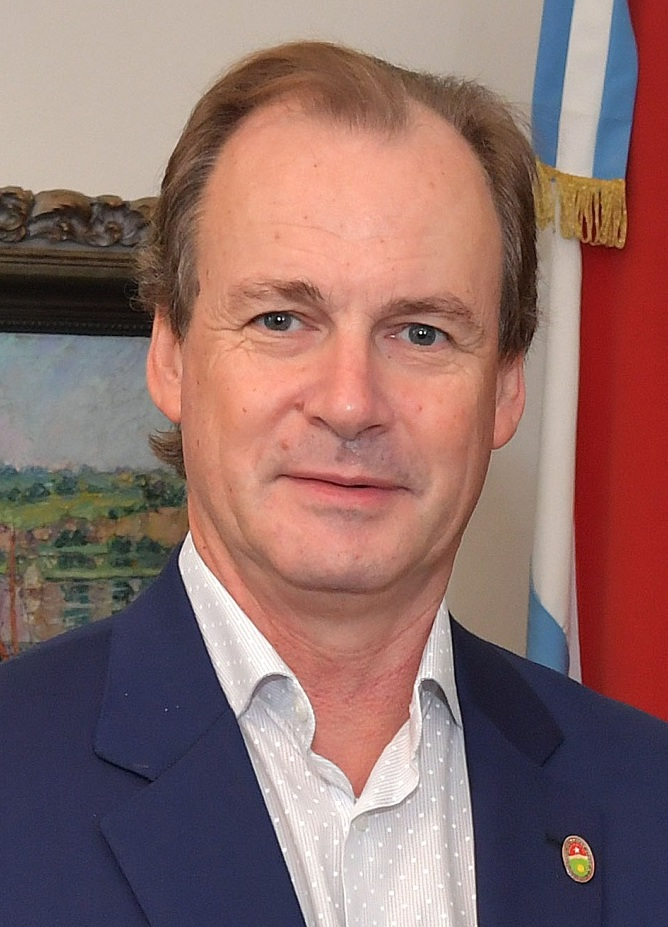
- Bordet in 2018

National Deputy
- Incumbent
- Assumed office 10 December 2023
- Constituency: Entre Ríos

Governor of Entre Ríos
- In office 10 December 2015 – 10 December 2023
- Vice Governor: Adán Bahl; María Laura Stratta
- Preceded by: Sergio Urribarri
- Succeeded by: Rogelio Frigerio

Mayor of Concordia
- In office 10 December 2007 – 10 December 2015
- Preceded by: Juan Carlos Cresto
- Succeeded by: Enrique Tomás Cresto

Personal details
- Born: February 21, 1962 (age 64) Concordia, Entre Ríos, Argentina
- Party: Justicialist Party
- Education: National University of Entre Ríos

Gustavo Bordet (born 21 February 1962) is an Argentine Justicialist Party politician. He served as mayor of Concordia, Entre Ríos from 2007 to 2015, and later as governor of Entre Ríos Province from 2015 to 2023.

Bordet was born in Concordia, Entre Ríos in 1962. He worked as a legislator of the city council. Governor Jorge Busti appointed him minister of health of the province in 2005, when Graciela López de Degani resigned because of a scandal. He was elected mayor of Concordia in 2007, and reelected in 2011. He was elected governor of Entre Ríos in 2015. His vice minister, Adán Bahl, was minister of the outgoing governor Sergio Urribarri.

Busti and Bordet are divided on the approach to the 2017 legislative elections. Busti had left the PJ and supports the Renewal Front. Bordet intends him to return to the PJ, considering that if Peronism does not unite under a single party it may be defeated by the Cambiemos political coalition. Although from a different political party, Bordet in good terms with president Mauricio Macri.

Preceded by Sergio Urribarri	Governor of Entre Ríos; 2015–2023	Succeeded by Rogelio Frigerio
