= Urribarri =

Urribarri is a surname. Notable people with the surname include:

- Bruno Urribarri (born 1986), Argentine footballer
- Sergio Urribarri (born 1958), Argentine politician
