= Argentina–India relations =

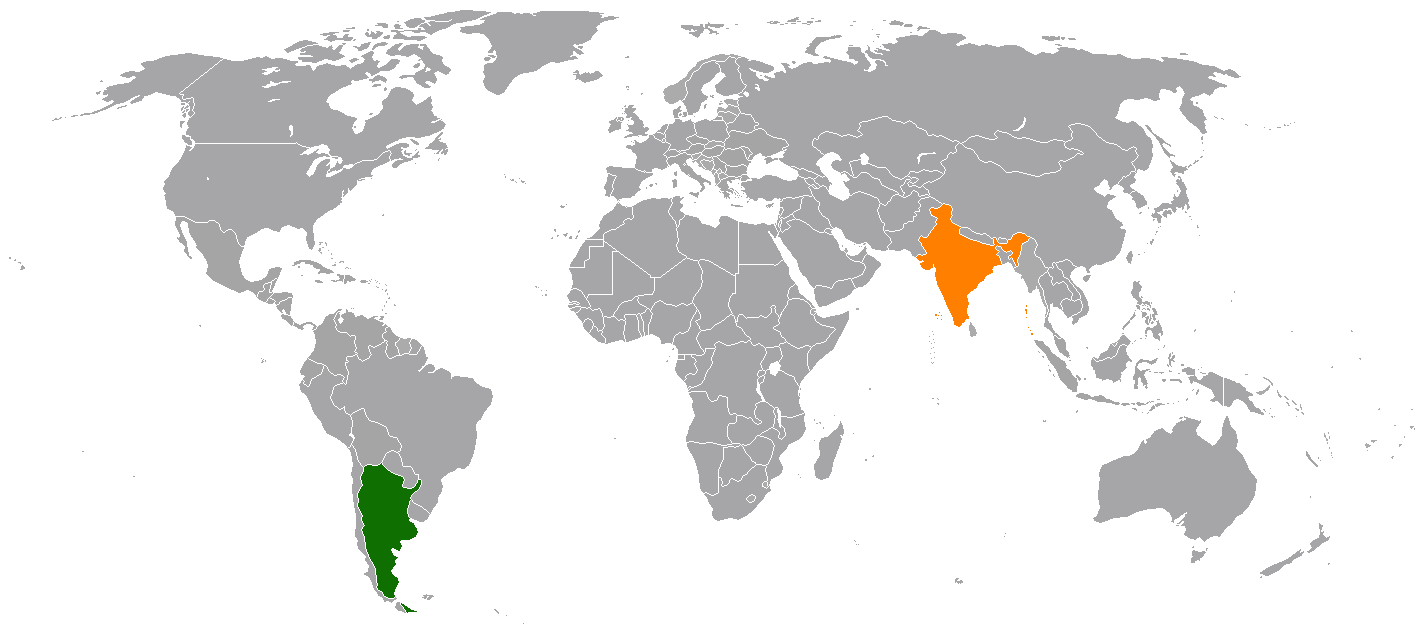
- Argentina: India

Diplomatic mission
- Embassy of Argentina, New Delhi: Embassy of India, Buenos Aires

Envoy
- Argentine Ambassador to India Mariano Caucino: Indian Ambassador to Argentina Ajaneesh Kumar

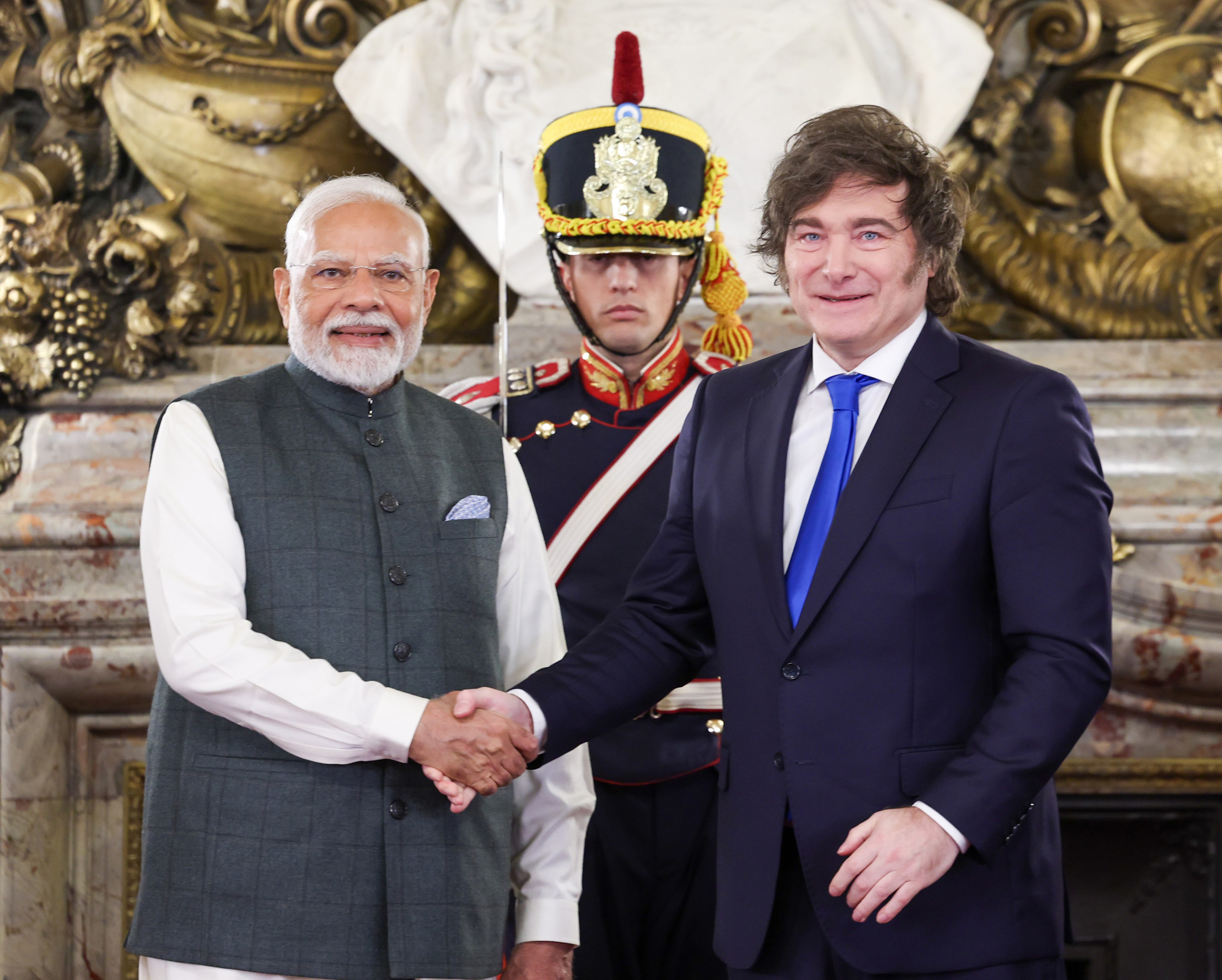
Prime Minister Narendra Modi holds talks with President Javier Milei in Buenos Aires, July 2025.

Bilateral relations between the Argentine Republic and the Republic of India, have existed for decades. Both countries are members of G20, Group of 24 and Group of 77.

== History ==
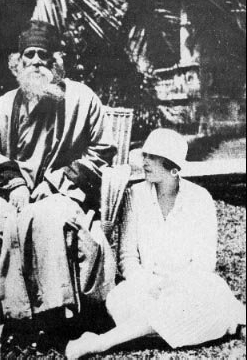
Rabindranath Tagore and Victoria Ocampo in 1924.

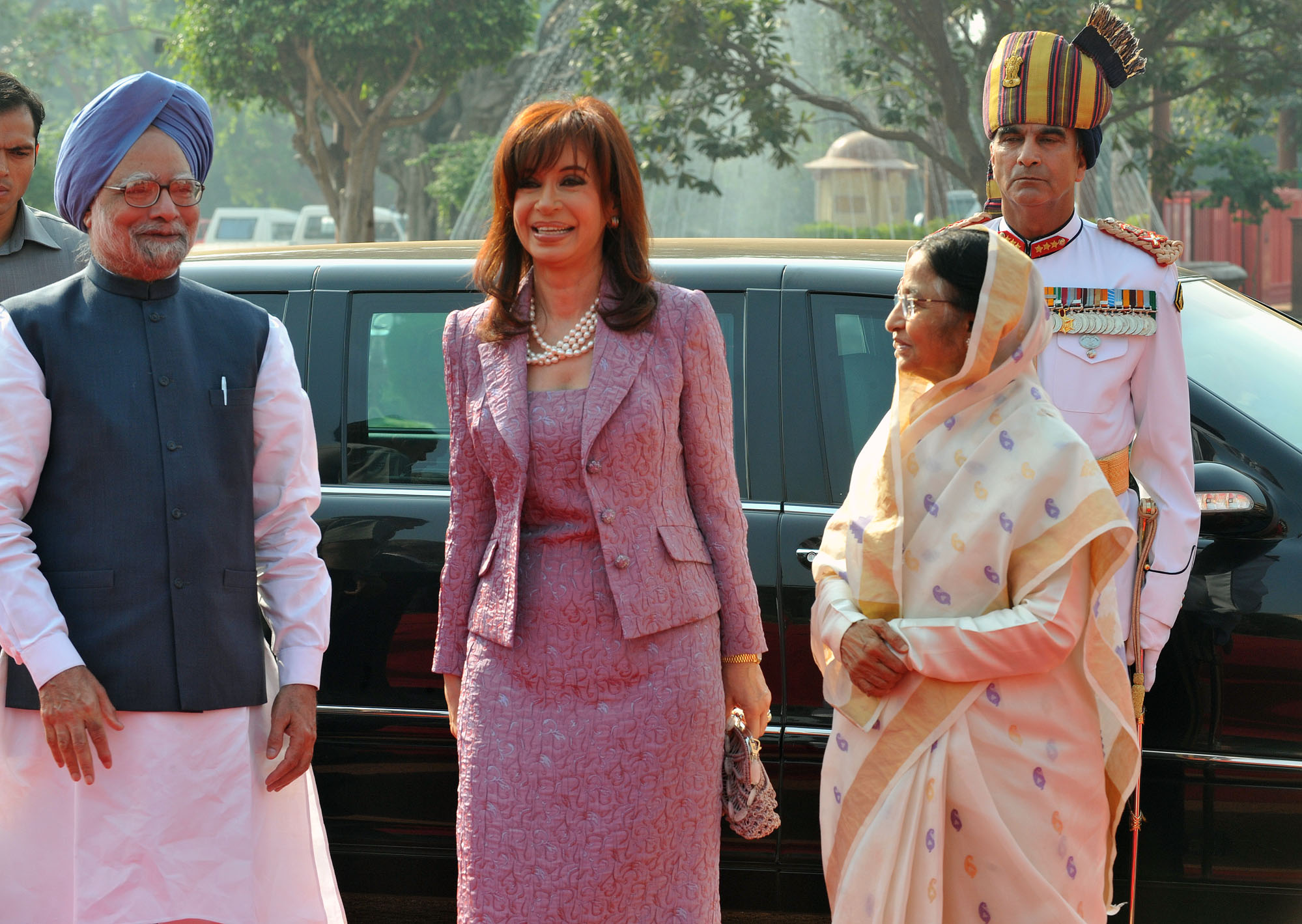
President Cristina Kirchner with Prime Minister Manmohan Singh and President Pratibha Patil.

Rabindranath Tagore visited Argentina in 1924. He stayed there for two months as the guest of Victoria Ocampo. Tagore wrote a series of poems under the title "Purabi" about his stay in Argentina. Victoria Ocampo was awarded an honorary doctorate by the Viswa Bharati University in 1968.

India opened a Trade Commission in Buenos Aires in 1943. This was converted into an embassy on 3 February 1949. Argentina had established a consulate in Calcutta in the 1920s. In 1950, it was transferred to Delhi as an embassy. Argentina opened a Consulate General in Mumbai in April 2009.

== High-level visits ==
High-level visits from Argentina to India

- President Arturo Frondizi (1961)
- President Reynaldo Bignone (1983)
- President Raúl Alfonsín (1985)
- President Carlos Menem (1994)
- President Cristina Fernández de Kirchner (2009)
- President Mauricio Macri (2019)
- President Alberto Fernández (2023)

High-level visits from India to Argentina

- Prime Minister Indira Gandhi (1968)
- President Zail Singh (1984)
- Prime Minister P. V. Narasimha Rao (1995)
- Prime Minister Narendra Modi (2018, 2025)

== Economic relations ==
Several India companies such as TCS, Wipro, CRISIL, Bajaj, Cellent, United Phosphorus Ltd (UPL), Synthesis Quimica, Glenmar and Godrej operate in Argentina. They employ 7000 Argentines as of 2013. ONGC signed a MoU with ENARSA for possible joint ventures in Argentina for oil exploration.

Argentine companies operating in India include IMPSA, Biosidus and BAGO.

Indian investment in the country totaled $930 million in 2013. Argentine investment in India totalled $120 million in 2013.Bilateral trade between India and Argentina grew from 2019 to 2022, reaching USD 6.4 billion in 2022. During this period, trade maintained a net surplus in favor of Argentina, with India ranking among the top five export destinations for Argentine goods.In 2024, Indian investment in the third quarter was US$613 million. In July 2026, bilateral trade between India and Argentina resulted in a trade deficit of $396 million for India, with Indian exports to Argentina totaling $102 million against imports from Argentina of $498 million. On a year-over-year basis compared to July 2025, Indian exports to Argentina contracted by 9.17% ($10.3 million) from $112 million to $102 million, whereas Indian imports from Argentina grew by 11.3% ($50.7 million) from $447 million to $498 million.

=== Trade ===
A preferential trade agreement between India and Mercosur (of which Argentina is a member) came into operation in 2009.

==== Bilateral trade ====
Bilateral trade between India and Argentina reached US$6.4 billion in 2022. In both 2021 and 2022, India emerged as Argentina's fourth-largest trading partner, with Argentina playing a vital role in supplying edible oils—especially soybean oil—to the Indian market. In 2023, bilateral trade was significantly impacted by Argentina's severe drought and a foreign exchange crisis, resulting in a sharp 39% decline, with total trade falling to US$3.9 billion.

==== Exports ====
Specific trading data for the most recent available dates:

==== Argentina Exports to India ====
Commodity	Value	Year
Animal, vegetable fats and oils, cleavage products	$3.26B	2024
Commodities not specified according to kind	$469.73M	2024
Pearls, precious stones, metals, coins	$129.84M	2024
Raw hides and skins (other than furskins) and leather	$34.34M	2024
Organic chemicals	$14.69M	2024
Miscellaneous chemical products	$10.15M	2024
Wood and articles of wood, wood charcoal	$8.41M	2024
Machinery, nuclear reactors, boilers	$4.02M	2024
Tanning, dyeing extracts, tannins, derivatives, pigments	$1.68M	2024
Optical, photo, technical, medical apparatus	$1.47M	2024
Edible vegetables and certain roots and tubers	$1.46M	2024
Coffee, tea, mate and spices	$594.33K	2024
Edible fruits, nuts, peel of citrus fruit, melons	$426.68K	2024
Electrical, electronic equipment	$357.55K	2024
Wool, animal hair, horsehair yarn and fabric	$317.73K	2024
Rubbers	$209.85K	2024
Pharmaceutical products	$115.14K	2024
Soaps, lubricants, waxes, candles, modelling pastes	$105.88K	2024
Articles of iron or steel	$80.23K	2024
Plastics	$75.78K	2024
Mineral fuels, oils, distillation products	$20.12M	2023
Inorganic chemicals, precious metal compound, isotope	$13.49M	2023
Vehicles other than railway, tramway	$3.27M	2023
Fish, crustaceans, molluscs, aquatics invertebrates	$2.23M	2023
Albuminoids, modified starches, glues, enzymes	$1.04M	2023
Vegetable, fruit, nut food preparations	$640.52K	2023
Residues, wastes of food industry, animal fodder	$596.90K	2023
Beverages, spirits and vinegar	$334.19K	2023
Cereals	$240.10K	2023
Oil seed, oleagic fruits, grain, seed, fruits	$226.33K	2023
Essential oils, perfumes, cosmetics, toileteries	$129.14K	2023
Tools, implements, cutlery of base metal	$24.19K	2023
Printed books, newspapers, pictures	$1.09K	2023
Copper	$561	2023
Salt, sulphur, earth, stone, plaster, lime and cement	$298.77K	2021
Iron and steel	$643.02K	2019
Paper and paperboard, articles of pulp, paper and board	$72.05K	2019

In January 2025, Argentina's YPF signed a memorandum with ONGC Videsh, GAIL, and OIL to export liquefied natural gas and collaborate on hydrocarbon exploration. In July of that year, Prime Minister Narendra Modi’s on a visit to President Javier Milei in Buenos Aires widened ties in defense, space, agriculture, and pharmaceuticals, while both sides strengthened institutional engagement through the Joint Working Group on Agriculture and discussions on expanding the MERCOSUR trade agreement.

== Science and education ==
In January 2007, ISRO launched Pehuensat-1, an Argentine nano-satellite on board PSLV. India and Argentina are both members of the Antarctic Treaty. An MoU for Antarctic co-operation was signed by the two countries in 1998 and renewed in 2006.

India provides five ITEC scholarships to Argentine candidates annually. Argentine diplomats have attended the courses at the Foreign Service Training Institute of India. The University of Buenos Aires conducts postgraduate courses in Ayurveda in collaboration with the Gujarat Ayurveda University. The Jawaharlal Nehru University signed an MoU for cooperation with San Luis University of Argentina.

== Cultural relations ==
=== Sports ===
The Indian Football Academy collaborated with Argentine football club River Plate for training and exchanges. Argentine football legend Diego Maradona visited India in October 2009. Several Argentine players play in the Indian Super League.

There is a huge fan following for Argentina's national football team in Indian states of Kerala and West Bengal.

The Don Torcuato based sports club Hindú Club traces its origin to Indian laborers, mainly from Bihar and Bengal, who were brought to South America for rubber plantation. Those immigrant workers were fundamental in founding the club in 1895.

=== Areas of Untapped Potential ===
Argentina and India both have established domestic film industries with substantial and diverse audiences. However, Argentine films generally reach Indian audiences primarily through film festivals and other limited channels. Similarly, India’s major film industries, including Bollywood, Tamil, Malayalam, and Bengali cinema, have had relatively limited exposure in Argentina. This suggests scope for greater engagement through cinema, including as a means of cultural and soft-power exchange. However, the potential of film as a channel for strengthening cultural relations between the two countries remains largely underdeveloped.

Similarly, there needs to be mutual promotion of tourism between the two countries. Both nations offer complementary attractions and experiences from a tourism perspective. Currently, the lack of direct flight connectivity between Latin America and South Asia poses a major roadblock to enhancing people-to-people interactions, travel, and tourism.

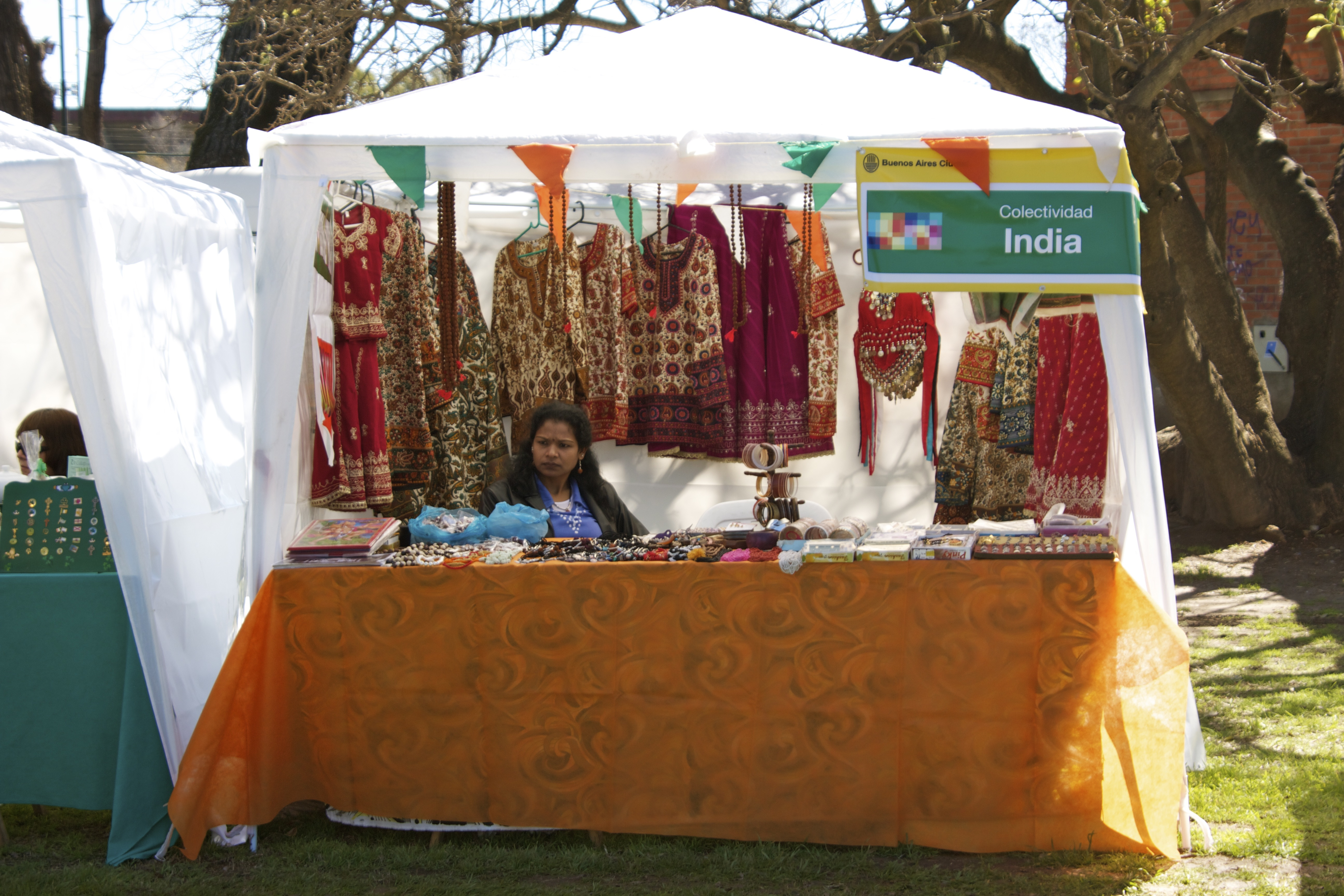
An Indian stall in Buenos Aires in 2010.

== Indian diaspora ==
As of 2013, about 200 Indian citizens (predominantly from the Sindhi community) reside in Buenos Aires, of which, half have lived there for over 30 years. Other Indian residents are employees of Indian and multinational corporations in Argentina. About 300 Punjabi Sikhs settled down in Salta province in the early and mid twentieth century. As of 2013, their current population numbers around 2000. They have become Argentine citizens and are mostly employed in retail and wholesale trade. There is a gurudwara in Rosario de la Frontera.

== Resident diplomatic missions ==
of Argentina in India

- New Delhi (Embassy)
- Mumbai (Consulate-General)

of India in Argentina

- Buenos Aires (Embassy)

== See also ==
- Foreign relations of Argentina
- Foreign relations of India
