= Mariano Caucino =

Argentine diplomat (born 1976)

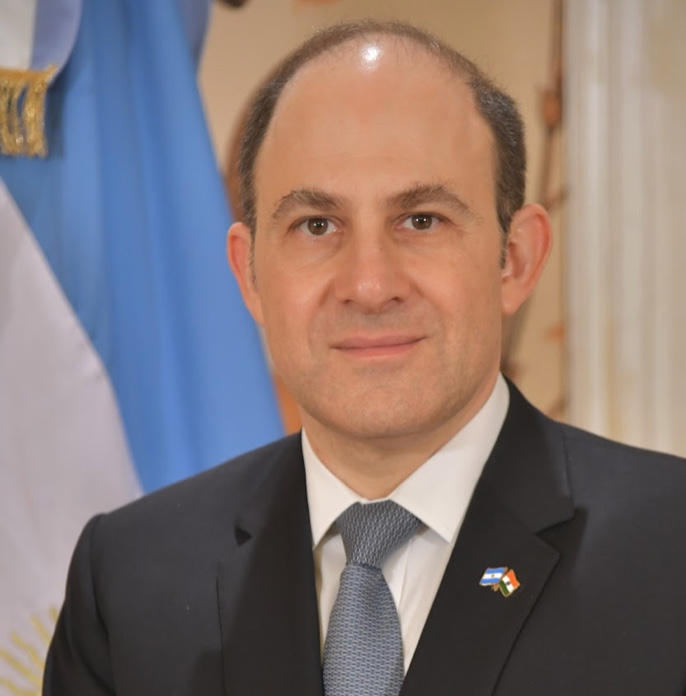
- Caucino in 2024

Ambassador of Argentina to India
- Incumbent
- Assumed office 2024
- President: Javier Milei
- Preceded by: Hugo Javier Gobbi

Ambassador of Argentina to Israel
- In office 2017–2019
- President: Mauricio Macri
- Preceded by: Carlos Faustino García
- Succeeded by: Sergio Urribarri

Ambassador of Argentina to Costa Rica
- In office 2016–2017
- President: Mauricio Macri

Personal details
- Born: September 14, 1976 Buenos Aires, Argentina
- Education: University of Buenos Aires

Mariano Agustín Caucino (Buenos Aires, September 14, 1976) is an Argentine lawyer, historian, and diplomat. He graduated as a lawyer from the University of Buenos Aires (2001) and has specialized in the study of international relations.

He served as ambassador of Argentina to Costa Rica (2016–2017) and to the State of Israel (2017–2019). In 2024, he was appointed as Ambassador of Argentina to India.

Previously, he was the founder and director of the School of Political Science and Government at the University of Business and Social Sciences (UCES) and a professor of Foreign Policy and Contemporary History.

Additionally, he is a regular columnist in public media in Argentina, Latin America, the US, and Israel on global affairs and international politics.

== Biography ==
He was born in Buenos Aires. He attended primary and secondary school at the Bayard Institute, in the Palermo neighborhood. Between 1996 and 2001, he studied law at the Faculty of Law of University of Buenos Aires. Although he had political inclinations and supported the pro-market reforms carried out in Argentina in the 1990s, he prioritized his university career over political activism. In December 2001, he obtained his law degree.

== Professional career ==
In 2002, he founded the Institute of Political Studies and later the School of Political Science and Government at the University of Business and Social Sciences.

During those years, Caucino joined the Argentine Council for International Relations (CARI), and between 2010 and 2012, he served as President of the Business Leaders Association.

Between 2005 and 2012, he was Director of International Relations at the University of Business and Social Sciences (UCES), a position from which he promoted student exchange programs between Argentine students and different countries worldwide, participating in educational fairs and conferences in Latin America, the US, Europe, and Asia.

At the suggestion of former Foreign Minister Adalberto Rodríguez Giavarini, Caucino was invited to join the Institute of International Politics at the National Academy of Moral and Political Sciences. Since 2016, he has been a member of the board of the InterAmerican Institute for Democracy (Miami, FL).

== Ambassador ==
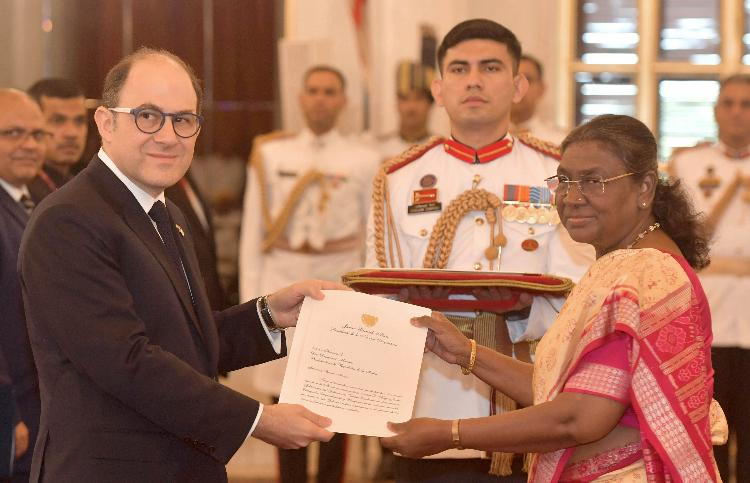
Ambassador Mariano Caucino presenting Letters of Credence to the President of India, Ms. Droupadi Murmu, July 11, 2024.

During President Mauricio Macri's government, he served as Ambassador of Argentina to Costa Rica (2016–17) and Ambassador to the State of Israel (2017–19) and concurrent ambassador to Cyprus (2018–19).

Caucino stated that his role in Israel was “in response to President Macri's policy of turning the page on the disastrous Memorandum with Iran signed at the end of the Kirchner government.”

In December 2023, he was appointed by Foreign Minister Diana Mondino as ambassador to India, becoming one of the few political ambassadors appointed by President Javier Milei's government. Caucino's appointment as ambassador was acknowledged by the newspaper La Nación.

In July 2024, he presented his letters of credence to the President of India, Droupadi Murmu, at the Presidential Palace in New Delhi. In the exercise of his diplomatic functions, Caucino assumed responsibility for the growing bilateral relationship between India and Argentina, which has been elevated to a comprehensive strategic partnership.

== Publications ==
- Argentina 1950-1980: an unstable country in the Cold War (Argentina 1950-1980: un país inestable en la Guerra Fría), Doble-Hache (2013).
- Argentina 1980-2010: chronology of three decades of our recent history (Argentina 1980-2010: cronología de tres décadas de nuestra historia reciente), Doble-Hache (2011).
- Russia, global actor: The rebirth of a giant and the concern of the West (Rusia, actor global: El renacer de un gigante y la inquietud de Occidente), El Economista (2015).
- Putin's Russia: Myth and reality of post-Soviet leadership (La Rusia de Putin: Mito y realidad del liderazgo post-soviético), Ediciones B (2016).
- Pendular Argentina: The costs of unpredictability and the opportunity for consensus (La Argentina pendular: Los costos de la imprevisión y la oportunidad del consenso), AMS Edit (2019).
- The Perón we overlook (El Perón que no miramos), Areté (2021).
- Frondizi, the misunderstood statesman (Frondizi el estadista incomprendido), Areté (2022).

He is a regular columnist on global affairs and frequently publishes on the Infobae website and maintains a blog on The Times of Israel.
