= Sergio Urribarri =

Argentine politician and diplomat

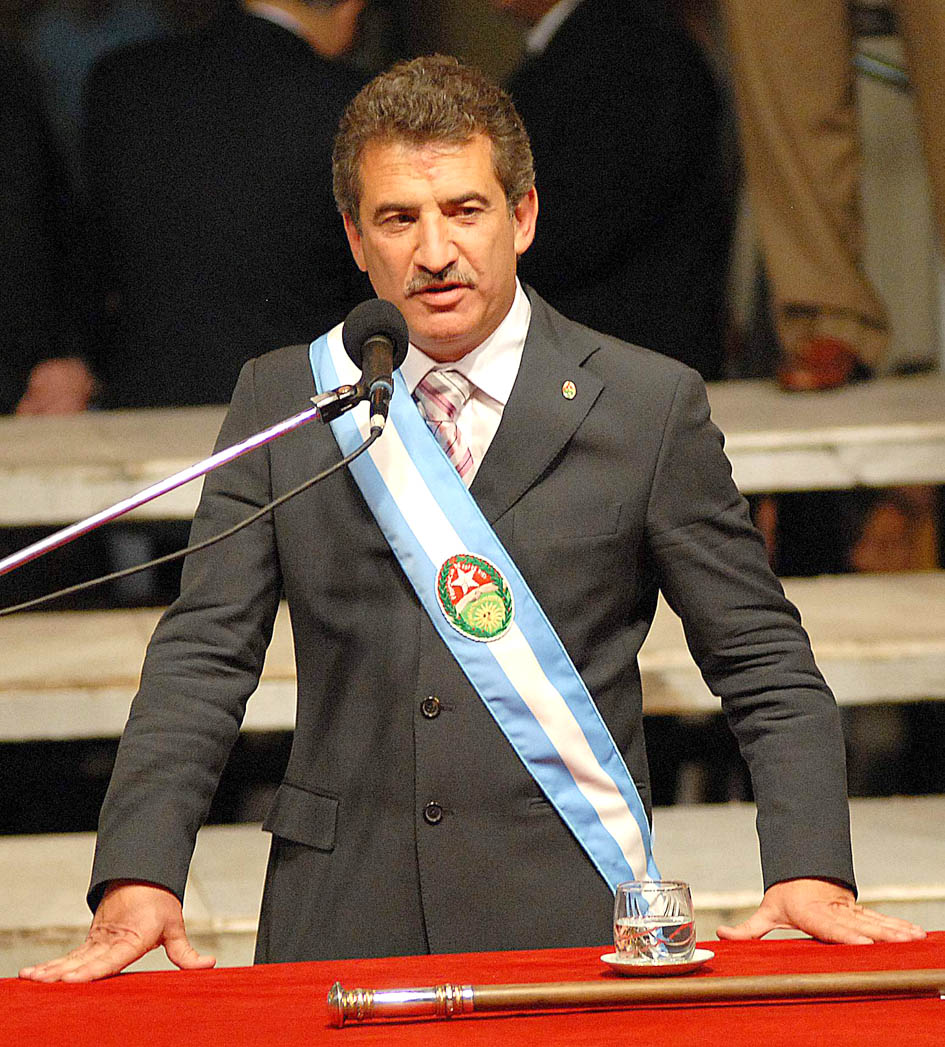
- Urribarri in 2007

Ambassador of Argentina to Israel
- In office 7 May 2020 – 8 April 2022
- President: Alberto Fernández
- Preceded by: Mariano Caucino
- Succeeded by: Shimon Axel Wahnish

Governor of Entre Ríos
- In office 10 December 2007 – 10 December 2015
- Vice Governor: José Lauritto; José Orlando Cáceres
- Preceded by: Jorge Busti
- Succeeded by: Gustavo Bordet

Personal details
- Born: 7 October 1958 (age 67) Arroyo Barú, Entre Ríos, Argentina
- Party: Justicialist Party
- Spouse: Analía Aguilera
- Children: 4

Sergio Daniel Urribarri (born 7 October 1958) is an Argentine Justicialist Party (PJ) politician and former governor of Entre Ríos Province. He was Argentina's ambassador to Israel from 2020 to 2022. In April 2022 he resigned from office after being sentenced to eight years and a perpetual ban from public office for the crimes of negotiations incompatible with public service and embezzlement.

== Biography ==
Early life

Born in the village of Arroyo Barú, Entre Ríos, to Antonia Martínez, a schoolteacher, and Arturo Urribarri, a railway engineer. Urribarri grew up and attended school in Colón, before moving to General Campos, where at the age of 20 he became Director of the public library. He was a successful footballer for the town's club, and in 1985 he was elected Mayor of General Campos. He and his wife Analía married in 1981 and have five sons; one of them, Bruno Urribarri, became a football defender for Club Atlético Colón.

Political career

Urribarri had a lengthy tenure as director of the Concordia Football League and was elected provincial deputy on three occasions, sitting in the provincial legislature between 1991 and 2003. He served as head of CAFESG, the governing body of the hydroelectric plant at the Salto Grande Dam from 2003, and then as minister of government, justice, education and public works under Governor Jorge Busti, from 2004.

Urribarri was elected Governor on the Front for Victory slate in March 2007. He and Busti were on opposite sides of the 2008 Argentine government conflict with the agricultural sector over higher export tariffs proposed by President Cristina Kirchner (whom Urribarri supported). He bested the UCR candidate, Gustavo Cusinato, with 47% of the vote to Cusinato's 20%. He was re-elected in 2011 with 56% of the vote, defeating Atilio Benedetti of the UCR-led Progressive Civic Front Alliance as well as Busti, who ran on a Federal Peronist ticket.

Following the president's decision in March 2012 to partly renationalize the nation's leading energy firm, YPF, Urribarri suggested as a potential adviser or director Schlumberger oil engineer and executive Miguel Galluccio; the Entre Ríos native was appointed CEO of YPF upon the firm's renationalization on May 5.

In 2019 the Argentine government nominated him to be the country's ambassador in the State of Israel. On 7 January 2020 his credentials were accepted by the Israeli government. In April 2022, Urribarri was convicted of corruption and resigned from the position. Shimon Axel Wahnish was nominated as his replacement in December 2023.

== Corruption, conviction and imprisonment ==
In April 2022, Urribarri was sentenced to eight years in prison and permanently disqualified from public office for embezzlement and negotiations incompatible with public office, involving the diversion of provincial funds and expenditures promoting his unsuccessful 2015 presidential campaign. His former minister Pedro Báez and brother-in-law Juan Pablo Aguilera were each sentenced to six and a half years; the court found that Aguilera. In September 2026, the Supreme Court rejected the remaining appeals, making the sentences final, and all three were imprisoned.

The prosecution was coordinated by Entre Ríos anti-corruption prosecutor Cecilia Goyeneche. While investigating Urribarri and other officials, she was impeached and removed from office in 2022, a process proven to be political retaliation for her investigations. Argentina's Supreme Court later annulled the proceedings over serious due-process irregularities, and Goyeneche was reinstated.

Ongoing Investigations

There are other pending separate investigation for Urribarri's alleged illicit enrichment, a forensic accounting examination reported approximately US$9 million in assets and expenditures that investigators said Urribarri could not justify, including a US$1.2 million apartment in Puerto Madero, Cars, travel and a US$25,000 Rolex reportedly purchased for his wife. These cases remain open and investigations ongoing.

Political offices
Preceded by Jorge Busti (PJ)	Governor of Entre Ríos (PJ); 2007–2015	Succeeded by Gustavo Bordet (PJ)
