= Victoria Department =

Coordinates: 32°37′18″S 60°09′28″W

Victoria Departamento Victoria
- Department
- Location of Victoria Department within Entre Ríos Province
- Country: Argentina
- Province: Entre Ríos Province
- Seat: Victoria

Area
  - Total: 6,822 km^{2} (2,634 sq mi)

Population (2022)
  - Total: 40,652
  - Density: 5.959/km^{2} (15.43/sq mi)

Victoria Department is one of the departments of Entre Ríos Province, Argentina. The seat is at Victoria.
