= Arroyo Barú =

- Municipality and village
- Location within Argentina
- Coordinates: 31°52′S 58°26′W
- Country: Argentina
- Province: Entre Ríos
- Time zone: UTC−3 (ART)

Arroyo Barú is a village and municipality in Entre Ríos Province in north-eastern Argentina. The name of the village comes from the stream that runs 5 km away from the train station (50 km Northeast of Colón), which was named after a Spanish Lieutenant who owned the lands in 1776.

== Population ==
Arroyo Barú has 680 inhabitants (INDEC, 2001), which shows a 54,55% increase compared to the previous (1991) census figures.

== Tourism ==
There are tours of the stream, and there's a local museum. There are also tourist train rides available on Sundays. It is considered an attractive spot for ecotourism, cross country walks, birdwatching, fishing and rural activities. Each November the village sees the pilgrimage to the Virgin Medalla Milagrosa de Barú pass, as this lies 40 km away.
