= Victoria, Entre Ríos =

Victoria
- City
- Victoria's City Hall

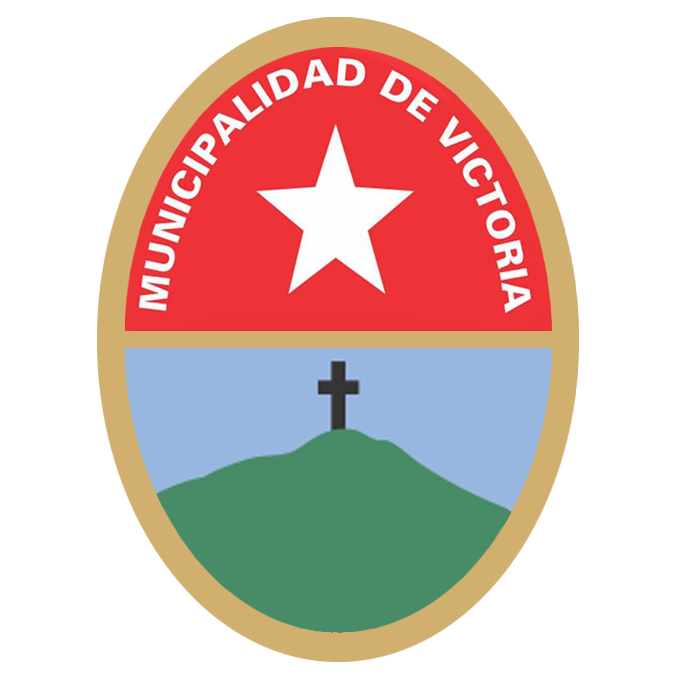
- Seal

- Location of Victoria in Argentina
- Coordinates: 32°37′S 60°10′W
- Country: Argentina
- Province: Entre Ríos
- Department: Victoria Department

Government
  - Intendente: Domingo N. Maiocco (Radical Civic Union-Cambiemos)
- Elevation: 64 m (210 ft)

Population (2012)
  - Total: 32,411
- Demonym: victoriense
- Time zone: UTC−3 (ART)
- CPA base: E3153
- Dialing code: +54 3436
- Website: Official website

Victoria is a city located in the southwestern part of the province of Entre Ríos, Argentina. It is located on the eastern shore of the Paraná River, opposite Rosario, Santa Fe, to which it has been connected since 2003 by the Rosario-Victoria Bridge (which spans almost 60 km over the flood plain of the Paraná Delta).

The site of a 1750 defeat of a native uprising and an 1810 oratory to the Virgin of Aranzazú, a Marian apparition and the city's patron saint, Cerro La Matanza was granted Village status by the Provincial Legislature, in 1826. An 1829 edict renamed the hamlet Victoria. The church (started in 1872) is dedicated to this patron. Designated a "city" in 1851, Victoria also features an abbey (Abadía Los Monjes del Niño Dios), founded by Benedictine monks who arrived in 1899.

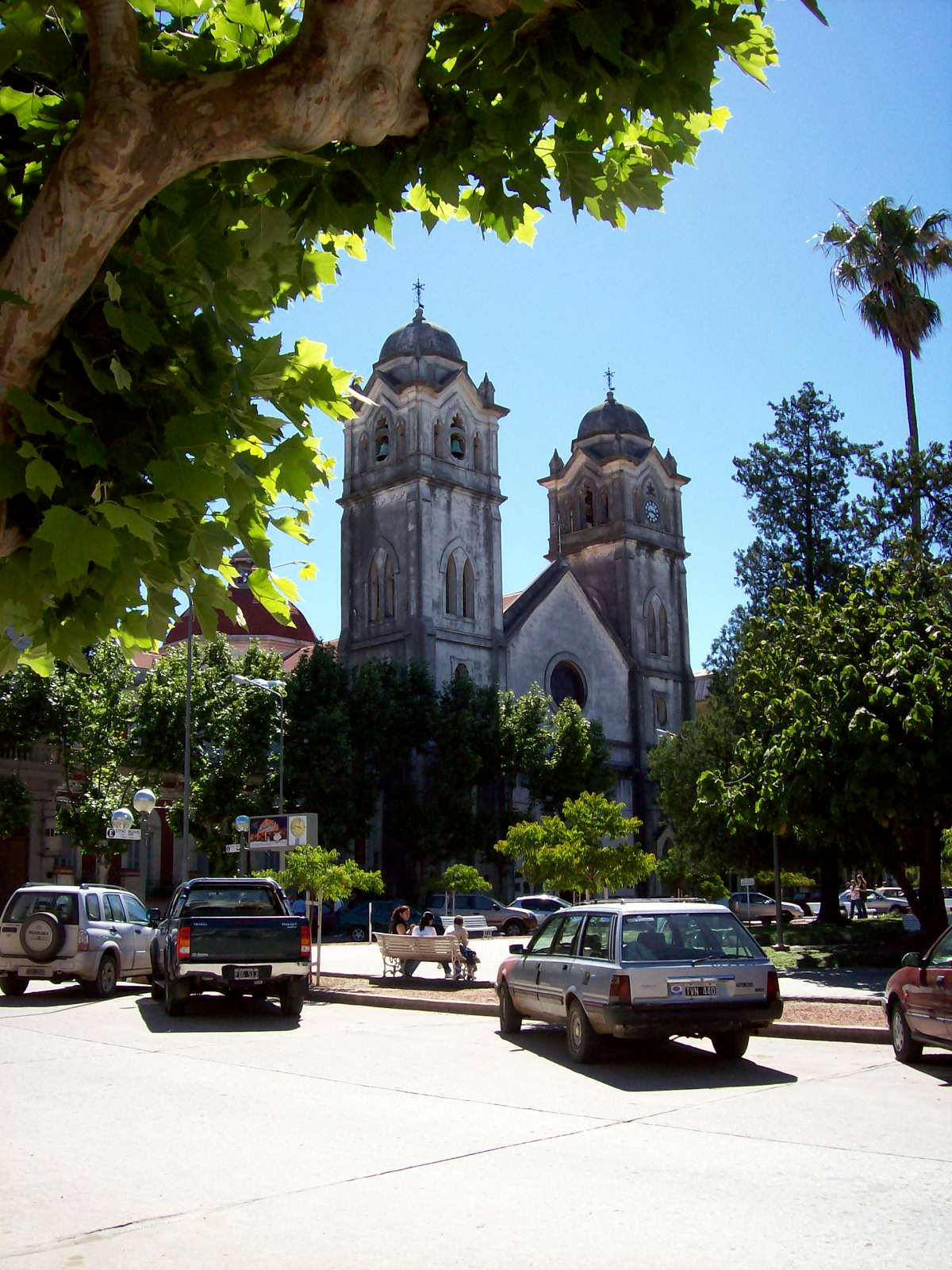
Parish of the Virgin of Aranzazú

The Victoria region is at the core of the fishing industry of commercially important species like sábalo (Prochilodus lineatus) and surubí (Pseudoplatystoma spp.); it produces 95% of the annual 27,000 tonnes of sábalo captured in the province. Concerns about over-exploitation of this resource have been raised lately.

The city has a beach resort, and the river at this point is appropriate for the practice of sports such as kayak sailing and windsurf. The municipality claims jurisdiction over 3,700 km^{2} of islands and islets on the Paraná. Several fishing areas are reserved for sports purposes, while others are protected.

Every year Victoria hosts an extended Carnival Season; in 2005, for example, parades and dances were held on weekends from January to the beginning of March.

Victoria has seen increased touristic affluence since the opening of the connection with Rosario and the Greater Rosario area. A year later the high-class Casino was opened on the river front; and being one of the biggest such in the country it has brought much wealth for Victoria's tourism industry, attracting gamblers on a national scale.

== Tourism ==
Victoria, also known as the city of seven hills (is located on one of the seven hills in the area) is a major tourist destination in the province. Among its facilities are: innumerable hotels of different categories which highlights the five-star hotel and the most luxurious casino in the country. It is also known for its traditional and centennial carnivals (under the slogan "the most fun carnival in the country") which has earned it the distinction of being the "Provincial Capital of Carnival Entrerriano", a title given at the beginning of the 1970s, thanks to its contribution to tourism.
