= National University of Entre Ríos =

Coordinates: 32.4839°S 58.2314°W

- Universidad Nacional de Entre Ríos
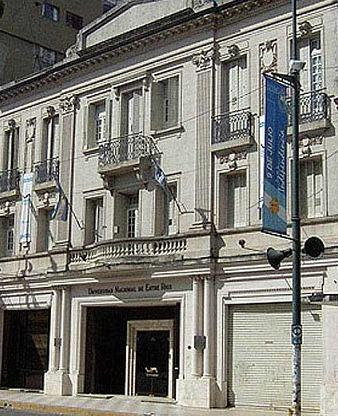
- Administrative offices
- Type: Public
- Established: 1973
- Academic staff: 2,338
- Students: 12,427
- Location: Concepción del Uruguay, Entre Ríos, Argentina
- Website: www.uner.edu.ar

The National University of Entre Ríos (Spanish: Universidad Nacional de Entre Ríos, UNER) is an Argentine national university situated in the city of Concepción del Uruguay, Entre Ríos.

== See also ==
- List of Argentine universities
- Science and Education in Argentina
- Argentine Higher Education Official Site
- Argentine Universities
