= Bicentennial fund =

Argentine government fund

The Bicentennial fund (Spanish: Fondo del Bicentenario) was created in 2010 in Argentina by then president Cristina Fernández de Kirchner, to pay external debt with resources from the Central Bank. The president of the Bank, Martín Redrado, refused to do so, claiming that the autonomy of the Central Bank was not respected.

== The event ==
The 2010 year began with controversy surrounding the president's order that a US$6.7 billion escrow account be opened at the Central Bank for the purpose of retiring high-interest bonds, whose principal is tied to inflation. The move met with the opposition of Central Bank president Martín Redrado, who refused to implement it, and following an impasse, he was dismissed by presidential decree on 7 January 2010. Redrado refused to abide by the initial decree removing him from the presidency of the Central Bank, however, and petitioned for a judicial power to keep him in office. Accordingly, the president enacted another decree for his dismissal, citing misconduct on Redrado's part. The legitimacy of this new decree was questioned as well, as his dismissal would deny Redrado due process. Congress was in recess period at the time, but most of its opposition members considered returning to override the decrees through an extraordinary session. The session became a source of controversy as well: Kirchner considered that, according to the 63rd article of the Constitution, only the President may call for an extraordinary session while the Congress is in recess. Cobos replied instead that all regulations concerning decrees require the immediate advice and consent of Congress, that the body's by-laws (56 and 57) allow extraordinary sessions called by any member, and that the commission formed for that purpose functions at all times, even during recess.

The planned use of foreign exchange reserves through a Necessity and Urgency Decree was itself questioned by several opposition figures, who argued that such a decree may not meet a threshold of "necessity" and "urgency" required by the Constitution of Argentina for its enactment. Judge María José Sarmiento handed down a ruling preventing said use of reserves, and the Government reacted by appealing the ruling. President Kirchner defended the policy as a cost-saving maneuver, whereby government bonds paying out 15 percent interest would be retired from the market. The move, however, also provided numerous vulture funds (holdouts from the 2005 debt restructuring who had resorted to the courts in a bid for higher returns on their defaulted bonds) a legal argument against the central bank's independence, thus facilitating a judgment lien on 12 January against a central bank account in New York. Judge Sarmiento also annulled the decree that removed Redrado and reinstated him as president of the Central Bank the following day. The ruling refuted claims of misconduct cited by president Cristina Kirchner to justify his removal. International media described the attempted removal of Redrado as authoritarian, while criticizing the planned use of reserves for debt retirement, as well as accelerating spending growth, as fiscally irresponsible. Opposition Congresswoman Elisa Carrió, a candidate in the 2011 presidential campaign, has raised the possibility of impeachment procedures against Cristina Kirchner. At the start of February 2010, one of Fernández de Kirchner's private assessors resigned his post due to the claims of "illicit gain". Just two weeks afterwards, another of her private assessors, Julio Daniel Álvarez, resigned for the same reason.

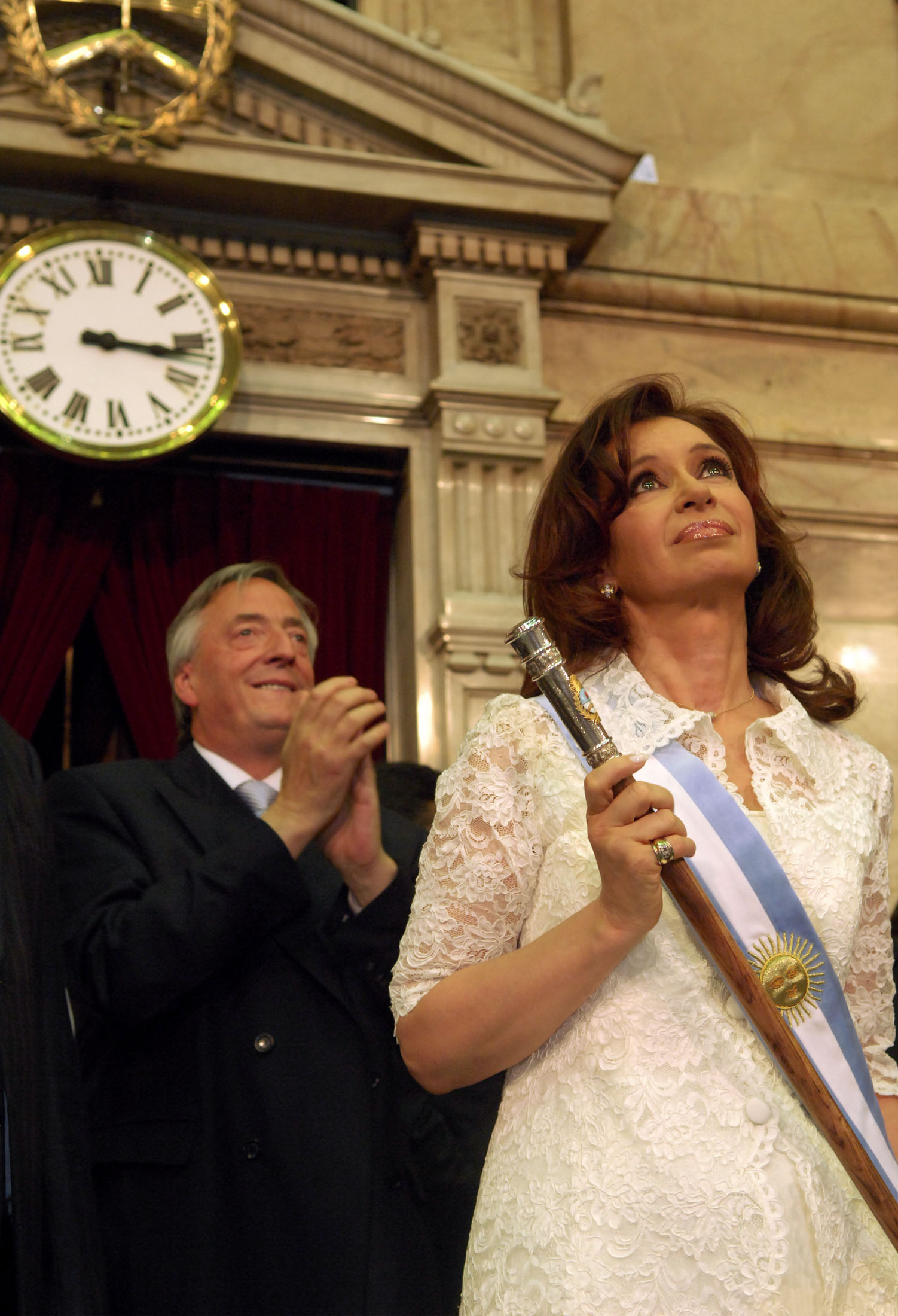
Néstor Kirchner and Cristina Fernandez in her first inauguration day in 2007. Kirchner gave power to his wife after 4 years in office

In June 2010, her administration completed the debt swap (which had been started by former president Néstor Kirchner in 2005) clearing 92% of the bad debt left from its sovereign default of 2001. Argentina's external debt now represented 30% of the country's GDP, whilst the Central Bank foreign reserves reached US$49 billion, more than the amount that was available when the decision to pay foreign debt earlier in the year was taken. Also in June 2010, she gave a speech at the International Trade Union Confederation (CSI) Global Summit, held in Vancouver, British Columbia, Canada, where she asserted "many Euro-zone countries today have applied the same policies that led Argentina to disaster (in 2001)", stating "it's an inescapable responsibility of the government to intervene in the financial system".
