= Cristina Fernández de Kirchner =

President of Argentina from 2007 to 2015

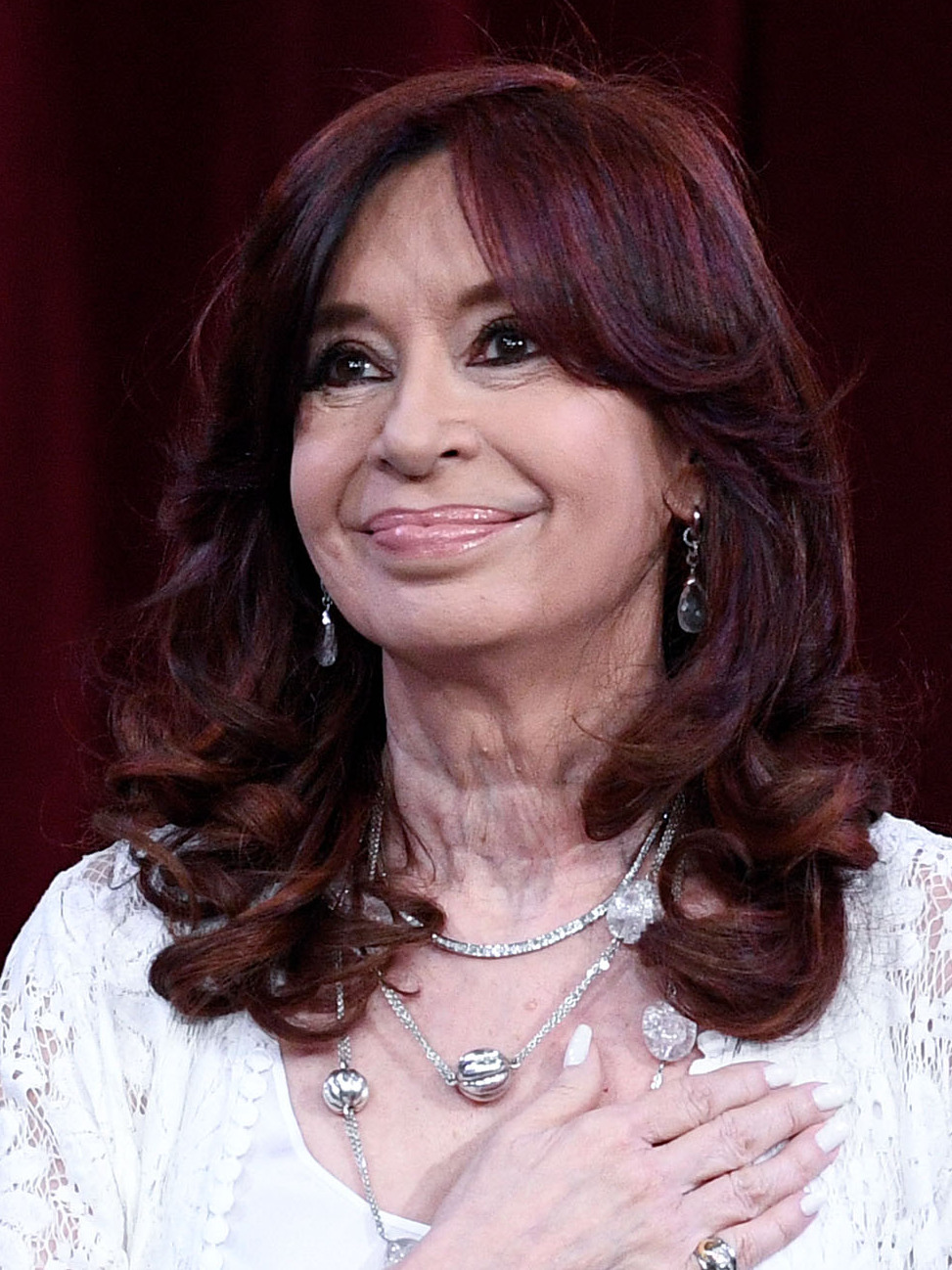
- Fernández de Kirchner in 2022

President of the Justicialist Party
- Incumbent
- Assumed office 17 November 2024
- Vice President: José Mayans
- Preceded by: Alberto Fernández

55th President of Argentina
- In office 10 December 2007 – 10 December 2015
- Vice President: Julio Cobos; Amado Boudou
- Preceded by: Néstor Kirchner
- Succeeded by: Mauricio Macri (Note: On 10 December 2015, the court, led by María Romilda Servini, ruled that outgoing President Fernández de Kirchner's presidential term ended on 9 December 2015. Federico Pinedo, as the provisional president of the Senate, based on the Argentine presidential line of succession, assumes presidential powers and duties from midnight of 10 December until Mauricio Macri assumed office at noon of the same day.)

37th Vice President of Argentina
- In office 10 December 2019 – 10 December 2023
- President: Alberto Fernández
- Preceded by: Gabriela Michetti
- Succeeded by: Victoria Villarruel
Ceremonial roles
First Lady of Argentina
In role 25 May 2003 – 10 December 2007
President	Néstor Kirchner
Preceded by	Hilda González de Duhalde
Succeeded by	Néstor Kirchner (as First Gentleman)
First Lady of Santa Cruz
In role 10 December 1991 – 25 May 2003
Governor	Néstor Kirchner
Preceded by	Marta Arana de García
Succeeded by	María Gloria Ros de Icazuriaga
First Lady of Río Gallegos
In role 10 December 1987 – 10 December 1991
Intendant	Néstor Kirchner
Preceded by	Sofía Vicic de Cepernic
Succeeded by	Eva María Henríquez de Martínez
Parliamentary offices
National Senator
In office 10 December 2017 – 10 December 2019
Constituency	Buenos Aires
In office 10 December 2005 – 28 November 2007
Constituency	Buenos Aires
In office 10 December 2001 – 10 December 2005
Constituency	Santa Cruz
In office 10 December 1995 – 3 December 1997
Constituency	Santa Cruz
National Deputy
In office 10 December 1997 – 10 December 2001
Constituency	Santa Cruz
Member of the Constitutional Convention
In office 1 May 1994 – 22 August 1994
Constituency	Santa Cruz
Provincial Deputy of Santa Cruz
In office 10 December 1989 – 10 December 1995
Constituency	Río Gallegos

Personal details
- Born: Cristina Elisabet Fernández; 19 February 1953 (age 73) La Plata, Buenos Aires, Argentina
- Party: Justicialist
- Other political affiliations: Front for Victory (2003–2017); Citizen's Unity (2017–2019); Everyone's Front (2019–2023); Union for the Homeland (since 2023)
- Spouse: Néstor Kirchner (m. 1975; died 2010)
- Children: 2, including Máximo
- Education: National University of La Plata
- Occupation: Politician; lawyer
- Website: cfkargentina.com
- Criminal information
- Status: Imprisoned
- Conviction: Corruption
- Penalty: 6 years in prison

Details
- Date apprehended: 17 June 2025
- Imprisoned at: House arrest (Buenos Aires, Argentina)

Cristina Elisabet Fernández de Kirchner (Note: Latin American Spanish: [kɾisˈtina elisa'βet feɾˈnandes ðe ˈkiɾʃneɾ].) (Note: She is variously known as Cristina Fernández, Cristina Kirchner, simply Cristina, or by her initials CFK, among others.) (born 19 February 1953) is an Argentine lawyer and politician who served as the 55th President of Argentina from 2007 to 2015, and later as the 37th Vice President of Argentina under President Alberto Fernández from 2019 to 2023. The widow of Néstor Kirchner, she was also First Lady during his presidency from 2003 to 2007. She was the second female president of Argentina after Isabel Perón and the first to be directly elected to office. Ideologically self-identified as a Peronist and a progressive, her political approach is called Kirchnerism. Since 2024, she has been the president of the Justicialist Party.

Born in La Plata, Buenos Aires Province, she studied law at the National University of La Plata, and moved to Río Gallegos, Santa Cruz, with her husband, Néstor Kirchner, upon graduation. She was elected to the provincial legislature, while her husband was elected mayor of Río Gallegos. She was elected national senator in 1995, and had a controversial tenure, while her husband was elected governor of Santa Cruz. In 1994, she was also elected to the constituent assembly that amended the Constitution of Argentina.

Néstor Kirchner did not run for re-election. Instead, she became the candidate for the Front for Victory alliance, becoming president in the 2007 presidential election. Her first term of office started with a conflict with the agricultural sector, and her proposed taxation system was rejected. After this she nationalized private pension funds, and fired the president of the Central Bank. The price of public services remained subsidized, and she renationalized energy firm YPF as a result. The country had good relations with other South American nations, and strained relations with the western bloc as part of the regional political movement known as pink tide. She also continued her husband's human rights policies, and had a rocky relationship with the press. Néstor Kirchner died in 2010, and she was re-elected for a second term in 2011. She won the 2011 general election with 54.11% of the votes, the highest percentage obtained by any presidential candidate since 1983. She established currency controls during her second term, and the country fell into sovereign default in 2014.

During her terms as president, several corruption scandals surfaced and her government subsequently faced several demonstrations. She was acquitted of charges related to fraudulent low price sales of dollar futures. In 2015, she was indicted for obstructing the investigation into the 1994 AMIA bombing after federal prosecutor Alberto Nisman filed a legal complaint, alleging that the Memorandum of Understanding signed in 2013 between Argentina and Iran secured impunity for Iranians involved in the terrorist attack. In 2017, an arrest warrant issued by Claudio Bonadio charged her with "treason". Due to her parliamentary immunity, she did not go to prison, and the treason accusation was later dropped, while other charges related to Nisman's accusation remained. In 2018, she was indicted for corruption over allegations that her administration had accepted bribes in exchange for public works contracts. In September 2020, the federal criminal cassation court confirmed the corruption trials of Fernández de Kirchner, ruling her objections inadmissible. In October 2021, the Federal Oral Court 8 ruled that no crime had been committed in the Iran-memorandum case, and dismissed the charges against Fernández de Kirchner. In December 2024, the Supreme Court affirmed a 2023 ruling that revoked the acquittal handed down by Court 8, and ordered Fernández to stand trial for this case. In December 2022, she was sentenced in the road infrastructure case to six years in prison and a lifetime ban from holding public office for corruption. The verdict was upheld by a federal appeals court in November 2024, and by the Supreme Court in June 2025.

== Early life and education ==
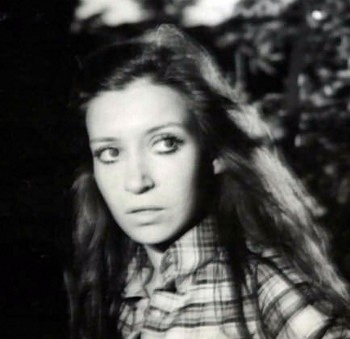
Cristina Fernández at age 17, 1970

Cristina Fernández was born on 19 February 1953 in Tolosa, a suburb of La Plata, capital of the Buenos Aires Province. She is the daughter of Eduardo Fernández and Ofelia Esther Wilhelm. Eduardo was a bus driver and an anti-Peronist, and Ofelia was a Peronist union leader and a single mother. Fernández married her and moved into her house when Cristina was two years old. Most details about her childhood such as her elementary school are unknown. She attended high school at Popular Mercantil and Misericordia schools. Three of her grandparents were Spanish immigrants, specifically from Galicia.

She began her college studies at the National University of La Plata. She studied psychology for a year, then dropped it and studied law instead. She met fellow student Néstor Kirchner in 1973. He introduced her to political debates. There were heated political controversies at the time caused by the decline of the Argentine Revolution military government, the return of the former president Juan Perón from exile, the election of Héctor Cámpora as president of Argentina, and the early stages of the Dirty War. She became influenced by Peronism, left-wing politics, and anti-imperialism. Despite the presence of sympathizers of the Montoneros guerrillas in La Plata, the Kirchners had never been involved themselves. Cristina and Néstor married in a civil ceremony on 9 May 1975. Her mother got them administrative jobs at her union. The 1976 Argentine coup d'état took place the following year. Cristina proposed to move to Río Gallegos, Néstor's home city, but he delayed their departure until his graduation on 3 July 1976.

Cristina had not yet graduated when they moved to Río Gallegos and completed the remaining subjects with distance education. There have been claims made that she never graduated and that she may have worked as a lawyer without having a degree. This idea was proposed by the constitutionalist Daniel Sabsay, and fueled by the reluctance of the National University of La Plata (UNLP) to release her degree. She registered at the Tribunal Superior de Justicia of Santa Cruz in 1980, Comodoro Rivadavia's chamber of appeals in 1985 and worked as an attorney for the Justicialist Party in 1983. There are also logs of minor cases where she acted as a lawyer. The claim has been sent to trial four times, and the judges Norberto Oyarbide, Ariel Lijo, Sergio Torres, and Claudio Bonadio all ruled that she has a degree.

Néstor established a law firm that Cristina joined in 1979. The firm worked for banks and financial groups that filed eviction lawsuits, which had a growing rate at the time because the 1050 ruling of the Central Bank had increased the interest rates for mortgage loans. The Kirchners acquired twenty-one land lots at cheap prices as they were about to be auctioned. Their law firm defended military personnel accused of committing crimes during the Dirty War. Forced disappearances were common at the time, but unlike other lawyers the Kirchners never signed a habeas corpus. Julio César Strassera, prosecutor in the 1985 Trial of the Juntas against the military, criticized the Kirchners' lack of legal actions against the military, and considered their later interest in the issue a form of hypocrisy.

== Political career ==
Fernández de Kirchner was elected deputy for the provincial legislature of Santa Cruz in 1989. The Justicialist Party (PJ), led by Carlos Menem, returned to the presidency in the 1989 general elections. She served as interim governor of Santa Cruz for a couple of days, after the impeachment of Ricardo del Val in 1990. She organized Néstor's political campaign when he was elected governor of Santa Cruz in 1991. In 1994, she was elected to the constituent assembly that amended the Constitution of Argentina.

She was elected national senator in the 1995 general elections. She opposed some bills proposed by Menem, such as a treaty with Chilean president Patricio Aylwin that benefited Chile in a dispute over the Argentina–Chile border. The Minister of Defense Oscar Camilión was questioned in Congress about the Argentine arms trafficking scandal; Kirchner told him that he had to resign, which he refused to do. As a result, she made a name for herself as a troublemaker. She was removed from the PJ bloc in the Congress in 1997 for misconduct. She resigned her senatorial seat that year and ran for national deputy in the 1997 midterm elections instead. Menem ended his term of office in 1999 and was replaced by Fernando de la Rúa. Fernández de Kirchner took part in a commission to investigate money laundering with fellow legislator Elisa Carrió, and got into conflicts with her. She ran again for senator in the 2001 midterm elections.

Néstor Kirchner was elected president in 2003, and she became the First Lady. Under these circumstances, she sought a lower profile in Congress. Her husband had a political dispute with the previous president, Eduardo Duhalde. Their dispute continued during the midterms. Without consensus in the PJ for a single candidate for senator of the Buenos Aires province, both leaders had their respective wives run for the office: Hilda González de Duhalde for the PJ, and Cristina Fernández de Kirchner for the Front for Victory. She later won the election.

== Presidential campaigns ==
=== 2007 presidential campaign ===
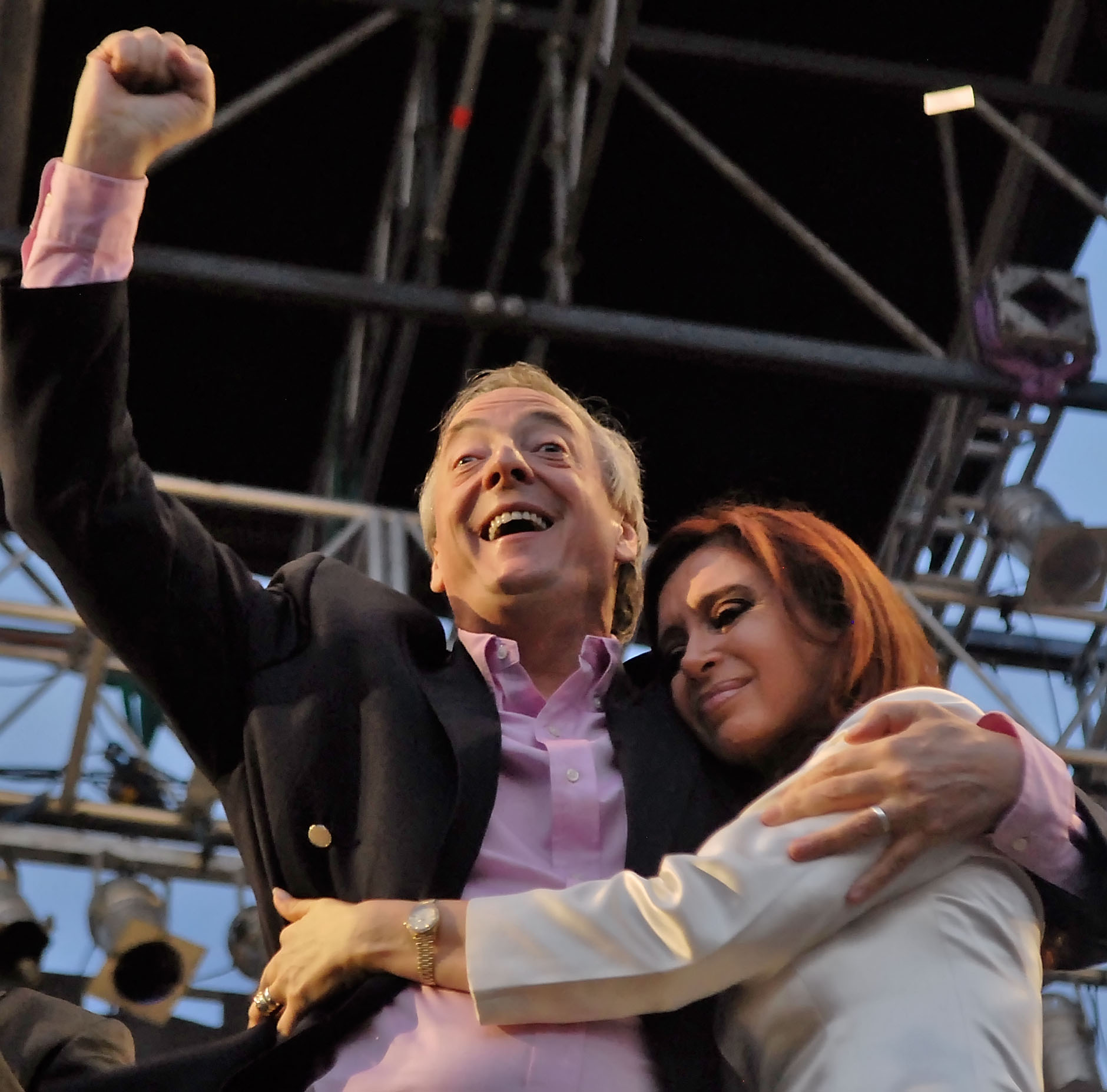
First Lady Cristina Fernández de Kirchner (right) campaigning alongside her husband, Néstor Kirchner, in 2007

The presidential election was held on 28 October 2007. With Fernández de Kirchner leading all the pre-election polls by a wide margin, her challengers focused on forcing her into a ballotage. To win in a single round, a presidential candidate in Argentina needs either more than 45% of the vote or 40% of the vote and a lead of more than 10 percentage points over the runner-up. However, with 13 challengers splitting the vote, she won the election decisively in the first round with just over 45% of the vote, compared to 23% for Elisa Carrió (candidate for the Civic Coalition) and 17% for former Economy Minister Roberto Lavagna. Fernández de Kirchner was popular among the suburban working class and the rural poor, while Carrió and Lavagna both received more support from the urban middle class. She lost the election in the large cities of Buenos Aires and Rosario.

On 14 November, the president-elect announced the names of her new cabinet, which was sworn in on 10 December. Of the twelve ministers appointed, seven had been ministers in Néstor Kirchner's government, while the other five took office for the first time. The selections anticipated the continuation of the policies implemented by Néstor Kirchner.

She began a four-year term on 10 December 2007, facing challenges including: inflation, poor public security, international credibility, a faulty energy infrastructure, and protests from the agricultural sectors over an increase of nearly 30% on export taxes. Fernández de Kirchner was the second female president of Argentina, after Isabel Perón, but, unlike Perón, she was elected to the office, whereas Isabel Perón was elected Juan Perón's vice president, and automatically assumed the presidency on his death. The transition from Néstor Kirchner to Cristina Fernández de Kirchner was also the first time a democratic head of state was replaced by their spouse without the death of either. He remained highly influential during his wife's term, supervising the economy and leading the PJ. Their marriage has been compared with those of Juan and Eva Perón and Bill and Hillary Clinton. Media observers suspected that Mr. Kirchner stepped down as president to circumvent the term limit, swapping roles with his wife.

=== 2011 presidential campaign ===
When Néstor Kirchner refused to run for re-election in 2007 and proposed his wife instead, it was rumoured that they could alternate in the presidency for the next 12 years to circumvent the constitutional limit of two consecutive terms. This scenario would have had Cristina standing down in favour of Néstor in 2011, and Néstor would in turn hand the FPV candidacy back to Cristina in 2015. The death of Néstor Kirchner in 2010 derailed such a plan. She had a low positive image, below 30%. On 21 June 2011, she announced that she would run for a second term as president. A few days later, she announced that her economic minister Amado Boudou would run for vice president on her ticket. She personally chose most of the candidates for deputy in the Congress, favouring members of the Cámpora.

The elections took place on 23 October. She was re-elected with 54.11% of the vote, followed by socialist Hermes Binner, 37.3 points behind her. The opposition was divided between several candidates, and the perceived economic prosperity prevailed over voters' concerns about corruption and cronyism. It was the largest victory percentage in national elections since 1983. The Peronist party also won eight of the nine elections for governor held that day, increased their number of senators, and obtained the majority in the chamber of deputies, including the number of legislators needed for quorum. They had lost that majority in the 2009 elections. She invited children on stage during the celebrations, and Vice President Amado Boudou played an electric guitar. As she had in 2007, she gave a conciliatory speech.

== Presidency (2007–2015) ==
=== Economic policy ===
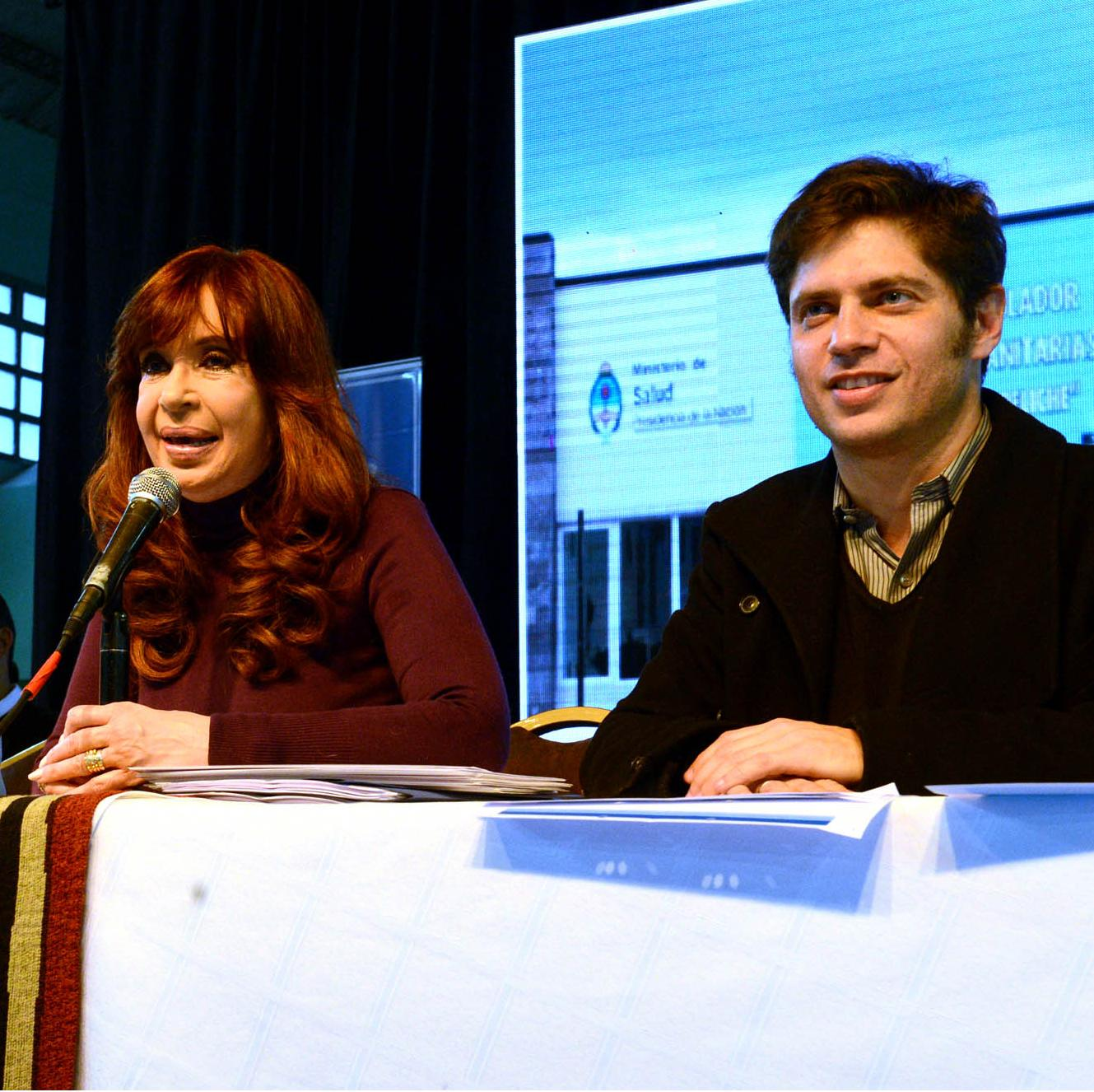
Fernández de Kirchner with minister of economy Axel Kicillof

When she first took office, Fernández de Kirchner replaced the previous minister of economy, Miguel Gustavo Peirano, who had been appointed by her husband as the former president. Peirano was succeeded by Martín Lousteau in December 2007. He served as the first of several ministers of the economy under her presidency. The attempt to increase taxes on agricultural exports caused a conflict with the agricultural sector, and protests broke out. As a result, taxes were not increased, and Lousteau resigned by April 2008, only a few months after he had been appointed. He was replaced by Argentina's tax agency chief Carlos Rafael Fernández.

As an alternative to increasing taxes and facing debt payments the following year, the government nationalized private pension funds, known as "Administradoras de Fondos de Jubilaciones y Pensiones" (AFJP). The amount of money involved in this operation was nearly 30 billion dollars, and debt obligations were nearly 24 billion dollars. The nationalization was justified by the president as government protectionism during the crisis and compared with the bank bailouts in Europe and the United States. It was criticized as a threat to property rights and the rule of law. Fernández resigned after the Kirchnerist defeat in the 2009 elections, and was replaced by Amado Boudou, president of the ANSES, which had worked for that nationalization. Although inflation was nearing 25% and on the rise, Boudou did not consider it a significant problem.

In January 2010, Fernández de Kirchner created the bicentennial fund employing a necessity and urgency decree in order to pay debt obligations with foreign-exchange reserves. Martín Redrado, president of the Central Bank, refused to implement it, and was fired by another decree. Judge María José Sarmiento annulled both decrees on the grounds that the Central Bank was independent. Redrado resigned one month later and was replaced by Mercedes Marcó del Pont. In an attempt to combat poverty, the government introduced in 2009 the Universal Child Allowance, a cash transfer program to parents who are unemployed or in the informal economy. It was later expanded to cover other disadvantaged groups. The extent to which Kirchner's policies have lowered poverty is controversial, with the government's reported poverty rate being questioned by some experts. According to a 2017 UNICEF report, the cash transfers reduced extreme poverty by 30.8% and general poverty by 5.6%.

Fernández de Kirchner was reelected in 2011, along with Amado Boudou as vice president and the Front for Victory regained control over both chambers of Congress. Hernán Lorenzino became the new minister of economy. The government established currency controls that limited the power to buy or sell foreign currencies, especially American dollars. Many Argentines kept their savings in dollars as a hedge against inflation. The government believed the controls were required to prevent the capital flight and tax evasion. They initiated a period of fiscal reform, which included several tax increases, limits to wage increases, but increases in protectionism and reorganization of state-owned enterprises. Hugo Moyano, main union leader, who was a strong supporter of kirchnerism, began to oppose the President. Moyano would later organize a big protest at Plaza de Mayo, with 30,000 people, requesting the abolition of capital gains tax.

Axel Kicillof was appointed minister in 2013 and served for the remainder of Fernández de Kirchner's term. He arranged payment of the debt to the Paris Club, and the compensation requested by Repsol for the nationalization of YPF. One month later, negotiations with hedge funds failed, and American judge Thomas Griesa issued an order that Argentina had to pay to all creditors and not just those who had accepted a reduced payment as outlined in the Argentine debt restructuring plan. Kicillof refused to agree that the country had fallen into a sovereign default. When Argentina devalued the peso in January 2014, Kicillof placed blame on the exchange-market speculation by Juan José Aranguren, chief of Royal Dutch Shell in Argentina; later in the year, when the peso was at its lowest ever position in relation to the dollar, he blamed "vulture funds" from the United States. At the 2014 United Nations conference, she accused the "vulture funds" of destabilizing the economy of the countries and called them "economic terrorists". According to The Economist, the Kirchners returned Argentina to "economic nationalism and near-autarky".

=== Energy policy ===
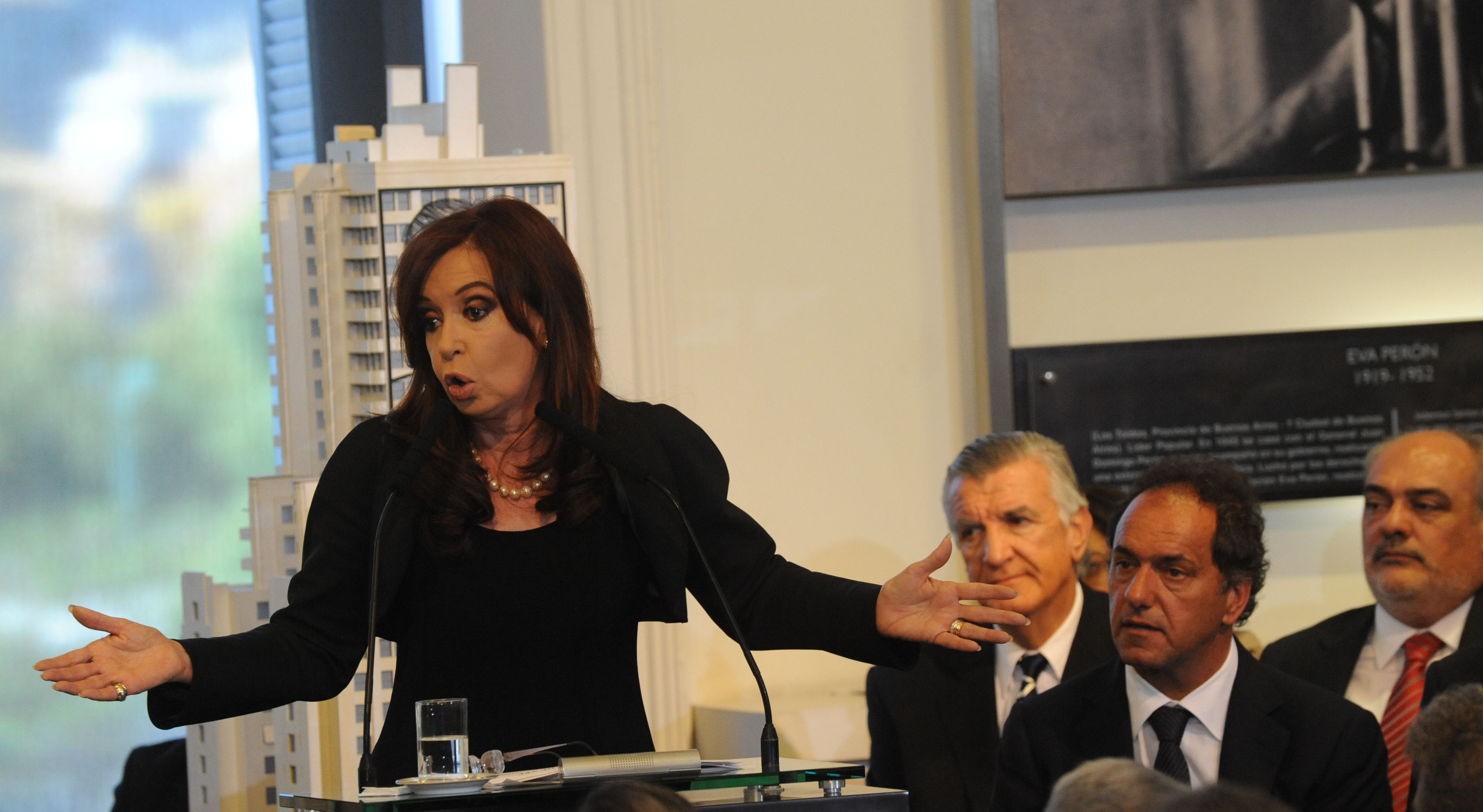
Fernández de Kirchner announces the bill to renationalize YPF.

In 2002, Eduardo Duhalde fixed the prices for public services such as electricity, gas and water supply. These remained fixed during the terms of Duhalde and Néstor, and Cristina Kirchner, despite the crisis that motivated them having ended. As the inflation rate grew during the period, the state financed part of these prices with subsidies. Investment in these areas decreased, and the generation and distribution networks suffered. Argentina lost its self-supply of energy and had to import it, rather than being able to export surpluses.

She proposed a fiscal austerity program in early 2012, including the gradual removal of subsidies. The proposal turned out to be unpopular and was not implemented. She opted instead to send a bill to Congress for the renationalization of YPF, privatized in 1993, blaming the Spanish company Repsol for the energy trade deficit. The bill was approved by the Chamber of Deputies by a 207–32 margin. It was criticized as an authoritarian move, as there was no negotiation with Repsol. As well, the Vaca Muerta oil field had been discovered by this time. However, YPF was unable to afford the costs to exploit the oil at the site, and the rights to drill at Vaca Muerta were sold to the Chevron Corporation. The costs of energy imports increased the trade deficit and the inflation rate, and power outages became frequent. Outages usually took place on the hottest days of the summer season, as the use of air conditioning increased electricity consumption to peak levels.

=== Conflict with the agricultural sector ===
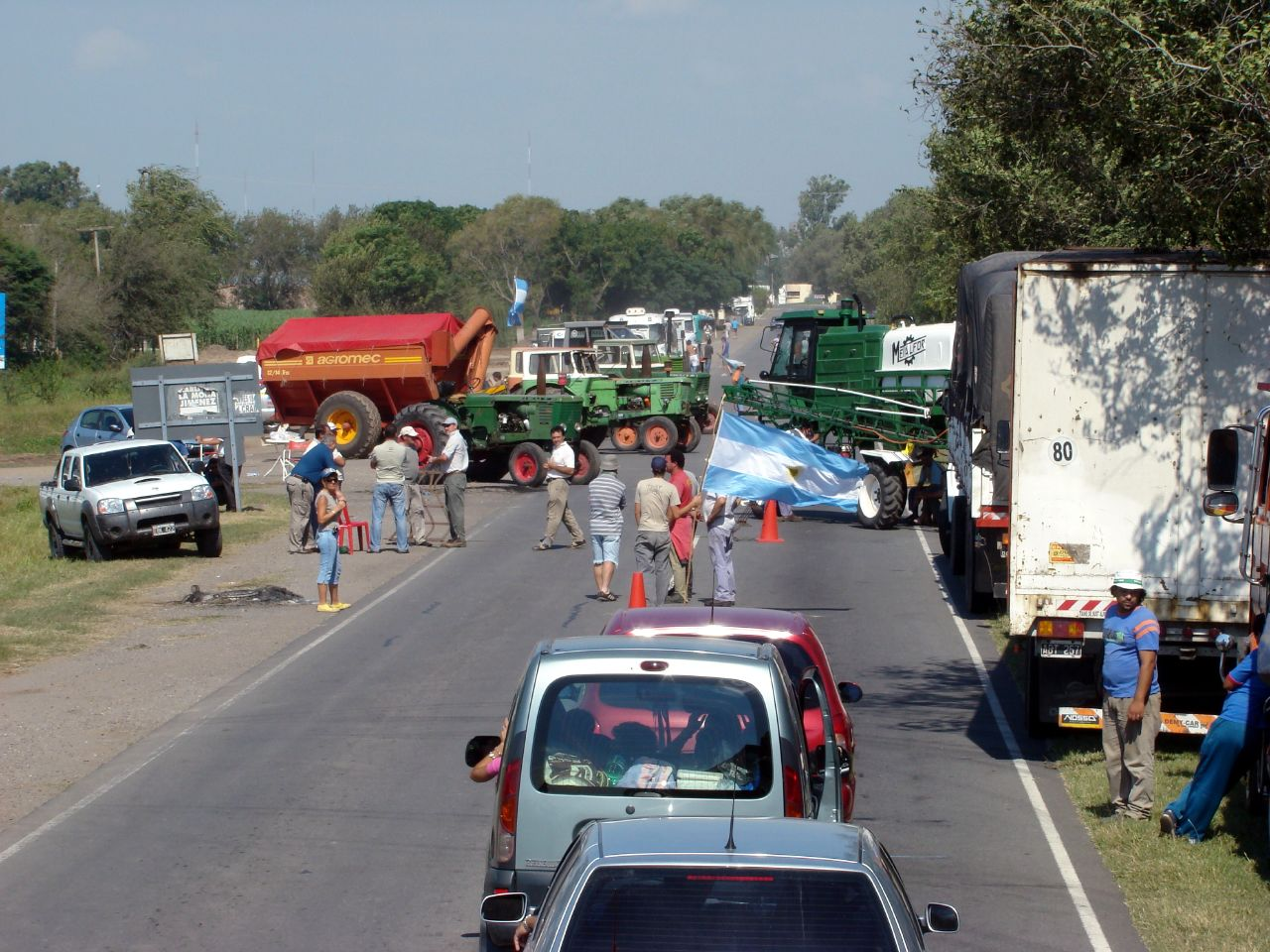
Road blockade during the 2008 Argentine government conflict with the agricultural sector in Villa María, Córdoba

In March 2008, Fernández de Kirchner introduced a new sliding-scale taxation system for agricultural exports, so that rates fluctuated with international prices. This would effectively raise levies on soybean exports from 35% to 44% at the time of the announcement. This new taxation scheme, proposed by Minister Martín Lousteau, led to a nationwide lockout by farming associations, with the aim of forcing the government to back down on the new tax system. They were joined on 25 March by thousands of pot-banging demonstrators massed around the Buenos Aires Obelisk and the presidential palace. These demonstrations were followed by others at locations across the country that included road blockades and food shortages.

The protests were highly polarizing. The government argued that the new taxes would allow for a better redistribution of wealth and keep down the food prices. It also claimed the farmers were staging a coup d'état against Fernández de Kirchner. Farmers argued that the high taxes made cultivation unviable. The activist Luis D'Elía interrupted one of the demonstrations, leading stick-wielding pro-government supporters, who attacked the participants. Minister Lousteau resigned during the crisis, and the Peronist governors opted to negotiate on their own with the farmers, ignoring her approach. Her public image plummeted to its lowest level since the election in October 2007.

After four months of conflict and having the majority in both houses of the Argentine Congress, the president introduced the new taxation bill. However, many legislators gave priority to the local agendas of their provinces as their economies depended heavily on agriculture. Many FPV legislators, such as Rubén Marín, opposed the bill. Marín argued: "For us, agriculture is the economy". There were two demonstrations the day of the vote: one against the bill, attended by 235,000 people, and the other in support of the bill, attended by 100,000 people. Farmers had announced that they would continue their demonstrations if the bill was approved without amendments. Senator Emilio Rached from Santiago del Estero cast the vote that resulted in a 36–36 tie. In the case of a tie, the vice president, who also serves as president of the Senate but without the right to vote, is required to cast the tie-breaking vote. Julio Cobos voted against the bill, which was then rejected, saying that: "My vote is not in favor, my vote is against". Despite the chilly relations between Cobos and Fernández de Kirchner since that event, he completed his term as vice president.

=== Other protests ===
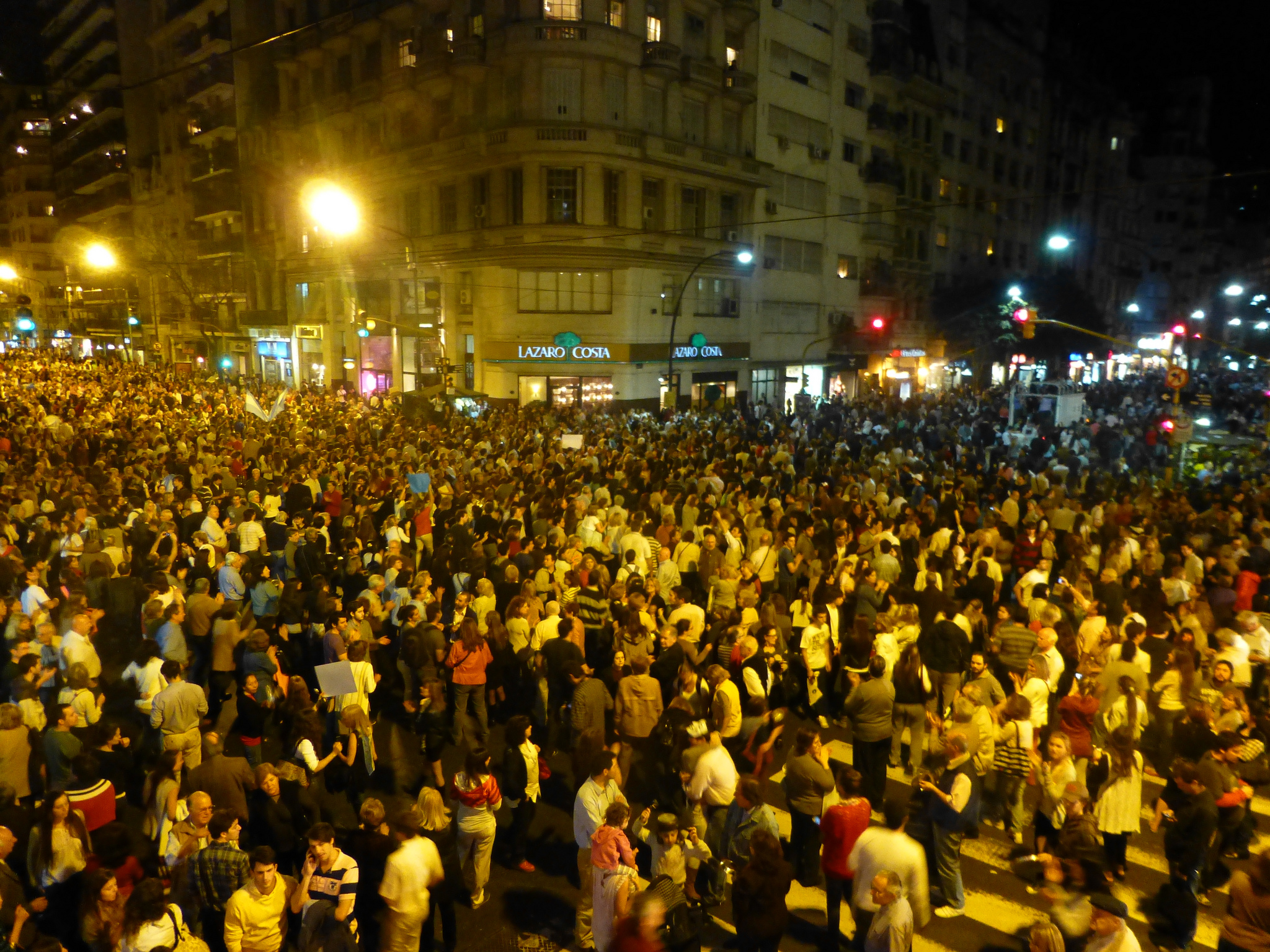
200,000 people took part in a cacerolazo against Fernández de Kirchner.

Fernández de Kirchner was reelected in 2011. The Constitution of Argentina allows only one reelection. Many of her supporters proposed an amendment to the Constitution to allow indefinite reelections. She did not publicly support the proposal but did not discourage or reject it either. The proposal was not taken to the Congress, as the FPV still lacked the required two-thirds majority to approve an amendment bill. It was rejected by many sectors of society. The first big demonstration (a cacerolazo) took place in September 2012. It was not called by specific politicians or social leaders, but by the public using social networks. The massive turnout was completely unexpected by both the government and the opposition. People also protested the 2012 Buenos Aires rail disaster, the conflict between Kirchnerism and the media, rising crime rates, and the tight currency controls. She dismissed the demonstration and said that she would continue working as before. Most of the Fernández de Kirchner loyalists, however, preferred simply to ignore the protest.

A larger demonstration, the 8N, took place two months later. It was attended by nearly half a million people. They protested a variety of issues such as those of the previous demonstration, as well as the growing rate of inflation and the corruption scandals. She promised to keep her policies unchanged, and Senator Aníbal Fernández dismissed the significance of the demonstrations. Journalist Jorge Lanata explained the polarization was because the government and its supporters thought they were engaged in a revolution, and this justified being against freedom of the press and other public rights. Cabinet Chief Juan Manuel Abal Medina said the demonstrators belonged to a class that was against social justice and compared the demonstrations to a coup d'état. A similar view was held by Fernández de Kirchner's loyalists.

Buenos Aires and La Plata suffered floods in April, resulting in more than 70 deaths. Mayor Mauricio Macri pointed out that the national government had prevented the city from taking out international loans, which would have been used for infrastructure improvements. A week later, Fernández de Kirchner announced a proposed amendment of the Argentine judiciary. Three bills were controversial: the first proposed to limit injunctions against the state; the second would include people selected in national elections on the body that appoints or removes judges; the third would create a new court that would limit the number of cases heard by the Supreme Court. The opposition considered the bills an attempt to control the judiciary. The 2013 season of the investigative journalism programme Periodismo para todos revealed an ongoing case of political corruption involving Néstor Kirchner, called "The Route of the K-Money", which generated a huge political controversy. This led to a new cacerolazo on 18 April, known as the 18A.

Prosecutor Alberto Nisman, who worked on the investigation of the 1994 Asociación Mutual Israelita Argentina (Argentine-Israeli Mutual Association) AMIA bombing, accused Fernández de Kirchner of engaging in a criminal, cover-up conspiracy to cover up the attack. He was found dead in his home the day before he was to explain his denunciation in Congress. Argentine law enforcement concluded that Nisman's death was a homicide. The unsolved case was highly controversial. The 18F demonstration took place a month after his death. It was organized as a silent demonstration, as an homage to Alberto Nisman, and was devoid of political flags or banners. The rule was followed, with occasional exceptions, by waves of spontaneous clapping or people singing the Argentine national anthem. The city police estimated that the demonstration was attended by 400,000 people.

=== Corruption cases ===
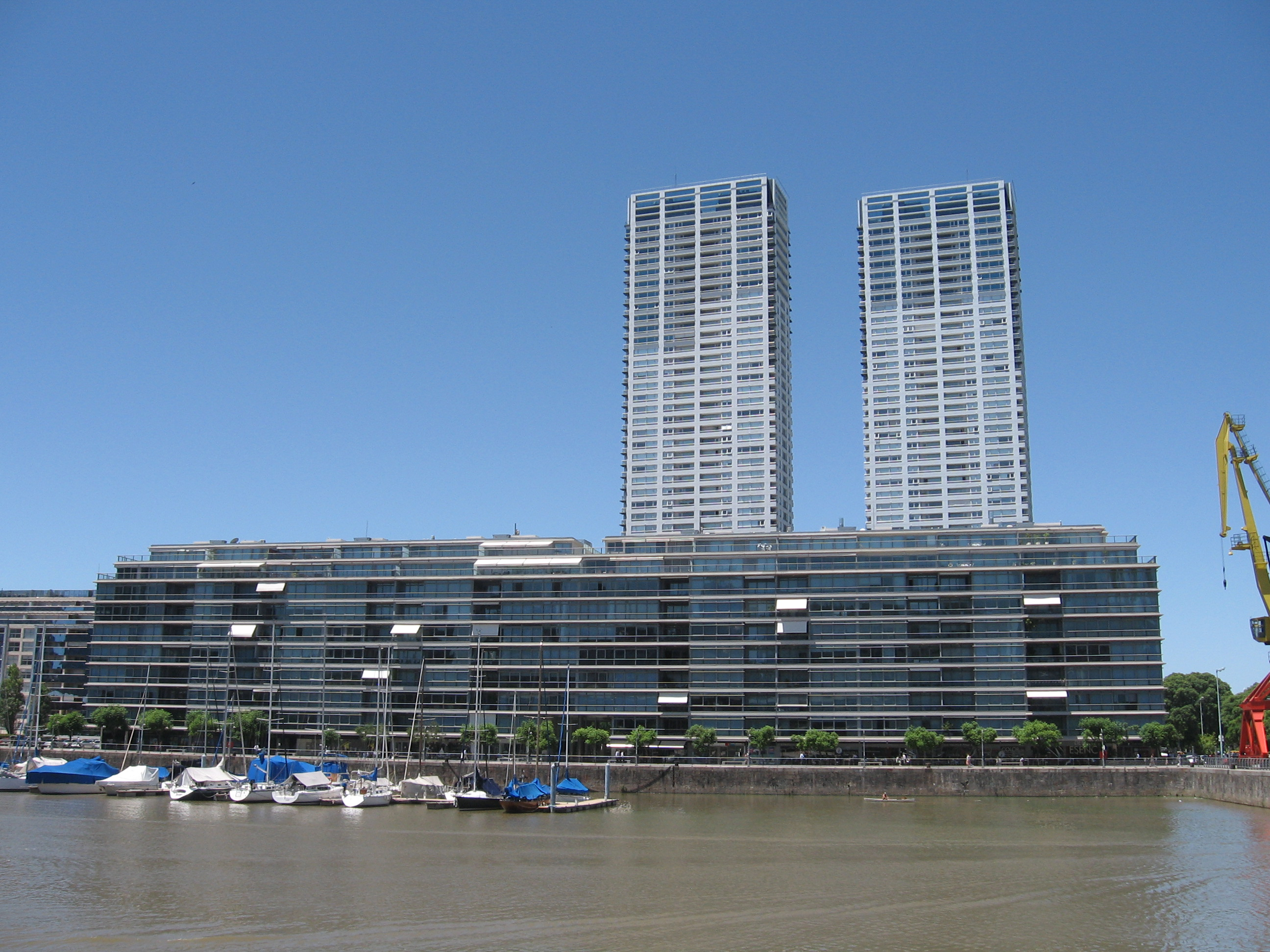
A financial firm located at the Madero Center hotel was the starting point for The Route of the K-Money investigation.

Several high-profile cases took place during the Fernández de Kirchner administration. The first involved the detention of Venezuelan-American businessman Antonini Wilson in an airport after being found with a suitcase filled with $800,000. This money was illegally provided by Petróleos de Venezuela, the state oil company, to be used for her 2007 general election campaign. Details of the case were explained by businessman Carlos Kauffmann and lawyer Moisés Maiónica, who pleaded guilty. The FPV financing of the 2007 elections caused another scandal years later. Three pharmaceutical businessmen, Sebastián Forza, Damián Ferrón, and Leopoldo Bina, were found dead in 2008, a case known as the "Triple Crime". Further investigation of Forza, who contributed $200,000 to the campaign, identified him as a provider of ephedrine to the Sinaloa Cartel. In 2015, Martín Lanatta and José Luis Salerno, convicted for the killings, claimed that Aníbal Fernández was the boss of a mafia ring that ordered those killings to secure the illegal traffic of ephedrine. Fernández denied the charges, maintaining that it was a set-up to undermine his chances in the 2015 general election. General illegal drug trade grew in Argentina during Kirchnerism, and saw Mexican and Colombian syndicates working with Peruvian and Bolivian smugglers. Conviction rates for money laundering were almost nonexistent. Mariano Federici, head of the Financial Information Unit, said that the "magnitude of the threat is very serious, and this would never have been possible without collaboration from government officials in this country".

Amado Boudou, who served as minister of economy during Fernández de Kirchner's first term and vice president during the second, was suspected of corruption in 2012 case. The Ciccone Calcografica printing company filed for bankruptcy in 2010, but this request was cancelled when businessman Alejandro Vandenbroele bought it. The company received tax breaks to pay its debts, and was selected to print banknotes of the Argentine peso. It is suspected that Vandenbroele is actually a frontman for Boudou, and that he employed his clout as minister of economy to benefit a company that actually belonged to him.

In 2013, the TV programme Periodismo para todos launched an investigation in purported political corruption. They named their investigation "The route of the K-Money", to imply that former president Néstor Kirchner and then-president Cristina Fernández de Kirchner were involved. Businessman Leonardo Fariña said in a television interview that he helped businessman Lázaro Báez to divert money from public works, and take it to a financial firm located in the Madero Center luxury hotel. This firm, informally known as "La Rosadita", would have sent the money abroad to tax havens, using shell companies. Given the amounts of money involved, the money was weighed instead of counted to determine the value. Federico Elaskar, owner of the firm, confirmed Fariña's claims in another televised interview. Both of them retracted their statements after the program was aired, but prosecutor José María Campagnoli confirmed their links with Báez. Báez denied any wrongdoing. Campagnoli was suspended as a prosecutor, accused of leaking information, and abusing his authority. Báez is also linked with the Kirchners to the Hotesur case, a suspected case of money laundering. According to a criminal complaint by opposition deputy Margarita Stolbizer, his company Valle Mitre S.A. has rented 1,100 rooms per month, for years, at the Hotesur and Alto Calafate hotels, but without occupying them. These hotels, located in the city of El Calafate, belong to the Kirchners. An official investigation into the events related by the "route of the K-Money" case was launched in 2013. In June 2023, the judicial case looking into possible wrongdoing by Fernández de Kirchner was dismissed after the prosecution failed to produce evidence that she had been involved with any embezzled funds.

=== Human rights policy ===
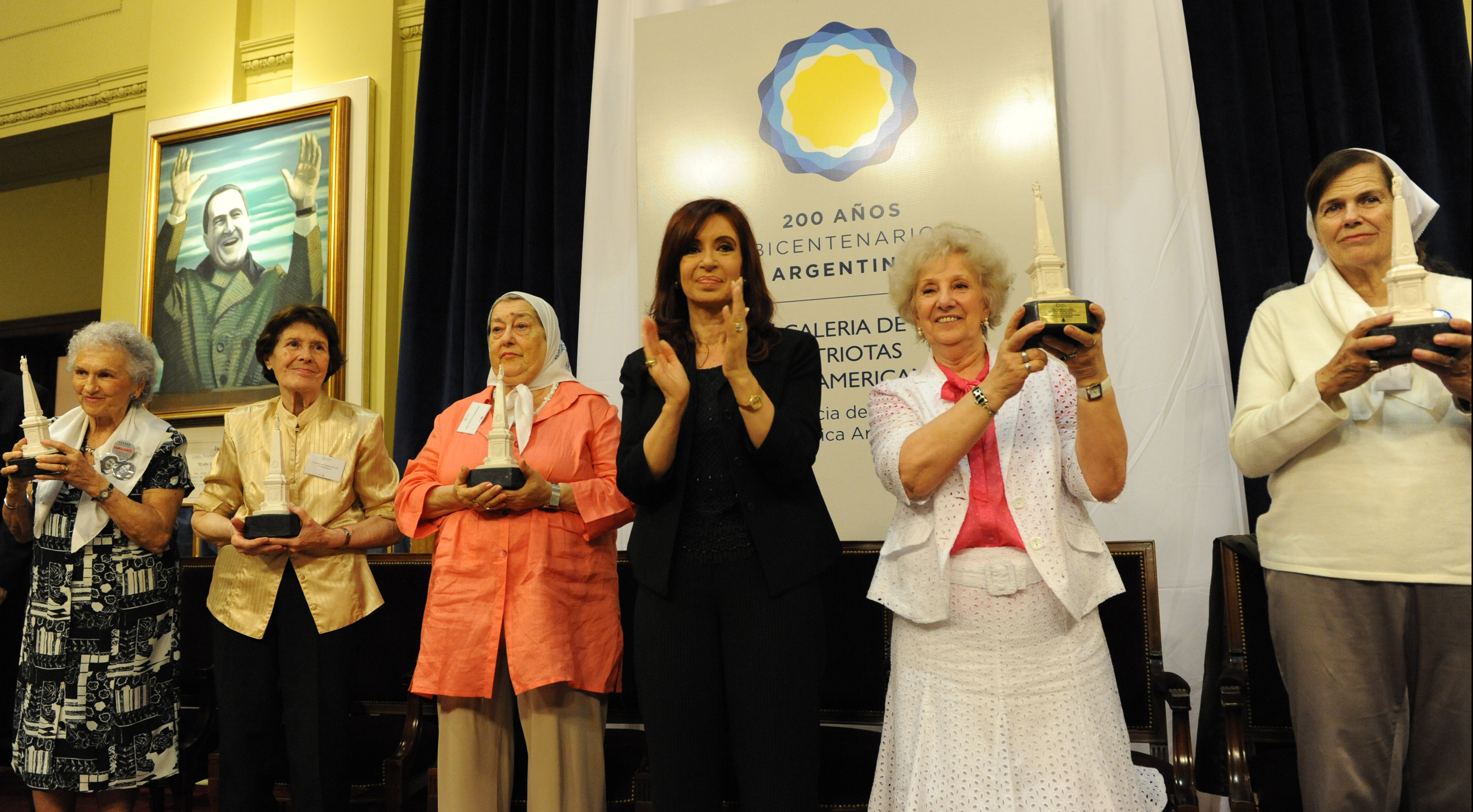
President Cristina Fernández de Kirchner with the Mothers and Grandmothers of the Plaza de Mayo

The Fernández de Kirchner presidency continued the trials of military personnel involved in the Dirty War started by her husband. There have been more than 500 people sentenced, and 1,000 convicted, in a process that was unprecedented in Latin America. De facto president Jorge Rafael Videla, who was convicted and given a life sentence in 1985 and pardoned years later, received a new life sentence in 2010. General Luciano Benjamín Menéndez, who waged war against the leftist guerrillas in the northern Argentine provinces, received a life sentence as well.

Another related investigation involved the fate of the children of captured pregnant guerrillas, who were given up for adoption by the military junta. An estimated 500 children were involved. The investigation became controversial during the Fernández de Kirchner administration, as those involved had become adults and some of them refused to participate in DNA testing. One of those cases was the Noble siblings case, involving the adopted sons of Ernestina Herrera de Noble, owner of the Clarín newspaper. The Kirchners advanced a bill in Congress to make the genetic testing of suspected victims mandatory. Although the measure had popular support, critics considered it a breach of the right to privacy, and politically motivated because of a dispute between her and the Clarín newspaper. The Noble siblings tests in 2011 were negative, and the case was closed in January 2016, after Fernández de Kirchner left the presidency. Hilario Bacca, a confirmed son of disappeared guerrillas, appealed a judicial ruling that sought to change his name, asking to keep the name he had been using.

=== Relationship with the media ===
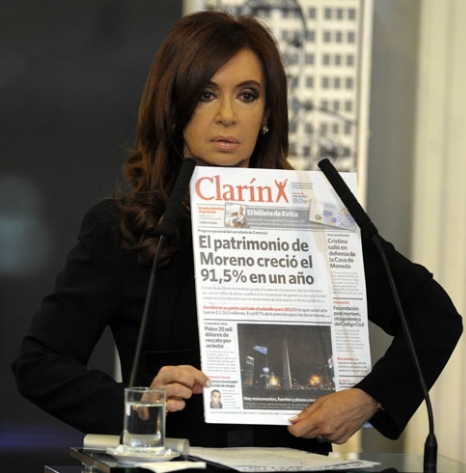
Kirchner holding a copy of Clarín

Football broadcasting was nationalized on the program Fútbol para todos and then filled with pro-government advertisements. On the other hand, the country's largest selling newspaper Clarín, published by the Clarín Group, is not aligned with the government.

The Fernández de Kirchner government launched an illegal campaign against Clarín Group, which included over 450 legal and administrative acts of harassment, as reported by the Global Editors Network. One of those actions was a selective use of state advertising to benefit the media aligned with the government. The government tried to enforce a controversial media law that would see Clarín Group lose licenses and be forced to sell most of its assets. The law was initially sanctioned as a competition law for the media, but critics pointed out that it was only being used to further the campaign against Clarín Group. The government had little interest in enforcing measures of the law that were not related to the Clarín Group. Clarín Group launched a constitutional challenge against some articles of the law with the judiciary. The government released an anti-Clarín advertisement claiming it refused to obey the law and may be subverting democracy. The conflict led to disputes with the judiciary. Minister Julio Alak said that extending an injunction that allowed Clarín Group to keep its assets during the trial would be an insurrection, and it was rumoured that judges who did not rule as the government wished might face impeachment. The court extended the injunction.

She claims that journalistic objectivity does not exist, and that all journalists act on behalf of certain interests. She also justified the lack of press conferences, arguing that it is not important for her administration. Anthony Mills, deputy director of the International Press Institute, compared the harassment against the press in Argentina with cases in Venezuela and Ecuador. He considered it unfortunate that the president disparaged journalism, and pointed out that the freedom of the press may be declining in Argentina.

=== Midterm elections ===
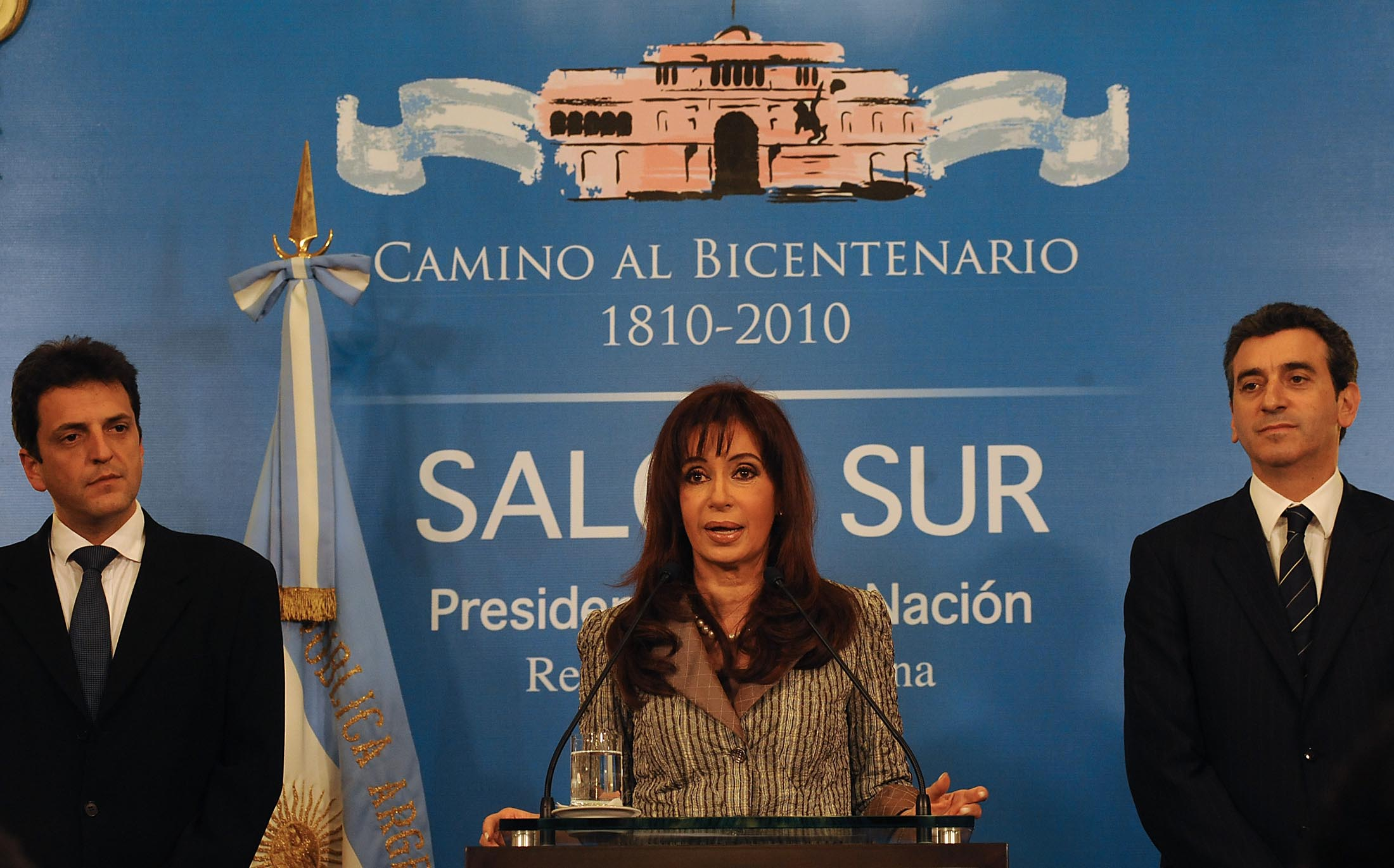
President Kirchner after the defeat at the 2009 midterm elections

The 2009 midterm elections took place a year after the crisis with the farmers. The Kirchners were highly unpopular at the time, and people rejected their policies and governing style. The growing rates of inflation and crime also eroded their public support. Seeking to reverse their declining popularity, Néstor Kirchner led the list for deputy candidates in the Buenos Aires province. He was narrowly defeated by Francisco de Narváez, who led a Peronist faction opposed to the Kirchners. The Kirchners lost the majority of Congress as a result of the election.

The Front for Victory recovered the majority in both chambers of Congress during the 2011 presidential elections, when she was re-elected for a second term. The party had projects to amend the constitution and allow indefinite reelections, but lacked the supermajority required for it. A victory at the 2013 midterm elections would have given such a majority, but the party was defeated in most provinces. Sergio Massa, a former cabinet minister of the Kirchners, won in the Buenos Aires Province by nearly 10 points with his new party, the Renewal Front. Argentina lacked a big opposition party since the collapse of the Radical Civic Union in 2001. Instead, Massa created an alternative party that also stood for Peronism. However, the party still retained a simple majority in Congress. This election was the first one in which teenagers from 16 to 18 could vote. President Fernández de Kirchner, who had undergone brain surgery some weeks before, was hospitalized during the election and unable to join the campaign.

=== Foreign policy ===
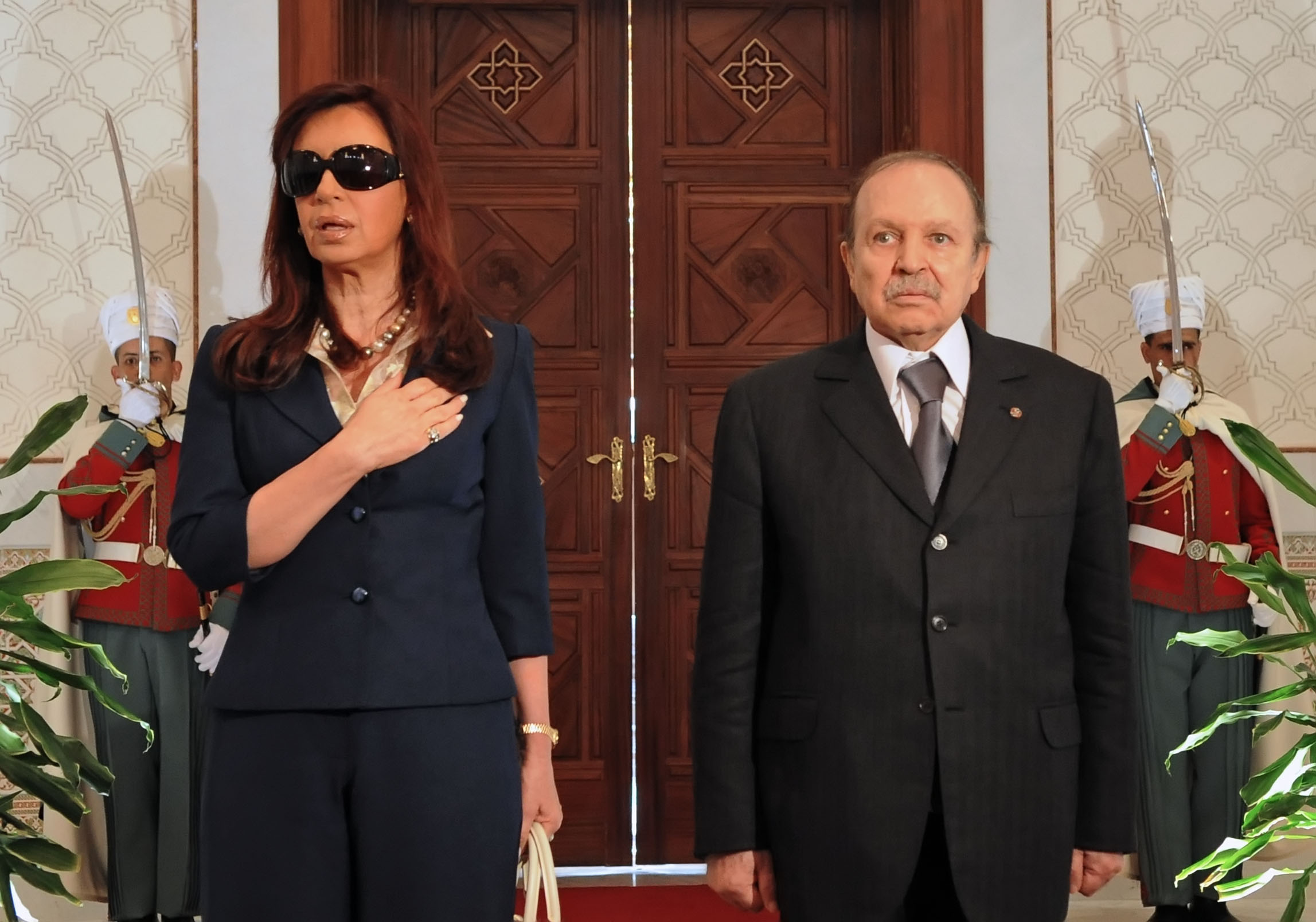
Fernández de Kirchner with Algerian President Abdelaziz Bouteflika in 2008

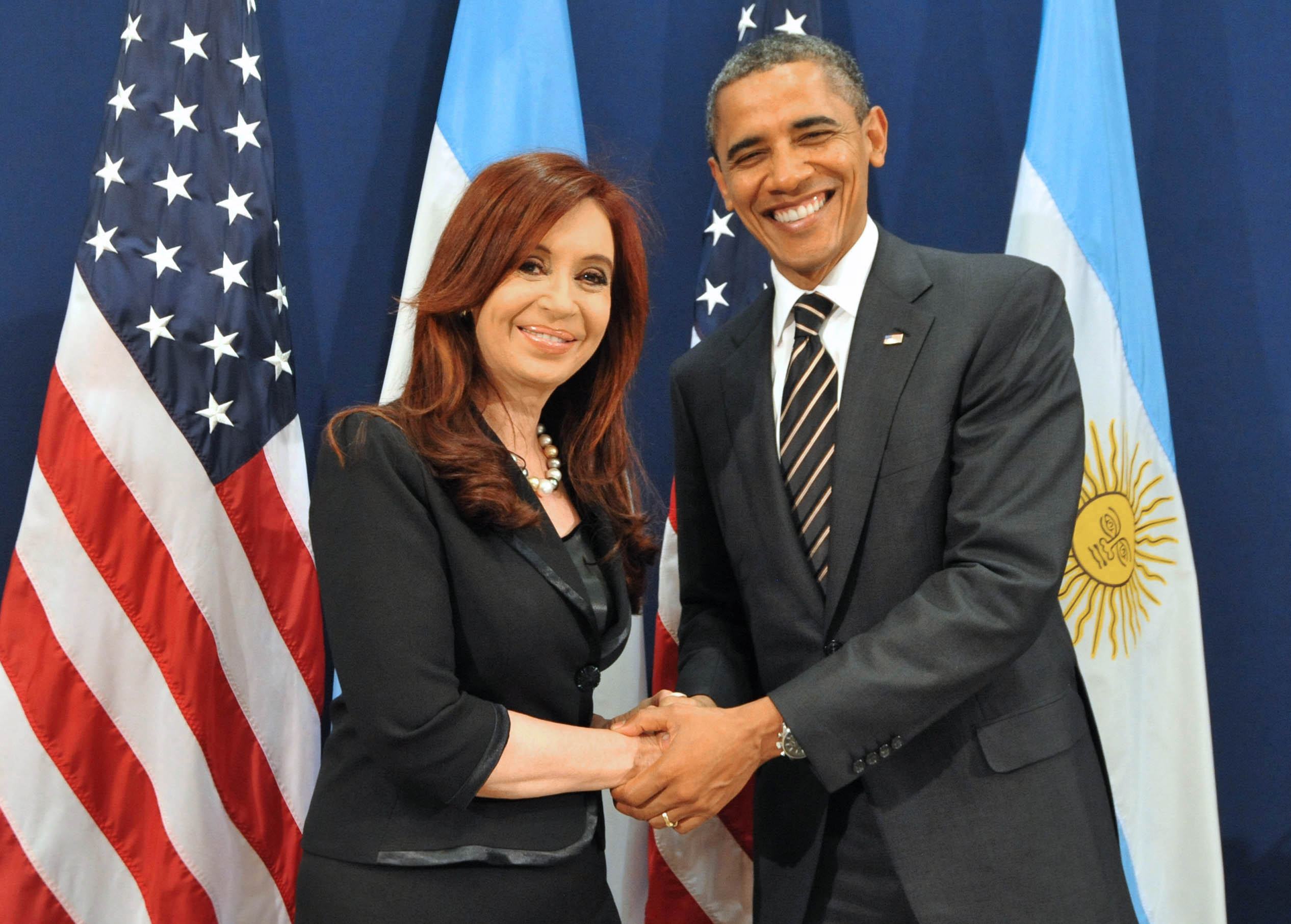
Fernández de Kirchner with U.S. President Barack Obama at the 2011 G20 Cannes summit in 2011

Fernández de Kirchner was part of the "pink tide", a group of populist, left-wing presidents who ruled several Latin American countries in the 2000s. This group included, among others, Néstor and Cristina Kirchner in Argentina, Hugo Chávez and Nicolás Maduro in Venezuela, Luiz Inácio Lula da Silva and Dilma Rousseff in Brazil, Evo Morales in Bolivia and Rafael Correa in Ecuador. She has been an unconditional supporter of Chávez and Maduro. As Paraguay rejected the incorporation of Venezuela into the Mercosur trade bloc, she took advantage of the impeachment of Fernando Lugo to claim that Paraguay had suffered a coup d'état and proposed to temporarily remove the country from the bloc. With the support of the other presidents, Paraguay was removed for a time, and Venezuela was incorporated into the Mercosur. She maintained her support of Venezuela even during the large 2014 Venezuela protests and the imprisonment of its leader, Leopoldo López.

She had a rocky relationship with the United States. Several items from a US Air Force plane, such as drugs and GPS devices, were seized by Argentine officials, which caused a diplomatic crisis. US State Department spokesman Philip J. Crowley said that they were standard tools used in counter-terrorism tactics which were being taught to the Argentine police during the joint operation, and asked for the return of the seized materials. She blamed the whole country for the 2014 default, ruled by US judge Thomas P. Griesa. She said in a cadena nacional ("national network") address that the US may be trying to oust her from power, or even assassinate her. She said this a few days after accusing the Islamic State of Iraq and the Levant of similar assassination plans against her. The idea was rejected by opposition leader Elisa Carrió as a mere conspiracy theory.

The 30th anniversary of the Falklands War was in 2012, and Fernández de Kirchner was increasingly critical of the UK, reiterating the Argentine claims in the Falkland Islands sovereignty dispute. British Prime minister David Cameron rejected her comments. Relations were also strained by recent oil explorations in the area, and she threatened to sue Rockhopper Exploration for it.

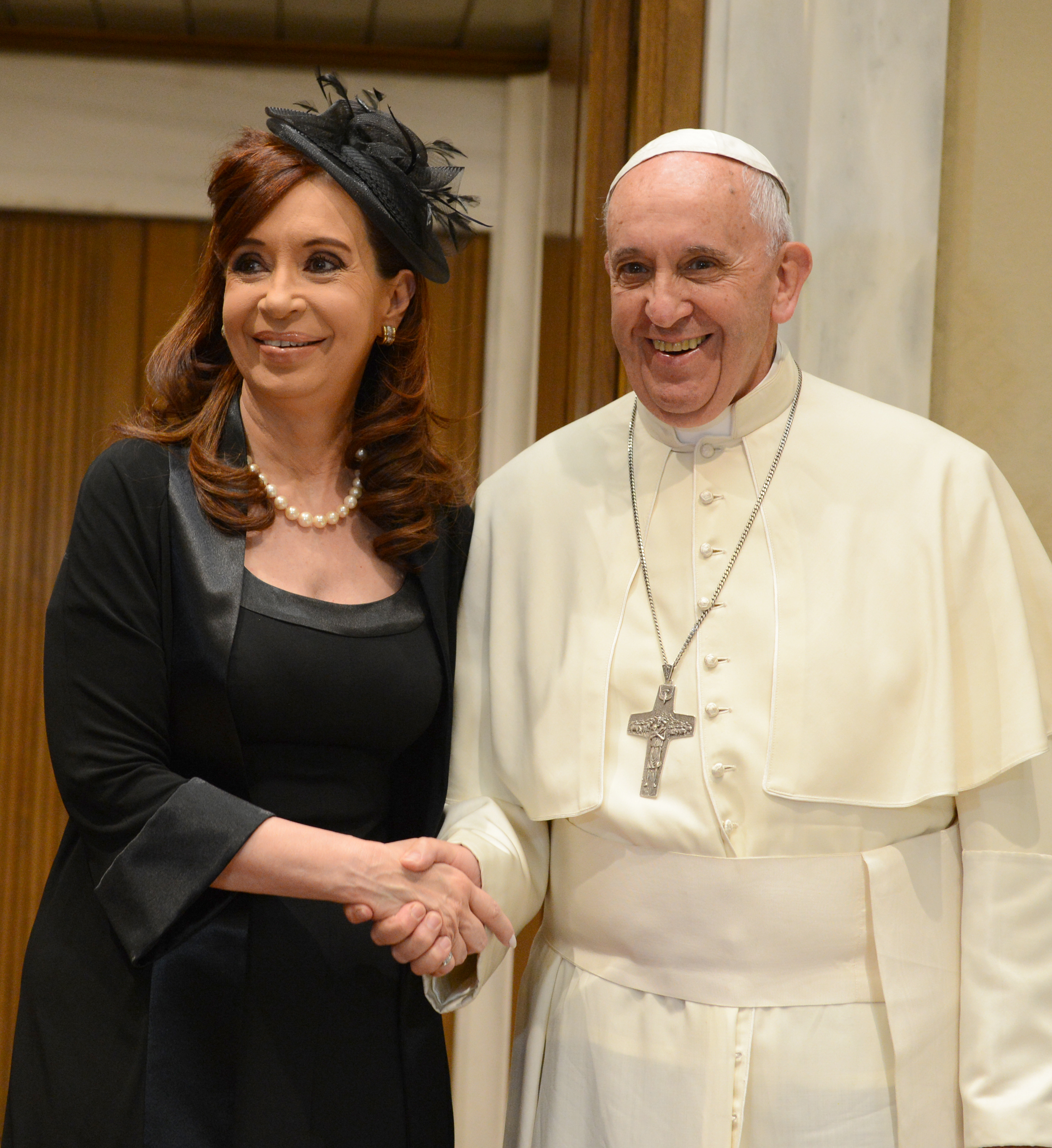
Fernández de Kirchner with Pope Francis in 2015

When Archbishop Jorge Bergoglio was elected as Pope Francis, the initial reactions were mixed. Most of Argentine society cheered it, but the pro-government newspaper Página/12 published renewed allegations about the Dirty War, and the president of the National Library described a global conspiracy theory. The president took more than an hour to congratulate him, and only did so in a passing reference within a routine speech. However, due to the Pope's popularity in Argentina, Fernández de Kirchner made what the political analyst Claudio Fantini called a "Copernican shift" in her relations with him and fully embraced the Francis phenomenon. On the day before his inauguration as pope, Bergoglio, now Francis, had a private meeting with Fernández de Kirchner. They exchanged gifts and lunched together. This was the new pope's first meeting with a head of state, and there was speculation that the two were mending their relations. Página/12 removed their controversial articles about Bergoglio, written by Horacio Verbitsky, from their web page, as a result of this change.

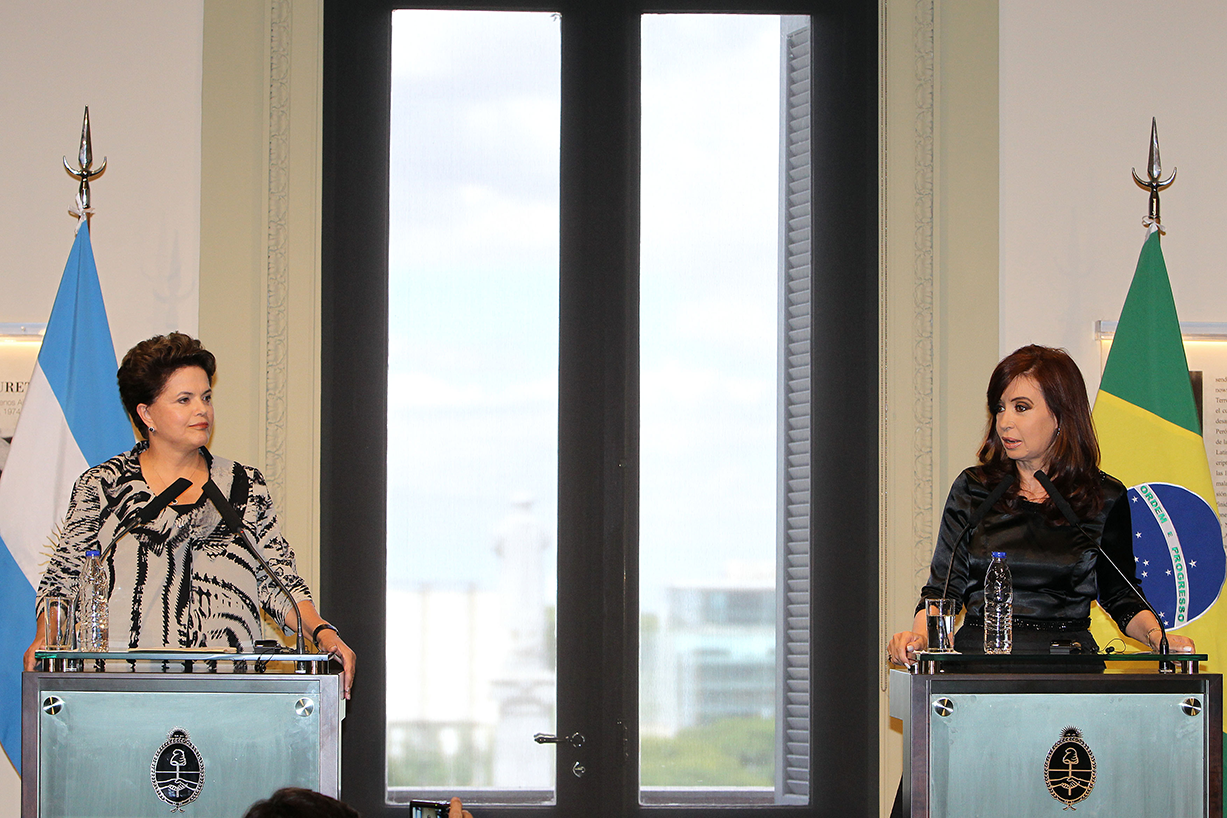
Fernández de Kirchner with Brazilian President Dilma Rousseff in 2011

Argentina suffered a terrorist attack in 1994, the AMIA bombing targeting a Buenos Aires Jewish centre, which killed 85 people and wounded 300. The investigation remained open for years, and prosecutor Alberto Nisman was appointed to the case. He accused Iran of organizing the attack, and the Hezbollah group of carrying it out. He intended to prosecute five Iranian officials, including former Iranian president Akbar Hashemi Rafsanjani, but Argentina signed a memorandum of understanding with Iran for a joint investigation. Nisman accused the president of signing that memorandum for oil and trade benefits, according to hundreds of hours of wiretaps. On 19 January 2015, he was found dead at his home, a day before a congressional hearing to explain his accusation, which caused a great controversy. As of 2016, both the cases of the AMIA bombing and the death of Nisman remain unresolved, and the courts declined at the time to investigate his denunciation of Fernández de Kirchner.

Fernández de Kirchner maintained her positions during several speeches at the United Nations General Assembly (UNGA) during its yearly meetings of September and had a rocky relationship with Iranian President Ahmadinejad. In 2009, Fernández de Kirchner personally asked Iranian President Mahmoud Ahmadinejad to cooperate with the Argentine justice to help bring closure to the AMIA bombing. She pointed the belief of both mandataries in God and condemned Ahmadinejad's denial of the Holocaust as well as other "Western tragedies". In the September 2009 UNGA, she clashed with Ahmadinejad and ordered the Argentine delegation to walk out on Ahmadinejad's speech, denouncing his rhetoric. In return, Iran responded that Argentina's accusations were "unfounded and irresponsible" and denounced the "inept Argentine judicial system and its vulnerabilities to internal and foreign pressures."

== Post-presidency (2015–present) ==
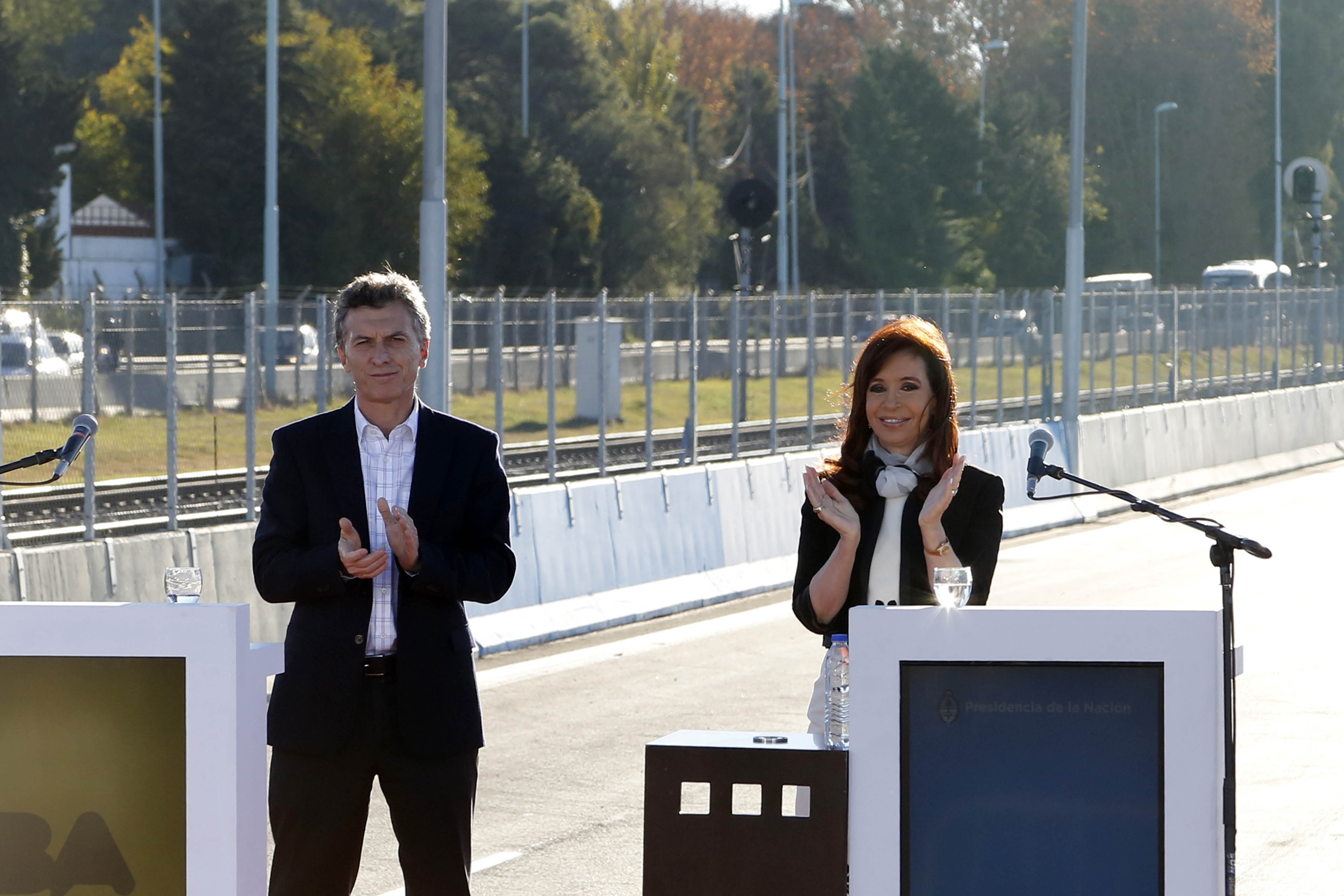
Fernández de Kirchner with then-Buenos Aires Mayor and successor Mauricio Macri in 2014

Mauricio Macri, then-chief of Government of Buenos Aires, was elected president in the 2015 Argentine general election, defeating the Kirchnerist candidate Daniel Scioli in a ballotage. During the transition period, Macri reported that Fernández de Kirchner was creating obstacles and problems in an attempt to undermine his government. She changed the 2016 budget, increasing spending in several areas (including broadcasting rights for football matches), despite the huge fiscal deficit. A number of Kirchnerist officials refused to resign their offices to allow Macri to appoint his own people. Even the handover ceremony became controversial, as she refused to attend it. It was the first time since the end of military rule in 1983 that the outgoing president did not hand over power to the incoming one.

In 2016, she founded a think tank under the name of Patria Institute, intended to centralize her post-presidency activities. She also wrote a book called Sinceramente, which was published in 2019.

=== Senatorial run ===
Both Fernández de Kirchner and her former interior minister Florencio Randazzo wanted to run for senator for the Buenos Aires Province at the 2017 midterm elections. Refusing to run in primary elections, she asked for a shared ticket as a condition to run for senator. Randazzo did not accept the proposal. As both candidates enlisted to run in the general election, the FPV broke apart with the Justicialist Party of Buenos Aires Province backing Randazzo and the rest of the FPV parties backing Fernández de Kirchner; the remaining parties formed the Citizen's Unity (Unidad Ciudadana) coalition. Esteban Bullrich was the candidate of Cambiemos. Fernández de Kirchner won the mandatory primary elections by a slim margin of 0,08%, but lost in the general election 36% to 42%. However, she still took office according to Argentine Senate election procedure where the balloting results in two of the three senate seats being claimed by the party winning the largest vote share, with the second-place finisher claiming the third senate seat.

=== Vice presidency ===
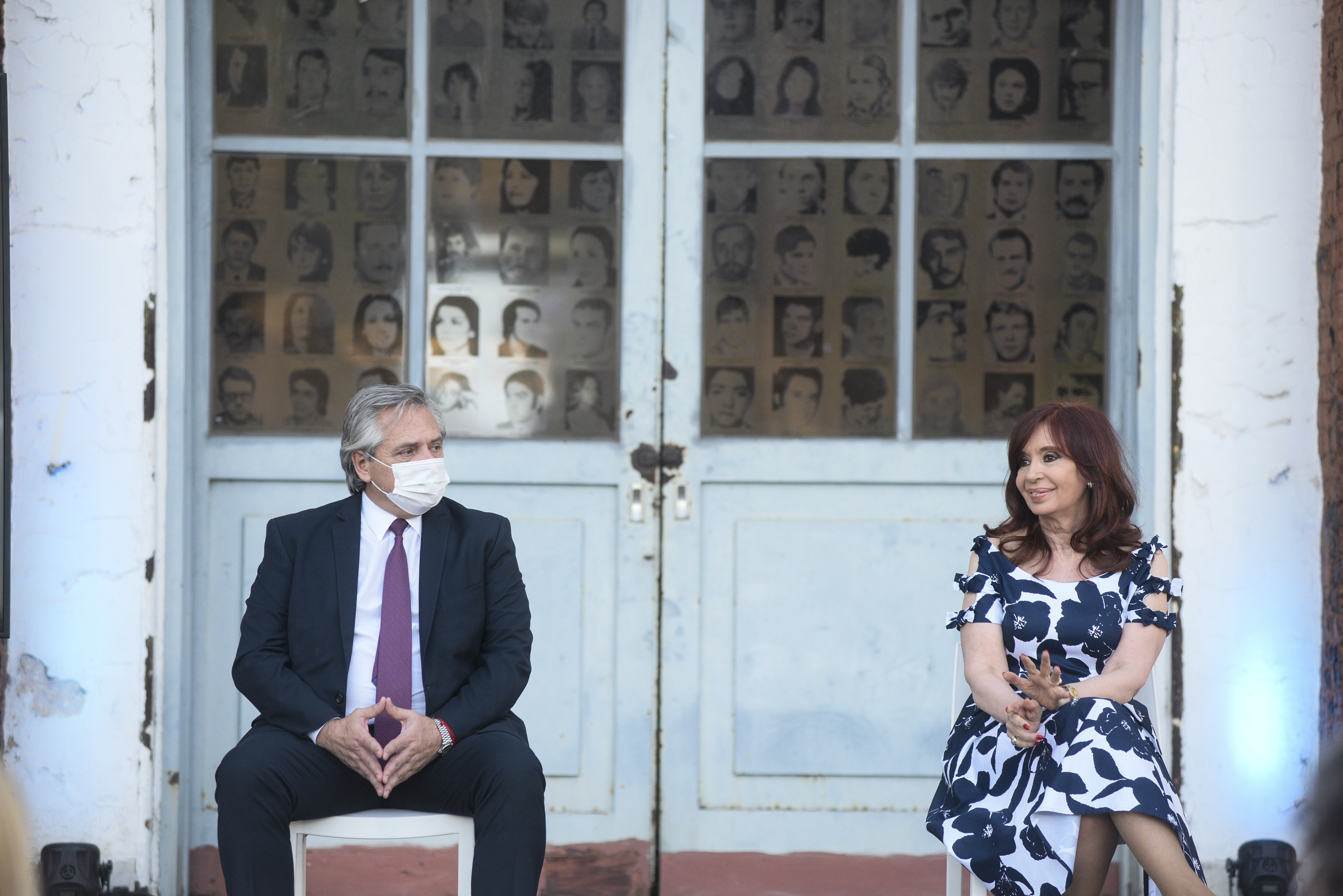
Vice President Cristina Fernández de Kirchner (right) alongside President Alberto Fernández (left) in 2021

On 27 October 2019, Cristina Fernández de Kirchner was elected vice president, making her the first former head of state to assume the Argentine vice presidency. She was the running mate of Alberto Fernández—unrelated to her, who was elected president. She resigned from the Senate on 27 November 2019 after assuming the vice presidency, and was replaced by her former foreign minister Jorge Taiana.

=== Legal charges ===
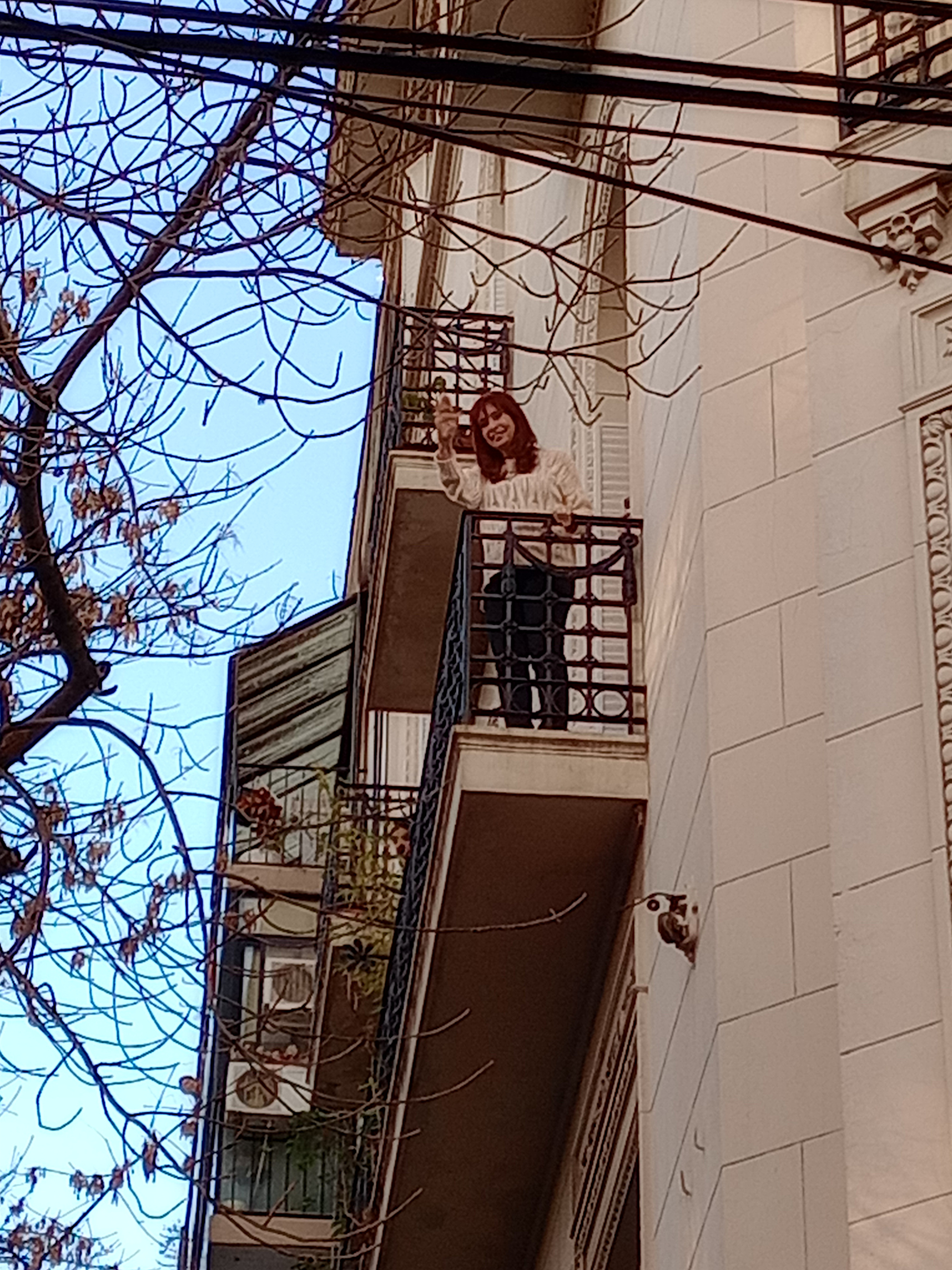
Fernández de Kirchner waving to her supporters at San José 1111, during her house arrest since June 17, 2025

Fernández de Kirchner has faced several charges in court after leaving office in 2015. One of those concerned the sale of dollar futures at very low prices near the end of her term. This became a problem during Macri's presidency. The operation was carried out by the Central Bank, but judge Claudio Bonadio believes Fernández de Kirchner was the instigator. She is also being investigated in the Road infrastructure case. About US$1 million of her assets was frozen while Bonadio investigated the case. She took advantage of the hearing to organize her first political rally since leaving office. Lázaro Báez, a businessman who had close ties with the Kirchners, was detained in April 2016 as it was suspected that he might flee escape. José López, an official from the ministry of public works, was detained while trying to hide bags filled with millions in cash at a monastery. In December 2016, Federal Judge Julián Ercolini ordered the freezing of US$633 million of Fernández de Kirchner's assets and approved charges of illicit association and fraudulent administration against her.

The case presented by Nisman was finally opened for investigation in December 2016. In December 2017, Judge Bonadio indicted her and charged her with high treason. However, as a sitting senator, she enjoyed immunity from prosecution. In March 2018, Fernández de Kirchner was indicted for obstructing investigation into the 1994 AMIA bombing, which killed 85 people, with her allegedly making a deal with the Iranian government to stop investigating Iranian officials who may have been involved in the attack in exchange for better prices on Iranian oil and other products. Human Rights Watch claims, based mainly on reports and testimonies made by former secretary-general of Interpol Ronald Noble, that these charges have no grounds. Noble refuted the claim of cover-up made by Judge Bonadio, calling the judge's report "false, misleading and incomplete". In April 2021, Fernández de Kirchner's lawyers anticipated that they will ask for the cause against her regarding the memorandum of understanding between Argentina and Iran to be nullified, alleging that two different judges visited former President Macri at the time, which would suggest a conflict of interest. In December 2024, the Supreme Court rejected the defense's request and confirmed that Fernández de Kirchner will have a trial for the case of the memorandum with Iran.

In December 2022, the Court of First Instance found Fernández de Kirchner guilty of "fraudulent administration" over the awarding of a public works contract to Báez. The court sentenced Fernández de Kirchner to six years in prison and a lifetime ban from holding public office for corruption. She had temporary immunity and was able to remain free due to her role as a vice president and could appeal the verdict. She denied the allegations against her and stated that she would not run for reelection in 2023. In November 2024, a federal appeals court in Buenos Aires upheld the guilty verdict and sentence. On 10 June 2025, the Supreme Court upheld Fernández de Kirchner's six-year imprisonment and a lifetime ban from public office. She was allowed to serve her sentence at her private residence. In November 2025, a federal court ordered the forfeiture of nearly $500 million in assets and properties from Fernández de Kirchner and several relatives and associates.

In March 2025, the United States Department of State imposed an entry ban on Fernández de Kirchner and her former planning minister Julio de Vido for "significant corruption" while they were in office.

== Personal life ==
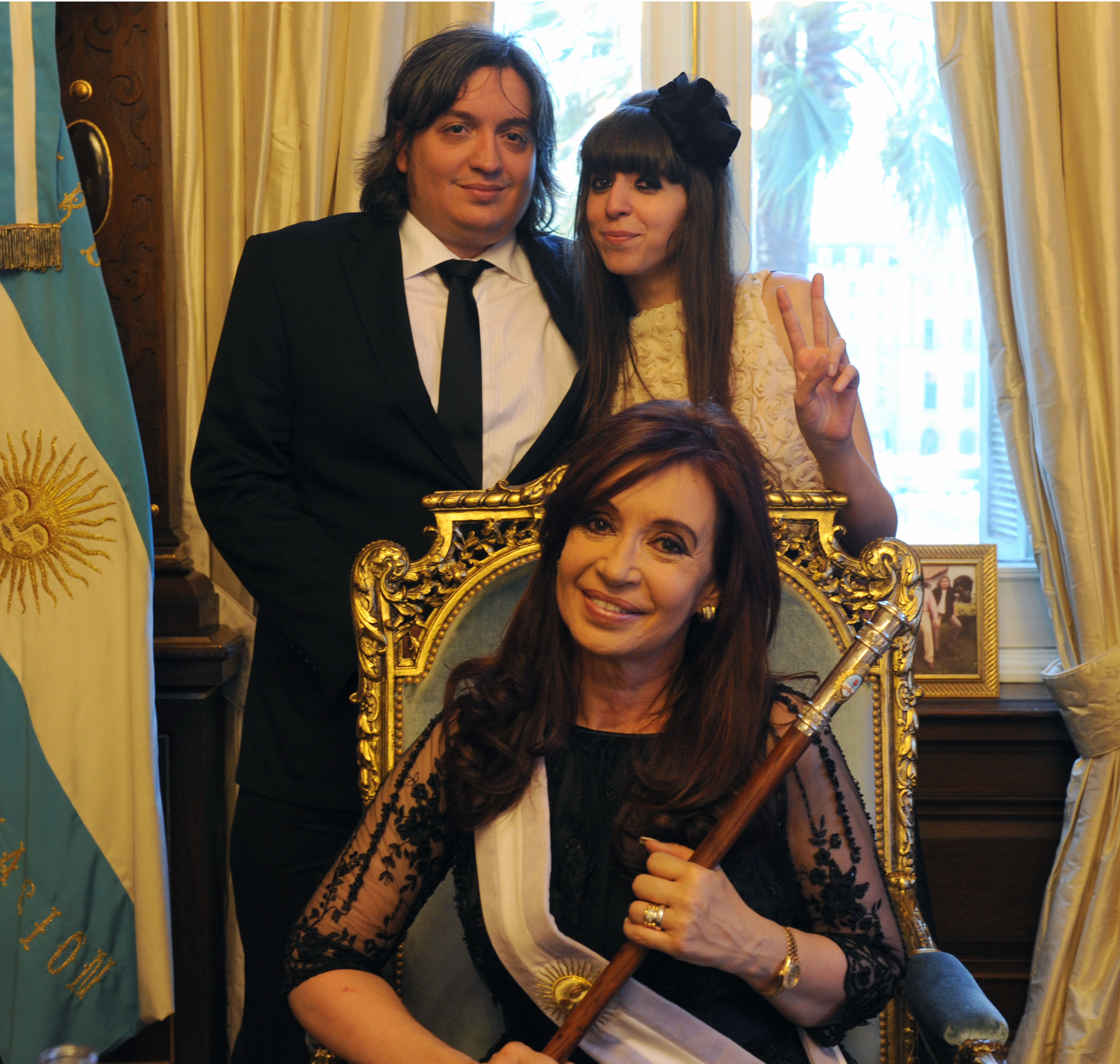
President Cristina Fernández de Kirchner in presidential regalia posing with her children, Máximo and Florencia in 2011

In 1973, during her studies at the National University of La Plata, she met her future spouse, Néstor Kirchner. They were married on 9 May 1975 and had two children: Máximo (born 1977, currently serving as National Deputy for Buenos Aires Province and the leader for Frente de Todos in the chamber) and Florencia (born 1990). Néstor Kirchner died on 27 October 2010 after suffering a heart attack. Following the death of her husband, she dressed in black for over three years.

=== Health ===
Fernández de Kirchner's health first became a topic of public concern in 2005 when Noticias magazine reported that she might have bipolar disorder. Journalist Franco Lindner interviewed the psychiatrist who treated her without revealing his name. Journalist Nelson Castro investigated further and discovered that the psychiatrist was Alejandro Lagomarsino, who died in 2011. Lagomarsino was the leading specialist in the treatment of bipolar disorder in Argentina.

Castro's investigation revealed that Fernández de Kirchner was treated by Lagomarsino for a short period. He could not determine the length of her treatment or the medicine she received, or whether another psychiatrist continued treating her or not. Castro considers that some of her outlandish phrases or projects, and her frequent periods of hiding from public view, may be explained by the disorder's periods of mania and depression, as well as being a regular political strategy. Eduardo Duhalde said that Néstor Kirchner once confided in him that she had a bipolar disorder, while she was having a violent outburst.

During the United States diplomatic cables leak it was revealed that Hillary Clinton questioned Fernández de Kirchner's mental health and asked the US embassy whether she was receiving treatment or not; she later apologized to Fernández de Kirchner for those leaks. She said in her book La Presidenta that it was all a misunderstanding; it is her sister who has bipolar disorder.

On 27 December 2011, presidential spokesman Alfredo Scoccimaro announced that Fernández de Kirchner had been diagnosed with thyroid cancer on 22 December and that she would undergo surgery on 4 January 2012. The standard procedure in these operations is to expose the thyroid gland so that a pathologist can take a sample, analyze it looking for carcinogenic cells, and then decide whether it needs to be removed. In her case, this step was omitted, and the gland was removed directly. After the operation, it was revealed that she had been misdiagnosed and did not have cancer. On 5 October 2013, doctors ordered Fernández de Kirchner to rest for a month after they found blood on her brain caused by a head injury she received on 8 August 2012. She was re-admitted to hospital and had successful surgery on 8 October 2013 to remove blood from under a membrane covering her brain.

On 4 November 2021, Fernández de Kirchner was admitted at the Santorio Otamendi after doctors found out that she had a uterine polyp and had to undergo hysterectomy. On 6 November 2021, she was later discharged after a successful surgery. On 21 December 2025, Fernández de Kirchner was admitted to the Otamendi Sanatorium in Buenos Aires after experiencing severe abdominal pain. She immediately underwent emergency laparoscopic surgery for acute appendicitis with localized peritonitis. Two weeks later on 3 January 2026, Fernández de Kirchner recovered and was subsequently discharged from the hospital.

=== Assassination attempt ===
On 1 September 2022, a man attempted to assassinate Cristina Fernández de Kirchner, the vice president and former president of Argentina. The assailant approached Fernández de Kirchner as she met with supporters outside of her official residence in Recoleta, Buenos Aires, and attempted to shoot her in the head with a semi-automatic pistol. The pistol failed to fire, and the suspect was immediately arrested on scene. Police arrested Fernando André Sabag Montiel, a 35-year-old Brazilian man who has lived in Argentina since 1993. He was tried for attempted homicide, and was convicted on 8 October 2025. He was sentenced to 10 years' imprisonment.

== Electoral history ==
=== Executive ===
Electoral history of Cristina Fernández de Kirchner
Election	Office	List	Votes			Result	Ref.
Election	Office	List	Total	%	P.	Result	Ref.
2007	President of Argentina	Front for Victory	8,652,293	45.28%	1st	Elected	
2011	President of Argentina	Front for Victory	11,865,055	54.11%	1st	Elected	
2019	Vice President of Argentina	Frente de Todos	12,946,037	48.24%	1st	Elected	

=== Legislative ===
Electoral history of Cristina Fernández de Kirchner
Election	Office	List	#	District	Votes			Result	Ref.
Election	Office	List	#	District	Total	%	P.	Result	Ref.
1989	Provincial Deputy	Santa Cruz Victory Front	1	Santa Cruz Province	11.969	36.81%	1st (Note: Presented on an electoral list. The data shown represents the share of the vote the entire party/alliance received in that constituency.)	Elected	
1993	Provincial Deputy	Santa Cruz Victory Front	1	Santa Cruz Province	26,877	69.32%	1st	Elected	
1997	National Deputy	Justicialist Party	1	Santa Cruz Province	46,885	59.69%	1st	Elected	
2001	National Senator	Justicialist Party	1	Santa Cruz Province	52,499	61.91%	1st	Elected	
2005	National Senator	Justicialist Party	1	Buenos Aires Province	3,056,572	45.77%	1st	Elected	
2017	National Senator	Unidad Ciudadana	1	Buenos Aires Province	3,529,900	37.31%	2nd	Elected	

== Ancestry ==
Ancestors of Cristina Fernández de Kirchner

8. Francisco Fernández de O Campo; b. Spain
4. Pascasio Fernández Gómez; b. 27 February 1862 A Fonsagrada, Galicia, Spain
9. Isabel Gómez Díaz; b. Spain
2. Eduardo Fernández; b. 1921 Argentina
10. José Antonio Fernández Murias; b. Spain
5. Amparo Fernández; b. Asturias, Spain
11. Manuela Saavedra; b. Spain
1. Cristina Fernández de Kirchner; b. 19 February 1953 La Plata, Buenos Aires, Argentina
12. Carlos Paz Wilhelm; b. 1860 Argentina
6. Carlos Nemesio Wilhelm; b. 31 October 1898 La Plata, Argentina
13. Carlota Eloísa Gutiérrez; b. 4 November 1860 Buenos Aires, Argentina
3. Ofelia Esther Wilhelm; b. circa 1930 Argentina
14. Francisco Pulido Bernal; b. Spain
7. María Vicenta Pulido; b. Pehuajó, Argentina
15. Clementina Plaza; b. Spain

== Honours ==
=== Foreign honours ===
Ribbon	Distinction	Country	Date	Ref.
	Collar of the Order of the Aztec Eagle	Mexico	24 November 2008	
	Knight of the Collar of the Order of Isabella the Catholic	Spain	6 February 2009	
	Golden Key of Madrid	Spain	9 February 2009	
	Collar of the Order of Merit	Chile	29 October 2009	
	Grand Cross with Diamonds of the Order of the Sun of Peru	Peru	22 March 2010	
	Grand Collar of the Order of the Condor of the Andes	Ecuador	26 March 2010	
	Grand Collar of the Order of the Southern Cross	Brazil	17 July 2015	
	Order of the Star of Palestine	Palestine	12 August 2015	
	Manuela Sáenz Medal of the National Assembly	Ecuador	29 September 2016	

Coat of arms of Cristina Fernández de Kirchner as a member of the Order of Isabella the Catholic

=== Honorary degrees ===
- China: Honorary Doctorate from the University of International Business and Economics, 12 July 2010
- Argentina: Honorary Doctorate from the National University of La Plata, 9 April 2014
- Argentina: Honorary Doctorate from the National University of Quilmes, 12 October 2016
- Argentina: Honorary Doctorate from the National University of Lanús, 3 December 2016
- Argentina: Honorary Doctorate from the National University of the Chaco Austral, 6 May 2022
- Argentina: Honorary Doctorate from the National University of Río Negro, 10 March 2023
- Argentina: Honorary Doctorate from the National University of the West, 13 September 2024

== Notes ==
Honorary titles
Preceded by Sofía Vicic de Ceperníc	First Lady of Río Gallegos; 1987–1991	Succeeded by Eva María Henríquez de Martínez
Preceded by Marta Arana de García	First Lady of Santa Cruz; 1991–2003	Succeeded by María Gloria Ros de Icazuriaga
Preceded by Hilda González de Duhalde	First Lady of Argentina; 2003–2007	Succeeded by Néstor Kirchner as First Gentleman
Party political offices
Preceded by Néstor Kirchner	Justicialist Party nominee for President of Argentina; 2007, 2011	Succeeded by Daniel Scioli
Preceded by Néstor Kirchner	Front for Victory nominee for President of Argentina; 2007, 2011	Succeeded by Daniel Scioli
Preceded by Carlos Zannini	Justicialist Party nominee for Vice President of Argentina; 2019	Succeeded by Agustín Rossi
New political alliance	Frente de Todos nominee for Vice President of Argentina; 2019	Alliance dissolved
Political offices
Preceded by Néstor Kirchner	President of Argentina; 2007–2015	Succeeded by Mauricio Macri
Preceded by Gabriela Michetti	Vice President of Argentina; 2019–2023	Succeeded by Victoria Villarruel
