= September 2012 cacerolazo in Argentina =

2012 anti-government protest against Cristina Fernández de Kirchner in September

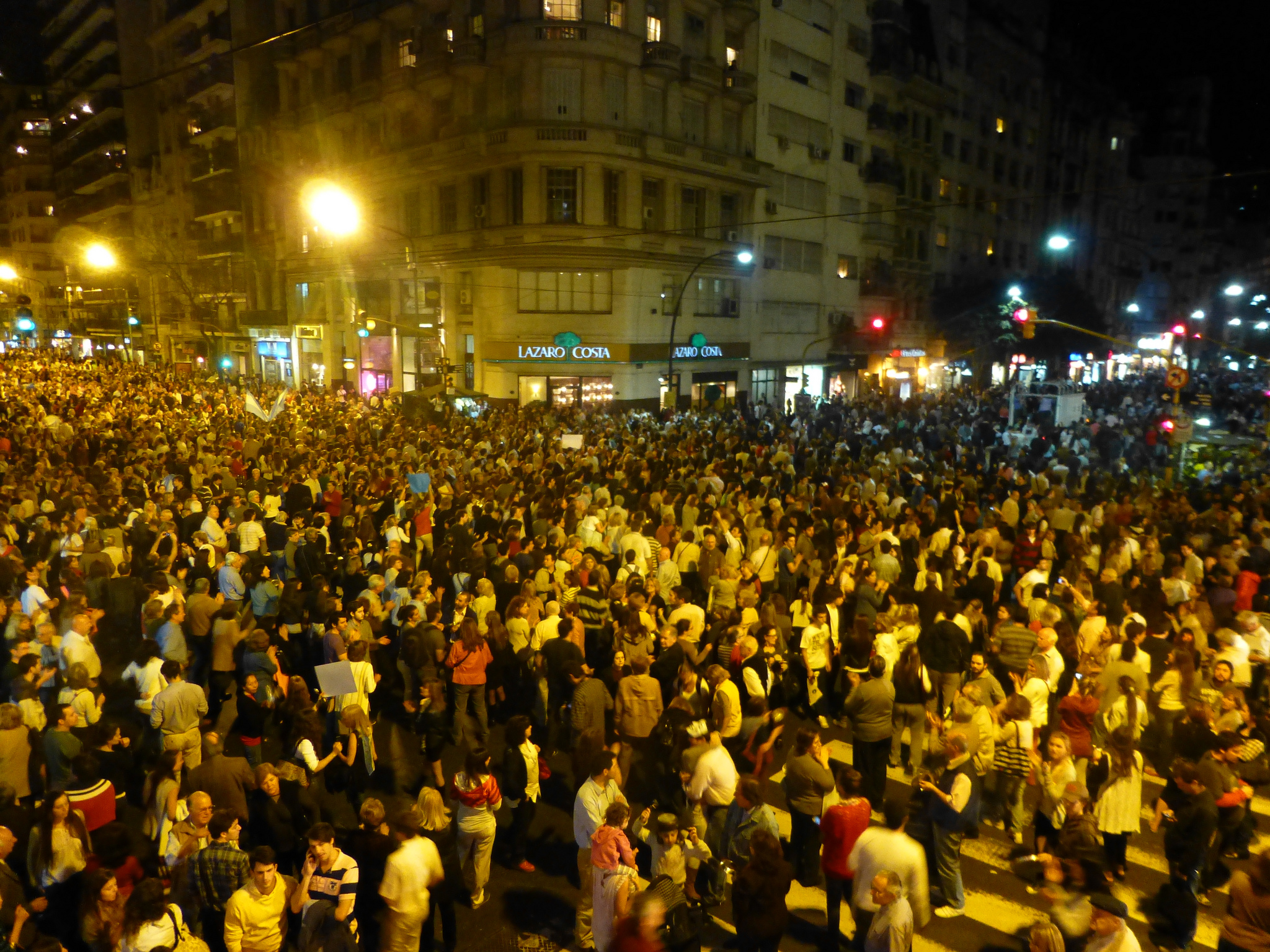
- Demonstration at Santa Fe and Callao streets, Buenos Aires
- Date: September 13, 2012
- Location: Argentina

A number of cacerolazos, pot-banging protests, took place in several cities of Argentina on September 13 and November 8, 2012. The first, in September 13, was a national protest against the policies of the president Cristina Fernández de Kirchner. The protests generated significant repercussions in local politics. The second, on November 8 (known as 8N), was another much more massive protest in several cities in Argentina, including Buenos Aires, Córdoba, Rosario, Mendoza, Olivos, among many others throughout Greater Buenos Aires and other regions. There were also protests in Argentine embassies and consulates in cities such as New York, Miami, Madrid, Sydney, Bogotá, Santiago and Barcelona, among others. Its complaints were almost the same, but the difference in size was very big. The protests are considered not only a call to Kirchnerism, but also to the opposition, because they did not have a strong leader.

== Antecedents ==
Cristina Fernández de Kirchner was re-elected in 2011, by 54% of the vote in a general election. After it, the government instituted a period of fiscal austerity which has severely impacted the economy. Inflation increased to more than 25% annually, but the income tax was not adjusted accordingly, which led to a demonstration by unionist Hugo Moyano. The government imposed arbitrary trade barriers and forbade the acquisition of foreign currency, generating a black market in it. As the government denies the inflation through the manipulation of the INDEC statistics, huge amounts of $100 banknotes, the largest denomination in circulation, were printed, instead of creating a banknote of a higher value. This renewed the Boudougate, a political controversy involving the vice president Amado Boudou and the printing house appointed to print the banknotes.

At the political level, President Kirchner is not allowed to run for a new mandate in 2015 and the Front for Victory has no other likely candidates, instead promoting an amendment to the Constitution of Argentina to allow indefinite reelections. This proposal is resisted by all the other political parties. Relations between Kirchnerism and the press worsened, with several attacks to the newspapers not aligned with the government. President Kirchner had also said to her cabinet that "you should be afraid of God, and a bit afraid of me", which was not well received either. The 2012 Buenos Aires rail disaster, the crime levels and the lack of respect for republican institutions were also invoked as causes for the protest.

== The event ==
The demonstration was called for September 13 at 20:00. It was organized through social networks, without the intervention of political parties. Many people were already present at the intersection of Santa Fe and Callao Streets in Buenos Aires at 19:30, and most of them gathered at Plaza de Mayo at 21:00. The main crowd eventually numbered almost 200,000 people. Hundreds of people protested at the Quinta de Olivos, the official residence of the president, even though Kirchner was not present at the time.

Similar protests took place in other cities of Argentina, next to their important places. Twenty thousand people in Córdoba gathered next to the Patio Olmos, increasing the number of previous demonstrations. In Rosario the people protested next to the National Flag Memorial. The Civic Center of San Carlos de Bariloche and the intersection of San Martín and Sarmiento in Mendoza attracted the local protesters. Posadas, with 2,000 protesters, had the first notable demonstration against the Kirchners. Salta had a demonstration of nearly 1,000 protesters.

=== Repercussions ===
==== Media ====
Nearly 80% of the Argentine media at the time were controlled by the government (directly in the cases of state-owned media, or indirectly in the cases of media which publish advertising paid by the government). The official media refused to broadcast the protest at 20:00, some of then began to do it at 22:00. The Televisión Pública (Spanish: Public television) TV channel broadcast a documentary film, and C5N filmed streets with few people. Todo Noticias, which is not aligned with the government, broadcast the protest the whole night, with a notable boost in the points of rating.

==== Politics ====
Government politicians disparaged the protest, minimizing its significance, and the president said that she would not get nervous about it. Mayor Mauricio Macri requested her to acknowledge the protest and listen to the people's demands.

== See also ==
- 8N
- List of protests in the 21st century
