= Hotesur case =

Case of alleged political corruption in Argentina in 2014

The Hotesur case broke out in Argentina in 2014. Hotesur is a firm that administers the hotels in El Calafate that belong to Cristina Fernández de Kirchner and her family. Initially, it was suspected of not paying taxes, but the investigation headed by judge Claudio Bonadio led to suspicions about a possible case of money laundering, involving the businessman Lázaro Báez as well. As a result, the government attempted to force an impeachment of Bonadio.

== Investigation ==
The case began with an investigation by Periodismo para todos, a TV program of investigative journalism led by Jorge Lanata, aired on November 9, 2014. Lanata revealed that Hotesur, a firm owned by the president Cristina Fernández de Kirchner to manage her hotels in Alto Calafate, had not paid taxes to the IGJ, nor filed the required financial statements for years. The program checked as well the registered headquarters of Hotesur, which appeared to be empty. Deputy Margarita Stolbizer made a formal denouncement to the judiciary the following day about the information revealed in the program. She also pointed out that Valle Mitre S.A., a firm owned by Lázaro Báez, rented more than 1,100 rooms per month at Alto Calafate, but such rooms stayed unoccupied. Báez has earned hundreds of millions with infrastructure contracts signed with the Kirchners, and is suspected of money laundering at The Route of the K-Money scandal. Stolbizer also accused Cristina Fernández of malfeasance in office.

Judge Claudio Bonadio ordered a search and seizure at the registered headquarters on November 20 and confirmed that the place was abandoned. Hotesur confirmed later that they had not filed statements, but did not mention the unoccupied rentals. Although Hotesur is not state-owned, their message was delivered by both media aligned with the government (such as Telam and Fútbol para todos) and the official Facebook and Twitter accounts of the presidency of the nation.

== Actions against the denouncers ==
The main strategy of the government against the scandal was to start a big number of collateral scandals, expecting that the public interest in the original case would decrease, or that it would turn into a public perception of the whole political world as corrupt, instead of just the specific politicians involved in cases of corruption.

The Council of Magistracy of the Nation reduced Bonadio's wages by 30%, with the vote of the supporters of the government within the council. He was sanctioned because of delays in two old cases. Bonadio may be impeached if he gets three sanctions. The opposing votes considered that the Council had not ruled over the delays in three years and that the case against Bonadio had expired because of the statute of limitations.

The lawyer Santiago Mansilla accused Margarita Stolbizer of illicit enrichment, a few days after she denounced the case. The case was received by Judge Marcelo Martínez de Giorgi, and the prosecutor Ramiro González asked for her oath to the AFIP to decide if he should proceed with the case.

Silvina Martínez, a witness in the case, has also been denounced of several crimes by deputy Andrea García.

The AFIP denounced the bank HSBC for 4040 secret illegal Swiss accounts, as part of the strategy to generate collateral scandals.

== Reactions ==
The president accused Claudio Bonadio of a similar fault, claiming that he has a stake in a company that had not filed statements in due time either. Luis D'Elia proposed to place Bonadio's head on a pike, in front of the courthouse. Deputy Carlos Kunkel and the chief of cabinet Jorge Capitanich said that Bonadio was attempting a coup d'état; such conspiracy theories are usual in the Kirchnerite speech.

Luis María Cabral, president of a national judges association, supported Bonadio.

Luis Barrionuevo, head of the gastronomic union, announced that he would donate money to Bonadio to compensate for the reduction of 30% of his wages. He mentioned that there are employees in Alto Calafate that belong to his union, who may testify in the case if needed. He mentioned that the hotels were reported to be fully occupied even during the Patagonian crisis with volcanic ash.
