= Madero Center =

Hotel in Buenos Aires, Argentina

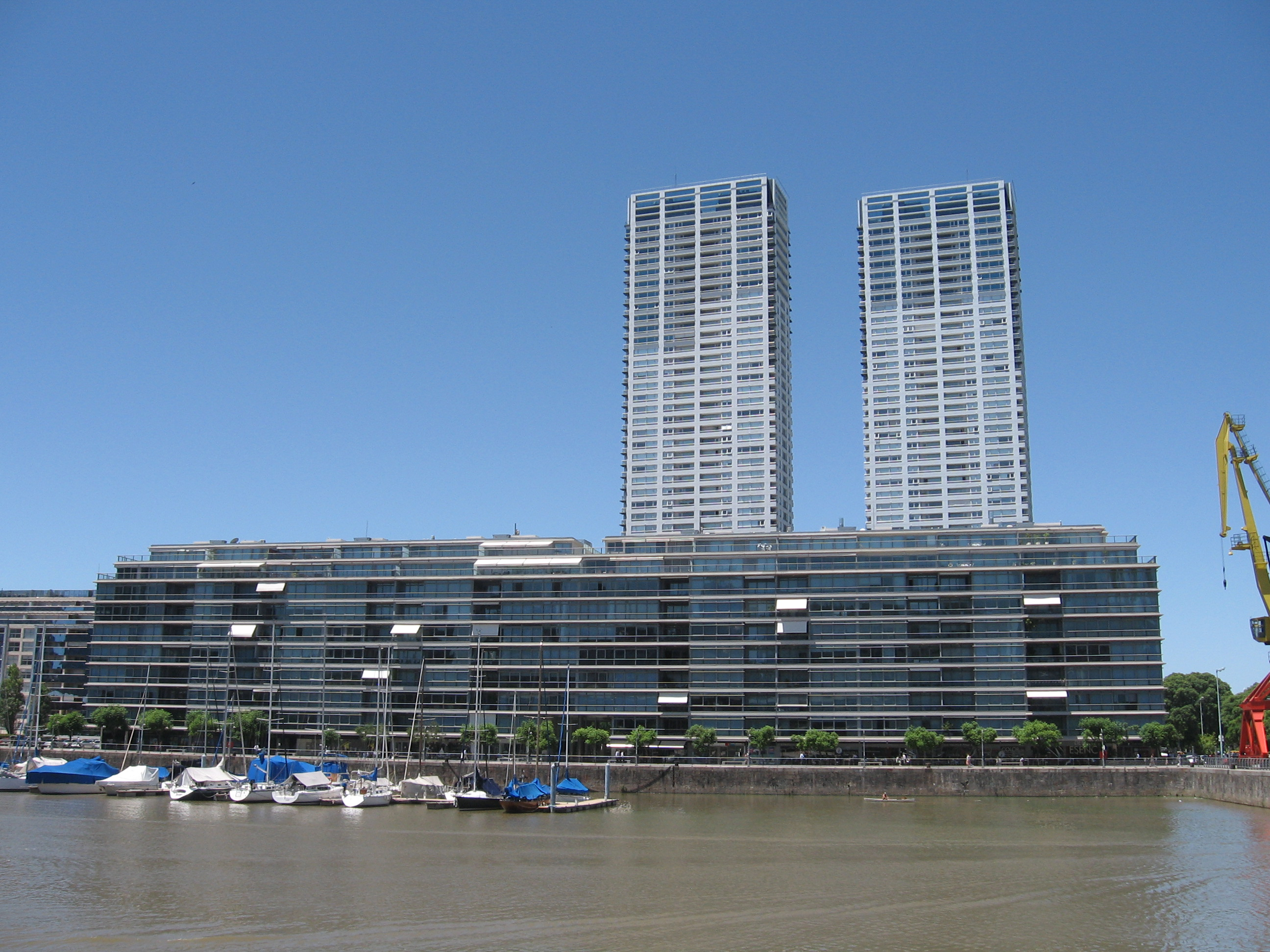

General information
- Type: Hotel
- Location: Juana Manso 555, Buenos Aires, Argentina
- Coordinates: 34.60397997°S 58.3641863°W
- Inaugurated: 2008

Madero Center is a hotel in Puerto Madero, Buenos Aires.

== Characteristics ==
Madero Center is a five-star hotel. It has a bar, two pools, a solarium and a sauna. It is divided in different towers, with each apartment costing nearly US$700,000.

Several Argentine politicians and businessmen have bought apartments in Madero Center, such as the former Vice President Amado Boudou and the businessman Cristóbal López. The former President Cristina Fernández de Kirchner has also bought two apartments and eight parking locations, but only as a financial investment.

== Controversies ==
=== Boudougate ===
The Vice President Amado Boudou, a former minister of economy, is accused of abusing his position as minister to save the firm Ciccone Calcográfica from bankruptcy, as he may have had personal links with the owners and thus a conflict of interest. Boudou denies such links. However, his monthly fee at Madero Center is paid through Siren S.A., which is associated to "London Supply", one of the firms that finances Ciccone out of the bankruptcy.

=== The Route of the K-Money ===
Madero Center was a controversial building in 2013, when Federico Elaskar told to the TV program Periodismo para todos that it held a firm known as "La Rosadita", used for money laundering. This firm channeled money from the Santa Cruz Province to Uruguay, and from Uruguay to Switzerland. The movements, made through shell corporations, were divided in portions of 1.5 million to avoid detection. The building has its own interior parking lot, allowing customers to move large sums of money without risk of street thieves. All new customers had to be invited by regular customers.

The judicial case was assigned to the judge Sebastián Casanello, who ordered a search and seizure at the building. This was done several days after the airing of the TV program. The investigation suggested that the computers had info erased in those days. Nevertheless, it was discovered that "Austral Construcciones", owned by Lázaro Báez, was a client of "La Rosadita". Báez is one of the main suspects of the judicial case.
