= La Presidenta =

2011 biography of Cristina Fernández de Kirchner

La Presidenta: historia de una vida
- First edition
- Author: Sandra Russo
- Language: Spanish
- Subject: Cristina Fernández de Kirchner
- Publisher: Editorial Sudamericana
- Publication date: July 2011
- Publication place: Argentina
- Media type: Print
- Pages: 320
- ISBN: 978-950-07-3623-7

La Presidenta: historia de una vida (Spanish: The President, story of a life) is a 2011 biography of Cristina Fernández de Kirchner, written by journalist Sandra Russo. It was ranked as the most sold non-fiction book in Argentina, according to ILHSA's sales data, in the first two weeks since its edition. It is based in four interviews with Cristina Fernández and other close politicians.

The book was critical with former members of the cabinet. Alberto Fernández was described as an agent of Clarín newspaper (in the context of the controversies between Clarín and Kirchnerism).

She said that it was a mistake to appoint Graciela Ocaña to the Ministry of Health. Ocaña revealed then that the president might have requested her to avoid taking actions against Juan José Zanola, a CGT unionist tried for embezzlement with health plans. She mentioned as well that she intended to improve the health plans system.

She also considered a mistake to select Julio Cobos to run for Vice President under her 2007 ticket. Cobos, as head of the Senate of Argentina, voted against a government proposal during the 2008 Argentine government conflict with the agricultural sector, and the government had a conflict with him since then. He said that the book had conceptual errors.
