= Road infrastructure case =

2016 judicial case in Argentina

The Grupo Austral case, or the road infrastructure case ("Causa Vialidad"), is an Argentine judicial proceeding entitled "No. 5048/2016 Grupo Austral et al. re abuse of authority and dereliction of the duties of a public official." It was initiated in 2016 by Judge Julián Ercolini, in a ruling dated 27 December 2016, who prosecuted businessman Lázaro Báez, former president Cristina Fernández de Kirchner, and several officials of her administration for various crimes. The case ended with a guilty sentence, which was appealed before the Supreme Court. The Court rejected the appeal and upheld the guilty verdict, which sentenced Cristina Kirchner to a six-year jail sentence and banned her from running for office.

== Investigation ==
According to studies of the road budget during twelve years, 11.6% of the funds went to the Santa Cruz Province and to the businessman Lázaro Báez, who managed $24.5 billion in dozens of public works contracts. In addition, there are suspicions of overpricing in the public work assigned by the government. Furthermore, many of these projects were left unfinished. According to a report issued by the National Roads Authority and carried out by the government of Mauricio Macri, half of the 51 projects granted to the Grupo Austral of Lázaro Báez in Santa Cruz remained unfinished as of December 2015. Of these, 90% had doubled or almost tripled the initial work period, demonstrating that from 2010 onwards, Báez received projects worth more than $16 billion, which represented 80% of the total public works allocated by the nation to the province.

On 12 September 2016, Federal Judge Julián Ercolini ordered former President Cristina Fernández de Kirchner to appear before the court on 20 October for alleged fraud against the public administration for directing public works contracts to businessman Lázaro Báez. The accusation relates to the construction of roads in the province of Santa Cruz between 2003 and 2015, which was monopolized by Austral Construcciones and its satellite companies, owned by Lázaro Báez. In addition, the judge understood that imposing a restraining order on his assets was appropriate "to prevent the handling, transfer, or disposition of assets that could ultimately constitute proceeds or profits from the crime under investigation." Cristina Fernández heads the list of 17 people called for questioning in the context of one of the chapters of the complaint for illicit association that Congresswoman Elisa Carrió filed in 2008.

== Prosecution ==
On 27 December 2016, in a 794-page ruling, Judge Ercolini indicted former president Cristina Kirchner, former Minister of Federal Planning Julio De Vido, former Secretary of Public Works José Francisco López, former Undersecretary of Federal Public Works Coordination Carlos Santiago Kirchner, and former head of the National Highway Administration Nelson Guillermo Periotti, for prima facie co-authors of the crimes of criminal association and aggravated fraudulent administration and ordered a seizure of 10 billion pesos on each of their assets. He indicted businessman Lázaro Báez as a necessary participant in the same crimes, ordering the same seizure. For the crime of aggravated fraudulent administration, as necessary participants, the Court prosecuted former National Highway Administration officials Raúl Osvaldo Daruich, Héctor René Jesús Garro, Raúl Gilberto Pavesi, Mauricio Collareda, José Raúl Santibáñez, and Juan Carlos Villafañe, with each facing a seizure of 2.5 billion pesos.

It ruled that there were no grounds for indictment or for the acquittal of charges against Eduardo Ernesto Morillo, an official who still serves at the National Highway Administration, and the former Undersecretaries of Public Works Graciela Elena Oporto, Raúl Víctor Rodríguez, Hugo Manuel Rodríguez, and Abel Julio Fatala. Among other considerations, the judge stated that "this is a criminal plan that extended over three presidential terms – for 12 years – designed by the top of the Executive Branch with the aim of illegally seizing the funds allocated to public road works, initially in the province of Santa Cruz" whose objective was "to enrich with public funds through the irregular awarding of public road works to businessman Lázaro Báez.". Judge Ercolini's ruling was appealed by Cristina Fernández de Kirchner, Lázaro Báez, Julio De Vido, and other defendants in the case, as well as by prosecutor Gerardo Pollicita, alleging that the ruling favored Abel Fatala.

== Trial ==
In May 2019, the oral trial phase of the case began in the Second Federal Criminal Court. Prosecutors Gerardo Pollicita and Ignacio Mahíques ruled that road works in Santa Cruz were awarded at their discretion to various companies belonging to the Austral Construcciones Group, amounting to nearly $46 billion as of August 2016. They claim that of the 51 awarded projects, only 26 were completed, and only two of these were completed within the agreed timeframe. The agreed amount was respected in one project, while in all the remaining projects, higher amounts were paid, in some cases exceeding the original contract value by 387%. After various appeals were resolved, 13 people were prosecuted: Fernandez de Kirchner, Julio De Vido, Jose Lopez, Abel Fatala, Carlos Kirchner, Nelson Periotti, Lazaro Baez, Raul Daruich, Mauricio Collareda, Hector Garro, Juan Carlos Villafañe, Raul Pavesi and Jose Santibáñez.

The oral trial took place between 2019 and 2022 before the Second Federal Criminal Court (judges Basso, Giménez Uriburu, and Gorini) and ended in the conviction of most of the defendants for fraud against the National State, with sentences ranging from three and a half to six years in prison. Prosecutor Pollicita had also charged the main perpetrators with criminal association, and the trial prosecutor, Diego Luciani, had upheld this accusation. However, the ruling did not consider this crime proven, based on the votes of Giménez Uriburu and Gorini. Judge Adrián Basso, in dissent, did vote for the conviction for criminal association. This conviction was appealed by the defense, and also by the trial prosecutor, in the latter case because the sentence was considered low and the crime of criminal association had been ruled out. The appeal by the Prosecutor's Office was upheld by the Cassation Prosecutor and has been under review by the Federal Criminal Cassation Court since May 2023, in a panel composed of Gustavo Hornos, Mariano Borinsky, and Diego Barroetaveña.
