= María José Sarmiento =

Argentine judge

Judge

María José Sarmiento is an Argentine judge.

== Biography ==
In 1997, during the government of Carlos Menem, she ruled against a rise in taxes for telephones. Other judges made similar rulings, which were ratified afterwards.

During 2002, she made many rulings that authorized people to access their money, held in the banks due to the corralito. By doing so she joined the line of judges that deemed the measure unconstitutional.

In 2007, she ordered Felisa Miceli, the Minister of Economy at the time, to answer to the Senate for an amount of money destined to the Greco group in a hidden manner.

In 2008, she considered that the blockade of the San Martín bridge by neighbours of the city, protesting against the placement of factories nearby, was illegal.

At the beginning of 2010, during a judicial break, she ruled against two decrees of President Cristina Fernández de Kirchner. She denied the use of Central Bank reserves for paying debt, and then ratified Martín Redrado as president of the bank.
