= 2012 fiscal austerity in Argentina =

Economic situation in Argentina

Argentina began a period of fiscal austerity in 2012, dubbed "Sintonía fina" (Spanish: Fine tuning) by the government. It included increases in several utility and public service rates, limits on wage raises, limits on imports, and a reorganization of state enterprises.

== Rates and fares ==
The administration of Néstor Kirchner and of his wife and successor, Cristina Fernández de Kirchner, had imposed price controls on utilities and public services, at levels cheaper than needed by service providers, since 2003. The state had provided subsidies to the service providers, compensating their losses. Fiscal austerity policies enacted early in 2012 removed many of these subsidies, however, leading to huge rate and fare increases. The removal of subsidies in the case of utility rates was done initially on a case-by-case basis, and by inviting people to voluntarily forfeit the subsidies by filling out a form; several politicians and other famous people did so. They were then removed for wealthy neighborhoods, and while rates were maintained in lower income districts, the increases were eventually extended to most people. Several unions requested wage raises in accordance to these increases and to high inflation generally; the rate and fare increases would cost up to 80% of the amount of the wage raises, however.

The increase in rates - up to 300% - has no similar precedent in recent Argentine history, save for those enacted by Economy Minister Domingo Cavallo more than a decade before.

== Wages ==
Inflation rates published by independent sources are very high, although INDEC, which is controlled by the presidency, publishes lower inflation rates. High inflation, in turn, has prompted trade unions in Argentina to request frequent wage increases. The National Government endorsed collective bargaining wage raise guidelines of 24% in 2010 and 25% in 2011. The average wage hike obtained by unions was 5% higher than these figures, however, and the administration's austerity guideline for 18% raises in 2012 was similarly flouted by subsequent collective bargaining agreements, which averaged nearly 25%. Hugo Moyano, head of the General Confederation of Labor (CGT), opposed the new, more moderate guidelines, and joined forces with a longtime rival, Restaurant Workers Union head Luis Barrionuevo, to pursue requests for higher raises. Antonio Caló of the Steel and Metalworkers Union (UOM) and Sergio Palazzo of the Bank Employees Union did likewise, announcing sectoral strikes in May to seek a 25% increase.

== Imports ==
Seeking to reverse a decline in foreign exchange reserves caused by the emergence of a negative current account balance in 2011, Commerce Secretary Guillermo Moreno enacted measures to prevent the purchase of U.S. dollars and to curtail imports. Several sectors of the Argentine economy, such as resellers and manufacturers that work with imported items, were harmed by these policies. Moreno stipulated that importers export at least as much as they import, and several firms were threatened with expropriation upon failure to do so. He organized a system, independent of the National Customs, to personally oversee the requests for imports; more than half of import requests filed under the new system were denied. This action generated diplomatic tension and commercial disputes with Brazil, Chile, Colombia, Mexico, and Peru.

== State enterprises ==
The Buenos Aires Metro had been subsidized as well; instead of removing these subsidies directly as was done with other services, however, the National Government proposed the subways' transfer to the City of Buenos Aires. Mayor Mauricio Macri initially accepted, but further differences arose. The National Government intended to transfer the subways without the subsidized budget needed to operate them, and the city had already passed a municipal budget for 2012 which did not consider these added costs. The 2012 Buenos Aires rail disaster generated concern about the conditions of railways and subways, moreover. The city administration considered that without the transfer of subsidies the city's economy would be harmed, and that the administration's conditions regarding these were an imposition. The National Government sent a bill to Congress to approve the transfer, and Macri did similarly with the City Legislature; both must approve the transfer to confirm it.

== Currency exchange rate ==
Changes related to the 2012 fiscal austerity measures, as well as the government's April 2012 seizure of the country's largest oil-and-gas corporation, YPF, also had a pronounced effect on currency trading for both institutions as well as individuals wanting to buy or sell pesos. Following the tightening of foreign export controls and import restrictions, in early 2012 a widening gulf emerged between the official peso-dollar exchange rate and the blue-chip swap rate, indicating a much weaker sentiment on the value of the peso relative to the U.S. dollar than the official exchange rate suggested. For tourists and local residents wanting to exchange dollars for pesos (or vice versa), it meant an active black market centered around Florida Street, where the peso could be traded for a lower value than the official exchange rate, which sees almost daily intervention from Argentina's central bank designed to slow its perceived weakening relative to the dollar. 2012's reforms, instead of having the intended effect of holding down interest rates and spurring economic recovery, ended up causing an immediate and sustained flight of capital from the traditional banking system into a robust underground economy.
