= 2011 Argentina–United States diplomatic crisis =

The 2011 Argentina–United States diplomatic crisis was caused by the temporary seizure of materials from a US military plane, followed by claims that the US may have been trying to smuggle weapons and drugs into the country.

== The event ==
Before the scandal, Argentina and the United States had made an agreement, allowing the US to train members of the Federal Police of Argentina and bring the required materials for doing so. However, when the American Boeing C-17 arrived in Argentina, it was subjected to a detailed search, led by the Argentine Minister of Foreign Relations, Héctor Timerman, and the Minister of Transport, Juan Pablo Schiavi, and with officials from the airport police, national customs and the AFIP.

Timerman opened a box with pliers, and seized it. He claimed that the flight was attempting to smuggle undeclared weapons and drugs. The seized materials included heavy guns, materials to intercept phone calls, and drugs. A member of the Federal Police explained to the Clarín newspaper that those things are standard tools in counter-terrorism operations.

The C-17 returned to the United States, without the seized materials. Arturo Valenzuela, US Assistant Secretary of State for Western Hemisphere Affairs, asked Timerman for the reasons to do that with a mission which had been already arranged.

US President Barack Obama requested that the contents of the box should be returned to the US, and wondered why the national minister of foreign relations would personally lead the search and seizure.

A judiciary case investigated the whole operation, and did not find any crime. The crisis led the US to reduce the number of joint military activities with Argentina.

== Bibliography ==
- Mendelevich, Pablo (2013). El Relato Kirchnerista en 200 expresiones [The Kirchnerite speech in 200 words] (in Spanish). Argentina: Ediciones B. ISBN 978-987-627-412-8.
