= Terrorism in Argentina =

Terrorism in Argentina has occurred since at least the 1970s, especially during the Argentine Dirty War, where a number of terror acts occurred, with support of both the democratic government of Juan Perón, Isabel Perón and the following de facto government of the National Reorganization Process. In the 1990s, two major terrorist attacks occurred in Buenos Aires, which together caused 115 deaths and left at least 555 injured.

Political terrorism from organizations such as Montoneros and ERP and state sponsored terrorism occurred in the 1970s by radical groups backed by the Argentine democratic government and, later, by the military government. The government also warned the press to minimise reporting of terrorism.

== State terrorism ==
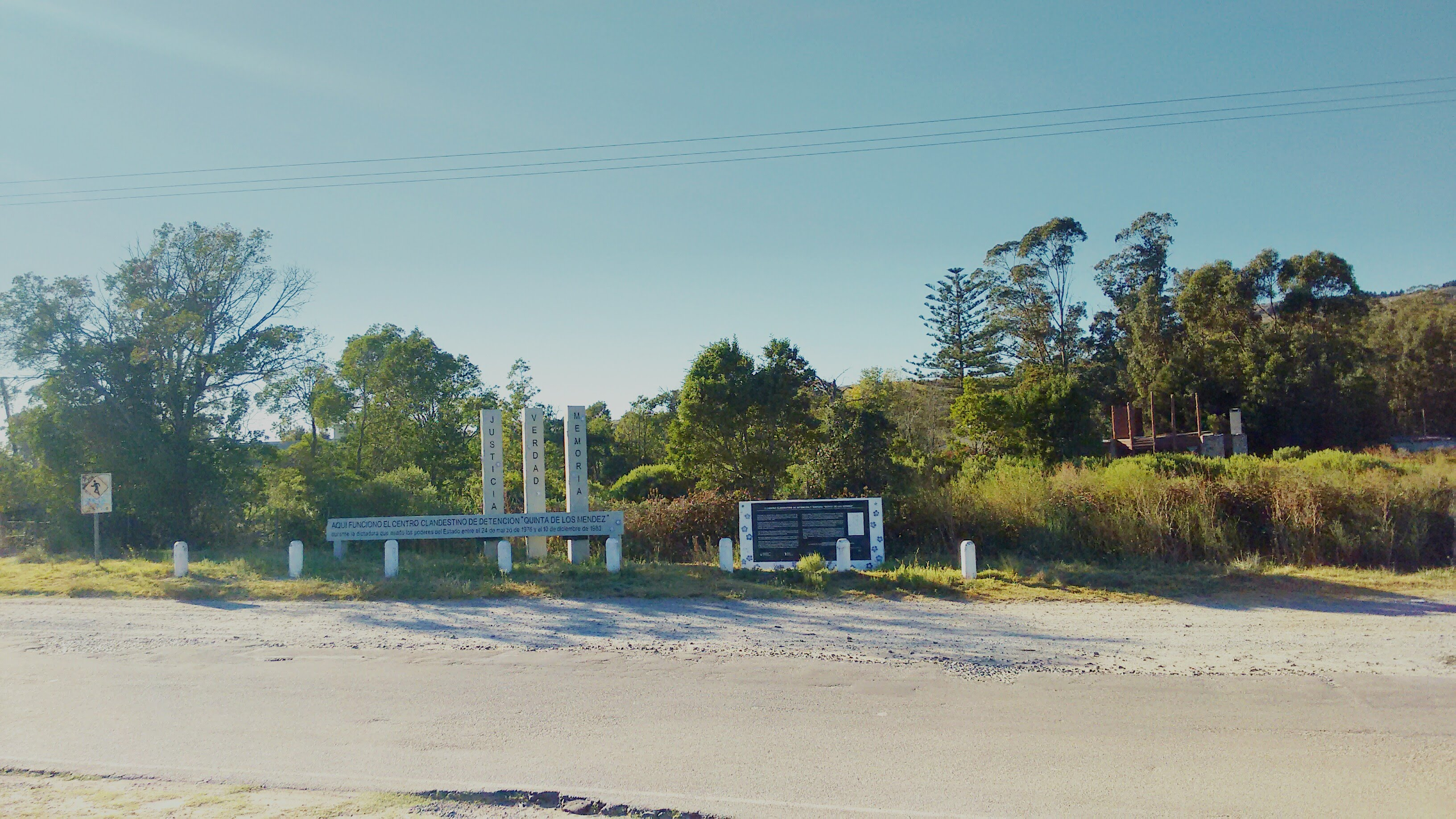
Memorial at the former detention center of Quinta de Mendez

The Dirty War (Spanish: Guerra sucia) was the name used by the military junta or civic-military dictatorship of Argentina (Spanish: dictadura cívico-militar de Argentina) for the period of state-sponsored violence in Argentina from 1974 to 1983. During this campaign, military and security forces and death squads in the form of the Argentine Anticommunist Alliance (AAA, or Triple A) hunted down any political dissidents and anyone believed to be associated with socialism, communism, left-wing Peronism, or the Montoneros movement.

It is estimated that between 13,000 and 30,000 people were killed or disappeared, many of whom were impossible to formally document. A secret report from Chilean secret police DINA estimated that 22,000 people had been murdered or disappeared by 1978. During this period, at least 12,000 "detenidos-desaparecidos" (detained-disappeared) were held by the National Executive Branch (Poder Ejecutivo Nacional or PEN) and kept in clandestine detention camps throughout Argentina, before eventually being freed under diplomatic pressure.The primary targets were communist guerrillas and sympathisers but also included students, militants, trade unionists, writers, journalists, artists and any citizens suspected of being left-wing activists who were thought to be a political or ideological threat to the junta. According to human rights organisations in Argentina, the victims included between 1,900 and 3,000 Jews, amounting to some 5–12% of those targeted despite Argentinian Jews comprising only 1% of the population. The killings were committed by the Junta in an attempt to fully silence social and political opposition.

By the 1980s, economic collapse, public discontent, and the disastrous handling of the Falklands War resulted in the end of the junta and the restoration of democracy in Argentina, effectively ending the Dirty War. Numerous members of the junta were prosecuted and imprisoned for crimes against humanity and genocide as a result of their actions during the period.

== Terrorist attacks ==
=== Battle of La Tablada ===
The assault on the military barracks located in La Tablada, in the province of Buenos Aires, Argentina, by 40 members of Movimiento Todos por la Patria (MTP), commanded by former ERP leader Enrique Gorriarán Merlo. 39 people were killed and 60 injured by the time the Argentine army retook the barracks. The MTP carried out the assault under the alleged pretense of preventing a military coup supposedly planned for the end of January 1989 by the Carapintadas, a group of far-right military officers who opposed the investigations and trials concerning Argentina's last civil-military dictatorship (1976–1983).

The Argentine president of the time, Raúl Alfonsín declared that the attack, which carried the ultimate goal of sparking a massive popular uprising, could have led to a civil war. Given a life sentence and imprisoned, as his comrades, in high security quarters, Gorriarán Merlo was eventually freed in 2003. He died on 22 September 2006 while awaiting surgery for an abdominal aortic aneurysm.

=== 1992 Israeli embassy bombing ===
On 17 March 1992, a suicide bombing attack occurred at the Israeli embassy in Buenos Aires, Argentina. In the attack, 29 civilians were killed, and 242 additional civilians were injured.

=== 1994 AMIA bombing ===
On 18 July 1994, a car bombing took place at the Asociación Mutual Israelita Argentina (AMIA; Argentine Israelite Mutual Association) building in Buenos Aires killing 85 people and injuring hundreds.

=== Attacks in 2000s ===
During the 1998–2002 Argentine great depression a series of attacks were reported on 18 December in which an improvised bomb detonated in front of a commercial establishment, leaving only material damage. On 8 May 2002 a bomb detonated in front of a Banco Francés ATM near a shopping mall in Buenos Aires. Police reported that the attack was attributed to a self-described, "Comando Nacionalista Ricardo López Jordán". Days later an improvised explosive/incendiary attack were blast in a branch of Banco Francés bank Villa Urquiza, Buenos Aires. The "Comando Nacionalista Ricardo López Jordán" and "Comando Felipe Varela" claimed responsibility for the attack.

On 6 June three bombs blast in a series of anti-US propaganda bombings (being affected a Citibank branch, a McDonald's and a Blockbuster) leaving only material damage. More a year later, in 21 December, of 2006 an improvised device detonated at an HSBC branch in Buenos Aires, days later a far left cell so-called "Brigada Venceremos" claimed responsibility for the attack. In the early morning of 16 November 2009 in Buenos Aires, Argentina an explosion in front of Banco Ciudad branch in front of a luxury hotel, days later an anarchist-communist so-called "Célula Revolucionaria Marco Ariel Antonioletti" claimed responsibility for the attack.

=== Wave of anarchist attacks (2010–2013) ===
On 3 February 2010 a branch of LAN AIRLINES was attacked with an improvised explosive device, leaving only material damage in the downtown of Neuquén, Neuquén Province. Days later an anarchist group so-called "Brigada Internacionalista Insurreccionalista Rebeldes de Jacinto Araoz" claimed the incident in a web statement. On 23 December 2010 an improvised device blast in Plaza Constitución the morning of the same day the attack did not cause material damage, and the "Comando Juan Eliseo Ledesma" claimed the attack in a statement.

On 19 July 2011 an improvised explosive device blast in front of a Telecom Argentina office in Belgrano, Buenos Aires, causing only material damages and no casualties were reported. At the next day the "Comando Revolucionario del Pueblo Mario Roberto Santucho" (CRP-MRS) claimed responsibility for the attack.

Between 2011 and 2013, anarchist groups claimed the largest campaign of political violence in recent Argentine history without dead or injured with attacks that reached police patrols, government and bank buildings and private property. On 29 November 2011, an improvised explosive device (IED) detonated at the main police station in the Buenos Aires city suburb of Avellaneda. The explosion damaged the building and nearby businesses but caused no injuries. At the scene, police found pamphlets from an anarchist group calling itself the "Eduardo Maria Vazquez Aguirre Anti-Prison Insurgent Cell" (Celula insurrexional antikarcelaria Eduardo María Vázquez Aguirre). Eduardo Maria was a Spanish anarchist who reportedly killed the Chief of the Argentine Police in a 1909 bombing. The pamphlet also stated that the bombing was in retaliation for the deaths of six named individuals shot by Buenos Aires police officers.

On 21 December 2011 an IED detonated within 100 meters from the Security Ministry headquarters in downtown Buenos Aires. The explosion damaged nearby cars and buildings but caused no injuries. A group calling itself "the Nucleus of Conspirators for the Extension of Chaos" claimed credit for the attack and indicated that it would soon conduct more attacks. On August 15, 2012, an improvised device blast in a FIAT dealership in Monserrat, Buenos Aires, causing slight material damage in one car. Days after the attack, an anarchist cell so-called Conspiración Internacional por la Venganza-Federación Anarquista Informal claimed the incident, mentioning that the attack was in response to the arrests and trials against anarchist militants in Chile and Greece.

On 19 September 2013, a small improvised explosive device detonated in front of the headquarters of the Mutual Help Association of the Argentine National Gendarmerie. Two gendarmes were slightly wounded. Several groups claimed responsibility.

=== Resistencia Ancestral Mapuche (RAM) ===
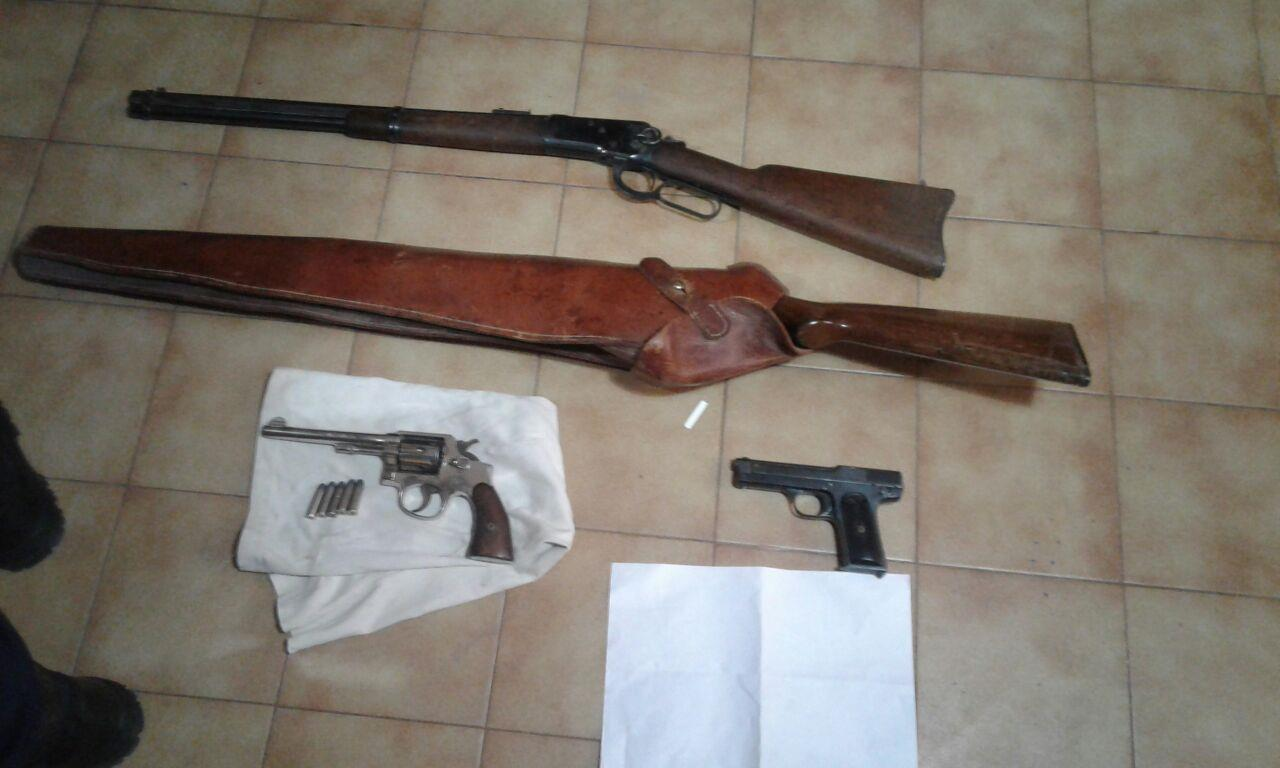
Weapons confiscated from RAM after an operation carried out by security forces

Resistencia Ancestral Mapuche (RAM) is a supposed armed organization based in the Argentine Patagonia, suspected of being an assembly of intelligence services. Its existence is not proven by solid evidence or judicial headquarters. According to the Mapuche communities, the Bishop of Bariloche, politicians and journalists, the RAM does not exist or is a group created by the intelligence services of the Argentine State, in the context of the conflict for the recognition of the rights of indigenous communities over their ancestral lands, opened after the constitutional reform of 1994 (art. 75, inc. 17)

=== November 2018 incidents ===
In November 2018, two attackers detonated a pipe bomb at La Recoleta Cemetery in Buenos Aires. Police believed the attack was planned against the tomb of Ramón Lorenzo Falcón, former chief of the Argentine Federal Police who ordered the violent repression of an anarchist demonstration in 1909. According to Buenos Aires city security minister Marcelo D'Alessandro, the suspects were "tied to anarchist groups" and used a "quite sophisticated" homemade explosive device. No bystanders were injured in the attack; the female attacker suffered serious injuries, including burns and loss of multiple digits. Thirteen people were arrested in connection with the incident. Police seized materials including fuses, gunpowder, pipes, and nails from an apartment in the San Cristóbal neighborhood.

In a separate incident the same day, a man threw an explosive device at the home of federal judge Claudio Bonadio in the Belgrano neighborhood of Buenos Aires. Bonadio was known for leading multiple high-profile cases and investigations, including of former presidents Fernando de la Rúa, Néstor Kirchner, and Cristina Fernández de Kirchner. Police arrested the suspect and later detonated the device in a controlled explosion.

== International terrorism ==
=== Islamist groups ===
According to the CIA's World Factbook, Hezbollah conducted operations in the 1990s and as of April 2018 maintains a limited presence in the country, with the aim of generating political and financial support from the Lebanese diaspora. In July 2019, Argentina officially designated Hezbollah as a terrorist organization, freezing its assets and accusing the group of responsibility for the 1992 Israeli embassy bombing and the 1994 AMIA bombing. Argentina is the first country in Latin America to designate Hezbollah as a terrorist organization.

In April 2024, Argentina’s Federal Court of Criminal Cassation ruled that Iran had sponsored and orchestrated the 1992 and 1994 bombings, declaring Iran to be a "terrorist state". In July of that year, the office of Argentine president Javier Milei designated Hamas as a terrorist organization and froze the group's financial assets, citing its involvement in the October 7 attacks and its close relationship with Iran.

The Argentine government declared the Egypt, Lebanon, and Jordan branches of the Muslim Brotherhood to be terrorist organizations in January 2026, citing "official reports attributing illegal activities across national borders", including acts of terrorism and extremist rhetoric. The move came one day after the United States made the same designation, and followed the actions of countries such as Israel, Paraguay, the United Arab Emirates, and Egypt.

Also in January 2026, Argentina designated the Quds Force, the foreign operations branch of Iran's Islamic Revolutionary Guard Corps (IRGC), as a terrorist organization. The government's statement said that the group engages in "training for the execution of terrorist attacks in other countries" and called it responsible for the 1992 and 1994 bombings. Two months later, Argentina declared the entire IRGC to be a terrorist organization.

=== Drug cartels ===
After the United States designated the Cartel of the Suns as a terrorist organization in July 2025, Argentina became one of several Latin American countries to follow suit, along with Ecuador, Paraguay, the Dominican Republic, and Peru. In March 2026, Argentina designated the Jalisco New Generation Cartel (CJNG), a Mexican criminal syndicate and drug cartel, as a terrorist organization, citing "official reports that confirm transnational illicit activities, as well as links to other terrorist organisations". Argentina is the third country to declare CJNG a terrorist organization, following the United States and Canada.

== Counterterrorism efforts ==
Following the two bombings in Buenos Aires, national, regional, and local institutions responsible for emergency response in Argentina sought to improve their planning and preparedness for terrorism-related events. The Argentine Government also introduced legislative measures to help deal with the threat of terrorism.

=== SIFEM (1996) ===
In 1996, the Argentine Government enacted legislation, which launched the Sistema Federal de Emergencias (SIFEM) or Federal Emergency System under the direction of the president.

=== Argentina's Anti-Terrorism Law (2007) ===
The Argentine Congress passed Argentina's Anti-Terrorism Law in 2007, focusing on preventing money laundering for financing terror attacks.

=== Anti-terror legislation (2011) ===
On 22 December 2011, the Argentine Congress approved a package of modifications to existing Argentine law aimed at combating terrorism and financial crime. The changes raised concerns with human rights advocates.

=== Federal Investigations Department (2025) ===
In June 2025, Minister of Security Patricia Bullrich announced the creation of the Federal Investigations Department (Spanish: Departamento Federal de Investigaciones) within the Argentine Federal Police. The department is tasked with investigating terrorism as well as drug trafficking, organized crime, and other serious offenses.

== All attacks 1970s–2010s ==
At least 830 incidents have been recorded, these incidents resulted in the deaths of 540 people and injured over 750.

Terrorism in Argentina 1970s–2010s
Decade	Total incidents	Total deaths	Total injuries
1970s	332	365	159
1980s	308	47	74
1990s	161	125	513
2000s	11	2	4
2010s	18	3	7
Total	830	542	757

=== Attacks by year ===
Terrorist Attacks in Argentina by Year
Year	Incidents	Deaths	Injuries
2016	2	0	2
2015	1	0	0
2014	2	1	0
2013	2	0	1
2012	2	0	0
2011	3	0	4
2010	6	2	0
2009	1	0	0
2008	0	0	0
2007	0	0	0
2006	0	0	0
2005	4	0	0
2004	0	0	0
2003	2	0	0
2002	1	2	0
2001	2	0	1
2000	1	0	3
1999	1	0	0
1998	0	0	0
1997	11	3	2
1996	19	1	12
1995	16	0	1
1994	14	86	266
1993	0	0	0
1992	41	33	224
1991	28	1	7
1990	31	1	1
1989	32	25	17
1988	34	1	16
1987	80	3	11
1986	33	2	12
1985	43	2	10
1984	46	1	4
1983	18	1	3
1982	11	4	0
1981	2	0	0
1980	9	8	1
1979	16	11	12
1978	24	13	11
1977	17	6	12
1976	54	162	90
1975	38	123	16
1974	71	21	12
1973	68	15	4
1972	16	5	0
1971	7	5	0
1970	21	4	2
Total	830	542	757

== See also ==
- Crime in Argentina
