= 17A =

Series of protests in Argentina in 2020

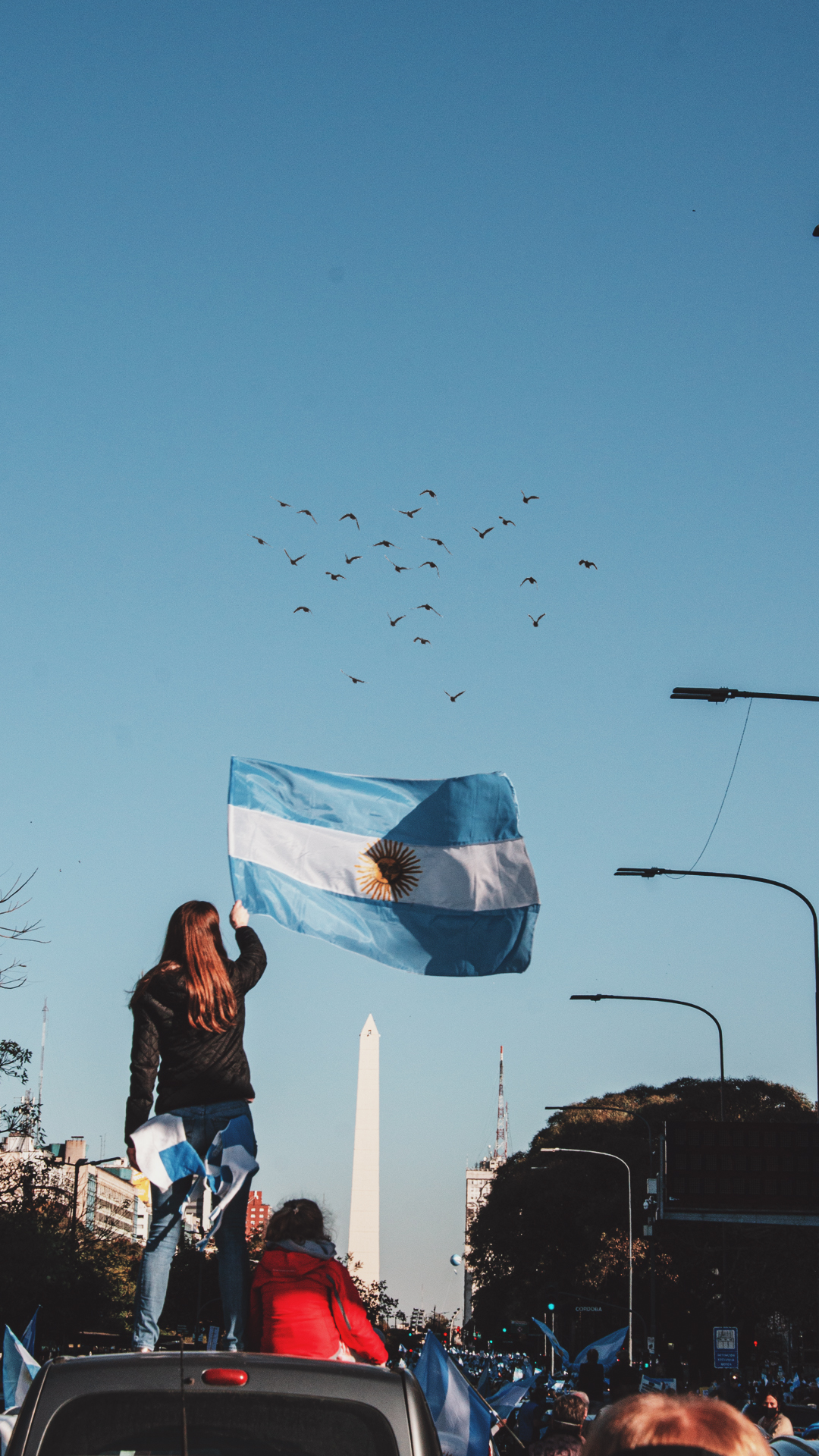
- Date: August 17, 2020
- Location: Argentina (Buenos Aires, Córdoba, Santa Fe, Mendoza, etc.)
- Caused by: Democratic backsliding and prospect of dissolution of the Congress; Widespread government corruption; Inefficient government response to the COVID-19 pandemic; Extreme yet inefficient response of the government; Rampant crime, violence and classism; Increase on state pensions and sharp decrease on social incentives
- Goals: Maintenance of the separation of powers and defense of the institutions; Relaxation of quarantine measures; More freedom of movement; Stop further democratic backsliding of the government; Resignation of president Alberto Fernández and Minister of Health Ginés González García (far-right minority groups)
- Methods: demonstrations, civil disobedience, online activism, protest march, cacerolazos, car marches
- Result: On 18 September, president Alberto Fernández announced less social restrictions and more economic relief; Increased political and social division; Fernández's popularity collapsed, with near 70% of disapproval
- Concessions: Less restrictive social distancing since September; Eventual dismissal of González García due to vaccine corruption in 2021

Parties
Government of Argentina; Pro-government parties; Frente de Todos; Peronist Party; Ministry of Health (Argentina)	Non-partisan protesters; Anti-peronist groups; Juntos por el Cambio (support)

Lead figures
(Argentina) Alberto Fernández	Non-partisan protesters

Number
	Thousands

The 17A protests were a series of massive demonstrations in Argentina which took place on August 17, 2020, amid the COVID-19 pandemic, for several causes, including defense constitutional institutions and separation of powers, against a justice reform project that would further empower the government, the quarantine legislation (Argentina had the harshest and largest quarantine in the world, though it proved futile), state indifference amidst rampant theft, and a raise on state pensions.

The main protest was in the Buenos Aires Obelisk. Demonstrations were also held in other parts of the city, such as Cabildo and Juramento (a main intersection in Belgrano), in front of the department of Cristina Kirchner (in Recoleta), and in other cities: Córdoba, Santa Fe, Mendoza, Tucumán, Mar del Plata, Lomas de Zamora, Adrogué, Avellaneda (Santa Fe), Viedma. Protests were also held in Punta del Este, Uruguay.

The protests were organized mainly through social networks, by accounts that oppose the government, but with a nonpartisan focus, since no political party claimed the protests and there wasn't a consolidated opposition leader yet, and neither any party emblems were seen in the protests. Still, some politicians who oppose the government took part in the protests as private citizens, such as Patricia Bullrich, the leader of the PRO party. The Peronist government of the time mocked the participants and accused them of being "anti-quarantine", denying pandemic containment efforts.

== Causes ==
On March 12, 2020, a strict lockdown was established across Argentina. This, at first, caused a spike in the positive image of President Alberto Fernández during March. Several causes made it went down over the following months of "preventive and mandatory isolation", reaching in August a record-low positive image since the start of the lockdown measures. Opinion Polls showed a sharp decline in economic expectations of the population, primarily in the future employment and prices expectations.

People who approved the handle of the pandemic went from a 91.7% in March to a 62.4% in June, while disapproval went from a 5.5% in March to a 35.8% in June.

On the 9th of July, protesters rallied against the government on the Buenos Aires Obelisk and in several other points of the country.

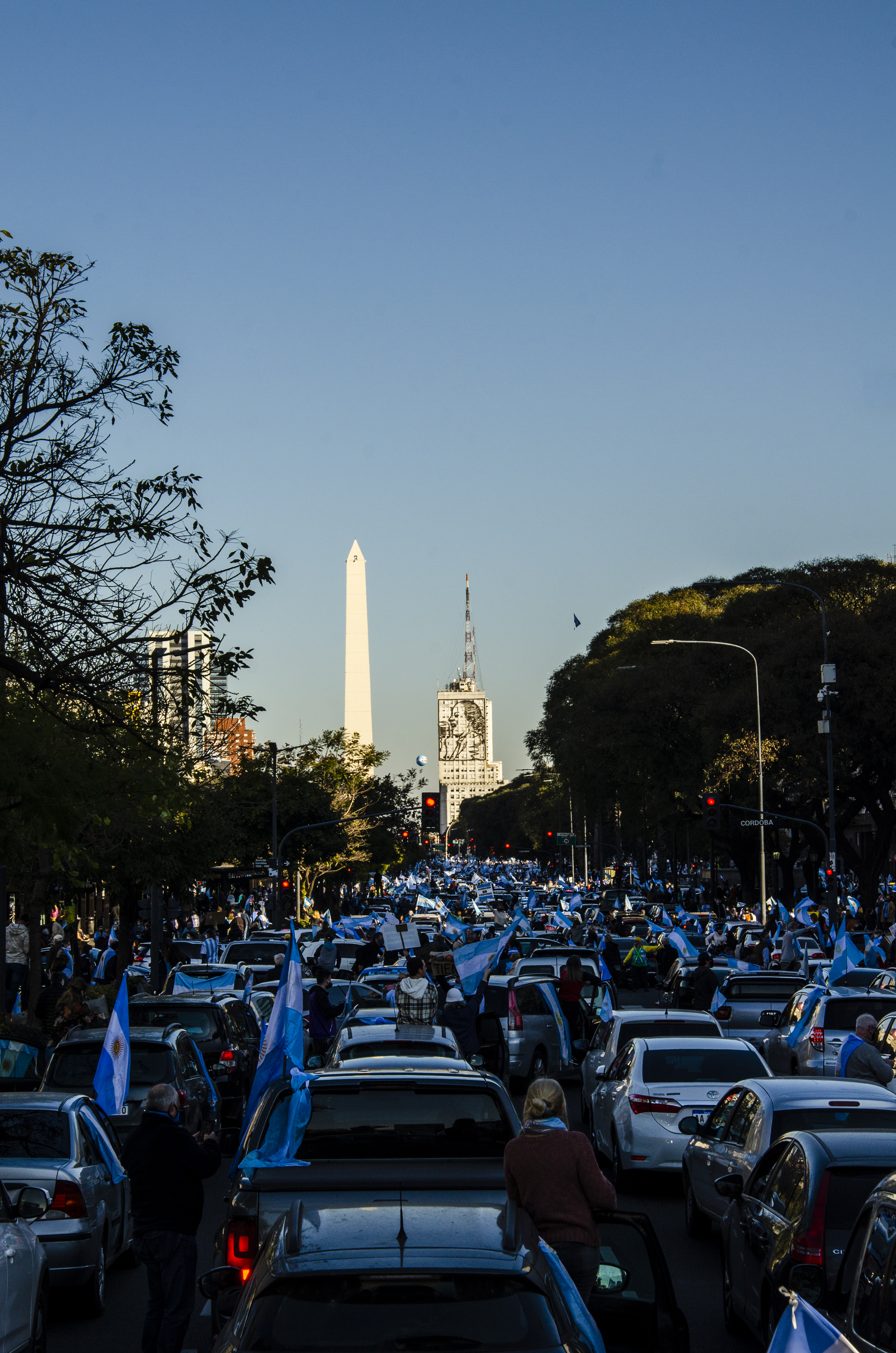
Protests in the 9 de Julio Avenue

On the 30th of July, the President sent the Congress a Bill for Justice Reform with the objective, according to Fernández, of being able to "better organize the Federal Justice and overcoming the crisis affecting the credibility and well-function of the Federal Criminal Justice. This project foresaw the unification of Criminal and Economic Justice and the creation of 23 new courts, what would dilute the influence of the country's 12 federal judges, as well as the merger of appeal courts and imposing several new procedure rules for Federal Judges. Also, an Advisory Board was created to propose reforms on the Supreme Court and the Council of Magistracy.

In August, negative image of Alberto Fernandez surpassed, for the first time, the positive one. Only one poll, conducted by the state-owned UBA School of Social Sciences, showed a larger positive than negative image on the President.

In the Buenos Aires Province, primarily the Greater Buenos Aires, an increase in crimes committed by people with no previous record was seen, qualified as "survival crime" by the Minister of Security of the province, Sergio Berni. This increase on crime was heavily covered by mass media and was one of the protesters claims. The National Ministry of Security, Sabina Frederic, stated: "There are not so much robberies [...] we are seeing violence acts during crime happening, which are being alerted, mainly, by mass media, which make them visible and follow-up the cases". After this statements, the Chief of the Cabinet of Ministers (Santiago Cafiero) added: "What I know is what the Ministry of Security, Frederic, is proposing according to a statistics comparing with the last year. Now, comparing with March, there are obviously more cases".

By the 17th of August, the day protests took place, the lockdown measures (officially known as "preventive and mandatory social isolation") had been on for 151 days in both the City of Buenos Aires and its Greater Area, while most of the rest of the country had gone to a less-strict phase called Social Distancing.

== Government response ==
- Alberto Fernández, president of Argentina: "The protests are an invitation to contagion", and "They won't bend us, those who scream are usually not right"
- Ginés González García, Ministry of Health: "Today I read that elder people is being invited... it is a joke. The protests are a joke on all the measures we are trying with a big effort of all the argentine people".
- Santiago Cafiero, chief of staff: "We apologize to healthcare workers for not being able to avoid the protests".
- Roberto Salvarezza, Ministry of Science and Technology: "it will bring consequences in the number of infected people".
- Luana Volnovich, head of PAMI (a public health insurance for the elders): "If someone invited my mom to a protest, I'd kill them".

== Participants ==
Several public figures from Argentina participated in the protests:

- Luis Brandoni, actor
- Patricia Bullrich, chairwoman of the PRO party
- Waldo Wolff, deputy (Juntos Por el Cambio)
- Héctor "Toty" Flores, deputy (Juntos Por el Cambio)
- Carolina Píparo, Buenos Aires province deputy (Juntos Por el Cambio)
- Hernán Lombardi, politician
- Andrés Horacio Ibarra, former Minister

== See also ==
- 8N
- 18A
- 13N
- 18F
