= Alberto Nisman =

Argentine lawyer and prosecutor (1963–2015)

- Nisman during an Infobae interview, November 2013
- Born: Natalio Alberto Nisman; 5 December 1963; Buenos Aires, Argentina
- Died: 18 January 2015 (aged 51); Buenos Aires, Argentina
- Cause of death: Suicide by shooting (according to Argentina's Supreme Court forensic experts group in 2015); Murder by shooting (according to Argentina's Gendarmerie on 1 June 2018)
- Resting place: La Tablada Israelite Cemetery
- Occupation: Lawyer
- Known for: Prosecutor of the AMIA bombing case

Natalio Alberto Nisman (5 December 1963 – 18 January 2015) was an Argentine lawyer who worked as a federal prosecutor, noted for being the chief investigator of the 1994 car bombing of a Jewish center in Buenos Aires, which killed 85 people, the deadliest terrorist attack in Argentina's history. On 18 January 2015, Nisman was found dead at his home in Buenos Aires, one day before he was scheduled to report on his findings before a Congress inquiry, with supposedly incriminating evidence against high-ranking officials of the then-current Argentinian government, including former president Cristina Fernández de Kirchner, regarding the Memorandum of Understanding between Argentina and Iran.

Nisman's death was initially ruled a suicide by a group of forensic experts appointed by Argentina's Supreme Court in 2015. In 2017, Nisman's death was later determined to have been a homicide by a forensic group of the Gendarmerie.

In December 2017, Cristina Kirchner was indicted for treason by judge Claudio Bonadio. In March 2018, it was announced that she would be put on trial for an alleged cover-up of Iran's role in the AMIA bombing (the "treason" charge was later dropped from the accusation) through the intended never-ratified Memorandum of Understanding between Argentina and Iran. After analyzing the claims of the defendants in the case for the never-ratified Memorandum with Iran, on October 7, 2021, the Federal Oral Court 8 declared the case null and void. The judges concluded that there was no crime in the signing of the agreement with Iran, and declared a judicial dismissal of Cristina Kirchner and the other defendants. In 2023, on appeal, the Federal Chamber of Cassation revoked the dismissal that Cristina Fernández de Kirchner had benefited from, and ordered her to be tried for the alleged cover-up for which Alberto Nisman accused her regarding the Argentina-Iran Memorandum of Understanding. The relatives of the victims of the AMIA attack had demanded that the oral trial against the former president be held. The reasons are that "the accused persons are attributed to the organization of a complex criminal plan to achieve or favor the impunity of the Iranian citizens suspected of having participated in the terrorist attack on the AMIA headquarters through two parallel channels, one formal — with the signing of the memorandum of understanding — and another informal, with unofficial negotiations."

In April 2024, 30 years after the attack of AMIA, the Federal Chamber of Cassation ruled in a sentence that the government of Iran was the mastermind behind the attack and ordered its execution. The Cassation Chamber stated that Iran orchestrated the massacre and classified it as a crime against humanity. In a divided sentence, two of the three judges of this second instance tribunal (Carlos Mahiques and Diego Barroetaveña) ruled that the attack was part of Iran's political and strategic design, and was executed by the terrorist organization Hezbollah, also considering Alberto Nisman's hypothesis as correct and corresponding with the alleged circumstances that originated the attack on AMIA, although the third judge, Ángela Ledesma, differing completely from her colleagues, refused to make any consideration of the responsibility of Hezbollah or Iran "taking into account that this topic is not part of the object of the appeals presented", and harshly criticized the original judicial investigation since it never followed through (or disproved) the so-called "Syrian trail" hypothesis for the attack, choosing instead to focus solely on Iran. However, the Cassation Chamber's ruling did not occur in the context of an official trial against those responsible for the AMIA attack, being instead part of a parallel process that was opened to investigate a cover-up carried out by the first judicial and government officials who were in charge of the "AMIA case" during the 1990s and early 2000s; the attack against the main community center of the Argentine Jewish community not only remains as the worst act of terrorism in the history of Argentina, but also as one of the greatest examples of impunity three decades later: with none of the perpetrators arrested or a single suspect tried, those who received prison sentences were instead the first judge (Juan José Galeano), paid informants, prosecutors and other officials who handled the original case and investigation.

The judge in charge of Nisman's death case since Bonadio's demise in 2020, Julián Ercolini, chose to partially take the Gendarmerie's forensic findings indicating a murder (similarly as with the Federal Chamber and the Court of Cassation), as well as ratifying the presumption of homicide, so that is the figure that still stands nine years after the death of the prosecutor, but far from finding the material authors, the investigation apparently remains determined to only search for whoever gave the alleged order to murder Nisman. Meanwhile, other files that also emerged from the main investigation are completely paralyzed, including a case for alleged money laundering that involves relatives of Nisman and his underling Diego Lagomarsino, a case for an undeclared bank account in New York and purchased lands in Punta del Este, and suspicious real estate ventures in Buenos Aires.

To date, and despite all the accusations, theories, and alleged evidence collected about Nisman's death, no actual trial has been carried out to determine with complete certainty what really happened, and formally sentence the guilty parties in case of murder.

== Biography ==
=== Early life and career ===
Alberto Nisman was born to a middle-class Jewish family in Buenos Aires. He started his career as a prosecutor in Morón, Buenos Aires. He was married to judge Sandra Arroyo Salgado, with whom he had two daughters.

He graduated from the University of Buenos Aires, and served as a law clerk at the National Tribunals Courthouse. He was later appointed prosecutor in the suburban Morón, Buenos Aires, district.

=== AMIA Special Prosecutor ===
Nisman was appointed Special Prosecutor in charge of the AMIA bombing investigation on 13 September 2004. The probe into the 1994 terrorist attack against the Asociación Mutual Israelita Argentina (AMIA) had been marked by judicial misconduct, and had reached an impasse. On October 25, 2006, Nisman formally accused the government of Iran of directing the AMIA bombing, and the Hezbollah militia of carrying it out. According to the prosecution, Argentina had been targeted by Iran after Buenos Aires' decision to suspend a nuclear technology transfer contract to Tehran. In November 2007, following the accusation, Interpol published the names of six individuals officially accused for their role in the terrorist attack. They were entered in the Interpol red notice list: Imad Fayez Moughnieh, Ali Fallahijan, Mohsen Rabbani, Ahmad Reza Asghari, Ahmad Vahidi and Mohsen Rezaee.

Nisman asked in 2008 for the detention of the former President Carlos Menem and Judge Juan José Galeano, who first presided over the AMIA case until his removal in 2004. WikiLeaks revealed that US diplomats considered that Nisman may have done this so as to be in good standing with President Cristina Fernández de Kirchner. He was considered a possible candidate for General Prosecutor of the Nation, after the resignation of Esteban Righi during the Boudougate scandal in 2012.

Santiago O'Donnell, a journalist and writer who published the books Argenleaks and Politileaks, both of which analyse the Wikileaks cable leak concerning Argentina's foreign and domestic policies, stated that during his investigation, he found clear and strong ties and "friendship" between Nisman, the CIA and the Embassy of Argentina in Washington, D.C. According to O'Donnell, the cables revealed Nisman had received recommendation from the US embassy to not investigate the Syrian clues in the AMIA bombing and the local connection of the terrorist attack, and that he was instead to assume certain guilt of Iranian suspects, although no trial had been conducted.

Nisman rejected the 2013 memorandum of understanding signed with Iran to investigate the case. Two years later, he accused President Cristina Kirchner, Foreign Minister Héctor Timerman and other politicians of covering up Iranian suspects in the case. The report was largely based on wiretap reports of close allies of Kirchner alleged to be "clearly acting on orders from her" and others, including Mohsen Rabbani, a former cultural attaché at Iran's embassy in Buenos Aires.

The accusation was also based on his stated belief that the administration had petitioned Interpol to lift Red Notices against numerous Iranian officials during said negotiations. The Secretary-General of Interpol at the time, Ronald Noble, noted on 15 January 2015 that no such requests had been made; "on each occasion that you and I spoke about the Interpol red notices issued in connection to the AMIA case, you stated that Interpol should keep the red notices effective," Noble wrote in an email addressed to Timerman. On the same day of Nisman's death, a recent interview with Noble was published by the newspaper Página/12; when asked about Nisman's belief and affirmation of the lifting of the Red Notices, Noble declared: "Prosecutor Nisman's assertion is false."

Federal Judge Daniel Rafecas dismissed the complaint, resubmitted to the courts by Federal Prosecutor Gerardo Pollicita, on 26 February. "The judge believes the minimum conditions to launch a criminal investigation have not been met, based on what the prosecutor presented," the Judicial Information Centre (CIJ) said in a statement. Rafecas noted in his ruling that "none of the two hypotheses of a crime put forward by prosecutor Pollicita in his writ stand up to the minimum level of scrutiny." Pollicita did not succeed Nisman as chief AMIA prosecutor; this office was headed as of 13 February by Sabrina Namer, Patricio Sabadini, Roberto Salum, and the prosecution task force coordinator, Juan Murray.

== Death ==
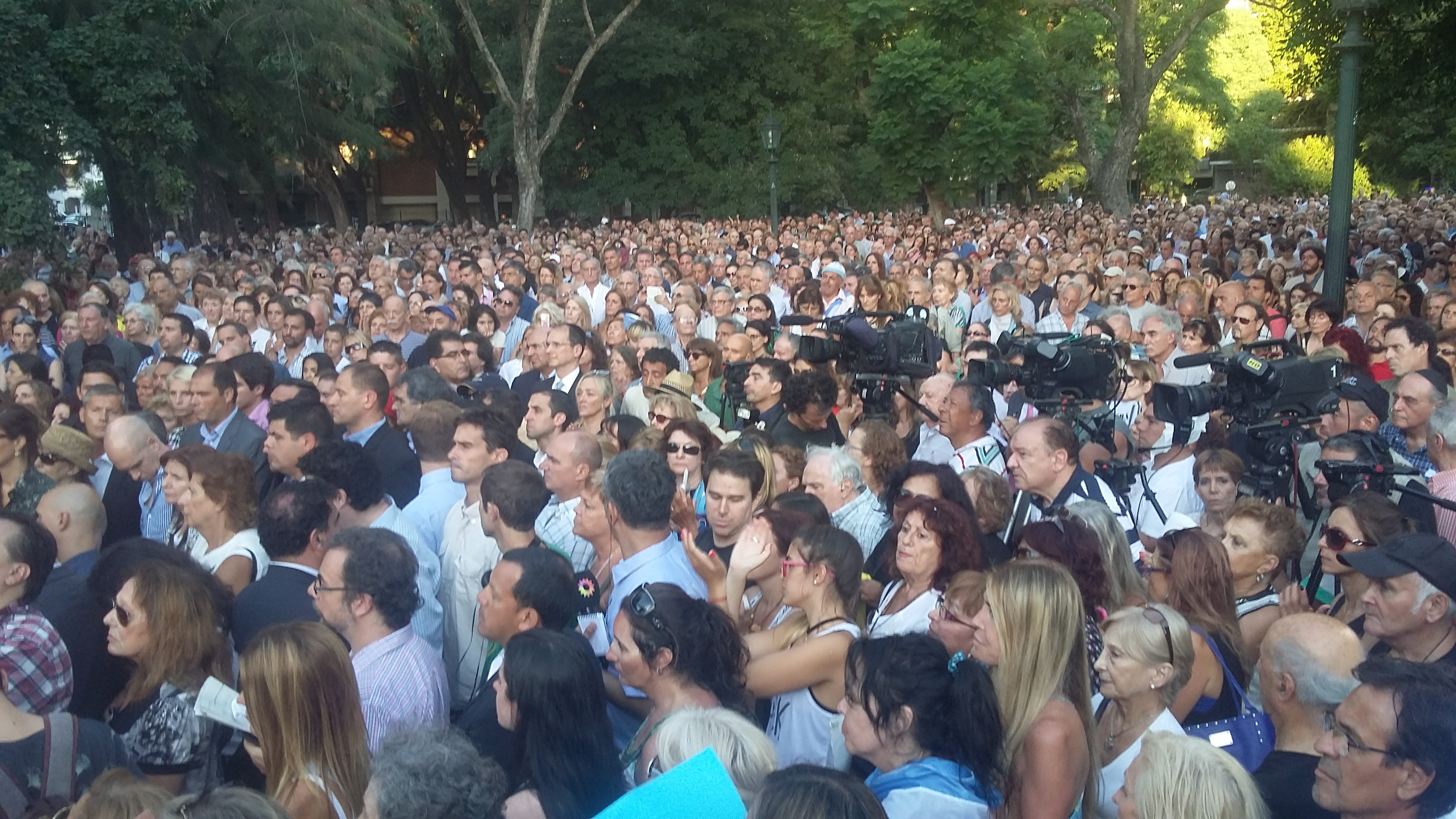
A 2016 assembly dedicated to the memory of Nisman

Nisman was found dead at his home in Puerto Madero, Buenos Aires, on 18 January 2015 next to a Bersa Thunder 22 handgun, just hours before he was due to appear before Congress to discuss the allegations, and six days after publishing the 288-page report. According to the autopsy, Nisman had died the previous afternoon and had an entry bullet wound on the right temple with no exit wound. His body was found inside the bathroom, blocking the door, and there were no signs of forced entry or robbery in the apartment. Nonetheless, a locksmith who arrived at Nisman's apartment was quoted as stating that he found a hidden entrance to the apartment open upon his arrival.

=== Investigation ===
The death of Nisman is under investigation by federal judge Emma Palmaghini and special prosecutor Viviana Fein. A 2017 report determined that the cause of death was murder, a conclusion which federal courts accepted in 2018.

Nisman was found next to a .22 caliber Bersa gun, which has been shown to have been the weapon used to kill him. A single shot had been fired point blank to his head. Nisman had two registered guns, but this gun did not belong to him; it belonged to his assistant Diego Lagomarsino, who lent it to him. Of the other two guns, one was transferred in 2009, and the other has not been found. A paraffin test did not reveal gunshot residue on Nisman's hands, suggesting that he may not have fired the gun himself. The results of such a test, however, may not be conclusive, as the gun involved is of small caliber and may leave no trace. His body did not have signs of a physical attack and Fein commented that there was nothing suggesting the presence of other people at the crime scene. Fein announced on 9 February 2015, however, that DNA from a second person was found on a coffee cup in the kitchen sink.

It is still unknown whether Lagomarsino was the last person to see Nisman alive, and Fein is investigating the security tapes to clarify that point. Nisman's last phone calls are also under investigation. His bodyguards had not been present since the previous Friday and returned that Sunday at noon. Although they received no reply from Nisman, who was dead, they did not report the lack of communication immediately or call 911 and refused the help of medics from the SAME (which deals with medical emergencies).

Nisman had already submitted his complaint and wiretap transcripts to Judge Ariel Lijo on 14 January. It was reported, both in the media and in comments to relatives, that he felt confident about his performance. Nisman had also written a grocery list for the following day, which was also found at the house. One of his last WhatsApp messages, for his relatives and friends, said "Estoy mejor que nunca y más temprano que tarde la verdad triunfa" (Spanish for "I'm better than ever and sooner than later the truth prevails"). Some who knew Nisman well, including Congresswoman Cornelia Schmidt-Liermann, said that he had been living under constant threats on his life since he began his investigation 10 years earlier.

Fein announced on 3 February 2015 that Nisman had drafted warrants for the arrest of President Cristina Fernández de Kirchner and Héctor Timerman, Argentina's Foreign Minister, before his death. The 26-page document was found in the garbage in Nisman's apartment.

Senior Secretariat of Intelligence officer Antonio "Jaime" Stiuso, who conducted many of the wiretaps ordered by Nisman, had been dismissed in a December 2014 agency shakeup and had persuaded Nisman to dismiss his 10-man security detail days before his death. Stiuso presented himself on 18 February for questioning by Special Prosecutor Fein after initially evading the subpoenas. Facing unrelated charges of smuggling, he reportedly fled the country for neighboring Uruguay a week later in a black pickup registered to one of the companies allegedly involved in the smuggling operation.

In June 2015 a video was released of the crime scene investigation showing police allegedly tampering with evidence by neglecting certain precautionary measures.

The incident was first ruled as a suicide by a group of forensic experts appointed by Argentina's Supreme Court in 2015 (during Fernández de Kirchner's government), and then as a homicide by a forensic group of Gendarmerie in 2018, under Macri's government. That same year Nisman's assistant was accused as the prime suspect of Nisman's alleged homicide after providing the murder or suicide weapon and is currently being prosecuted on conspiracy-to-commit-murder charges by a federal judge. Fernandez de Kirchner faced unrelated corruption charges.

In 2023, on appeal, the Federal Chamber of Cassation revoked the dismissal that Cristina Fernández de Kirchner had benefited from and ordered her to be tried for the alleged cover-up for which Alberto Nisman accused her regarding the Argentina-Iran Memorandum of Understanding. The relatives of the victims of the AMIA attack had demanded that the oral trial against the former president be held. The reasons are that "the accused persons are attributed to the organization of a complex criminal plan to achieve or favor the impunity of the Iranian citizens suspected of having participated in the terrorist attack on the AMIA headquarters through two parallel channels, one formal—with the signing of the memorandum of understanding—and another informal, with unofficial negotiations."

In May 2026, Viviana Fein was criminally charged for concealing evidence in the case.

==== Private investigation ====
In early March 2015, a private investigation that was initiated by Nisman's family concluded that Nisman's death was not suicide but was an act of homicide. The report, which was performed by experts of Judge Arroyo Salgado, included photos of Nisman's body and was about 100 pages in length.

On December 21, 2018, Judge Arroyo Salgado resigned to be part of the Complaint in Nisman's death trial.

=== Reactions ===
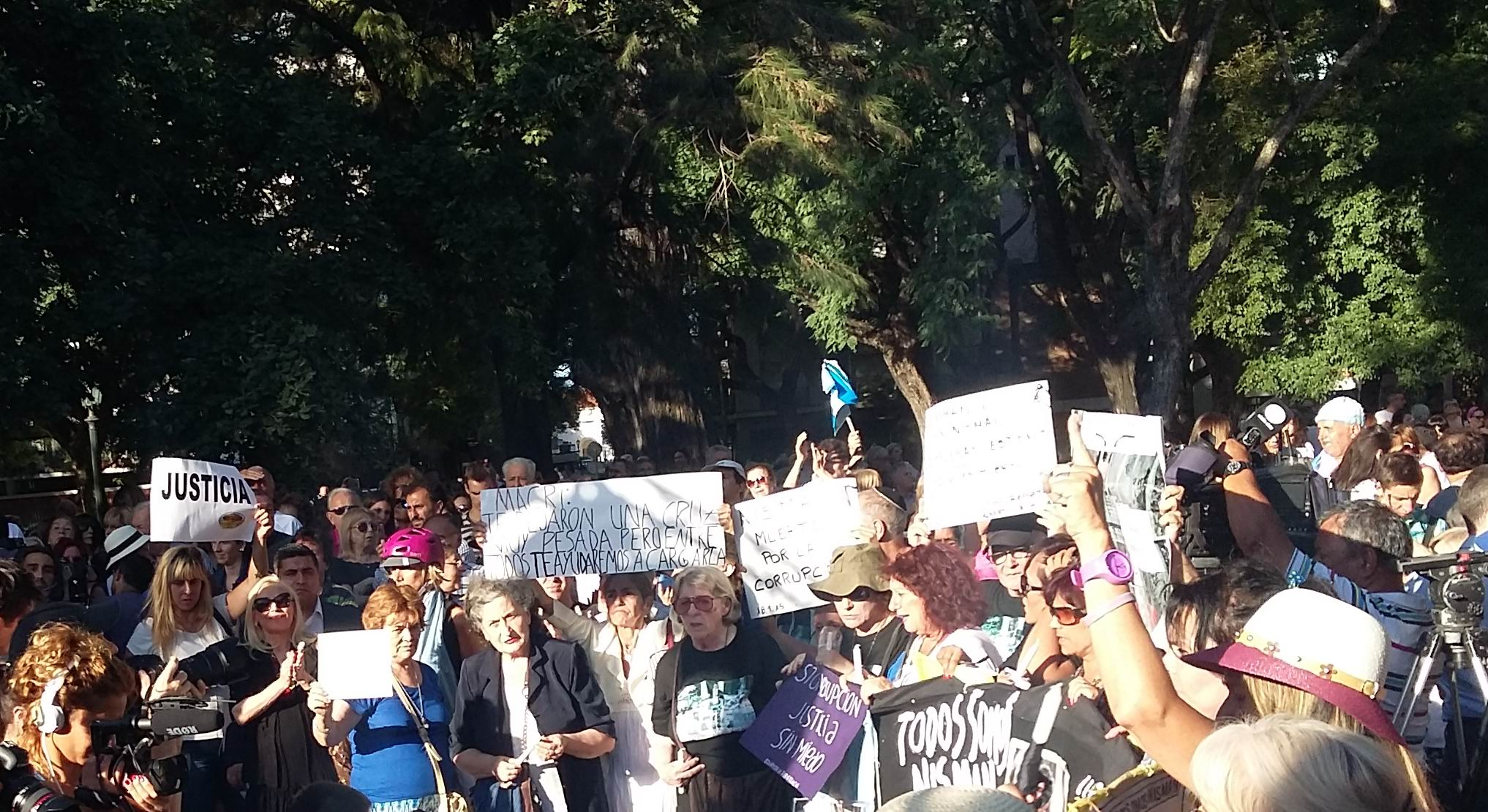
Demonstration asking for justice for Nisman in 2016

Public protests took place following his death, accusing the Argentine government of corruption. Suspicions were raised by the rapidity with which the incident was officially declared a suicide. President Kirchner reversed her initial statement and declared on 22 January 2015 that she believed that it was not a case of suicide.

Nisman's death caused an international stir and captivated media attention throughout the world. A letter was delivered by historian Richard Gott and 29 other British journalists, artists, and intellectuals to the Argentine Embassy in London rejecting the "political use" of either the AMIA bombing or Nisman's death.

In the week following Nisman's death President Kirchner declared her determination to dissolve the Argentine Secretariat of Intelligence in favor of a Federal Intelligence Agency, an agency with new functions and closely controlled by the General Prosecutor's office.

Nisman's best friend, Gustavo Perednik, published two books about Nisman: To Kill Without a Trace (2009) and To Die for Argentina (2015).

== Controversies about Nisman's life ==
=== Alleged political contacts with the CIA, FBI and US Embassy ===
Santiago O'Donnell, an Argentine journalist and writer who published the books Argenleaks and Politileaks, both of which analyse the Wikileaks cable leak concerning Argentina's foreign and domestic policies, stated that during his investigation, he found clear and strong ties and "friendship" between Nisman, the CIA and the Embassy of Argentina in Washington, D.C. According to O'Donnell, the cables revealed Nisman had received recommendation from the US embassy to not investigate the Syrian clues in the AMIA bombing and the local connection of the terrorist attack, and that he was instead to assume certain guilt of Iranian suspects, although no trial had been conducted.

Argentine journalist Facundo Pastor accused Nisman claiming of having longstanding working relationship several USA security agencies, including the FBI. Pastor also states that in the light of his revelations it seems highly plausible that Nisman, instead of having been murdered by Argentina officials as has been widely assumed by the political opponents of Kirchner, committed suicide after all. His main argument for that position consists of the assumption that Nisman might have been purposely abandoned by the FBI and abstained from that agency's supposedly conclusive evidence against Kirchner, in the days leading up to his announcement of prosecuting Kirchner and Timerman. Pastor claims that Nisman might have been abandoned by his USA security contacts because the Obama administration shifted its political priorities from a severe anti-Iran policy towards a negotiated nuclear deal and more relaxed diplomatic ties with Iran as a consequence.

Some analysts claim that there was a "smear campaign" against Nisman for his involvement as prosecutor in the AMIA bombing case.

=== Alleged money laundering and undeclared earnings ===
Following the emerging data in the judicial inquiry into the death of Nisman, the federal prosecutor Juan Zoni asked the judge of the same jurisdiction Rodolfo Canicoba Corral to summon a statement from some relatives or close friends of Nisman people. The order included the mother, Sara Garfunkel, her sister Sandra, former ITF AMIA Diego Lagomarsino, and the businessman Alejandro Picón. The prosecutor said the four defendants have been figureheads of Nisman and that Nisman's real estate was not justified according to the income he received while in office. According to prosecutor Zoni, among those assets that were appointed to third parties are:

- The Audi Q3 car used by Nisman, which was in the name of Palermopack, the company owned by Alejandro Picón.
- The undeclared account in Merrill Lynch bank (New York), with an amount of more than U$S 670,000 attributed to the name of Diego Lagomarsino (Nisman's employee), Sandra Nisman (his sister) and Sara Garfunkel (Nisman's mother).
- A trust for two apartments with two parking garages, which are named after Sara Garfunkel; and two lots of sea farms (chacras) in Punta del Este which are also named after Sara Garfunkel.

Judge Canicoba Corral made the request and set dates for the declarations, but before they were carried out, the Federal Chamber ordered—at the request of Sara Garfunkel—that Canicoba Corral cease to attend the case and that Judge Claudio Bonadio intervene. The reason for the withdrawal was an alleged partiality of the Judge Canicoba Corral, who had previously criticized Nisman and had made remarks in the media assuming Nisman's money laundering to be almost certain.

Diego Lagomarsino, the man who declared that he had given Alberto Nisman the gun from which the mortal shot came out, stated that every month he gave his boss 50 percent of his salary, against his will. He explained to the Justice that he gave the money to Nisman in his hand, in the department of Le Parc of the latter, and without witnesses. Lagomarsino also confirmed that he was co-owning with Nisman a bank account at the Merrill Lynch Bank of New York and that he made money transfers to pay the expenses of a field in Uruguay. The data on Nisman's estate were provided two months after the death, in a letter signed by Lagomarsino and his lawyers and presented to the prosecutor Viviana Fein.

=== Human rights violations in La Tablada barracks ===
The 1989 attack on La Tablada barracks was an assault on the military barracks located in La Tablada, in the province of Buenos Aires, Argentina, by 40 members of Movimiento Todos por la Patria (MTP), an Argentine leftist urban guerrilla group commanded by former ERP leader Enrique Gorriarán Merlo. 39 people were killed and 60 injured by the time the Argentine Army retook the barracks. The MTP carried out the assault under the alleged pretense of preventing a military coup supposedly planned for the end of January 1989 by the Carapintadas, a group of far-right military officers opposed to the investigations concerning Argentina's last civil-military dictatorship (1976–1983), its widespread Human Rights abuses, and the use of State terrorism against civilians.

In 1989, Gerardo Larrambebere (then federal judge of Morón), appointed Nisman as the secretary in charge of the investigation on the allegations of forced disappearance of Iván Ruiz and José Díaz, two of the guerrilla members who participated during the fight on La Tablada barracks. Nisman filed the case due to "lack of evidence". In 1997, the Inter-American Commission on Human Rights ruled that Ruiz and Díaz had been victims of crimes against humanity and that the Argentine State and its Juditial power had failed to comply with its duty to investigate and punish the people responsible. Twenty years later the case was reactivated and the then federal judge of Morón ordered the prosecution and capture of soldiers suspected of having committed the crimes.

In December 2018, during the third hearing of the trial for the human rights violations committed during the recovery of the La Tablada barracks in 1989, a surprising revelation occurred when two soldiers who had participated in the events claimed under oath that Iván Ruiz and José Díaz were captured alive, tortured and then disappeared by the Army (known as Desaparecidos in Argentina). But one of them went further: César Ariel Quiroga, at the time the driver of an ambulance inside the Tablada barracks, reported that he was forced to sign a statement with facts that he did not see and which cleared the name of the military in the disappearance of Ruiz and Díaz. That false testimonial bears the signature of Alberto Nisman, then secretary of the Morón court. During the 2018 trial, Quiroga thanked the court for the "opportunity" to speak up and then explained that in 1990, when he was 23 years old, he signed a testimonial statement before Nisman that "was not" true to what he had declared and that an "auditor of the Army", present in the court of Gerardo Larrambebere had taken him aside before signing, and asked him to consent to the "official version so as not to damage the institution" (i.e., the Argentine Army). That statement was taken in August 1990, in the court that ran Larrambebere, with the secretariat of Nisman: "They gave me two sheets to sign, which they said it was a procedure I had to do in case someone claimed something", Quiroga explained, and he showed the copies that were delivered to him at that time, which are now part of the file and were later submitted to the expert's report, according to Matías Alejandro Mancini, president of Federal Court Nº4 of San Martín. "I signed it because of my young age, because I had been in the institution for a short time, due to pressure and fear", Quiroga added.

=== Sexual harassment lawsuit ===
In March 1991, María Laura S., a 26-year-old lawyer, reported that for eight years she had received anonymous calls so insistent that they prevented the use of her home phone line. The caller refused to cut off the communication and the house phone was blocked. The stalker threatened her and spoke obscenities of all kinds. According to the plaintiff's deposition: "Among the man's descriptions was an insistent obsession with genitality and the size and firmness of the penis". María Laura requested the intervention of her telephone line in order to demonstrate the aggressive and violent content of the calls. The federal judge in charge of the case was the current court of appeals's Judge Martín Irurzun, who was at the time the head of Federal Court No. 5. The prosecutor was Gabriel Cavallo, who later became a federal judge and today works as a private attorney. Judge Irurzun ordered the telephone intervention of the victim's line. In July 1991, he received the first listening sheets, along with several cassettes. The investigation continued, but there was a problem: in 1991, the crime known as "sexual harassment" did not yet exist in Argentine legislation. Therefore, they ended up prosecuting Nisman for "nuisance in telephone communications", since the caller left his phone off the hook after the communications and blocked incoming calls. In the file it was verified that the calls were made from the home of Alberto Nisman's father and that the voice was from Alberto Nisman, who at the time worked in the courts of Morón. An article by Revista Noticias published some of the transcripts found in Juditial records and published in its entirety by journalist Pablo Duggan in his book Who killed Nisman?. The seriousness of the recordings was such that, in those years, two judges tried to mediate with the prosecutor Cavallo so that he "helped" Nisman emerge from this situation successfully. The cause prescribed, but the records remained in place.

In a 2015 book by journalist and news editor Daniel Santoro, it is explained that the charges against Nisman were dropped since it was never wrought to a proper trial for a long time: "Meanwhile, the AMIA prosecutors learned that an attractive woman lawyer had filed a charge of sexual harassment against Nisman. His judicial colleagues were skeptical until they heard the voice recorded on the accusing lawyer’s phone; it was Nisman's. Thanks to judicial bureaucracy and perhaps favors from cronies in the court system, the statute of limitations had lapsed, and the charge was filed away".

In 2018, Lagomarsino stated: "I worked a long time with Nisman, but did not know him. I started to see things that broke the image I had of him, like that he harassed a minor or La Tablada [Human Rights' violations]".

A 2018 article by Mariana Escalada and Agustín Ronconi showed pictures of the judicial record that present a transcript of one of the phone calls, while adding: "Many transcripts are irreproducible due to the pornographic expressions of the man who at the time was insistently calling the young woman lawyer [Nisman's expressions]".

In January 2020, journalist Pablo Duggan stated on a program for the cable news channel C5N that Nisman's sexual harassment was indeed real—showing also the files in the Ministry of Justice as evidence—adding that the harassment of a young woman by Nisman was systematic and mostly done everyday by phone calls; the charges were never wrought to trial, but, according to Duggan, it was one of the secrets Nisman tried to hide away during his entire career, especially in his last days. Duggan also adds that when a judge and a politician were pressuring prosecutor Gabriel Cavallo to stop the investigation against Nisman, Cavallo made them listen to a minute of the recordings: they stopped listening and left the room while saying that "it was disgusting"; Duggan also concluded by saying "Nisman could not be convicted because at the time we [Argentina] had no laws concerning sexual harassment".

== Society and culture ==
On September 23, 2019, a Netflix-produced documentary miniseries premiered at the San Sebastian International Film Festival. This docuseries, titled Nisman: The Prosecutor, the President, and the Spy was directed by British filmmaker Justin Webster, and was made available on the streaming service in January 2020.

A June 2020 segment of the Israeli TV investigative series Uvda ("Fact") alleged that a former Israeli Mossad agent provided incriminating evidence to Nisman in January 2015, reputedly proving that Cristina Fernández de Kirchner was part of a cover-up of Iran's involvement in the AMIA bombing.

== See also ==
- List of unsolved murders (2000–present)
