= Death of Alberto Nisman =

2015 death of Argentine terrorism lawyer

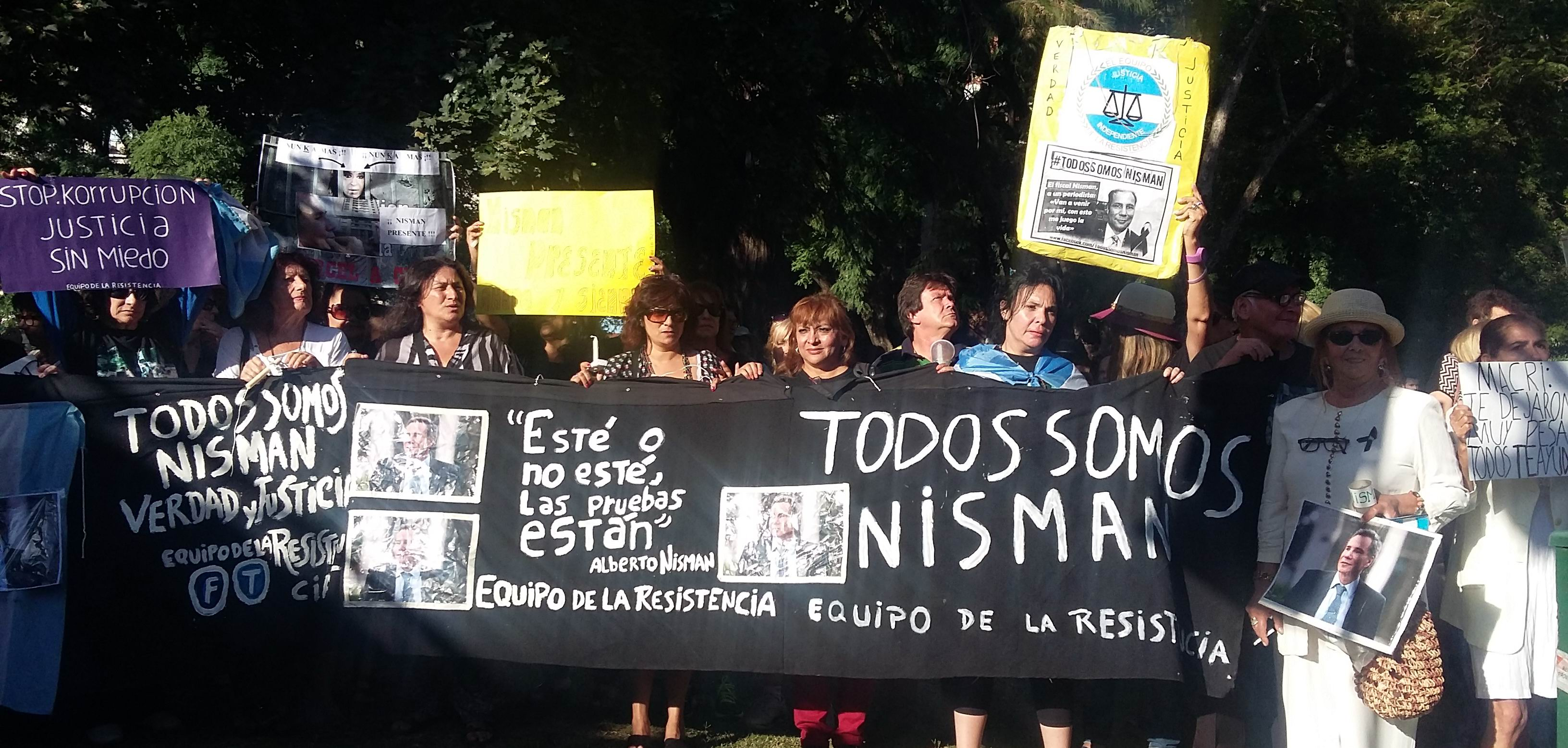
Demonstration one year after his death.

The death of Alberto Nisman, an Argentine lawyer who specialized in international terrorism, became known in the early hours of Monday, January 19, 2015. He was found shot in the head in his apartment in the Torre del Parque building in the upscale Le Parc Puerto Madero development in the neighborhood of Puerto Madero in Buenos Aires.

In September 2017, the National Gendarmerie issued a report concluding that Nisman had been murdered.

The Judge in charge of Nisman's death case since Claudio Bonadio's death in 2020, Julián Ercolini, chose to partially take the Gendarmerie's forensic findings indicating a murder (similarly as with the Federal Chamber and the Court of Cassation) as well as ratifying the presumption of homicide, so that is the figure that still stands nine years after the death of the prosecutor, but far from finding the material authors, the investigation apparently remains determined to only search for whoever gave the alleged order to murder Nisman. Meanwhile, other files that also emerged from the main investigation are completely paralyzed, including a case for alleged money laundering that involves relatives of Nisman and his employee Diego Lagomarsino, a case for an undeclared bank account in New York and purchased lands in Punta del Este, and suspicious real estate ventures in Buenos Aires.

The official report released in 2017 asserted that Nisman was murdered, which contradicts the claims that he committed suicide. It states he was beaten by two persons and shot shortly after.

== Background ==
Natalio Alberto Nisman had been the special prosecutor in charge of the 1994 AMIA bombing investigation since 13 September 2004. The case had been marked by judicial misconduct, and had reached an impasse.

The 2013 signing of a memorandum of understanding with Iran to facilitate the investigation led to a breach between Nisman and President Cristina Fernandez de Kirchner. Nisman alleged that the signing of the memorandum with Iran was part of an effort to cover-up alleged Iranian complicity in the AMIA bombing in exchange for improved trade relations. The accusation was based on Nisman's belief that the administration had petitioned Interpol to lift Red Notices against numerous Iranian officials during the negotiations. The Secretary General of Interpol at the time, Ronald Noble, said on 15 January 2015 that no such requests had been made, and that Foreign Minister Héctor Timerman had stated on each occasion the case was discussed that Interpol should keep the red notices effective, and that "Prosecutor Nisman's assertion is false."

Nisman's body was found 19 January. The discovery of the body came hours before the prosecutor was to present his complaint to the Criminal Law Committee of the Chamber of Deputies; Nisman had already submitted his complaint and wiretap transcripts to Judge Ariel Lijo on 14 January. The Nisman death is under investigation by Federal Judge Emma Palmaghini and Special Prosecutor Viviana Fein. It is unknown if the death was a suicide, a forced suicide, or a murder.

Federal Judge Daniel Rafecas dismissed the Nisman complaint, which had been resubmitted to the courts by Federal Prosecutor Gerardo Pollicita, on 26 February. Judge Rafecas held in his ruling that "none of the two hypotheses of a crime put forward by prosecutor Pollicita in his writ stand up to the minimum level of scrutiny".

Pollicita did not succeed Nisman as chief AMIA prosecutor; this office was headed as of 13 February by a prosecution task force led by coordinator Juan Murray.

== Complaint ==
In a complaint issued on Tuesday January 13, 2015, Nisman accused President Cristina Fernandez de Kirchner, Minister of Foreign Relations Héctor Timerman, deputy Andrés Larroque and the piqueteros Luis D'Elia and Fernando Esteche of concealment. According to Nisman, they had guaranteed impunity of Iran with the memorandum to unblock relations with this country and impute some called "local fascists".

The complaint was based on eavesdropping on an alleged Iranian spy who spoke on different occasions to D'Elia, Esteche, and Larroque, and on Nisman's stated belief that the administration had petitioned Interpol to lift Red Notices against numerous Iranian officials during said negotiations. The Secretary General of Interpol at the time, Ronald Noble, noted on 15 January 2015 however that no such requests had been made, and that "on each occasion that [Foreign Minister Héctor Timerman] and I spoke about the Interpol red notices issued in connection to the AMIA case, [Timerman] stated that Interpol should keep the red notices effective." Noble added on 18 January that "Prosecutor Nisman's assertion is false."

Nisman claimed that Cristina Fernandez had ordered an agent of the "SIDE" (Secretariat of Intelligence) she trusts or Andrés Larroque, and both delivered that to Esteche or to D'Elia. D'Elia communicated to the alleged Iranian agent Alejandro Yussuf Khalil, who telephoned Mohsen Rabbani (one of the parties accused of the 1994 bombing). According to Nisman, the reasons for the orders were intended to overcome "the Argentina energy crisis through an exchange of [Iranian] oil with [Argentine] grains" and "even sell arms [to Iran]". Nisman claimed that to finalize the memorandum, the condition that Interpol red notices against several officials of Iran be rescinded was included, an assertion discredited by Interpol director Ronald Noble. WikiLeaks claims that "WikiLeaks cables also revealed that the U.S. Embassy in Argentina had given Nisman direct orders not to investigate any local connections to the AMIA bombing as well as any Syrian links to same and that he was instead to assume guilt on the part of the Iranian suspects in the case regardless of evidence." but cable actually said "Legatt officers have for the past two years recommended to Nisman that he focus on the perpetrators of the terrorist attack and not on the possible mishandling of the first investigation."

== Death ==
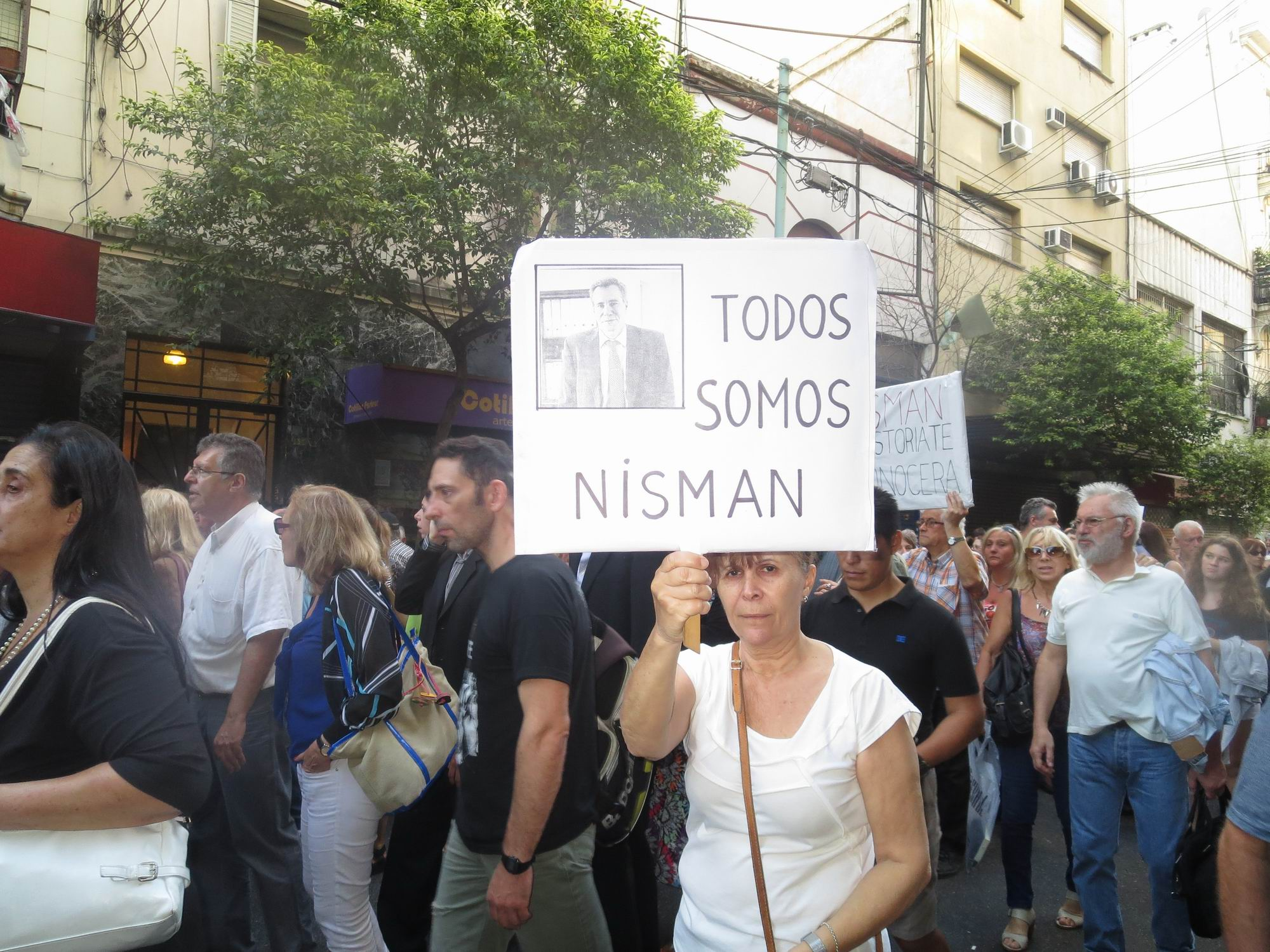
Woman with a sign "We are all Nisman" in a march in Buenos Aires the day after his death.

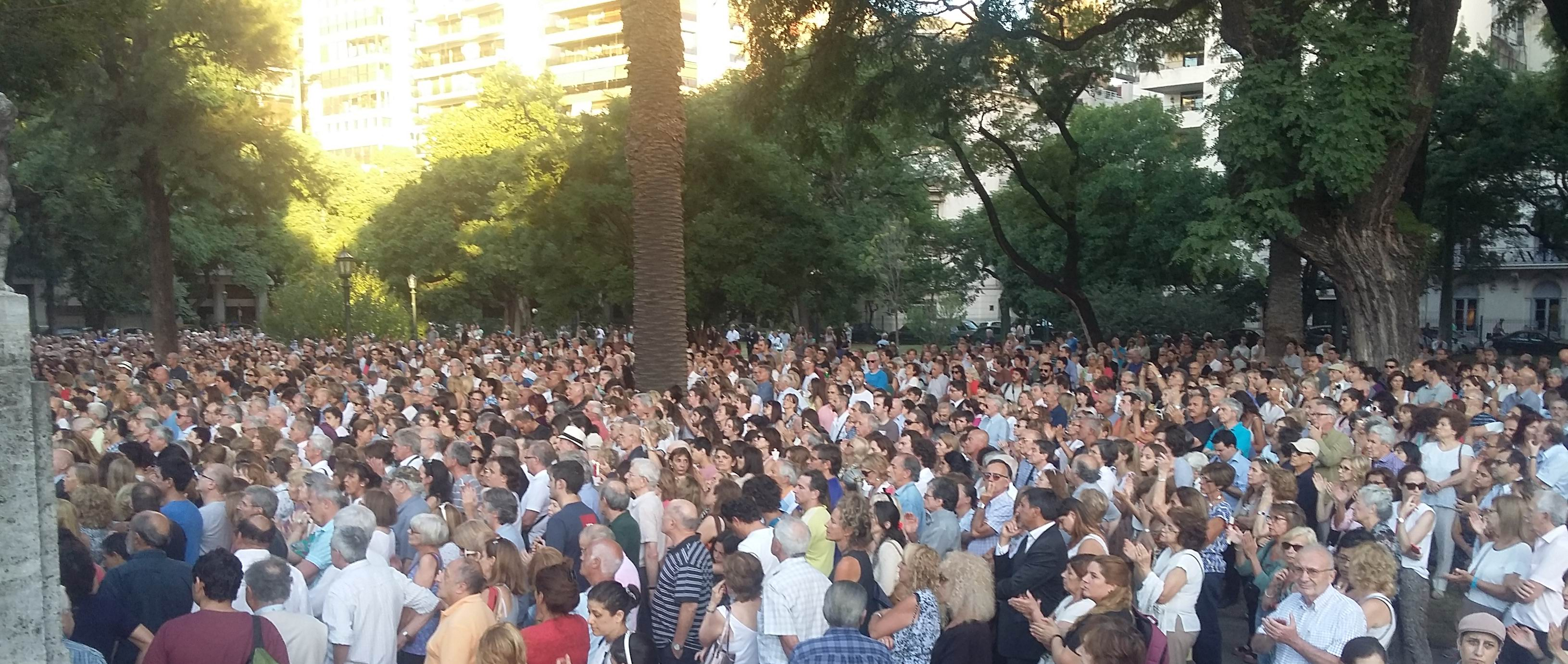
Demonstration one year after his death.

Nisman was found next to a Bersa gun, .22 caliber, in his 13th-floor apartment in the Torre del Parque building within the upscale Le Parc Puerto Madero development located in Puerto Madero, Buenos Aires. At 3 a.m. on Monday, 19 January 2015, after Nisman's mother failed to open the apartment door, a locksmith managed to open a service door which was locked from inside. When they managed to get inside, Nisman's body was found lifeless on the floor of the bathroom, lying against the door, along with a pistol and a cap bullet.

According to the autopsy, Nisman died the previous afternoon and had an entry bullet wound on the right parietal (temple) of his head, two inches above the ear; the bullet remained inside the head with no exit wound. His body was found inside the bathroom and blocking the door, and there were no signs of forced entry or robbery in the apartment. The paraffin test did not reveal any gunshot residue on Nisman's hands, suggesting that he may not have fired the gun himself. The results of such a test, however, may not be conclusive, as the gun involved is of small caliber and may leave no trace. His body did not have signs of physical attack, and Prosecutor Fein commented that there were no items suggesting the presence of other people at the crime scene. Fein announced on 9 February, however, that DNA from a second person was found on a coffee cup in the kitchen sink. Nisman had made numerous cryptic comments shortly before his death, including a WhatsApp message that said "I'm better than ever and sooner than later the truth will prevail".

The gun found did not belong to Nisman. It was registered in the name of an employee of the prosecutor, computer repair technician Diego Lagomarsino. Lagomarsino was a frequent guest at the Nisman residence, and is the last person known to have seen him alive. He last visited Nisman at around 8 p.m. on the day of Nisman's death, and according to Le Parc security records, stayed there as late as 12:54 a.m.

While the .22 caliber weapon that fired the fatal shot belonged to Lagomarsino, he could not explain how no fingerprints of his were present on the weapon, as would be expected. He claimed to have brought it to the apartment upon request, because Nisman distrusted his own custody. Accordingly, Nisman's 10-man security detail were not at home watching when Nisman died. Lagomarsino earned an unusually large salary as Nisman's personal computer technician (40,000 pesos a month during 2014; US$5,000 at the time). He was asked in a 5 February press conference if he had a homosexual relationship with Nisman as well as a professional one, which he denied. Senator Salvador Cabral stated on 25 February that he had proof to that effect, and was subpoenaed by prosecutor Fein to provide an affidavit.

Senior Secretariat of Intelligence officer Antonio "Jaime" Stiusso, who conducted many of the wiretaps ordered by Nisman, had been dismissed in a December 2014 agency shakeup and had persuaded Nisman to dismiss his 10-man security detail days before his death. Stiusso presented himself on 18 February for questioning by Special Prosecutor Fein after initially evading the subpoenas. Facing unrelated charges of smuggling, he reportedly fled the country for neighboring Uruguay a week later in a black pickup registered to one of the companies allegedly involved in the smuggling operation.

Nisman's death caused an international stir and appeared in many news media worldwide. The death generated more than a million tweets.

The prosecutor in the case said: "There are no witnesses, and no neighbors who could provide data on what happened". It remains unknown if the death was a suicide, a forced suicide, or a murder. Following his death there were massive protests across the country demanding justice and uncovering the cause of death.

The official report released in 2017, concluded that Nisman was murdered which contradicts previous government claims that he committed suicide. It states he was assaulted by two people, beaten and shot.

In May 2026, Viviana Fein was criminally charged for concealing evidence in the case.

== 18F ==
On the 18 February 2015, there was a silent demonstration, convened by the Attorney congregation and federal attorney, in various cities in Argentina and abroad, in order to commemorate the death of Nisman a month earlier. An estimated 400,000 marched in silence in Buenos Aires in torrential rains to honour and mark his death.

== See also ==
- List of unsolved murders (2000–present)
