= 13N =

13N may refer to:

- 13N (Argentina), a protest in Argentina
- The November 2015 Paris attacks
- The Trinca Airport in New Jersey
- Nitrogen-13 (^{13}N), an isotope of nitrogen
- Konstal 13N, a tram produced in Polish People's Republic

== See also ==
- N13 (disambiguation)
