= Diana Graciela Goral =

Argentine lawyer

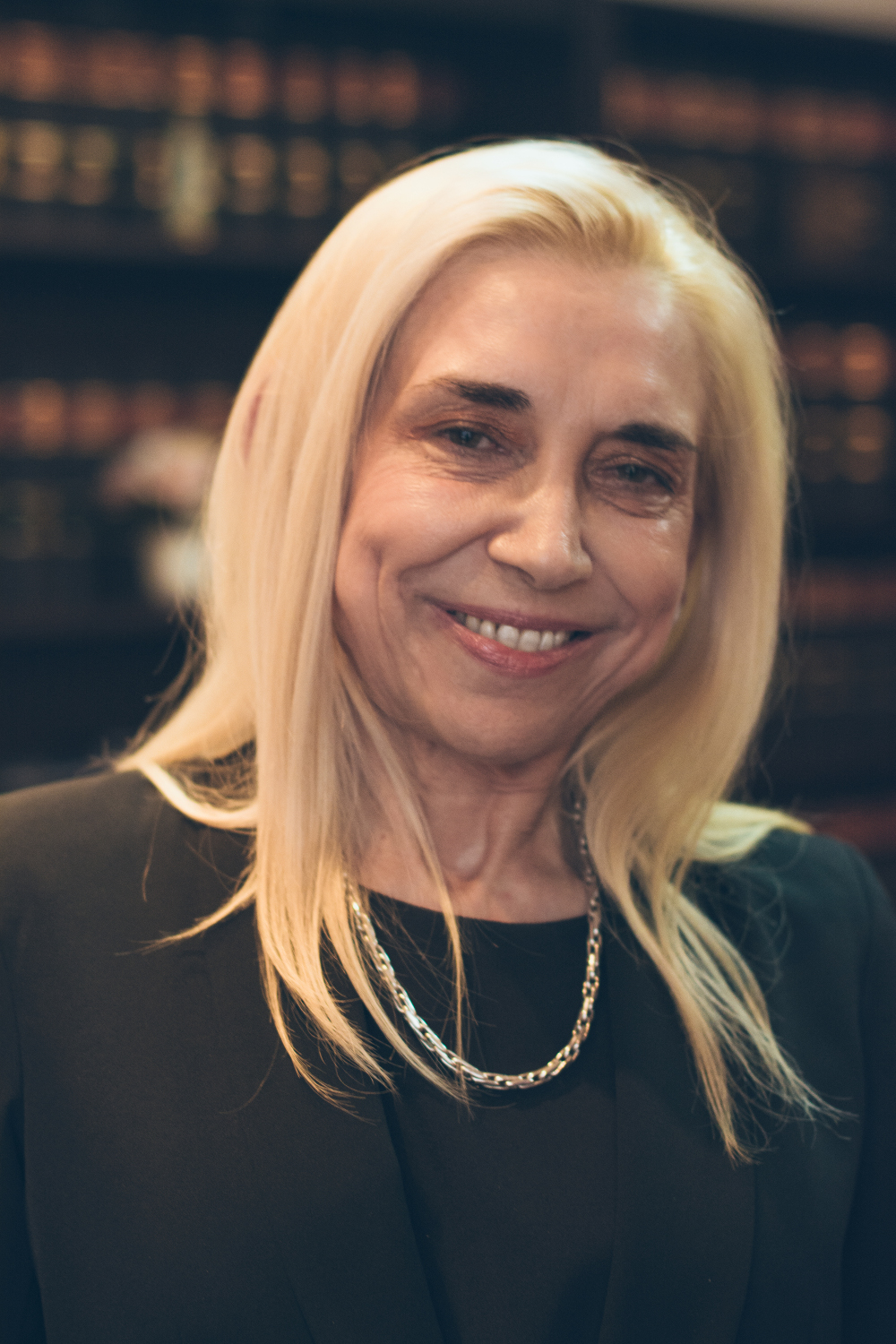
Fiscal General Diana Goral

Diana Graciela Goral is an Argentine lawyer. She is a professor of Elements of Criminal Law and Criminal Procedure at the University of Buenos Aires, as well as a tenured professor of Criminal Law General Part and Criminal Law Special Part at the University of Salta. She has also been a general attorney in the Criminal Oral Court of Buenos Aires (DF) since 1993.

== Early life and education ==
Goral graduated as a lawyer from the Universidad Católica de La Plata, and then did a postgraduate degree in "Improvement in narcotics and psychotropics" at the Universidad Católica de Salta and the University of Bari Aldo Moro (CEE). In 1999, she completed the "Complex Research Seminar" sponsored by the FBI and the United States Embassy.

== Legal career ==
Goral's career began in 1980 as First Instance Secretary of the Court of Civil, Commercial, and Labor Instruction in Charata, in the province of Chaco. She was later designated First Instance and Second Instance Secretary of the Correctional Court in the Chaco seat of Villa Ángela. In 1984, she was named Electoral Secretary of the Chamber of Crime no. 2 in the city of Resistencia.

Goral has been a general attorney in the Criminal Oral Court of Buenos Aires (DF) since 1993. She is a consultant expert analyst on gender violence, organized crime, information crimes, and medical responsibility. She is a full member of the International Association of Penal Law, based in France.

She is a professor of Elements of Criminal Law and Criminal Procedure at the University of Buenos Aires, as well as a tenured professor of Criminal Law General Part and Criminal Law Special Part at the University of Salta.

Goral was one of the organizers of the 18F March demonstration in February 2015, in memory of Alberto Nisman.

== Publications ==
Goral's publications include the book Imputabilidad disminuida, and essays such as "El Crimen Organizado en el Mercosur" (L.I.R.A, 1999), "El desbaratamiento de Derechos acordados y su relación con las obligaciones en el Derecho Civil" (Plus Ultra, 2002).
