= 8N =

2012 anti-government protest against Cristina Fernández de Kirchner in November

- People protesting next to the Buenos Aires Metropolitan Cathedral, and flying flags of Argentina
- Date: November 8, 2012
- Location: Argentina

8N was the name given to a massive anti-Kirchnerism protest in several cities in Argentina, including Buenos Aires, Córdoba, Rosario, Mendoza, Olivos, among many others throughout Greater Buenos Aires and other regions; on 8 November 2012. There were also protests in Argentine embassies and consulates in cities such as New York, Miami, Madrid, Sydney, Bogotá, Santiago de Chile, Naples, Zurich and Barcelona, among others. The protest was considered not only a call to Kirchnerism, but also to the opposition, because they did not have a strong leader.

== The event ==
The main points where protests occurred within the city.

Only in the City of Buenos Aires, there were hundreds of thousands of protesters. Most of them stayed in the surroundings of the Obelisk. In Olivos, more than 30,000 protesters gathered outside the official residence of the President. The protest, considered a cacerolazo, gathered up, according to several sources, over 2 million people across the country, the biggest and noisiest anti-government demonstration in a decade. Protesters rejected inflation, corruption, media controls, a possible re-election by Fernández and insecurity; without party identification. People were convened by social networking sites, such as Facebook and Twitter, but also text messages, e-mails and instant messengers.

=== Sites ===
==== Autonomous city of Buenos Aires ====
The main meeting point was the Obelisk. 9 de Julio Avenue had to stop the traffic and led to a huge mass of protesters. The first place where a crowd carrying a huge flag was seen was in Santa Fe and Callao, from there they marched to the Microcentro. A mass of people come and went through Avenida de Mayo, which connects the Obelisk with Plaza de Mayo. Plaza de Mayo was also an epicenter of the protest. The surrounding streets of the Obelisk and 9 de Julio Avenue were also full of protesters. There were also concentrations in Belgrano, Recoleta, Monserrat, Balvanera and Caballito.

==== Provinces ====
Main city protests in the country (excluding Buenos Aires).

===== Buenos Aires =====
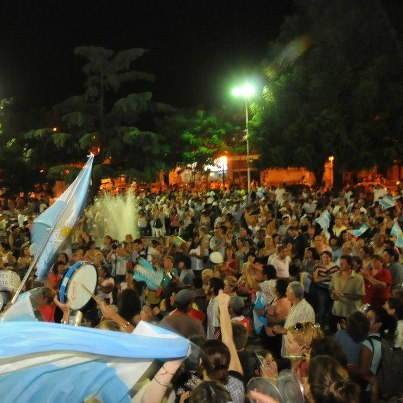
San Miguel, province of Buenos Aires, November 8

In Greater Buenos Aires, the rally was historic. In La Matanza, around 7 thousand people marched to a corner in Ramos Mejía. The most common concerns were "re-election" and crime. Other concentration points were San Justo, Lomas del Mirador and Tapiales. Before 8PM, people gathered in the centre of Quilmes banging pots and honks. Other cities include Lomas de Zamora and Avellaneda.

In Olivos, a surprising 30 thousand people gathered around the Presidential Residence, while Cristina Fernández met with Héctor Timerman. Around 7 PM, Villate Street closed to traffic and noisy protesters arrived.

Protests also erupted in Mar del Plata, where people got together around the Central Casino, icon of the city. Bahía Blanca also hosted a cacerolazo.

In La Plata, thousands of people, mainly families, concentrated in Plaza Moreno, in front of the Cathedral, and 51 Street, in front of the Governorship and the Legislature to claim more safety.

===== Catamarca =====
In San Fernando del Valle de Catamarca, people attired with Argentine flags demonstrated in Plaza 25 de Mayo in front of the provincial Government House.

===== Chaco =====
Thousands of people also demonstrated in Chaco. They mobilized in the cities of Resistencia, Presidencia Roque Sáenz Peña, Charata and Quitilipi In Resistencia, the demonstration occurred in front of mainmast in Plaza 25 de Mayo, where they waved Argentine flags and banners with various claims to President Fernández.

===== Chubut =====
In Trelew, about one thousand people concentrated in Plaza Independencia, with banners against re-election. In Puerto Madryn, 700 protesters marched to the Welch Woman Monument. Protests also erupted in Comodoro Rivadavia.

===== Córdoba =====
More than 40 thousand people in Patio Olmos, the corner between San Juan Boulevard and Vélez Sarsfield; and also in Cerro de las Rosas. In the interior of Córdoba there were massive concentrations in Villa Carlos Paz, Jesús María and Villa María, among others. In Río Cuarto, 7 thousand people participated, according to the police. In Villa Allende around 500 neighbors mobilized, a similar figure that in Cosquín's main square. In La Falda 400 people protested, and in Alta Gracia only 150. In Villa Dolores, they did not reach the hundred.

===== Corrientes =====
The cacerolazo that correntinos carried out expressed criticisms to the National Government that, in general, agreed to the claim of "stop", "we don't want to be Cuba nor Venezuela" and "no to the re-election". Those were some of the banners that could be read in the concentration which took place on the waterfront avenue of Corrientes, between San Juan and La Rioja streets.

===== La Pampa =====
A torrential storm that fell on Santa Rosa struck in the call to the Plaza San Martin: there were about 200 people.

===== La Rioja =====
Approximately 500 people protested in front of the provincial Government Palace, in the capital's main square.

===== Mendoza =====
Around 20 thousand people gathered in the capital's pedestrian street and in the area known as "Kilometre 0" in the city of San Rafael despite the hot weather caused by the arrival of the Zonda wind.

===== Misiones =====
In Posadas, the provincial capital, more than two thousand people rallied in front of the provincial Government Palace. There were also protests in Puerto Iguazú, Eldorado, Oberá and Apóstoles.

===== Neuquén =====
In the capital, two thousand people protested in the San Martín monument.

===== Río Negro =====
Curiously, 8N protesters and participants of Tradition Day, an event funded by the Government, converged in the Bariloche Civic Center. 500 people protested regardless the celebrations.

===== Salta =====
In Salta, 5 thousand people gathered in Güemes Square, in front of the Provincial Legislature. They held banners calling for "no more lies", "enough with the stealing" and "no re-election".

===== San Juan =====
Demonstrators filled Plaza 25 de Mayo of the provincial capital. After marching through the central streets and around the square, protesters stopped in front of the Cathedral where they loudly sang the national anthem. The legends of the signs pointed to several claims, but crime and economic measures were the most cited.

== See also ==
- 18A
- 13N
- 18F
- 17A
