= Stanley Sylvester =

Anglo-Argentine cricketer, businessman, and diplomat (1912–2003)

Personal information
- Full name: Stanley Mainwaring Farrar Sylvester
- Born: 13 June 1912; Rosario, Santa Fe, Argentina
- Died: 20 October 2003 (aged 91); Rosario, Santa Fe, Argentina
- Batting: Unknown

Career statistics
| Competition | First-class |
|---|---|
| Matches | 1 |
| Runs scored | 25 |
| Batting average | 12.50 |
| 100s/50s | –/– |
| Top score | 21 |
| Catches/stumpings | –/– |
- Source: Cricinfo, 28 January 2022

Stanley Mainwaring Farrar Sylvester (13 June 1912 — 20 October 2003) was an Anglo-Argentine first-class cricketer, businessman and diplomat.

Sylvester was born at Rosario in June 1912. He was educated in England at Cheltenham College, before returning to Argentina after completing his education. Sylvester played first-class cricket for Argentina in January 1938, making a single appearance against Sir T. E. W. Brinckman's touring XI at Buenos Aires. Batting twice in the match, he was dismissed in the Argentine first innings for 4 runs by Jim Sims, while in their second innings he was dismissed for 21 runs by the same bowler.

Sylvester was the honorary British consul at Rosario, a role he carried out alongside his management of a meat processing plant owned by the Swift Company, which in 1970 had laid off 15,000 workers. He was abducted in May 1971 from his home by guerrillas affiliated to the People's Revolutionary Army (PRA); his abduction was initially thought to be retaliation for the 15,000 job losses, with the group stating he would be "tried before a people's court of justice". The kidnapping was planned without the permission of the PRA national command. The Rosario PRA demanded that the Swift Company rehire 300 workers, reduce work quotas for their workers, terminate the indiscriminate firing of workers, provide medical attention to employees, reduce the cold working conditions in the packing plant, distribute $50,000 worth of food to working-class neighbourhoods, and publish their communiqués in public media. After one week their demands were met, with Sylvester being released. In November 2003, former PRA guerrilla Enrique Gorriarán Merlo travelled to Rosario to apologise to Sylvester for his 1971 kidnapping, but Sylvester had died 20 days prior on 20 October 2003; he instead issued an apology to his son, Juan.
