= 1989 attack on La Tablada barracks =

Guerrilla attack on the Argentine Army

Coordinates: 34°41′56″S 58°32′10″W

Attack on La Tablada barracks
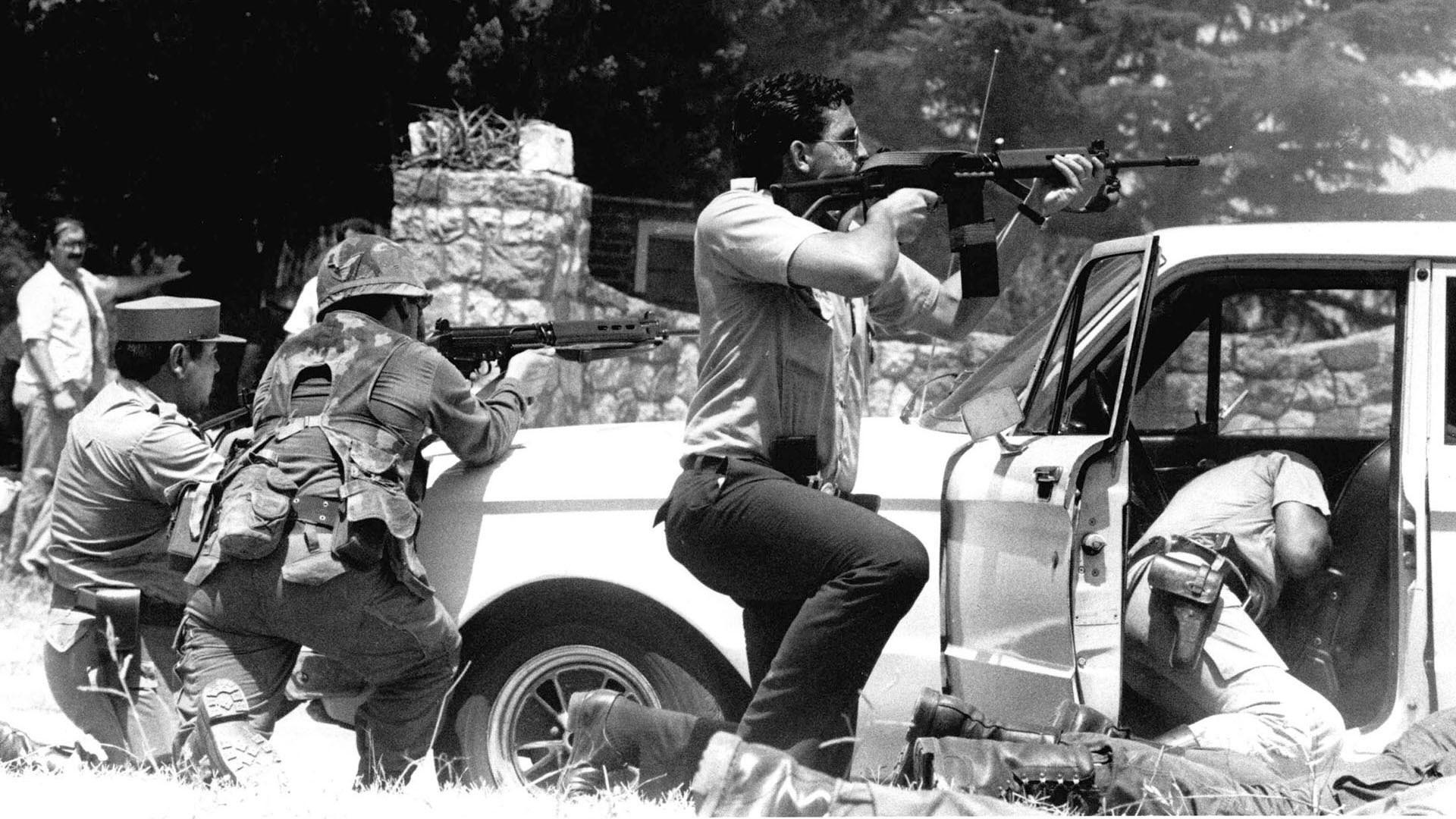
- Policemen and Army Personnel fire back at MTP rebels
Date	23–24 January 1989
Location	La Tablada, Buenos Aires Province, Argentina
Result	Argentine government victory

Belligerents
(Argentina) Argentine government: Argentine Army; Buenos Aires Province Police	Movimiento Todos por la Patria

Commanders and leaders
Raúl Alfonsín; Francisco Gassino	Enrique Gorriarán Merlo

Strength
3,600 soldiers and policemen	46 fighters

Casualties and losses
11 killed (9 soldiers and 2 policemen); 53 wounded	28 killed
- 2 civilians and 1 horse killed 4 civilians wounded

The 1989 Attack on La Tablada barracks also known as the Battle of La Tablada occurred on 23 and 24 January 1989 when 40 members of Movimiento Todos por la Patria (MTP) attacked the military barracks in La Tablada, in Buenos Aires Province, Argentina. 39 people were killed and 60 injured by the time the Argentine army retook the barracks. The MTP was commanded by former ERP leader Enrique Gorriarán Merlo. It carried out the assault under the alleged pretense of preventing a military coup supposedly planned for the end of January 1989 by the Carapintadas, a group of military officers who opposed the investigations and trials concerning Argentina's last civil-military dictatorship (1976–1983).

The Argentine president of the time, Raúl Alfonsín declared that the attack, which carried the ultimate goal of sparking a massive popular uprising, could have led to a civil war. Given a life sentence and imprisoned, as were his comrades, in high security quarters, Gorriarán Merlo was eventually freed in 2003. He died on 22 September 2006 while awaiting surgery for an abdominal aortic aneurysm.

== The assault on the barracks ==
On 23 January 1989, a group of approximatively 40 members of the Movimiento Todos por la Patria ("All for the Fatherland" Movement, "MTP", founded in 1986 by former ERP leader Enrique Gorriarán Merlo) attacked the 3rd Mechanized Infantry Regiment barracks in La Tablada (Regimiento de Infantería Mecanizada Nº 3, RIM3). They broke into the barracks by ramming a stolen truck into the main gate, followed by several other vehicles.

According to Clarín newspaper, three different versions about the attack exist. Ten days before the assault, lawyer and MTP member Jorge Baños had declared in a conference that the Carapintadas were planning a coup for the end of January. The Carapintadas were members of the Armed Forces that had rebelled against the national government three times in 1987 and 1988, protesting the investigations on human rights abuses during the "National Reorganization Process" (1976–1983). This has remained to this day the MTP's version, held in particular by the late Gorriarán Merlo who claimed that the MTP was fulfilling the constitutional obligation of "bear[ing] arms in defense of the fatherland and of [the] Constitution".

The official report on the attack by head of the Army Francisco Gassino claimed in contrary that it was the MTP, formed of several former ERP members, that had planned a coup. A last version claims that the MTP was victim of a manipulation by intelligence services. A sociologist and professor who published an investigation into the attack believes the MTP had wider aims: "They weren’t planning to put down a coup. They were creating the false image of a coup, to set the scene, but were planning to take the barracks and from there start a revolution."

The Argentine Army, assisted by the Buenos Aires Police (a total of 3,600 personnel) was called on to counterattack, and indiscriminately used white phosphorus (WP) in the zone, in violation of the Geneva Conventions, which in civil wars are only binding with the consent of both parties, and not at all in police actions. The use of WP in combat is forbidden by international law. In this case, it had the effect of completely burning the barracks and of carbonizing corpses. 39 people were killed and 60 injured during the attack (the majority by conventional weapons). Nine were military personnel, two were police officers and the 28 remaining were members of the MTP. Lawyer Jorge Baños was among the dead. In addition, 53 soldiers and police were wounded in the fighting.

The following day, President Raúl Alfonsín (UCR, 1983–89) visited the site, protected by Argentine Army commandos, along with the federal judge of Morón, Gerardo Larrambebere, who is today member of the court presiding over the 1994 AMIA bombing case.

== Alleged human rights violations ==
Retired sergeant José Almada, who had participated in the capture of the MTP members, declared in 2004 that Iván Ruiz and José Díaz had been tortured. According to sergeant Almada, they referred to two persons who were not members of their brigade, and most probably SIDE agents. He identified one of them as Jorge Varando, chief of security of HSBC corporation in Buenos Aires during the December 2001 events. Furthermore, sergeant Almada declared that he had clearly heard a radio conversation ordering to kill two of the captured prisoners. He also said that adjutant sergeant Esquivel, killed during the attack, had been in fact shot by the Army itself, after trying to get to his brother who had been taken prisoner. Sergeant Almada explicitly denounced the OAS report written by Jorge Varando and General Arrillaga, the highest-ranking official in charge of the repression, which aimed at disguising adjutant sergeant Esquivel's suspicious death.

José Almada said that he had tried to inform his hierarchy about these human rights violations, in accordance with article 194 of the Military Justice Code, but that they ignored him. He notably tried to inform General Martín Balza. He also informed head of Argentine Army, General Bonifacio Cáceres, also telling him about his concerns that his neighbours were insulting him, saying that they were responsible of new cases of desaparecidos. Moreover, in his complaint before justice, he also said he had informed former head of the Army Ricardo Brinzoni. After Cáceres's retirement in 1989, colonel Gasquet threatened José Almada of 40 days of arrest — he was finally given two days of arrest on charges of wearing a beard, and then sent him to Paraná, Entre Ríos. Later, he was again sentenced to 30 days of arrest, confined to Crespo near Paraná and finally forced to retire. He still claims to this day he is still being "persecuted".

The MTP guerrillas were also accused of human rights violations. As a conscript serving in the 3rd Infantry Regiment, Eduardo Navascues was taken prisoner early in the assault and suffered shrapnel wounds in the fighting that followed. Despite having been shot several years later in an attempt to silence him, he has given testimony in a recent court case alleging human rights abuses including physical and mental torture at the hand of the guerrillas. Another conscript, Private Víctor Eduardo Scarafiocco claimed that he and others were used as human shields by the guerrillas and that Private Héctor Cardozo was killed as a result.

== Convictions ==
Twenty surviving members of the MTP were later convicted and given sentences ranging from 10 years to life imprisonment. They were judged under the Ley de Defensa de la Democracia (Argentina) (Defense of the Democracy Act) which deprive them of a right to appeal and to a new trial.

Enrique Gorriarán Merlo was given a life sentence, and his ex-wife, Ana María Sívori, was sentenced to 18 years of imprisonment. During the oral and public trial, Gorriarán put into question the legitimacy of the process and objected to the circumstances of his capture in the suburbs of Mexico City in October 1995, which he called a "kidnapping". He was charged with being co-author of qualified illicit association, rebellion, usurpation, homicide with aggravated circumstances, aggravated illegal privation of freedom and reiterated injuries. His ex-wife Sívori was charged with being co-author of qualified illicit association, and secondary participant to offenses of rebellion, doubly aggravated homicide, tentative of homicide, aggravated theft, reiterated injuries and co-author of the use of false identity documents.

Most of those convicted in the attacks were placed in a maximum security cell block on the eighteenth floor of the Caseros prison in Buenos Aires.

Finally, President Fernando de la Rúa (Alliance for Work, Justice and Education, 1999–2001) commuted the prison sentences. And two days before Néstor Kirchner's access to his functions, Interim President Eduardo Duhalde (member of the Justicialist Party) freed Gorriarán Merlo, on 23 May 2003, after 14 years of prison in high security quarters, who declared that it was "an act of justice". Gorriarán Merlo died of a cardiac arrest at the Hospital Argerich in Buenos Aires, while he was about to be operated of an abdominal aortic aneurysm, on 22 September 2006, at the age of 64.

== See also ==
- History of Argentina
- Carapintadas
- Enrique Gorriarán Merlo
- Dirty War
- ERP
- White phosphorus (weapon)
