= 13N (Argentina) =

2014 anti-government protest against Cristina Fernández de Kirchner

The 13N was a Cacerolazo against President Cristina Fernández de Kirchner that took place in Argentina on November 13, 2014. It was organized by social networks. The people in the demonstration protested against the high crime rate, the high inflation and the corruption scandals. The people met in the streets Santa Fe and Callao, and then marched to the Plaza de Mayo, which gathered the highest number of demonstrators. There was a strong security network at the Plaza de Mayo and the Congressional Plaza. The demonstration a lower number of demonstrators than previous ones such as the 8N and the 18A.

Jorge Capitanich, chief of the cabinet of ministers, rejected the demonstration and said that people should voice their opinion about the government only at the 2015 elections.
