= Enrique Gorriarán Merlo =

Argentine guerrilla leader (1941–2006)

Enrique Haroldo Gorriarán Merlo (18 October 1941 – 22 September 2006) was an Argentine guerrilla leader, born in San Nicolás de los Arroyos, Buenos Aires Province.

His family was affiliated with the Radical Civic Union, but at the age of 27 Gorriarán Merlo joined the Marxist Workers Revolutionary Party (PRT), and then cofounded its armed wing, the People's Revolutionary Army (ERP). He continued to be a leader of the PRT and the ERP through to the beginning of the Argentine Dirty War, spanning the governments of Héctor José Cámpora (1973), Juan Perón, and Isabel Perón, the last of which was cut short by the coup that started the military dictatorship known as the National Reorganization Process (1976).

Prior to joining the insurgency around 1970, he lived in Rosario, 70 km north of his birthplace, and worked for two years in the Swift meat packing plant. In an interview, he alleged that insurgent organizations gained thousands of recruits in the area at the time. There, Gorriarán Merlo led the first armed attack by ERP, the capture of Police Station No. 24, in 1971.

Soon afterwards, he was captured and imprisoned in Rawson, Chubut. He was part of the group of militants that organized the prison break that occurred during the night of 15 August 1972. Only six out of 110 were able to make a successful escape by hijacking a commercial flight; 19 were recaptured, and 16 were executed (see Trelew massacre). The successful ones, Gorriarán Merlo among them, fled to Chile, at that time under the Socialist administration of Salvador Allende, and from there were granted safe passage to Cuba. He returned to Argentina a few months later. In January 1974, he took part in the assault on the army barracks in Azul, Buenos Aires Province, where a Lieutenant Colonel, his wife and a conscript were killed.

After the fall of Isabel Perón's government in March 1976, the largely defeated ERP fled the country in order to reorganize itself. Gorriarán Merlo moved to Nicaragua to collaborate with the Sandinistas, and in 1980 he was involved in the assassination of the deposed Nicaraguan President, Anastasio Somoza Debayle, who was living in exile in Asunción, Paraguay. In the last years of his life, he was prohibited entry into Nicaragua, but enjoyed the support and friendship of the Sandinista leader Daniel Ortega.

In 1985, Gorriarán Merlo founded the Movimiento Todos por la Patria (MTP). He returned to Argentina in 1987. The MTP organized the 1989 attack on La Tablada Regiment, where 39 people were killed, among them several conscript soldiers and police officers. Gorriarán Merlo was arrested in Mexico in 1995. He was sentenced to life imprisonment in 1996 and spent eight years in the Devoto prison.

While in prison, he wrote a memoir of his militant years, which was published in January 2003. Along with other former guerrilla leaders, he was pardoned in May 2003 by President Eduardo Duhalde.

In November 2003, he went to Rosario and met the son of Stanley Sylvester, former manager of the Swift meat packing plant, who was the first person kidnapped by the ERP in 1971. Sylvester had died weeks earlier. Gorriarán Merlo claimed that he had always wanted to speak to him and apologize.

Near the end of his life, he publicly stated that he would not choose to return to armed struggle, and tried to obtain political support to run for president in 2007. To this end, in 2005, before the legislative elections, he launched the Party for Work and Development (Partido del Trabajo y el Desarrollo) before a throng in Rosario, with the avowed goals of "closing the gap that separates the people from politics and the rich from the poor", "opposing neoliberalism" and supporting "Latin American integration".

Gorriarán Merlo died of cardiac arrest at the Hospital Argerich in Buenos Aires while awaiting surgery for an abdominal aortic aneurysm on 22 September 2006, at the age of 64.
