= N13 =

N13 may refer to

== Roads ==
- N13 road (Ireland)
- National Route 13 (Morocco)
- Nebraska Highway 13, United States
- Route 13 (Laos)
- Route nationale 13, France

== Other uses ==
- Bloomsburg Municipal Airport, in Pennsylvania, United States
- BMW N13, an automobile engine
- LNER Class N13, a class of British steam locomotives
- London Buses route N13
- Nissan Pulsar (N13), an automobile
- Nitrogen-13, an isotope of nitrogen
- N13, a postcode district in the N postcode area
