= Hernán Lombardi =

Argentine politician and civil engineer

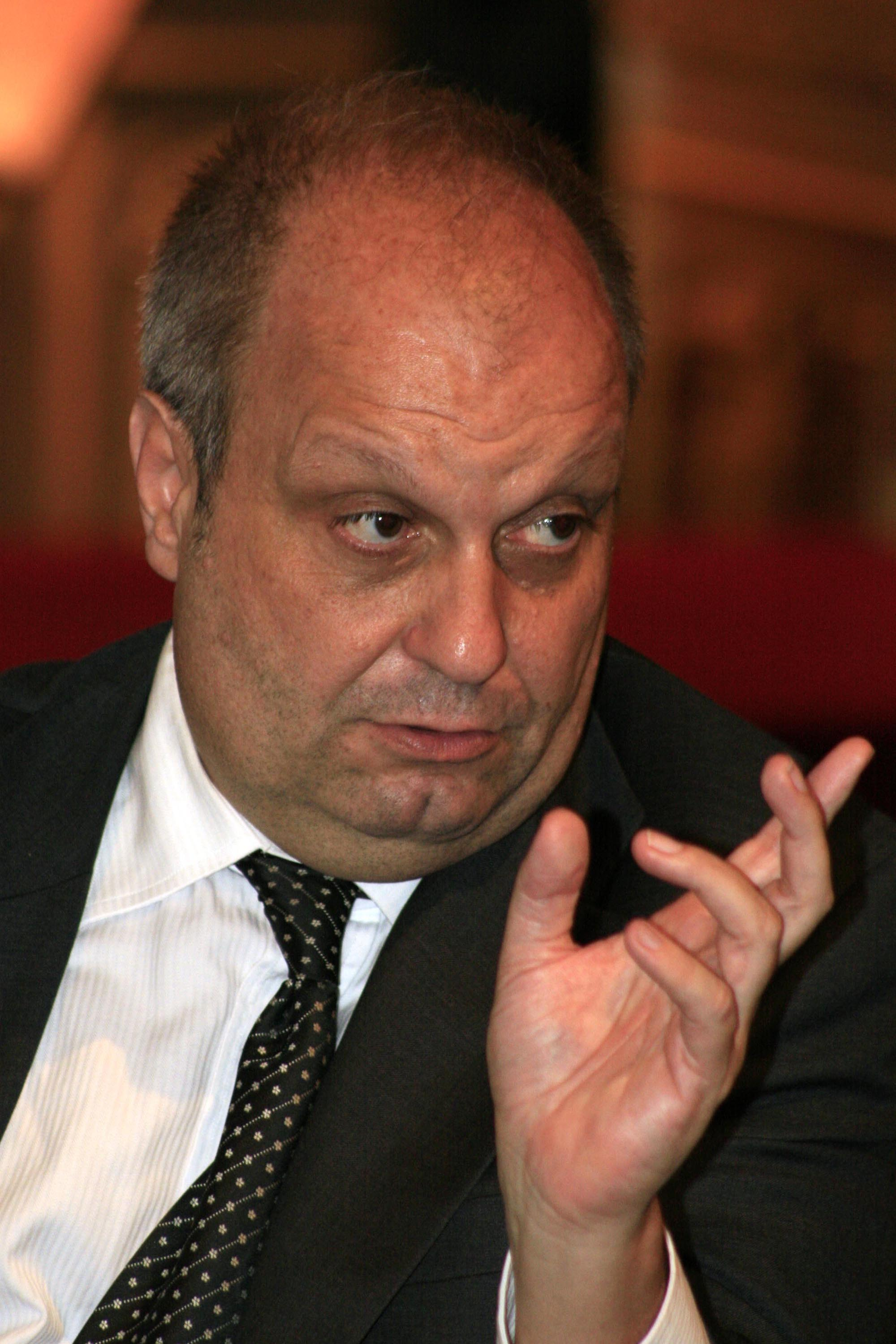
Portrait of Hernán Lombardi

Santiago Hernán Lombardi (born 4 May 1960) is an Argentine politician and civil engineer. From 2021 until 2024, he served as National Deputy representing Buenos Aires province. Previously, he served as Minister of Culture, Sports and Tourism during the presidency of Fernando de la Rúa in 2001. Also, he served as Director of the System of Public Media of Argentina between 2015 and 2019, designated by president Mauricio Macri. He is part of Radical Civic Union.

He was born in Buenos Aires into a family of Italian origins. With a degree in Engineering and postgraduate degrees in marketing management and economics, he worked as a tourism entrepreneur, managing various ventures, the most known is Torres de Manantiales in Mar del Plata, a hotel complex.
