= Hospital Argerich =

Coordinates: 34.6280°S 58.3656°W

Argerich Hospital
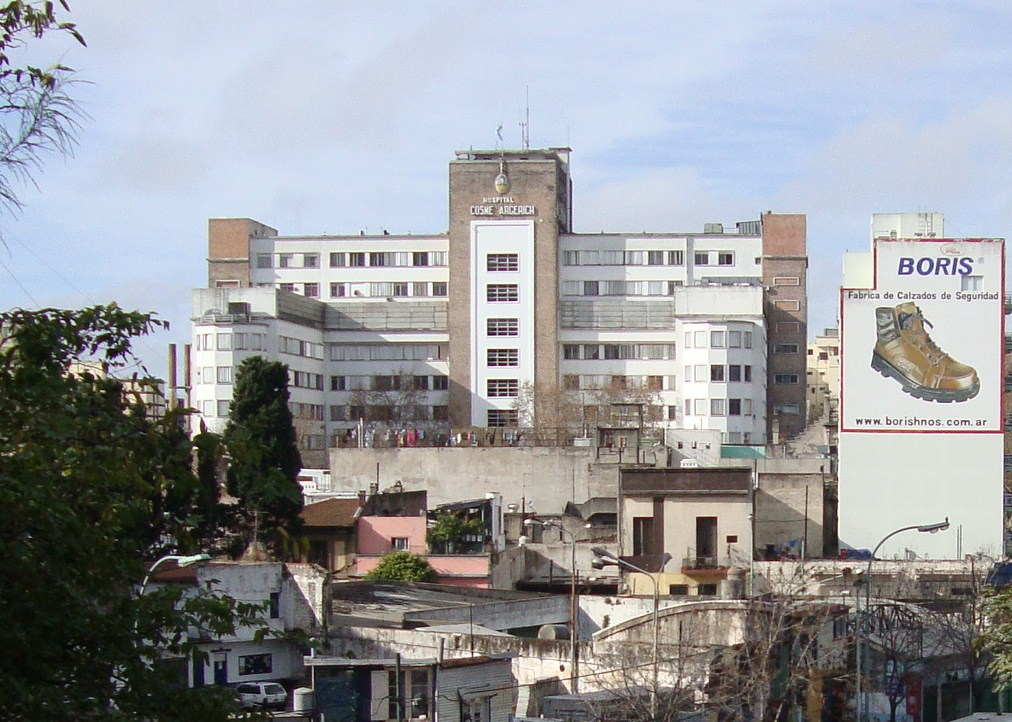

Geography
- Location: La Boca, Buenos Aires, Argentina

Organisation
- Type: Specialist

Services
- Speciality: Cardiology, General Surgery, Gynecology

History
- Opened: 1897

Links
- Website: www.buenosaires.gob.ar/hospitalargerich
- Lists: Hospitals in Argentina

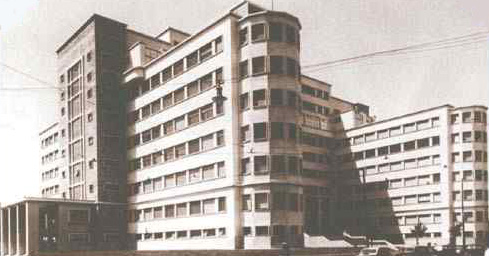
Argerich Hospital in 1945

Argerich Hospital is a metropolitan public hospital in Buenos Aires, Argentina. The hospital is located in the La Boca neighborhood.

== History ==
The oldest forerunner of the Argerich Hospital is the La Boca Sanitary Station, inaugurated in 1897 during the administration of Mayor Francisco Alcobendas. It was located on 555, 5 Brandsen Street and it was a simple aid room built by the neighbors, “La Asistencia”.

With the increase in demand and the rapid growth of the neighborhood, a new building was already necessary in 1900, and opened at Pinzón 546. On October 28, 1904. The name of Dr. Cosme Argerich was given to the hospital.

The current building of the hospital was built by the General Directorate of Architecture of the Ministry of Public Works, and transferred, before its opening, to the Municipality of the City of Buenos Aires, on November 8, 1945. The new Hospital Argerich was finally opened on 30 December 1945.

The hospital was built on land formerly owned by the Catalinas company, founded by Francisco Seeber in the late 19th century. This company was the owner of a dock and two large areas of port warehouses, which were named Catalinas Norte and Catalinas Sur. The company disappeared in the 1940s, selling both extensive properties. Catalinas Sur, in the La Boca neighborhood, was later transformed by the Municipality into a public housing neighborhood, and retained its old name, with which the housing complex is known today. In 1952 the area of cardiovascular surgery, the area of ileopancreatic surgery and hemodynamic diagnostics and treatments and infrastructure for 173 beds were added. In 1997, it was remodeled again by the City Government, according to the project of the architects Aftalión-Bischof-Egozcué-Vidal. In 2010, 34 deaths due to bacteria occurred in the hospital of the City Government. In 2020 the first death that occurred in Argentina and in the region due to coronavirus occurred at this hospital.
