= La Tablada =

City in Buenos Aires Province, Argentina

- City
- Location in Greater Buenos Aires
- Coordinates: 34°41′S 58°32′W
- Country: Argentina
- Province: Buenos Aires
- Partido: La Matanza
- Founded: 1909
- Elevation: 11 m (36 ft)

Population (2001 census [INDEC])
  - Total: 80,389
  - Density: 8,453/km^{2} (21,890/sq mi)
- CPA Base: B 1766
- Area code: +54 11

La Tablada is a city in Argentina. It is located in La Matanza Partido and is part of the Greater Buenos Aires metro area.

== Overview ==
La Tablada initially developed around the Buenos Aires Western Railway (Spanish: Ferrocarril Oeste de Buenos Aires) station inaugurated in 1900. The station, located on the 28 km (18 mi) marker along the Haedo—La Plata line, primarily served the wholesale market established nearby in 1901, and in 1909, the settlement's first homestead lots were sold.

Most of the settlement's 1,500 early homeowners worked in the wholesale market, which was closely tied to the Liniers cattle market just north of La Tablada, and numerous meat packing plants opened in the town during the 1910s and 1920s. Provincial electricity services and the town's first clinic were established in 1925.

The city grew moderately yet steadily in subsequent decades, and became home to the third-largest business and industrial community in La Matanza Partido. The important La Tablada Regiment was the site of an attack in January 1989 by members of the left-wing Movimiento Todos por la Patria. La Tablada was declared a city by the Provincial Legislature on November 11, 1993.

The city is home to the La Tablada Israelite Cemetery, the largest Jewish cemetery in Latin America.
