= Claudio Bonadio =

Argentine judge (1956–2020)

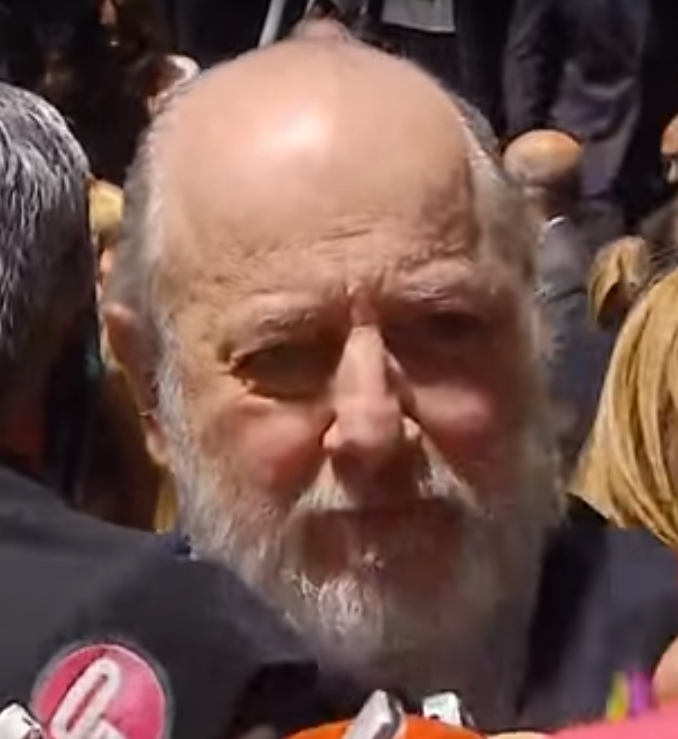
- Born: 1 February 1956; San Martín, Buenos Aires, Argentina
- Died: 4 February 2020 (aged 64); Buenos Aires, Argentina
- Education: University of Buenos Aires
- Occupations: Federal judge and lawyer

Claudio Bonadio (Spanish pronunciation: [ˈklawðjo βonaˈðio]; 1 February 1956 – 4 February 2020) was an Argentine judge, who was in charge of Federal Criminal and Correctional Court No. 11 since 1994. In that role he intervened in causes of strong impact, some of which involved important government officials and politicians since his appointment, among other causes of high impact on public opinion, including former Presidents of Argentina Fernando de la Rúa, Néstor Kirchner and Cristina Fernández de Kirchner.

== Career ==
He received a lawyer's degree from the University of Buenos Aires (UBA) in 1988.

Bonadio was an advisor to Carlos Corach (who was later Minister of the Interior of Carlos Menem) from September 1990 to September 1992. He was then his Undersecretary for Legal Affairs from September 1992 to June 1994, in the structure of the Legal Secretariat and Technique of the Presidency of the Argentine Nation.

In 1993, he was appointed federal judge in charge of the federal court of Morón, Buenos Aires, by President Carlos Menem, with the agreement of the Senate. At that time there was no Council of the Magistracy, and he was assigned to the National Criminal and Correctional Court when the president increased the number of federal courts.

== Judicial cases ==
=== PAMI Case ===
In February 1998, Víctor Alderete, then the controller of the PAMI, was prosecuted for corruption cases. Bonadio was denounced for his acting as a judge for giving protection to Alderete. On 5 June 2000, journalist Marcelo Bonelli published an article with information on the tax affidavit of Alderete. A year later, Bonadio prosecuted the journalist for violating the secrecy of the affidavit. Some time later the Chamber voided the resolution based on constitutional respect for the right to freedom of expression and press.

In 2004, the Oficina Anticorrupción Anti-Corruption Office denounced him, attributing to him "breach of duties, prevarication and influence peddling" for suspicious handling in a case to favor Alderete. The presentation explained that the magistrate failed to quote a senior official linked to Carlos Menem "in order to fulfill the word he would have given to former Interior Minister Carlos Corach, who at the request of the former president would have asked him to unlink him."

=== AMIA bombings ===
On 18 July 1994, a car bomb terrorist attack against the Argentine Israel Mutual Association (AMIA) took place in Buenos Aires, killing 85 people and injuring 300 others.

In 2005, Bonadio was removed from the case investigating the cover-up and false leads planted in the AMIA case for "lack of impartiality." The court considered that he should have excused himself from acting in a file in which his colleague and friend Juan José Galeano and his former boss Carlos Corach were suspected. It was also considered that he had a double role in the case, acting as a judge on the claims of cover-up that had been made on his own person. He was subsequently denounced in the Council of the Judiciary.

In 2010, in the context of the AMIA case, he was denounced by prosecutor Alberto Nisman, for threats and illegal espionage along with the macro official Fino Palacios and former minister Carlos Corach. Nisman also denounced Bonadio for the messages of intimidation he received against him, who also put his daughters Iara and Kala at risk, and for wanting to kill him to dislodge him from the AMIA case.

=== Hotesur case ===
The Hotesur case inquiries were about the alleged operation of members of the Kirchner family to rent the rooms of their hotels to businessmen to launder bribe money.

According to the Télam agency, Bonadio incurred irregularities when he ordered the Buenos Aires Metropolitan Police to search the Hotesur headquarters on 20 November 2014. This force has no jurisdiction in the territory in which it acted, as indicated by the Art. 8 Inc. b of Law 2894/08 by which it was created. As a result of this decision, the operating expenses were borne by the Government of the city of Buenos Aires by then head Mauricio Macri.

In 2015, he was removed from the Hotesur case because he “violated the right to defense in trial” of Romina Mercado and Lázaro Báez, and acted with “partiality” by not allowing the experts of the parties to review kidnapped documentation.

=== Alberto Nisman ===
In 2015, he was charged with the case of money laundering linked to prosecutor Alberto Nisman, where Sara Garfunkel, mother of Nisman, sister of the prosecutor, Judge Sandra Arroyo Salgado, computer technician Diego Lagomarsino and businessman Claudio Picón were investigated as suspected of having participated in the flight of dollars to a Merrill Lynch account in New York, in which there were movements of at least 650 thousand dollars.

=== Notebooks case ===
The case of the notebooks refers to the alleged bribe payments of government officials of Cristina Fernández de Kirchner documented by the former driver of a public official, Oscar Centeno. Since the beginning of 2018, he has been in charge of the case together with the prosecutor Stornelli. In the framework of this investigation, dozens of businessmen and former national and provincial officials and former officials were processed and imprisoned.
