= 18A =

2013 anti-government protest against Cristina Fernández de Kirchner

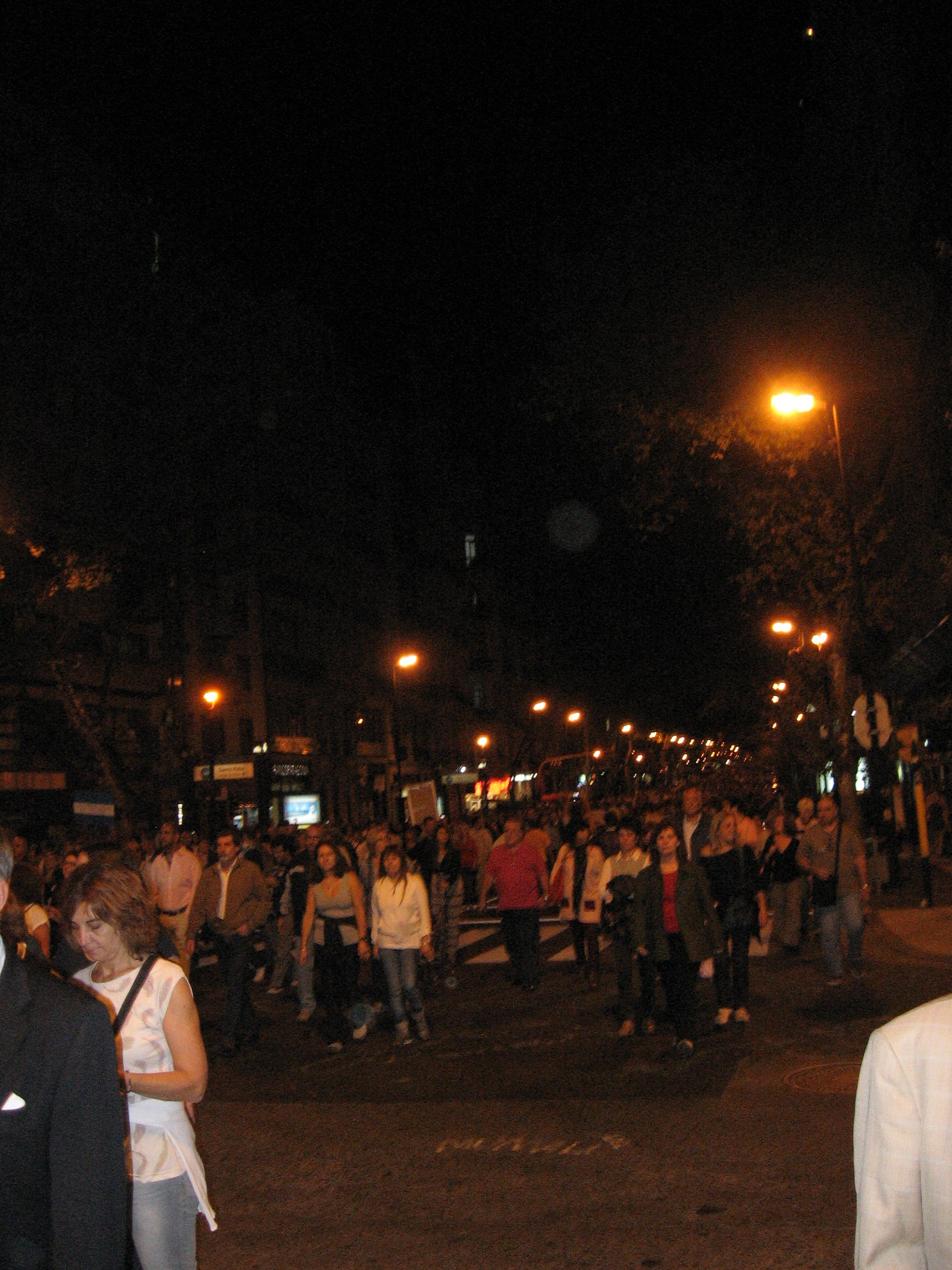
- Date: April 18, 2013
- Location: Argentina

The 18A was an Argentine cacerolazo that took place on April 18, 2013. Attended by nearly two million people, it was the largest demonstration at the time against the president Cristina Fernández de Kirchner.

== Antecedents ==
The 18A (a term that stands for the date "April 18") was initially called by groups in social networks as Facebook. Those groups had organized previous cacerolazos, the 8N and the 13S, and sought to repeat their success. The Argentine branch of the Anonymous group was among the organizers as well. Opposition parties in Argentina had not been formally involved in the previous demonstrations, which had no political leaning; in this case the organizers asked for political support from them.

The government proposed a number of bills to amend the judiciary. Three bills were controversial: the first proposes to limit the injunctions against the state, the second to include people selected in national elections at the body that appoints or accuses judges, and the third to create a new court that would limit the number of cases treated by the Supreme Court. The opposition considered that those bills attempt to control the judiciary. As the bills were going to be discussed on April 18, the Radical Civic Union, the Republican Proposal and the internal factions of Peronism that oppose Kirchner formally supported the demonstration. Still, the government announced that they would not decline the bills, even if the demonstration was massive.

== The demonstration ==
Many groups met at 19:00 at several points of Buenos Aires, marching to the Obelisk and Plaza de Mayo at 20:00. The demonstration included no speeches or orators, and the political parties that joined it did not use political flags or banners. The people marched then to the Argentine National Congress, which was still discussing the bill. A group of people managed to trespass the crowd control barriers and get to the entry of the Congress, by the time the bill was being approved.

The demonstration took place at other cities of Argentina as well. The people in Córdoba filled all the space at the intersection of the avenues Vélez Sarsfield and Hipólito Irigoyen. There were demonstrations at many other cities of the Córdoba Province, such as Villa Carlos Paz, Río Cuarto, Villa María, Villa Dolores and Alta Gracia; governor José Manuel de la Sota gave his support. The demonstration in Rosario met at the National Flag Memorial, which was attended by Miguel del Sel of the PRO party. La Plata, which was highly damaged by the 2013 Argentina floods, had a demonstration at Plaza Moreno, with people opposing the mayor Pablo Bruera and the perceived corruption in the national government. There were demonstrations at Mar del Plata, Salta, Bariloche, San Juan, Santiago del Estero, Bahía Blanca and Misones, among other cities. There were small protests at the Argentine embassies in 15 foreign cities, such as Sydney, Tokio, Washington, Barcelona, Madrid, Rome, Milan, Santiago de Chile and Rio de Janeiro.

President Cristina Kirchner ignored the protest, and wrote several messages in Twitter during it, none of them related to the demonstration. She was not at the country at the moment, as she was visiting Venezuela for the inauguration of president Nicolás Maduro. Still, there was a demonstration outside the Quinta de Olivos, the official presidential residence.
