= Movimiento Todos por la Patria =

Post-Dirty War Argentine guerrilla group

- Leader: Enrique Gorriarán Merlo
- Dates active: 1986 – 24 January 1989
- Split from: People's Revolutionary Army (Argentina)
- Country: Argentina
- Active regions: Cordoba, Buenos Aires
- Ideology: Anti-imperialism; Anti-globalization; Left-wing nationalism
- Political position: Far-left
- Status: Disbanded
- Size: 46 militants

The Movimiento Todos por la Patria (MTP) was an Argentine leftist guerrilla movement active from 1986 to 1989, whose leader was Enrique Gorriarán Merlo. He was responsible for carrying out the 1989 attack on La Tablada Army Regiment.

== Background ==
By the time the group was founded, Merlo had been active in radical activities for years; he fought with the People's Revolutionary Army (ERP) in the 1970s. This organization was responsible for kidnappings, bombings and assaults on Argentine army barracks in the 1970s; later went on to collaborate with the Sandinistas to assassinate former Nicaraguan dictator Anastasio Somoza Debayle on September 17, 1980, who was living in exile in Paraguay. The MTP was created in 1985 and ceased activities four years later.

== La Tablada Attack ==
At the time of the attack, far-right rogue army elements known as "carapintadas" or “painted faces” (a reference to their use of facial camouflage), had launched far-right uprisings against the Alfonsín administration, in response to the Trial of the Juntas. The MTP, claiming to be preventing a coup by the said elements, launched an attack on the Third Mechanized Infantry Regiment barracks in La Tablada (Regimiento de Infantería Mecanizada Nº 3, RIM3). They broke into the barracks by ramming a stolen truck into the main gate. Another conscript, Private Víctor Eduardo Scarafiocco, claimed that he and others were used as human shields by the guerrillas and that Private Héctor Cardozo was killed as a result.

In response, the Argentine Army and Buenos Aires Provincial Police launched a counterattack, and the ensuing fight left 39 dead and approximately 60 injured. President Alfonsín condemned the attack on the barracks and later visited the site, accompanied by commandos. The actions of the government forces were not without controversy: white phosphorus was used, contrary to international law, and it was reported that the security forces executed some captured guerrillas.

== Aftermath ==
After six years in exile, Merlo was arrested by the Argentine government in Mexico in 1995 and sentenced to life in prison. Pardoned in May 2003 by Eduardo Duhalde, then-president, he quietly returned to civilian life, and died in 2006 of cardiac arrest.

Merlo said after the pardon that he was never a terrorist. On 13 February 2011 Joaquín Ramos, an ex guerrilla, wrote a letter where he described how idealized the revolutionary struggle was and how improvised the assault was, in addition to his experience in the trials after the battle.

== See also ==
- Dirty War
- Human rights in Argentina
- Enrique Gorriarán Merlo
- Montoneros
- Carapintadas
