= 18F (demonstration) =

2015 anti-government protest against Cristina Fernández de Kirchner

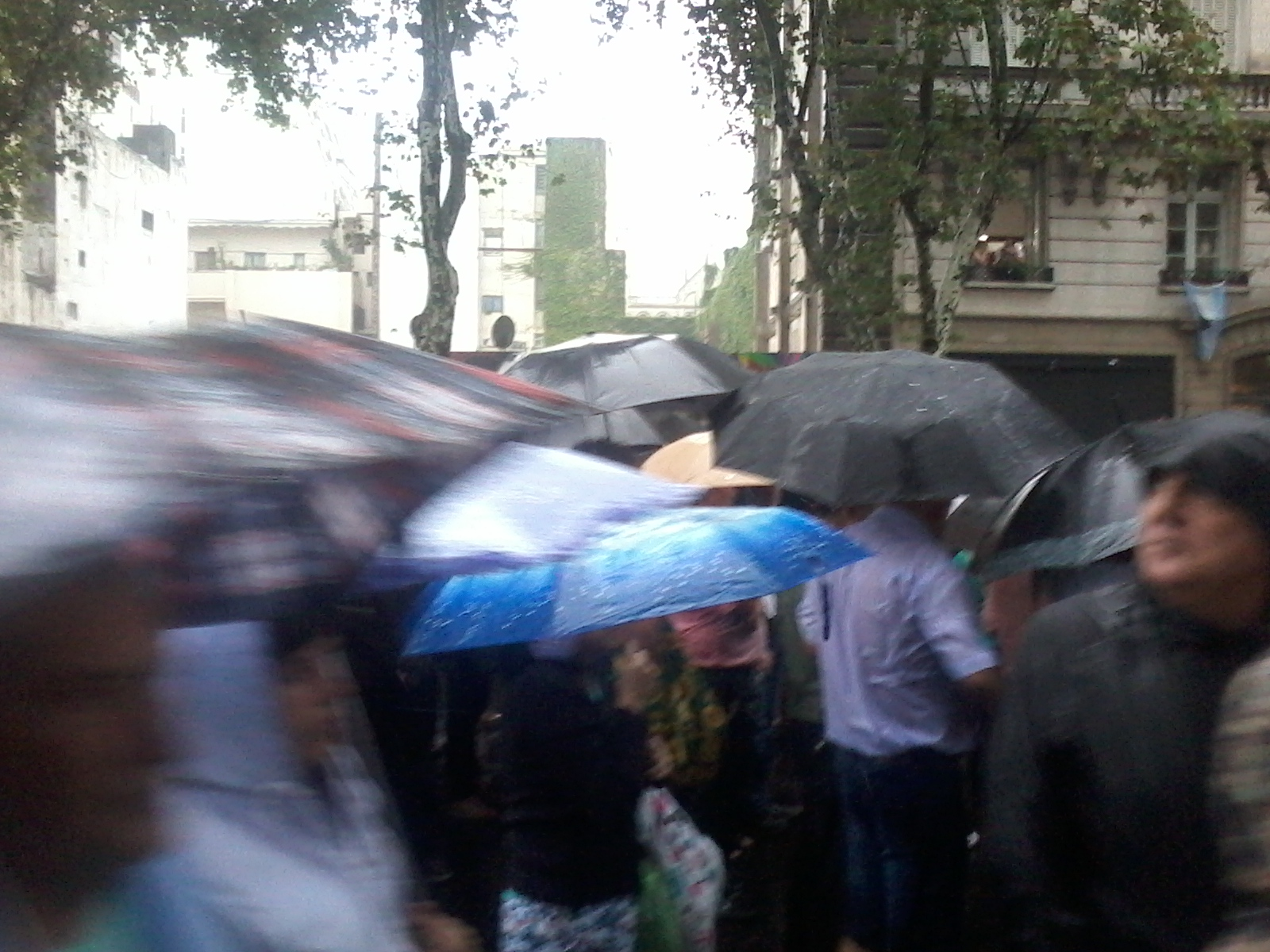
- People with umbrellas during a demonstration in support of Alberto Nisman
- Date: February 18, 2015
- Location: Argentina

The 18F was a demonstration that took place in Argentina on February 18, 2015, one month after the death of prosecutor Alberto Nisman. Nisman was investigating the 1994 AMIA bombing, a terrorist attack, and accused the president Cristina Fernández de Kirchner of covering up Iranian suspects. He was found dead at his home the day before he could address the Congress, and his death was still an unsolved case at the time of the demonstration. It was attended in Buenos Aires by 400,000 people, during a torrential storm.

== Context ==
Alberto Nisman was a prosecutor working on the AMIA bombing case. It was a terrorist attack against a Jewish community center that took place in 1994, and which is still unsolved. Nisman prepared a criminal complaint against president Cristina Fernández de Kirchner, accusing her of covering up the involvement of Iranian suspects. He was found dead at his house on January 18, one day before he would report his progress to the Congress. As of February 18, the date of the demonstration, the investigation of his death had not settled if it was a suicide or a murder.

The demonstration was organized by a group of prosecutors, and attended by Nisman's relatives, including his former wife, judge Sandra Arroyo Salgado.

== The event ==
The protest in Buenos Aires took place under a torrential storm. It was attended by thousands of people anyway, and the street was filled with umbrellas and Argentine flags. It started at 19:00 at the Congressional Plaza, continued through Avenida de Mayo with a stop at Nisman's working place, and ended at Plaza de Mayo. It was organized as a silent demonstration, only as an homage to Alberto Nisman, and devoid of political flags or banners. The rule was followed, with occasional exceptions for waves of spontaneous clapping or people singing the Argentine national anthem. The city police estimated that the demonstration was attended by 400,000 people.

There were similar demonstrations at other populated places of Argentina, such as Mar del Plata, Córdoba and Rosario.

== Reactions ==
President Kirchner led the opening of the Atucha II Nuclear Power Plant on the same day, with a speech delivered though the emergency population warning. Contrary to expectations, she did not mention the demonstration at all. She stayed at her private home in El Calafate during the demonstration.

Cabinet chief Jorge Capitanich considered that the demonstration was a coup d'état attempt by the judiciary. He said that the government respected popular demonstrations, and then said that the people who called it were both supporters of baby theft during the National Reorganization Process and lawyers of drug dealers.
