= 2015 opening of regular sessions of the National Congress of Argentina =

Speech by the President of Argentina

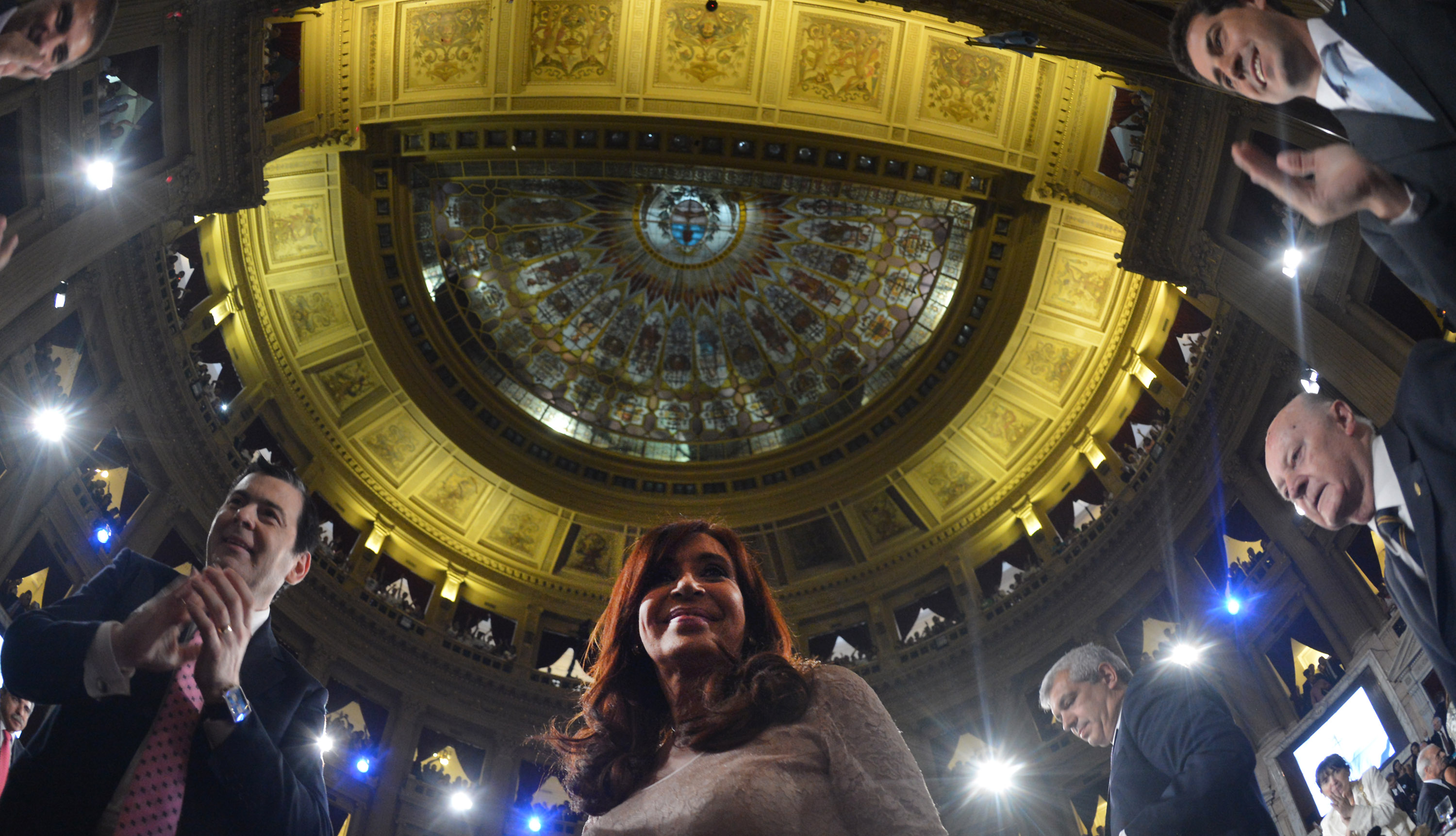
- Date: March 1, 2015
- Venue: National Congress of Argentina
- Location: Buenos Aires
- Type: Opening of regular sessions of the National Congress of Argentina
- Participants: Cristina Fernández de Kirchner

The 2015 opening of regular sessions of the National Congress of Argentina took place on March 1, 2015. It was a speech delivered by president Cristina Fernández de Kirchner at the National Congress of Argentina.

== Contents and delivery ==
=== AMIA case ===
The death of Alberto Nisman, the prosecutor investigating the 1994 AMIA bombing, took place two months before and sparked great political controversy. He had denounced Kirchner for attempting to conceal the role of Iran in it, with the Memorandum of understanding between Argentina and Iran, and judge Daniel Rafecas rejected the case some days earlier. Kirchner accused Nisman of holding contradictory standards and suggested that Nisman changed his mind for some unknown reason during his vacations, shortly before his death. She pointed that she attended all commemorations of the attack at the Asociación Mutual Israelita Argentina, pointing that it took place during an earlier government, and accused Israel of not holding a similar interest over the 1992 attack on Israeli embassy in Buenos Aires.

=== Economy ===
Kirchner accused the Vulture funds of trying to disrupt the economy of Argentina, and claimed that she had solved the problem of external debt for Argentina. She also announced that she would send a bill to the congress to nationalize the railway services. She justified the commercial deals with China, and announced bills that would seek to increase the industrial development. She also praised that overall wages had increased over 200% since 2003, when her husband Néstor Kirchner took office. As several economists criticised the state of the economy, she argued that the problems had not turned into a great crisis, and pointed that the summer season was a huge success.

== Responses ==
Cristina Kirchner mentioned during her speech that the journalist Joseph Cotterill, from the Financial Times, had pointed out that the price of Argentine bonds was on the rise. Cotterill became aware of it within the day, and replied in Twitter: "Thanks for the mention in your speech, @CFKArgentina. But I fear that the bond's price is going up the less time you have left in office".

The state of Israel issued a diplomatic answer to the speech. It pointed out that, although the territory of the Israeli embassy belongs to Israel, the responsibility for the security of the diplomats belongs to the host country.

The speech was criticised by many leaders of the opposition. Senator Ernesto Sanz criticized that it did not mention the high inflation, crime rates and illicit drug trade. He also considered that it was unfair to raise criticism against Nisman, as he was dead. Senator Gerardo Morales criticized the conflictive tone of the speech and the criticisms to the judiciary. Sergio Massa criticized the length of the speech, over 3 hours, and considered that it was out of touch with the people's concerns.
