= Argentina–Iran relations =

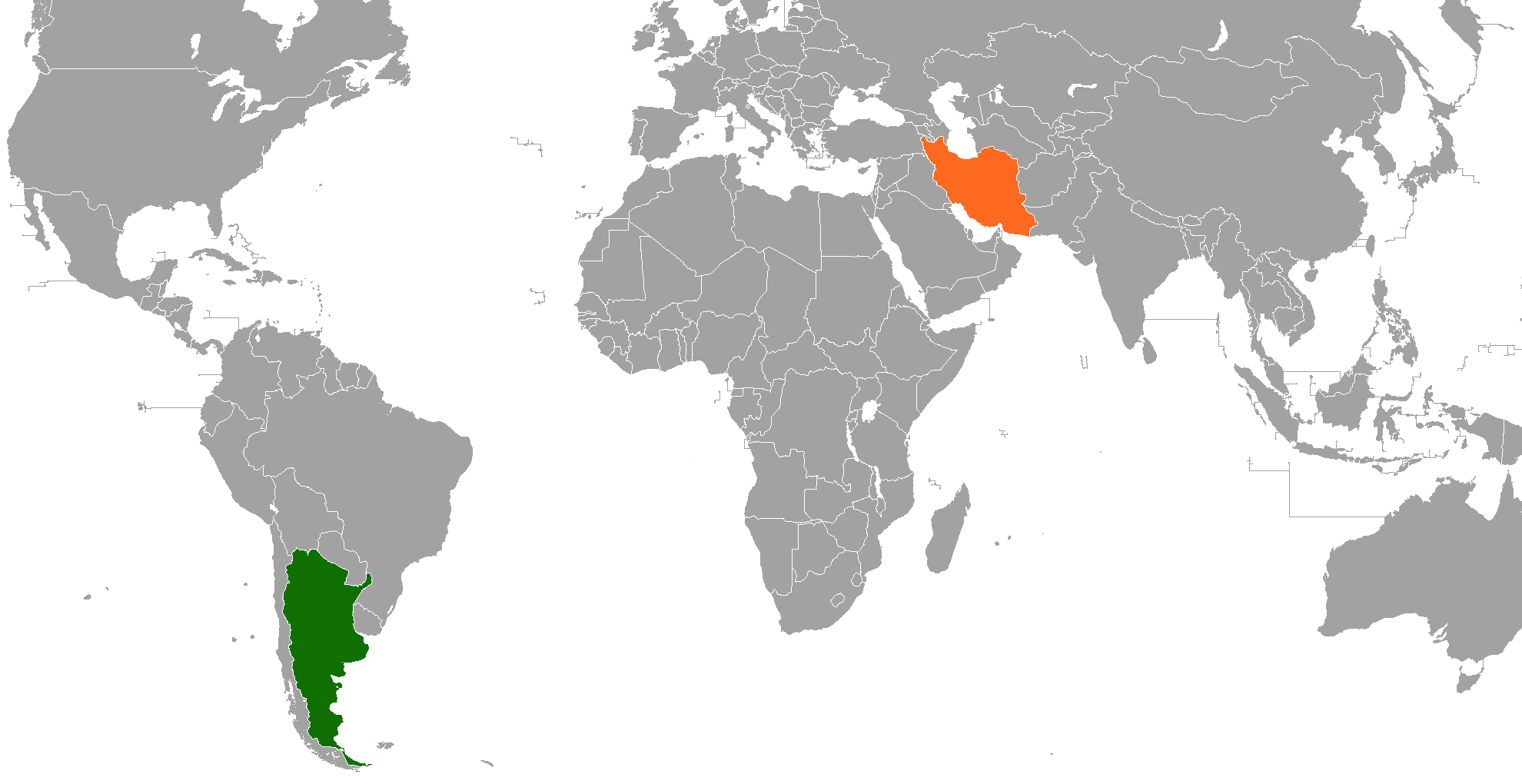

- Argentina: Iran

Argentina and Iran maintain diplomatic relations. Initially, relations between both nations were cordial; however, relations strained after the bombings of the Israeli embassy in Buenos Aires in 1992 and against the Asociación Mutual Israelita Argentina (AMIA) in 1994, also in Buenos Aires. Since then, the Argentine government has accused Iran and its proxies for attacks on its territory.

Both nations are members of the Group of 15, Group of 24, Group of 77 and the United Nations.

== History ==
=== Early relations ===
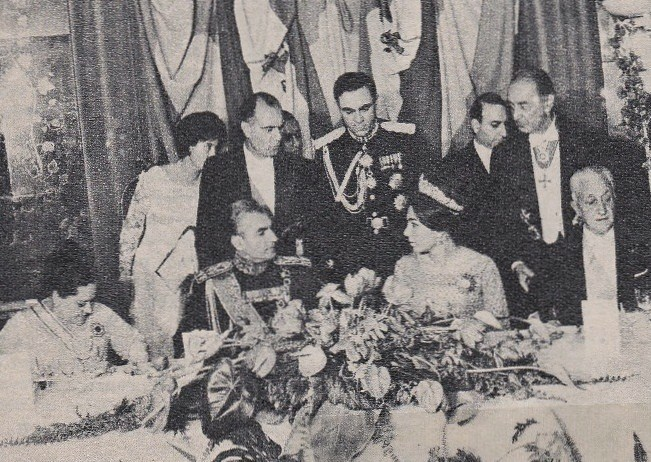
The Shah Mohammad Reza Pahlavi on an official visit to Argentina, along with Argentine President Arturo Umberto Illia; May 1965.

In 1902, Argentina and Iran (at the time known as Persia) established diplomatic relations. In 1935 Iran opened a resident embassy in Buenos Aires, its first diplomatic mission in Latin America. In 1948, Argentina opened an embassy in Tehran.

In May 1965, Shah Mohammad Reza Pahlavi paid an official visit to Argentina and met with Argentine President Arturo Umberto Illia. While in Argentina, the Shah was awarded the Order of the Liberator General San Martín, Argentina's highest decoration.

In the 1970s, due to the internal political instability in Argentina; the relationship between the two nations cooled down until shortly after the coup in March 1976. In July 1977, an Argentine delegation made up of four people arrived in Tehran. For two days they met with their Iranian counterparts and discussed different possibilities of cooperation, and created a list of possible agreements of which would be signed at a later date.

In 1979, Iran experienced a Revolution which saw the Shah removed from power and sent into exile. The triumph of the Islamic Revolution in Iran in 1979 did not represent, in principle, any damage in bilateral relations between the two nations. In 1990, Argentina signed a Nuclear Energy Agreement with Iran.

=== Israeli embassy and AMIA bombings ===
In March 1992, the Israeli embassy in Buenos Aires was bombed, killing 29 people and wounding 242. The bombing was claimed by the Islamic Jihad Organization which has been linked to Iran and possibly Hezbollah.

In July 1994, the Asociación Mutual Israelita Argentina (AMIA) was bombed, killing 85 people and injuring hundreds. Shortly after the attack, Ansar Allah, a Palestinian Jihadist organization widely held as a front for Hezbollah, reportedly claimed responsibility for the attack. Argentina is home to a Jewish community of over 180,000, the largest in Latin America and sixth in the world outside Israel.

In September 2004, Special Prosecutor Alberto Nisman was appointed to lead the AMIA bombing investigation. The probe into the 1994 terrorist attack against the Asociación Mutual Israelita Argentina (AMIA) had been marked by judicial misconduct and had reached an impasse. In October 2006, Nisman formally accused the Government of Iran of directing the AMIA bombing, and the Hezbollah militia of carrying it out.

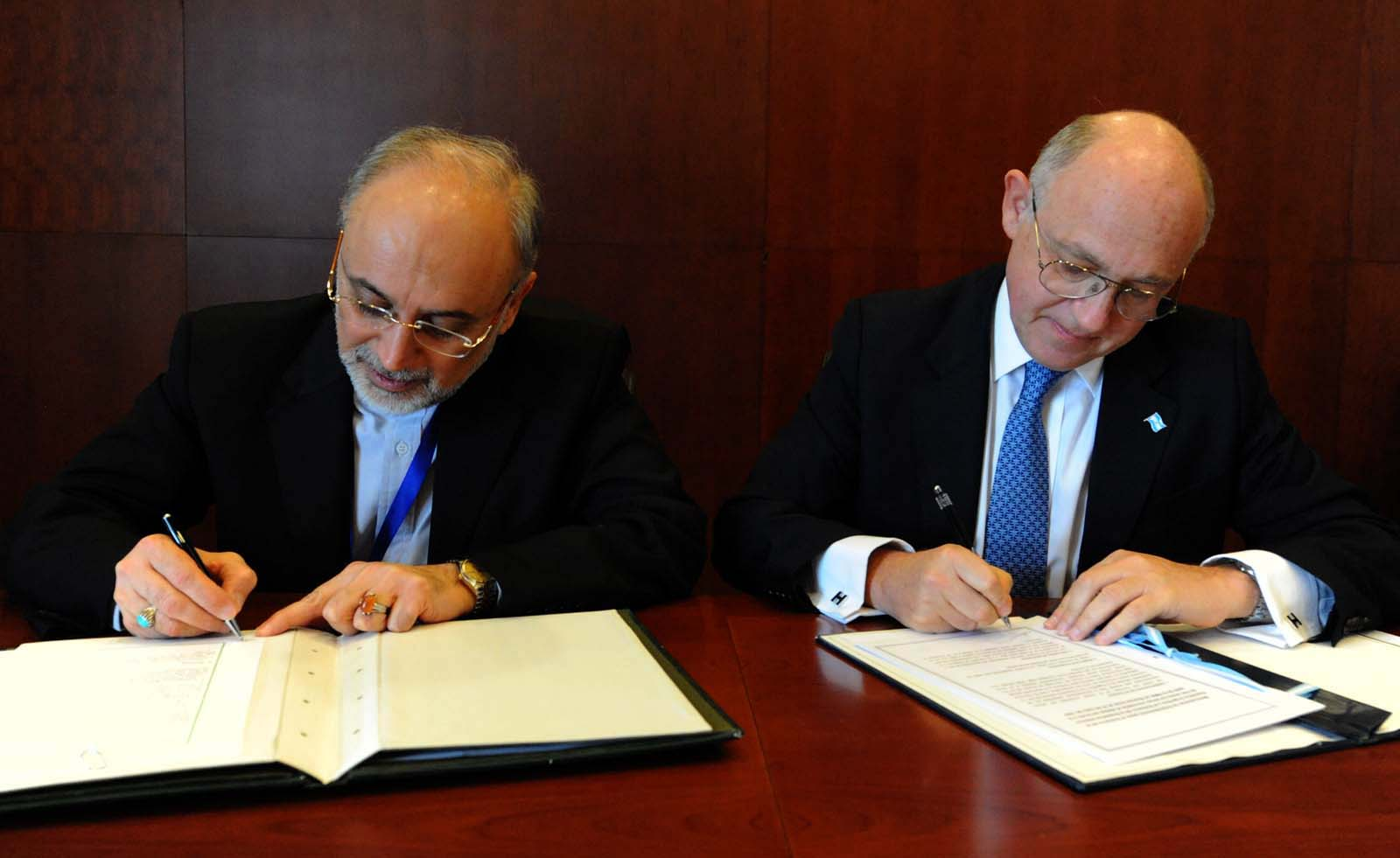
Signing of the Memorandum of understanding between Argentina and Iran; January 2013.

On 27 January 2013, the Government of Argentina announced it had signed a memorandum of understanding with Iran to establish a "truth commission" to investigate the AMIA bombing. According to President Cristina Fernández de Kirchner, the commission was established to "analyze all the documentation presented to date by the judicial authorities of Argentina and Iran…and to give its vision and issue a report with recommendations about how the case should proceed within the legal and regulatory framework of both parties." The agreement was signed by Argentine Foreign Minister Héctor Timerman and Iranian Foreign Minister Ali Akbar Salehi in Addis Ababa, Ethiopia.

On 18 January 2015, Alberto Nisman, the special prosecutor investigating the attacks, was due to appear in front of the Argentine Congress and present his evidence that Iran was behind the bombings and that the Argentine government had covered it up, however, just hours before his scheduled testimony, Nisman was found dead in his apartment. His death was immediately ruled a suicide, amidst great controversy whether he killed himself or he was killed.

Transcripts of intercepted phone conversations between Argentine and Iranian government officials were made public on 21 January 2015, as part of a 289-page report written by Nisman. The transcripts indicated that Argentina shipped food and offered weapons to Iran in exchange for oil and a promise to shield Iranian officials from charges; however, the deal fell through because Argentina could not convince Interpol to rescind arrest warrants against Iranian officials suspected of being involved in the attack.

The memorandum agreement between the two nations was voided in December 2015, shortly after the inauguration of Argentine President Mauricio Macri. In 2017, former Foreign Minister Héctor Timerman was arrested under charges of covering up Iranian involvement in the 1994 AMIA bombing. He died of cancer while he was under arrest in December 2018.

=== Present-day relations ===
In 2018, Argentina and Iran celebrated 80 years of diplomatic relations. In July 2018, Argentina designated Iranian-backed Hezbollah a terrorist organization and ordered the freezing of the group's assets in the country. Hezbollah has been accused of operating among the jungle of the Triple Frontier between Argentina, Brazil and Paraguay; to funnel large sums of money to militia leaders in the Middle East and finances training camps, propaganda operations and bomb attacks in South America.

In 2020, there were approximately 2,000 Iranians living in Argentina.

In August 2021, Argentina vehemently opposed the decision by the Iranian Government to appoint Ahmad Vahidi as Minister of the Interior. Vahidi is accused by Argentina as one of the perpetrators of the attack on the AMIA in 1994.

On June 12, 2022, an Iranian-linked Venezuelan Boeing 747 cargo plane was grounded in Argentina, where Argentine officials retained five passports, according to a local federal judge and Iranian official media.

On 17 January 2026, a decree designating the Islamic Revolutionary Guard Corps Quds Force and 13 affiliated individuals as terrorists was signed by Argentinian president Javier Milei. In the decree it was written that "The Quds Force is a division of Iran’s Islamic Revolutionary Guard Corps, specialising in training for carrying out terrorist attacks in other countries." The decree included a clarification of its implications: "This decision means that members of the Quds Force and their allies are now subject to financial sanctions and operational restrictions aimed at limiting their capacity to act, as well as protecting Argentina’s financial system from being used to economically support their activities." The decree also singled out Ahmad Vahidi, commander of the Quds Force at the time of the AMIA bombing, as a subject of an INTERPOL red notice; Vahidi was deputy commander-in-chief of the IRGC at the time of the decree. In response, Tehran’s city council approved a motion to rename Argentina Square.

On 2 April 2026, during the 2026 Iran war, Argentina ordered the Iranian charge d’affaires Mohsen Tehrani to leave the country within 48 hours. Tehrani complied with the order and left on 4 April.

== High-level visits ==
High-level visits from Argentina to Iran

- Foreign Undersecretary Alfredo Karim Yoma (1990)

High-level visits from Iran to Argentina

- Shah Mohammad Reza Pahlavi (1965)
- Special envoy Mir Hossein Moussavi (1990)

== Bilateral agreements ==
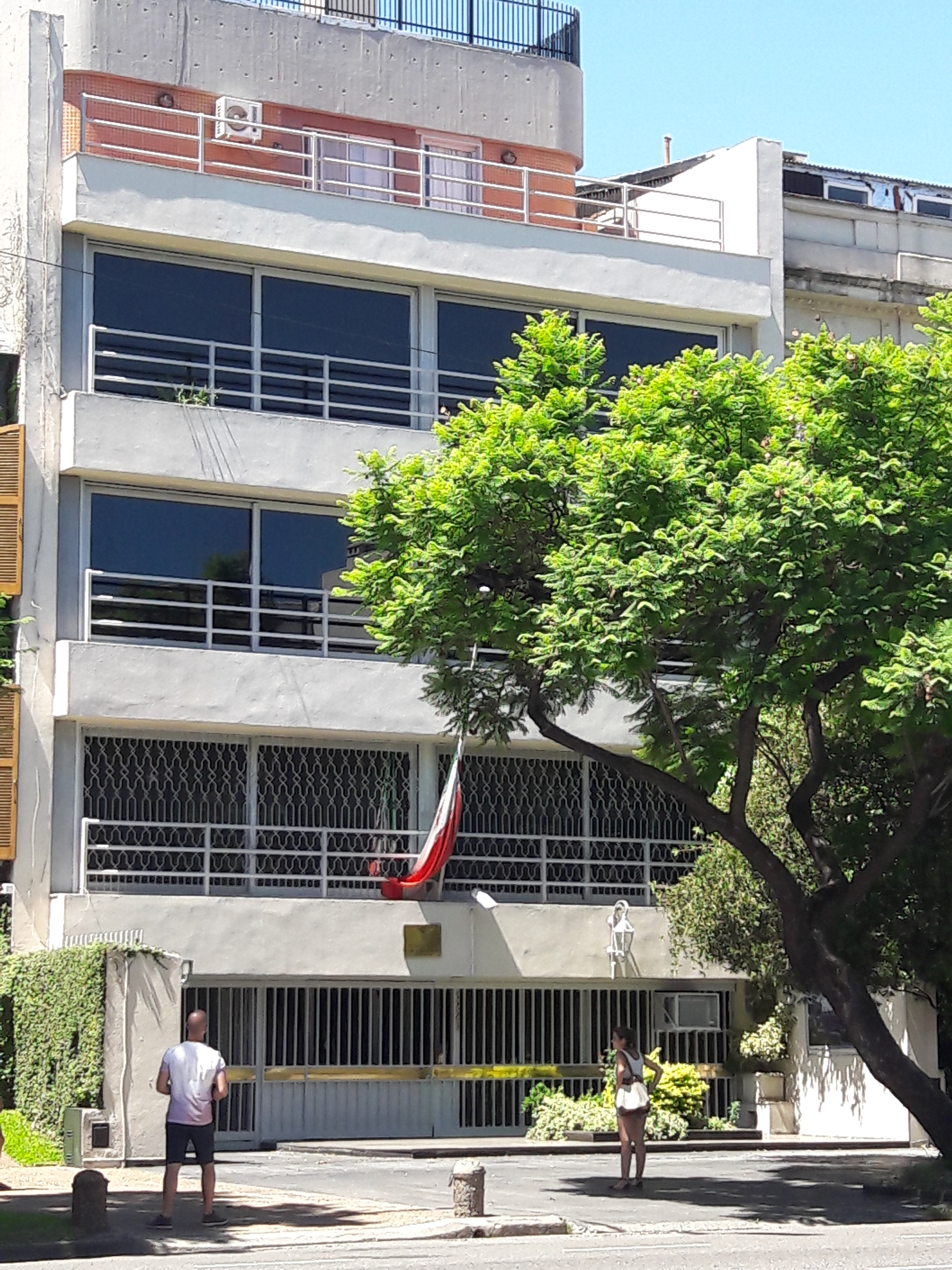
Embassy of Iran in Buenos Aires

Both nations have signed a few bilateral agreements, such as a Trade Agreement (1990), Memorandum of Understanding for the Development of Relationships (1990), Agreement of Cooperation for the Peaceful Use of Nuclear Energy (1990), and a Memorandum of Understanding to establish a Truth Commission in regards to the AMIA bombing.

== Resident diplomatic missions ==
- Argentina has an embassy in Tehran.
- Iran has an embassy in Buenos Aires.

== See also ==
- Argentina in the 2026 Iran war
- Foreign relations of Argentina
- Foreign relations of Iran
- Asociación Mutual Israelita Argentina
- AMIA bombing
- 1992 Buenos Aires Israeli embassy bombing
- Iranian diaspora
- Memorandum of understanding between Argentina and Iran
