= Asghari (surname) =

Asghari is a surname. Notable people with the surname include:

- Ahmad Reza Asghari, Iranian diplomat
- Elham Asghari (born 1981), Iranian female swimmer
- Hadi Asghari (born 1981), Iranian football striker
- Javad Asghari Moghaddam (born 1979), Iranian futsal player
- Reza Asghari (born 1964), Iranian-German economist and politician
- Sam Asghari (born 1994), Iranian-American model
- Samira Asghari (born 1994), Afghan member of the International Olympic Committee
- Vahid Asghari (born 1986), Iranian journalist and free speech activist
