= Argentina in the 2026 Iran war =

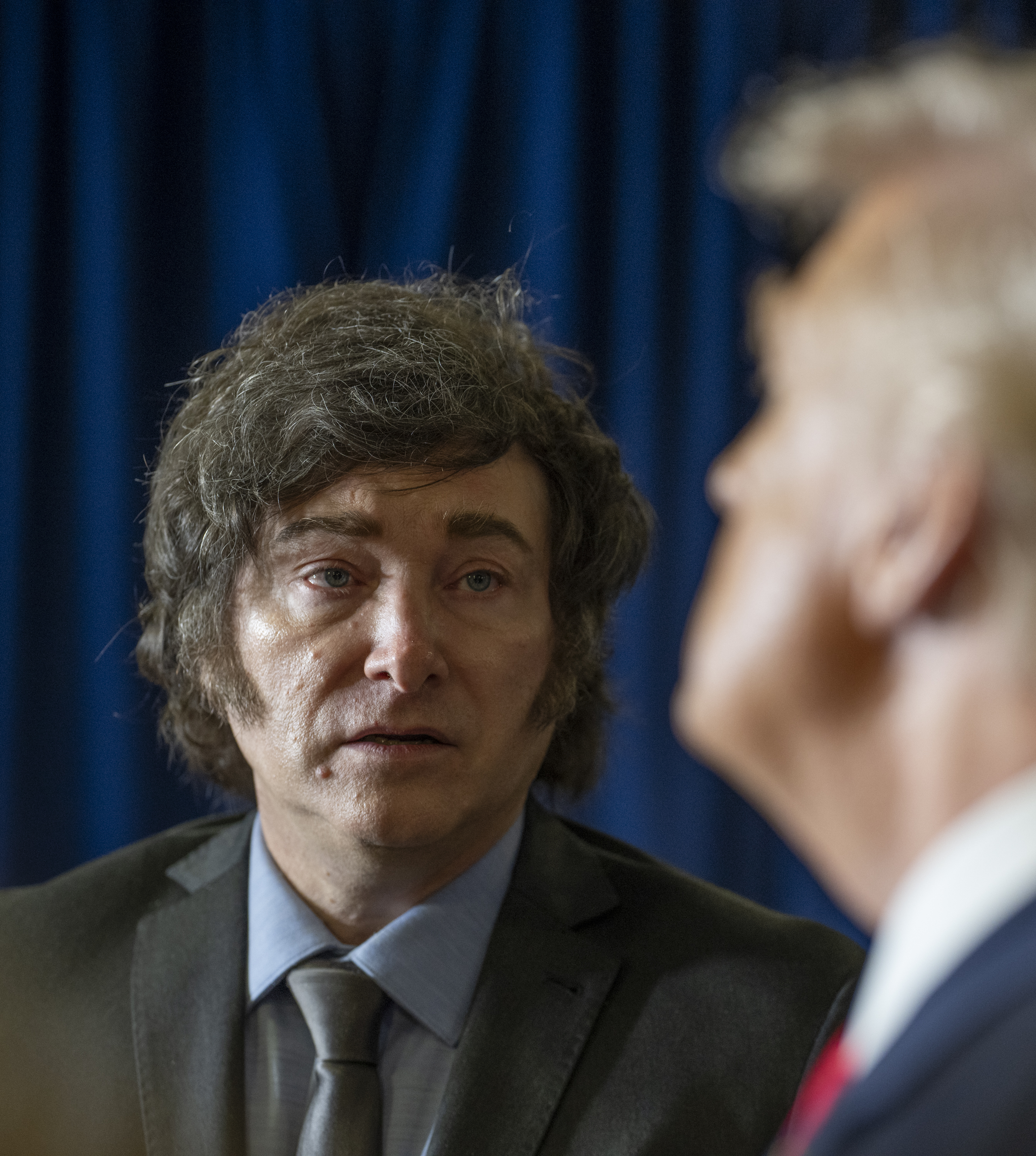
Argentine president Javier Milei talking with his US counterpart Donald Trump.

Argentina has adopted a policy of endorsement and support for the United States and Israel in response to the 2026 Iran war as part of President Javier Milei's international policy.

Under the Milei administration, Argentina became a vocal supporter of the United States and Israeli military actions against the Islamic Republic of Iran. Argentina and Iran have maintained tense relations since the AMIA bombing in 1994, which Argentina blames on Iran.

== Background ==
After the AMIA bombing in July 1994, the government of Argentina has blamed Iranian elements for the attack, alleging that Iran acted via Hezbollah proxies in Buenos Aires. Another suicide bombing two years earlier at the Israeli embassy in Buenos Aires, which has also been suspected as an act supported by Iran, had already strained relations between both countries.

The governments of Néstor Kirchner and his wife Cristina Fernández de Kirchner showed an improvement in the relations between Argentina and Iran, with Fernández de Kirchner signing a memorandum of understanding to pursue justice in joint cooperation with Iran and opposing, at least initially, Interpol red notices against Iranian officials. Fernández de Kirchner condemned President Mahmoud Ahmadinejad over his statements denying the Holocaust and boycotted his speeches at the UN. As Vice President of Alberto Fernández, she denounced the designation of some of the accused over AMIA to high military positions, including the case of Ahmad Vahidi and Mohsen Rezai.

In 2015, after the inauguration of Mauricio Macri, relations worsened again, with Macri revoking the memorandum with Iran and declaring Hezbollah a terrorist organization in July 2019, banning all Hezbollah's activities in the country and freezing its assets. Macri also blamed Iran for the death of prosecutor Alberto Nisman. This tension was partially relieved in the administration of President Alberto Fernández, a Kirchner ally. Fernández took a policy of inaction and insisted on pursuing justice independent of the Iranian position.

After the victory of Javier Milei in 2023, his government took an aggressive stance on Iran, aligning with Israel and supporting Israeli actions against Iran, including the April and October Israeli strikes on Iran as part of a retaliation for two attacks by Iran against Israel those same months. Milei continued to show support for Israel during the Gaza war and celebrated Israeli actions like the killing of Yahya Sinwar and the assassination of Hassan Nasrallah.

In April 2024, the Federal Criminal Cassation Court of Argentina blamed Iran for the attacks against the Israeli embassy in Buenos Aires and AMIA.

== Diplomatic position ==
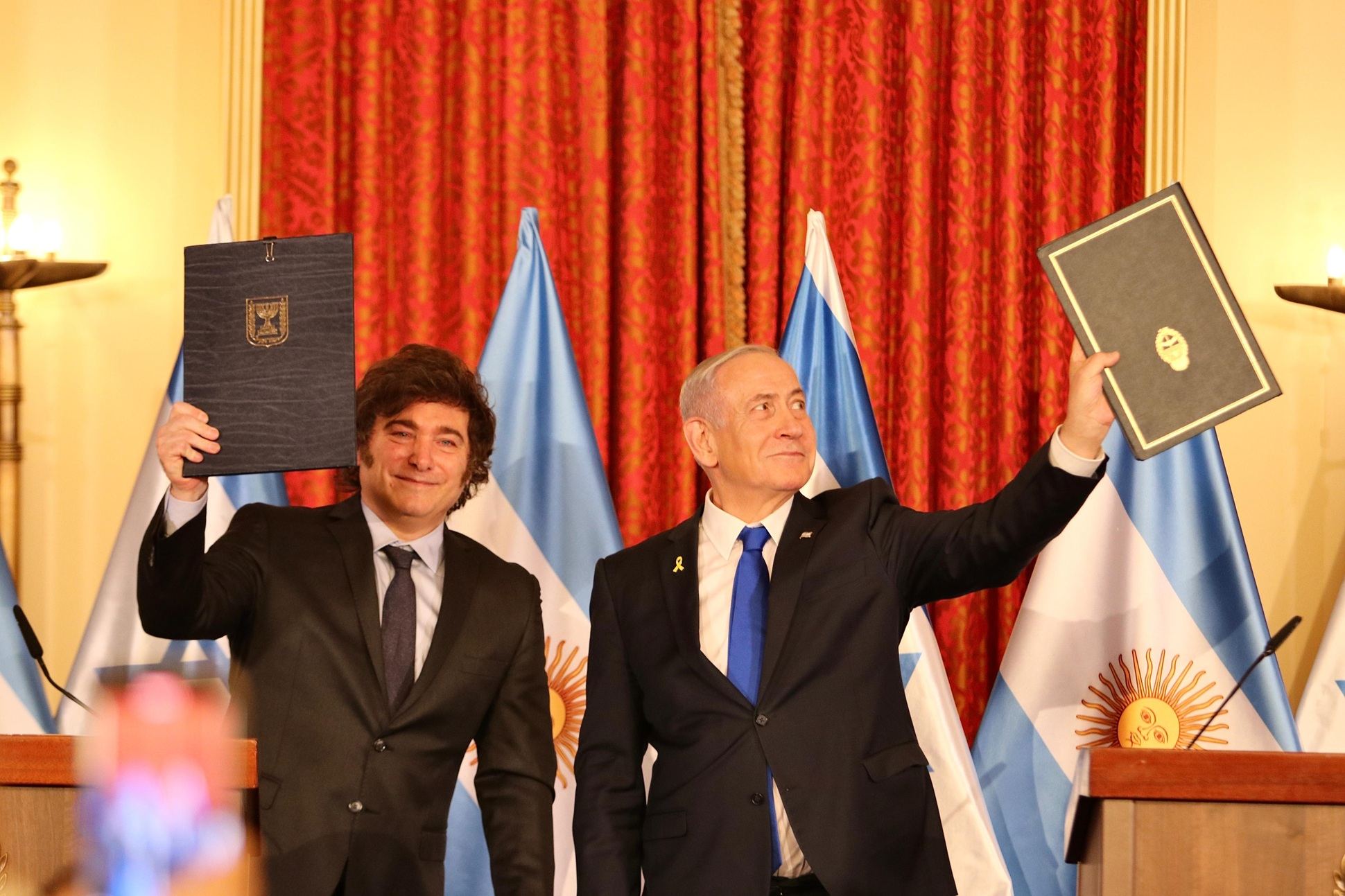
Milei with Israel prime minister, Benjamin Netanyahu.

Argentina supported the initial actions by the United States and Israel against Iran on 28 February 2026, with Foreign Minister Pablo Quirno saying that the aim of the strikes was to secure the region and bring lasting stability to the world. President Milei celebrated the assassination of Ali Khamenei, harshly criticizing him. Milei blamed Khamenei for the Iranian sponsor of terrorism, especially for the case of AMIA.

On 9 March 2026, during a visit to Yeshiva University in New York City, Milei said that he was proud to be the "most Zionist president in the world," adding that "we are going to win this war."

On 19 March 2026, Argentina said that it would grant military support to the United States in the Persian Gulf if the American government made the request, with a spokesman for Casa Rosada adding that "whatever aid they consider will be granted." During an interview with journalist Eduardo Feinmann on 30 March, Foreign Minister Pablo Quirno reassured that Argentina is ready to send help if the governments of the United States or Israel request assistance. Quirno added, regarding Milei's position, that "Argentina will not be neutral in the face of international terrorism." On 2 April 2026, Argentina expelled the Iranian charge d'affaires in Buenos Aires, officially severing all diplomatic ties with Iran.

On 7 April 2026, after Trump's ultimatum to Iran to open the Strait of Hormuz, the Argentine government said that its support for the US is "absolute and total." Milei added during an interview that Iran wants to exterminate the State of Israel and defended Israel as a "Western stronghold," stating that he "does not care about the lies and aberrations that the international socialist press says about Bibi Netanyahu." Milei also said that Israel defends Judeo-Christian values.

Milei announced on 17 April 2026 that he would travel for Israeli Independence Day where he is expected to be bestowed with the Israeli Presidential Medal of Honour by President Isaac Herzog for his unwavering support of the State of Israel. Milei added in an interview that Iran is an "enemy of Argentina (and) the whole world," saying that while Israel agrees to coexist with other nations, Iran instead seeks to exterminate Israelis. Milei will meet with PM Netanyahu to advance on the move of the Argentine embassy from Tel Aviv to Jerusalem. He also strongly criticized the international community for not supporting Israel and the United States military operations more, alleging that for peace, "[you] need to be prepared for war."

== Reactions ==
Argentine opposition, led by left-wing Kirchnerism, brought a project to Congress on 7 April to pass a resolution declaring Argentina's neutrality in the war regardless of President Milei's position. Myriam Bregman, Nicolás del Caño, and Christian Castillo, referents and leaders of the traditional leftist parties Socialist Workers' Party and the broader Workers' Left Front said that Milei does not represent Argentines and condemned the war and Argentina's alignment with Israel and the United States. The leader of the Civic Coalition ARI, Elisa Carrió, condemned the "darkness" of President Milei and his sister Karina Milei, calling President Milei a "buffoon of Donald Trump," whom Carrió labelled as a "madman". She also criticized Argentina's unconditional alignment with Israel, calling Prime Minister Benjamin Netanyahu "the perfect psychopath."

The party Republican Proposal expressed through its think tank led by María Eugenia Vidal that while it supports President Milei in supporting the United States and Israel, it warned against a carte blanche alignment with those two countries, which could endanger Argentina's national security, especially of the Jewish Argentine community. The chairman of Argentina's state-owned energy company YPF, Horacio Marín, said that while prices have been affected by the war, Argentina should keep working and remain aligned with the United States because Argentina could become a safe energy provider for the world in case the conflict widens in the Middle East. Marín assured that market rules are important to attract investment in Argentina and profit on the war in Iran. Daniel Dreizzen, the CEO of Aleph Energy, shared and endorsed Marín's position, assuring that Argentina can become a safe provider of energy amid the war.

Conversely, Carlos Pagni, a journalist for La Nación, wrote that Argentina's support for the United States, beyond President Milei's pro-American views, is also influenced by the economic dependence of Argentina on good relations with the United States and the issue of debt and loans, handled by Minister of Economy Luis Caputo with US Secretary of the Treasure Scott Bessent. Pagni criticized Milei and his government for involving Argentina in a war while cutting benefits and social assistance to pensioners and potentially causing a harmful effect on the country's economy.

Marc Zell, the chairman of Republicans Overseas Israel and vice-chair of Republicans Overseas wrote that Argentina is willing to send ships to assist US troops but that the British government opposes the move because of the issue of the Falkland Islands. Zell added that President Trump should reconsider the US position on the Falkland Islands sovereignty dispute, accusing the United Kingdom of taking a "cowardly position" regarding the Iran war.

Israeli Foreign Minister Gideon Sa'ar welcomed the decision to expel Iran's charge d'affaires Mohsen Soltan Tehrani, celebrating Argentina's decision. The US Bureau of Western Hemisphere Affairs praised Argentina's decision to expel the Iranian charge d'affaires, adding that the US "knows who our friends are," highlighting Argentina's position throughout the war as "firm" and "unequivocal."

The Iranian government stated through the Foreign Ministry representative for the Americas, condemning Argentina's support for the US and Israel. The chief of the region's office, Zahra Ershadi, said that Argentina's support for the "military aggression of the US and the Zionist regime" will carry international responsibility for Argentina. Ershadi further added that Milei's remarks were "anti-Iranian" and accused Milei of using the war in Iran to divert attention from corruption cases within his government.

On 24 April 2026, Reuters published a note alleging that the United States would consider supporting Argentina's claim on the Falkland Islands as a retaliation against the UK over "lack of support" for the war efforts against Iran.
