= Ibrahim Hussein Berro =

Hezbollah bomber (1973-1994)

- Born: Ibrahim Hussein Berro c. 1973; Lebanon
- Died: 18 July 1994 or 9 September 1994 (aged 21); Buenos Aires, Argentina or Lebanon
- Military career
- Allegiance: Hezbollah
- Service years: 1989–1994
- Conflicts: South Lebanon conflict (1985–2000); AMIA bombing (alleged)

Ibrahim Hussein Berro (Arabic: ابراهيم حسين برّو; c. 1973 – 1994) was a member of Hezbollah allegedly responsible for the 1994 AMIA Bombing in Buenos Aires, which killed 85 people. Berro, a 21-year-old citizen of Lebanon, is accused by Argentine, U.S. and Israeli officials of blowing up the headquarters of Argentina's Jewish community. Hezbollah describes the accusations as "categorically false".

Berro grew up in Lebanon. According to his brothers, around 1989 he changed radically, leaving school and becoming interested in Hezbollah, where his brother Ali was an active member. His mother feared Berro would end up badly, and applied for a visa for him to go to the US, where some of the family had emigrated — but the application was turned down because Berro was underage.

Berro is suspected of having entered Argentina near Ciudad del Este — a region known for smuggling, drugs, and other illegal activities — where Brazil, Paraguay, and Argentina share a border, accompanied by a man named Ahmed Saad.

The bombing, in which a van full of explosives opposite the AMIA building was detonated, was similar to the March 1992 Israeli Embassy attack in Buenos Aires, possibly also committed by Hezbollah. The attacks, it appears, occurred with the support of Iran, though the Iranian government repeatedly denied these charges.

Two months after the attack, on September 9, Berro was reported by Lebanon’s Radio Nur to have "died in combat against" the Israeli army, according to Argentine and U.S. prosecutors as an attempt to cover up his role in the attack in Argentina because they viewed the fact that his body had not been shown to his family or at his funeral with suspicion and had "established" that this clash happened on September 7 in Tallusa. After the bombing, Berro's wife received $300 a month from Hezbollah.

In late 2005, Berro was identified as the bombing perpetrator after years of investigation and speculation into who committed the bombing. According to official Argentine government prosecutor, Alberto Nisman, Hussein's two US-based brothers had testified that he had joined the radical Shia militant group Hezbollah. "The brothers' testimony was substantial, rich in detail and showed that he was the one who was killed," Nisman added. A U.S. House resolution in July 2004 declared Berro was the suicide bomber, but the identification was not declared positively until November 2005 after Berro's relatives in Detroit identified his photograph. Berro was also recognized with "80 percent certainty" by eyewitness Nicolasa Romero, who saw the driver in the van near the AMIA building. Some Argentine journalists, however, have expressed reservations about these alleged findings; in an op-ed for La Nación, Jorge Urien Berri objected "[for a case where] extreme caution is warranted […] especially [due to a report offering nothing new regarding the plot behind the attack … to those who insist] on treating unproven hypotheses as fact", and contested Berro's involvement in the incidents. Berro's two brothers also had denied this version in April 2005 before a US prosecutor, stating that Berro had died on September 9, 1994, during combat in Lebanon. No proper autopsies or DNA tests were done. The police dumped in a bin the head thought to be that of the bomber.

Berro's brother, after apparently identifying Berro in a photograph, now denies that Berro had any role in the attack. "They changed the truth," he said. "I gave them the photo [of Berro] at 17 years old, but when I saw photo in the news, I said, 'How are they publishing the photo that I gave them a few months back? They said in the news that I identified the photo, and it's not true. I gave them the photo of him at 17, but I don't know who is in the others."

In a May 2007 interview, James Cheek, Clinton's Ambassador to Argentina at the time of the bombing, told La Nación, "To my knowledge, there was never any real evidence [of Iranian responsibility]. They never came up with anything." The hottest lead in the case, he recalled, was an Iranian defector named Manoucher Moatamer, who "supposedly had all this information." But Moatamer turned out to be only a dissatisfied low-ranking official without the knowledge of government decision-making that he had claimed. "We finally decided that he wasn't credible," Cheek recalled. Ron Goddard, then deputy chief of the US Mission in Buenos Aires, confirmed Cheek's account. He recalled that investigators found nothing linking Iran to the bombing. "The whole Iran thing seemed kind of flimsy," Goddard said.
