= Amer Mohamed Akil Rada =

Hezbollah operative

Amer Mohamed Akil Rada is a Lebanese-Colombian Hezbollah operative. According to the United States and Argentina, Rada is a senior member of Hezbollah's External Security Organization and was an operational member involved in the 1994 AMIA bombing that killed 85 people.

== Biography ==
Rada was born on either 7 September 1964, or 10 December 1967. According to the United States Department of Treasury, Rada was a senior member of Hezbollah's External Security Organization, responsible for the organization's operations outside of Lebanon. While in South America for more than 10 years, Rada coordinated Hezbollah's commercial operations, such as the shipment of coal from Colombia to Lebanon. The United States asserts that as much as 80 percent of Rada's commercial benefits went to the organization. In addition to his business activities, during the 1990s Rada cased targets around South America with Hezbollah official Salman Raouf Salman and was an operational member of Hezbollah who carried out the 1994 AMIA bombing at the community center that served the largest Jewish community in South America. Rada was also involved in the 1992 attack on Israeli embassy in Buenos Aires.

Rada reportedly fled South America to return to Lebanon in 2014. He established a charcoal trading company in Lebanon, sharing ownership with his two daughters.

On 12 September 2023, Rada was designated a Specially Designated Terrorist by the U.S. Department of the Treasury.
