= Gabriel Davidovich =

Ashkenazi Chief Rabbi of Argentina

Gabriel Davidovich is the Ashkenazi Chief Rabbi of Argentina. He is based at the AMIA Jewish center, where he has led the community since 2013. In February 2019, he was violently assaulted in an antisemitic attack at his Buenos Aires home. The assailants broke nine of his ribs, affecting a lung, and left him disfigured. The attackers restrained his wife and took money before fleeing.

Investigators are examining whether the attack on Davidovich may have been ordered in revenge for a rabbinical ruling.

Buenos Aires Police have apprehended five suspects believed to be linked to the attack.
