= Quebracho (group) =

Argentine political organization

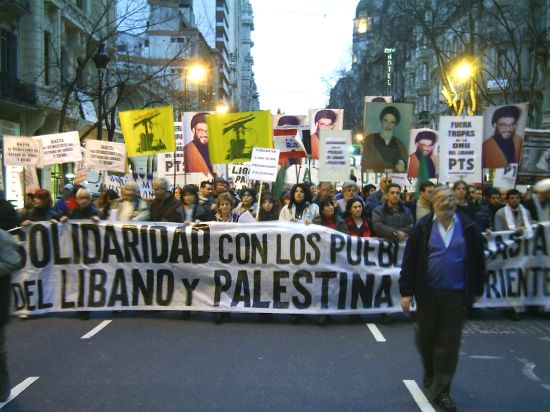
Quebracho demonstrating against Zionism

Quebracho ([keˈβɾatʃo], "axe-breaker", referring to hard wood), officially the Revolutionary Patriotic Movement Quebracho (Movimiento Patriótico Revolucionario Quebracho) is a far-left group in Argentina which describes itself as "a political organization that fights for the national and social liberation of our country. For a just peace, economic independence, and political sovereignty. For the National Anti-Imperialist Revolution."

Quebracho promotes the abolition of private property and the reduction of poverty. Its aggressive and confrontational tactics have brought it into conflict with some other leftist organizations, and it is not included in any political coalition on the left side of the spectrum.

Fernando Esteche, who also teaches at the Faculty of Journalism in La Universidad de La Plata, is the top public leader of Quebracho. He was prosecuted and jailed on charges stemming from political violence during a march on April 5, 2007, but was freed in October 2007.

In unrelated charges, Esteche and fellow Quebracho leader "Boli" were sentenced to more than three years for "political intimidation" in the escrache of Argentine governor Jorge Sobisch. The sentence was affirmed on appeal by the Argentine Supreme Court and was scheduled to begin by December 3, 2013.

== 2006 incidents ==
On August 30, Quebracho participated in a demonstration supporting Hezbollah and against the State of Israel in the context of the 2006 Israel-Lebanon conflict in front of the Israeli embassy in Buenos Aires. After meeting with the Argentinian Interior Minister, DAIA and AMIA leaders filed a lawsuit against Quebracho on September 1 at the Federal Court, accusing it of incitement and disturbing public order. Kirszenbaum and Luis Grynwald, AMIA’s president, told the court that Quebracho "gives us enormous preoccupation and sadness as Argentines," not just as Jewish leaders. AMIA board member Edgardo Gorenberg described Quebracho as "a threat to democracy," saying it "recalls the darkest" parts of Argentine history.
