= Freedom of religion in South America by country =

The status of religious freedom in South America varies from country to country. States can differ based on whether or not they guarantee equal treatment under law for followers of different religions, whether they establish a state religion (and the legal implications that this has for both practitioners and non-practitioners), the extent to which religious organizations operating within the country are policed, and the extent to which religious law is used as a basis for the country's legal code.

There are further discrepancies between some countries' self-proclaimed stances of religious freedom in law and the actual practice of authority bodies within those countries: a country's establishment of religious equality in their constitution or laws does not necessarily translate into freedom of practice for residents of the country. Additionally, similar practices (such as having religious organizations register with the government) can have different consequences depending on other sociopolitical circumstances specific to the countries in question.

Every country in South America includes a provision for the freedom of religion in its constitution. A few countries have explicitly outlawed discrimination along religious lines. While no country in South America has an official state religion, some confer preferential treatment to the Catholic Church. Antisemitic vandalism has been reported in three countries in South America.

== Argentina ==
Article 14 of the Constitution of Argentina guarantees all the inhabitants of the Nation the right "to profess freely their religion." The Constitution further requires the government to support Roman Catholicism economically, and the government pays salaries for Roman Catholic bishops. Despite this, the Supreme Court has ruled that the Roman Catholic Church was not granted the status of official religion by the constitution or any federal legislation.

A 2011 poll conducted by the Gino Germani Research Institute of the University of Buenos Aires on behalf of the Anti-Defamation League and Delegación de Asociaciones Israelitas Argentinas showed that a majority of Argentines held antisemitic sentiments or prejudices. There have been a number of antisemitic incidents recorded in Argentina since 2010, largely in the form of verbal abuse and vandalism.

== Bolivia ==
The constitution of Bolivia establishes the freedom of religion and a separation between church and state. The constitution further prohibits discrimination along religious lines.

Religious organizations are required to register with the Ministry of Foreign Affairs, with the exception of the Catholic Church, whose registration is waived due to an agreement between the Bolivian government and the Holy See. A separate class of groups called "spiritual organizations", and which roughly corresponds to indigenous religious groups in Bolivia, is also required to register with the government and does so through a process that is similar to that used by religious organizations, although the registration fees for spiritual organizations are lower.

Both private and public schools have the option to include religious studies in their curricula; all schools are required to teach ethics courses which emphasize religious tolerance.

Some smaller churches in the evangelical Christian community have refused to register with the government, citing concerns for their privacy. While these groups have been unable to open bank accounts or hold property, the state has not otherwise interfered with their religious practice.

In the past, Christian groups have alleged that the government shows a preference toward indigenous religious groups and practices. In rural areas of the country, hostility by indigenous communities against Christian missionaries has been reported; in some cases, these incidents have included cases of "indigenous leaders hitting pastors".

== Brazil ==
Religious freedom has been part of Brazil as law since January 7, 1890, codified by a decree signed by President Deodoro da Fonseca in the then-newly established Republic. It has been a Constitutional right since the 1946 Constitution was enacted, up to and including the current 1988 Constitution of Brazil.

The Federal Constitution of Brazil establishes as a fundamental right the freedom of religion, prescribing that Brazil is a secular country, that is, the state cannot adopt, encourage or promote any god or religion. In its article 19, the Federal Constitution of Brazil also prohibits to all Brazilian federative entities the establishment of religious cults.

In practice, all religions in Brazil are respected, but none promoted. However, personal beliefs, which includes religious creed, often influence the democratic political decisions. Some notable public and political spaces such as the Chamber of Deputies contain crucifixes, which has been criticized as being against the secular law.

January 7 is the National Day of Religious Freedom in Brazil.

== Chile ==
The constitution Chile provides for the freedom of religion, although it stipulates that this freedom must be not be “opposed to morals, to good customs or to the public order". It further establishes a separation between church and state, and other laws prohibit religious discrimination.

Religious organizations are not required to register with the government, but may do so to receive tax breaks. Religious groups may appoint chaplains to provide services in hospitals and prisons. Officially registered groups may appoint chaplains for the military.

All schools are required to provide two hours of religious per week, tailored to the religious affiliations of the students. Parents may also choose to excuse their children from such classes.

According to Christian Solidarity Worldwide, arsonists attacked Baptist and Catholic churches in the primarily indigenous Mapuche communities in the rural Araucania Region in 2017. According to other sources, the church attacks fit into a pattern of sabotage directed at a wide range of institutions, business interests, and infrastructure in Araucania, and thus may not necessarily have been intended as a religiously motivated attack. As of the end of 2017, a trial was still pending for the arson suspects, and the regional government verbally committed itself to helping rebuild the churches. Arson attacks have continued for several years.

Leaders of the Jewish community have expressed concerns about incidences of antisemitic vandalism and social media posts targeting Jews.

The National Office of Religious Affairs promotes dialogue between faith groups and the government.

== Colombia ==
The Colombian Constitution of 1991 guarantees freedom of religion and maintains that all religious faiths are equally free before the law. The government of Colombia does not collect religious statistics in its censuses.

In 2023, the country was scored 4 out of 4 for religious freedom.

== Ecuador ==
Freedom of religion in Ecuador is guaranteed by the country's constitution, and the government generally respects this right in practice. Religious groups are allowed to engage in missionary activities, and private schools are allowed to provide religious instruction, although the government does not allow religious instruction in public schools.

In 2023, the country was scored 4 out of 4 for religious freedom.

== Guyana ==
The Constitution of Guyana provides for freedom of religion. According to the 2012 national census, 64% of the population identify as Christian (mainly Pentecostal), 25% as Hindu, and 7% as Muslim (mainly Sunni).

In 2023, the country was scored 4 out of 4 for religious freedom.

== Paraguay ==
Freedom of religion in Paraguay is provided in the Constitution of Paraguay. The law at all levels protects this right in full against abuse, either by governmental or private actors, and the constitution provides for conscientious objection to military service. The constitution recognizes the historical role of the Catholic Church (the dominant religion). Although the government is secular in name and practice, most government officials are Catholic, and Catholic clergy occasionally speak during official government events.

The law forbids religious instruction in public schools; private schools may offer this.

In the past, antisemitic and pro-Nazi messages and symbols, including graffiti, have appeared; the government investigated but did not identify suspects. In July 2007 the newspaper ABC Color published an antisemitic article.

== Peru ==
The constitution of Peru, along with numerous laws and policies, protects the freedom of religion. However, non-Catholic groups have continuously struggled to obtain the same freedoms given to those who are Catholic and are unable to receive certain benefits provided to those in the Catholic Church. In Article 50 of the Constitution, it states that the state "extends its contribution" to the Catholic Church and "may" to other religions.

The 2017 national census reported the population as 76% Catholic (81 percent in 2007), 14% Protestant, 5.1% nonreligious and 4.9% other religious groups. In the past, minority religious groups have criticized religious freedom laws, claiming they do not address the problem of inequality, and can be discriminatory and unconstitutional. Many Peruvians continue to have problems with Christian religious groups who impose their culture on those populations who have different beliefs and ways of life. However, Peru has taken many steps toward establishing more legal rights for numerous religious groups. Through the development of the Office of Interfaith Affairs, Peru has worked to address problems with religious tolerance. Many minority groups have said that they were pleased with adjustments made by the government in 2011 and 2016 to reduce favoritism toward the Catholic Church and relax organization registration requirements. Even though there are still inequalities to be addressed when it comes to religious freedom, the Peruvian government has worked to combat problems surrounding non-Catholic religious groups, and continues to push for institutional equality.

== Suriname ==
The constitution of Suriname establishes the freedom of religion and outlaws discrimination along religious lines. "Instigating religious hatred" is punishable by fines, and in some cases prison.

Religious groups may register with the government in order to receive financial support. Most groups are registered.

Religious instruction is not allowed in public schools. Private religious schools are allowed, and comprise roughly half of the primary and secondary schools in Suriname. These private schools are partially subsidized by the government. Parents are not allowed to homeschool children for religious reasons.

The government engages in vocal support of religious diversity and tolerance, and recognizes the holidays of various religious traditions present in the country as national holidays. The armed forces have chaplains for the Hindu, Muslim, Catholic, and Protestant faiths.

== Uruguay ==
The constitution of Uruguay provides for the freedom of religion and states that "the State supports no religion"; discrimination on religious grounds is illegal. The INDDHH, an autonomous branch of parliament, and the Honorary Commission Against Racism, Xenophobia, and All Other Forms of Discrimination (CHRXD), comprising various government agencies and NGOs, enforce government compliance with antidiscrimination laws; both organizations provide free legal resources to complainants.

Religious groups may register with the government as nonprofit organizations in order to receive tax breaks. Local government regulates the use of public land for burials. Many departments allow for all religious groups to use public cemeteries.

Public schools do not offer religious classes. Although public schools close for certain Christian holidays, the government does not refer to these holidays by their Christian names. Students belonging to other religions may miss classes to observe their religious traditions without penalty. Private schools may decide which holidays to observe.

The Jewish community has been targeted by antisemitic rhetoric on Uruguayan websites and social media; a teacher was found guilty of Holocaust-denial in 2022.

In 2017 there were tensions between the Catholic Church and the government of Montevideo due to the government's refusal to install a statue of the Virgin Mary on a major public road. Church representatives alleged that this was particularly controversial because the government had previously approved statues of Confucius and Yemọja along the road. Supporters of the Virgin Mary statue used its rejection as a justification for opposing requests from the Muslim community of Montevideo to use land in the public ceremony for Muslim burial rites. As of the end of 2017, the Muslim community's request was pending.

== Venezuela ==
The constitution of Venezuela provides for the freedom of religion insofar as it does not violate "public morality or decency". A 2017 constitutional law criminalizes "incitement to hatred" or violence, including provisions specifically concerning the incitement of hatred against religious groups.

Religious organizations must register with the government in order to obtain legal status; the Directorate of Justice and Religion, part of the Ministry of Interior, Justice and Peace, manages registrations, disburses funds to registered organizations, and promotes religious tolerance.

Religious education is allowed in public schools, although it is not part of any official curriculum proposed by the government. Chaplain services in the military are available only for Catholics.

Leaders of religious organizations who are vocal critics of the government faced verbal harassment by regime leaders. Jewish community leaders have accused state-funded media and some government officials of engaging in antisemitic rhetoric.
