= AMIA bombing =

1994 attack on a Jewish Community Centre in Buenos Aires, Argentina

- Part of the Iran–Israel proxy conflict
- The aftermath of the attack
- Location: 34°36′06.5″S 58°23′58″W; Buenos Aires, Argentina
- Date: 18 July 1994; 32 years ago 9:53 a.m. (UTC−03:00)
- Target: Asociación Mutual Israelita Argentina
- Attack type: Suicide attack, car bombing
- Deaths: 86 (including 1 bomber)
- Injuries: 300+
- Perpetrator: Suspected Hezbollah and Iranian involvement: Responsibility reportedly claimed by Ansar Allah, a Hezbollah-allied Palestinian group
- Assailant: Ibrahim Hussein Berro
- Motive: Retaliation for Argentina reneging on nuclear agreements with Iran

The Asociación Mutual Israelita Argentina (AMIA; transl. "Argentine Israelite Mutual Association"), a Jewish community center in Buenos Aires, Argentina, was bombed on 18 July 1994. Executed as a suicide attack, a bomb-laden van was driven into the AMIA building and subsequently detonated, killing 85 people and injuring over 300. To date, the bombing remains the deadliest terrorist attack in Argentine history. In 1994, Argentina was home to a Jewish community of 200,000, making it the largest in Latin America and the sixth-largest in the world outside of Israel.

Over the years, the AMIA bombing has been marked by accusations of cover-ups. All suspects in the "local connection" (among them, many members of the Buenos Aires Provincial Police) were found to be not guilty in September 2004. In August 2005, federal judge Juan José Galeano, who was in charge of the case, was impeached and removed from his post on a charge of "serious irregularities" due to his mishandling of the investigation. In 2005, Catholic Church cardinal Jorge Mario Bergoglio, who became Pope Francis in 2013, was the first public personality to sign a petition for justice in the AMIA bombing case. He was one of the signatories on a document called "85 victims, 85 signatures" as part of the bombing's 11th anniversary.

On 25 October 2006, Argentine prosecutors Alberto Nisman and Marcelo Martínez Burgos formally accused the Iranian government of directing the bombing, and the Lebanese Islamist militant group Hezbollah of carrying it out. According to the prosecution's claims in 2006, Argentina had been targeted by Iran after Buenos Aires' decision to suspend a nuclear technology transfer contract to Tehran. This has been disputed as the contract was never terminated, and Iran and Argentina were negotiating on the restoration of full cooperation on all bilateral agreements from early 1992 until 1994, when the bombing occurred.

In 2024, an Argentine court ruled that Iran directed the attack, and that it was carried out by Hezbollah. The ruling also characterized Iran as a terrorist state.

== Bombing ==
On 18 July 1994, a suicide bomber drove a Renault Trafic van bomb loaded with about 275 kilograms (600 lb) of ammonium nitrate fertilizer and fuel oil explosive mixture, into the Jewish Community Center building located in a densely constructed commercial area of Buenos Aires. The explosive is thought to have been arranged to focus the blast on the building 3 to 5 metres (10 to 16 ft) away, exhibiting a shaped charge or explosively formed penetrator effect. The exterior walls of this five-story building were of brick masonry construction, which supported the floor slabs. The air blast from the bomb totally destroyed the exposed load-bearing walls which, in turn, led to progressive failure of the floor slabs and virtually total collapse of the building. Such bearing-wall buildings are notable for their tendency to be brought down in this manner by localized damage.

=== Other bombings ===
The bombing came two years after the 17 March 1992 bombing of the Israeli Embassy in Buenos Aires which killed 29 and wounded 242, and was Argentina's deadliest attack until the AMIA bombing. The Islamic Jihad Organization, which according to Robert Baer operates under the umbrella of Hezbollah and is linked to Iran, claimed responsibility for that bombing. It was suspected that the AMIA bombing was connected to the embassy attack. To date, authorities have been unable to locate those responsible for either of the two bombings.

The day after the AMIA attack, a suicide bombing on a Panamanian commuter plane killed all 21 passengers, 12 of whom were Jews. Investigators determined that the bombing was perpetrated by a "Lya Jamal" – thought to be "an Arab traveling under an alias, using fraudulently obtained Colombian documents."

Eight days after the AMIA attack, the Israeli embassy in London was car-bombed, and thirteen hours later a similar car bomb exploded outside a Jewish community centre in London. No one was killed but 22 were injured and "millions of pounds of damage" was done. Five Palestinians were later arrested in London and two convicted and sentenced to 20 years in prison in connection with the bombings.

== Investigation and responsibility ==
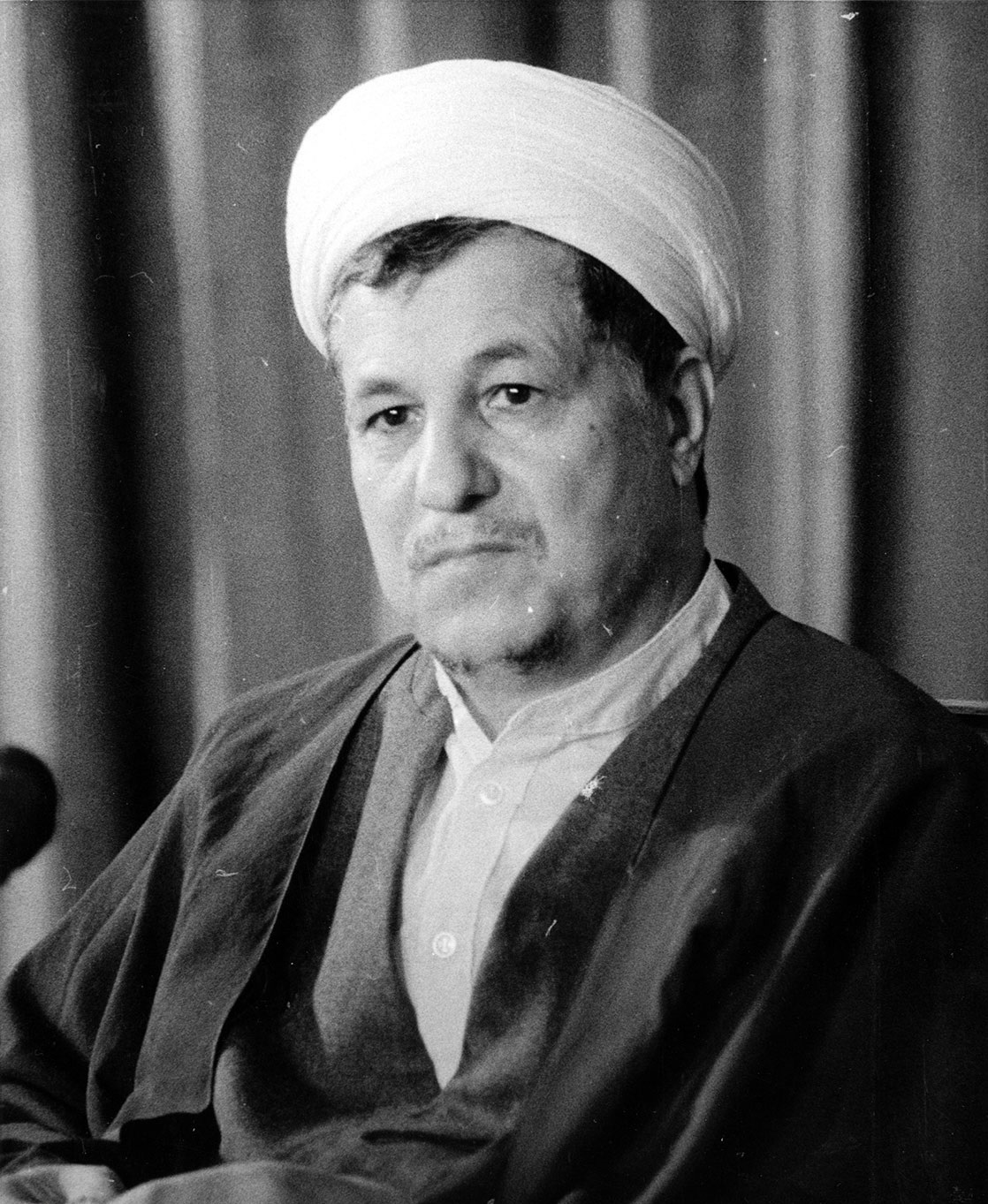
Argentina requested Interpol to place Iranian President Akbar Hashemi Rafsanjani on its wanted list

The prosecutor Alberto Nisman accused Iran in 2006 of directing the attack, and the Hezbollah militia of carrying it out.

In 2018 judicial authorities announced that former President Cristina Fernandez de Kirchner would face trial on charges she covered up the role of Iranians in bombing. Federal Judge Claudio Bonadio said that eleven other former officials and people close to Kirchner's government would also be tried on charges of cover-up and abuse of power. Kirchner has denied the charges.

No suspects have been convicted for the bombing and there have been a number of allegations made, with later investigations charging the government of Iran. The investigations were marred by incompetence. In 1999 an arrest warrant was issued against Hezbollah member Imad Mugniyah in connection with the attack. Argentine justice accused Tehran in 2006 of being behind the attacks, and indicted several senior Iranian officials, including Hashemi Rafsanjani and Ahmad Vahidi, as well as Hezbollah's Imad Mughniyah. It was speculated that Hezbollah was exacting revenge for Israel killing 40 people in Baalbek, Lebanon on 2 June 1994. In 2007, several of the charged were placed on Interpol's most wanted list, though bylaws prevented listing top officials such as Rafsanjani. As of 2017 the charged suspects (who remain alive) remain fugitives. In August 2021, two of the charged suspects, Ahmad Vahidi and Mohsen Rezaee, were appointed to government of Ebrahim Raisi in the posts of interior minister and vice president of economic affairs, respectively.

=== Claim of responsibility ===
Shortly after the attack Ansar Allah, a Palestinian Jihadist organization widely held as a front for Hezbollah, reportedly claimed responsibility for the attack, and for the Alas Chiricanas Flight 901 bombing via leaflets distributed in Sidon and a communique in the Lebanese newspaper An-Nahar.

=== Ibrahim Hussein Berro ===
Israeli diplomatic sources who read the "final" report by SIDE on the attack said in 2003 that the attack was a suicide bombing carried out by Ibrahim Hussein Berro, a 21-year-old Hezbollah operative, and that he had been subsequently honored with a "martyrdom" plaque in Southern Lebanon. In 2005, Argentine and U.S. prosecutors objected to the September 9 date alleged by Hezbollah in which he "died in combat against" the Israeli army as an attempt to cover up his role in the attack because they viewed the fact that his body had not been shown to his family or at his funeral with suspicion and had "established" that this clash happened on September 7 in Tallusa. This investigation was carried out jointly with the U.S. Federal Bureau of Investigation (FBI). Hussein had been identified by FBI and Argentine intelligence, and corroborated by at least three witnesses. According to official Argentine government prosecutor, Alberto Nisman, Hussein's two U.S.-based brothers had testified that he had joined the radical Shia militant group Hezbollah. "The brothers' testimony was substantial, rich in detail and showed that he was the one who was killed," Nisman added.

A BBC correspondent reported that independent investigators were skeptical, and they pointed out repeated incompetence and deception in the official investigation. No proper autopsies or DNA tests were done. The police had also simply dumped a head, thought to be that of the bomber, into a bin.

On 5 July 2017, The Algemeiner reported that DNA, not assignable to any of the victims, has been identified. This new evidence will allow investigators to test the prevailing suspicion that the bombing was committed by Ibrahim Hussein Berro.

=== Juan José Galeano's investigations ===
Federal judge Juan José Galeano followed investigations concerning the "local connection", which included members of the Policía Bonaerense (Buenos Aires Provincial Police). He quickly arrested Carlos Telleldín, alleged to have provided the van used in the bombing, and some 20 officers from the Bonaerense. But a video broadcast on Argentine TV showed him offering Telleldín $400,000, in return for evidence, which led to Galeano's removal from the case in 2003, and his impeachment in August 2005.

Judge Galeano had also issued warrants for the arrests of 12 Iranians, including Hade Soleimanpour, Iran's ambassador to Argentina in 1994. The latter was arrested in the UK on 21 August 2003, at the request of the Argentine authorities. He was later released because, according to the Home Office, there was not even enough evidence presented to make a prima facie case for the extradition to proceed.

Judge Galeano also interviewed Abolghasem Mesbahi, aka "Witness C", an alleged former Iranian intelligence officer who reportedly said a former Argentine president accepted a $10 million payment from Tehran to block the investigation. Former President Carlos Menem denied the claims, but admitted he had a secret Swiss bank account following a report in The New York Times. Menem claimed in 2004 that the attack had been related to his support to the US during the First Gulf War and to his visit to Israel during his mandate. Abolghasem Mesbahi claimed to the Argentine court that Iran had planned the bombing, thinking the centre was a base for the Israeli secret service.

On 2 September 2004, all suspects in the "local connection" (among whom members of the Buenos Aires police) of AMIA case were found to be not guilty. Five persons, including four policemen, were therefore acquitted because of lack of evidence.

On 3 August 2005, Judge Galeano's impeachment was successful, and he was formally removed from his post as a federal judge for "serious" irregularities and his mishandling of the investigation. Judge Galeano has denied these allegations.

In March 2005, Swiss judge Jacques Antenen, in charge of investigations concerning the murder of an Iranian dissident, re-opened the case concerning Iranian intelligence service bank accounts in Switzerland. The same account would have been used both for this assassination and for the alleged payment of ex-President Carlos Menem. Swiss Justice had already been notified of the existence of an account owned by the Red Spark Foundation (based in Liechtenstein), in which Ramón Hernández, former secretary of Carlos Menem, had authority to sign documents. Six million dollars would have been deposited in this account, although in some moment the exact amount was said to be of $10 million.

In 2006, the Court of Cassation declared that the previous court had made a false version of the investigated acts in order to cover irresponsibilities.

=== Investigations under Néstor Kirchner's government ===
Néstor Kirchner's government issued a decree in July 2005 formally accepting a share of the blame for the failure of investigations about the attack. He called the unresolved investigations a "national disgrace." President Kirchner said governments had covered up facts, and that the decree established a mechanism for victims to receive compensation. Shortly after assuming his functions in spring 2003, he opened up Argentine intelligence files on the case, and lifted a decree preventing SIDE agents from testifying in the case.

Argentina's justice, Israel, and the United States suspected in 2005 that Hezbollah was behind the attack, with backing from Iran. Hezbollah has denied responsibility. The Iranian government maintains its innocence, condemning the terrorist attack and calling for urgent punishment of those responsible.

On 25 October 2006, prosecutors in Buenos Aires formally charged Iran and Shi'a militia Hezbollah with the bombing, accusing the Iranian authorities of directing Hezbollah to carry out the attack and calling for the arrest of former President of Iran Ayatollah Hashemi Rafsanjani and seven others, including some who still hold official positions in Iran.

The Justice of Argentine called for the arrest of top Iranian authorities. The Iranian defense minister, Ahmad Vahidi was accused of masterminding the attack.

Argentine's government required the extradition of those accused of the attack but Iran has always refused to accept the verdict of the Argentine's Justice.

In November 2007, Interpol on behalf of the Argentine government, published the names of six individuals (Imad Mughniyah, Ali Fallahijan, Mohsen Rabbani, Ahmad Reza Asghari, Ahmad Vahidi and Mohsen Rezaee) officially accused for their role in the terrorist attack. They were entered in the Interpol red notice list.

On 26 October 2006, speaking on state radio, Iranian foreign ministry spokesman Mohammad Ali Hoseyni described the accusations against the country as "a Zionist plot". Both Hezbollah and Iran deny any involvement in the bombing. According to Hoseyni, the accusations were intended to divert "world attention from the perpetration of crimes by the Zionists against women and children in Palestine".

On 6 March 2007, former Congressman Mario Cafiero and former government official Luis D'Elia said they had traveled to Iran where they had received "evidence" from the Iranian government. The evidence alleged that two of the AMIA witnesses were "terrorist dissidents". They also said that there were arrest warrants issued by Interpol for the other two Iranians, Hadi Roshanravani and Hamid Reza Eshagi. D'Elia accused the United States government of reaching an "agreement" with the AMIA witnesses in exchange for their testimony. Laura Ginsber, head of APEMIA ("Agrupacion por el Esclarecimiento de la Masacre Impue de la AMIA) responded that D'Elia's trip to Iran was "not innocent", and that it could be linked with "trying to generate business with Iran".

=== Developments under Cristina Fernández de Kirchner's government ===
In November 2008, Carlos Menem was called to testify in an upcoming trial over the AMIA case.

In March 2009, a former investigator in the case, Claudio Lifschitz, claimed he was abducted and tortured by men who told him not to investigate SIDE's involvement in the case.

In August 2009, BBC News reported that Ahmad Vahidi had become Iran's defense minister-designate under the 2009 Mahmoud Ahmadinejad administration, and is on Interpol's wanted list over the AMIA bombing. Vahidi led a unit of Iran's Revolutionary Guard called Quds Force at the time of the attack, and has been accused of planning the bombings. Iran dismissed this development as a "Zionist plot". On 1 June 2011, Bolivia apologized to Argentina for Ahmad Vahidi's unannounced visit to the country, and announced that he would be leaving Bolivia immediately.

On 31 March 2012, Menem was ordered to stand trial for obstruction of justice in the probe of the AMIA bombing. Menem is accused of helping to cover up the tracks of local accomplices of the attackers.

In 2012, Argentina's President Cristina Fernández de Kirchner announced at the United Nations General Assembly that Iran and Argentina would meet to discuss Iranian involvement in the attacks. In 2014 she also criticized her country's Jewish leaders for not supporting Argentina's pact with Iran in order to jointly investigate the 1994 AMIA bombing attack:

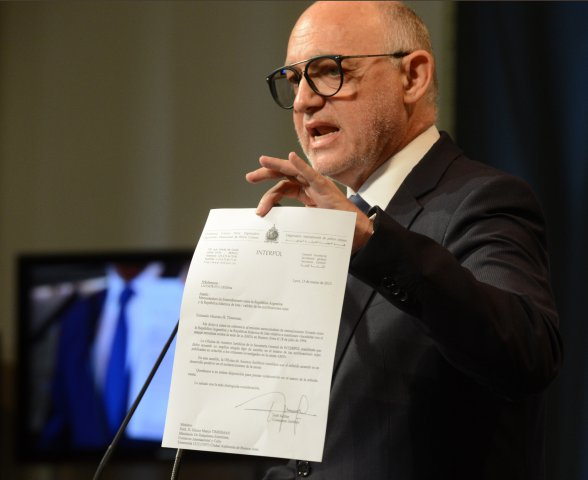
Argentine Foreign Minister Héctor Timerman shows the "red alerts" against the imputed Iranian citizens, to "unmask the lies of Nisman," as he said.

My country is the only country of the Americas other than the United States of America that was the target of terrorist attacks: one in 1992 when the embassy of Israel was blown up, and the second in 1994 when the headquarters of the Asociación Mutual Israelita Argentina (AMIA) was bombed. This year marks the twentieth anniversary of the bombing of AMIA. I dare say before this Assembly—in the presence of some of the family members of the victims who have always been with us—that the Government headed by President Kirchner did the utmost and went the greatest lengths to uncover the real culprits, not only because it opened all my country's intelligence files and created a special prosecutor investigation unit, but also because, when in 2006 the justice system of my country accused Iranian citizens of involvement in the bombing of AMIA, I myself was the only President who dared to propose asking the Islamic Republic of Iran to cooperate with and assist in the investigation. That request was made intermittently from 2007 to 2011, until the Islamic Republic of Iran finally agreed to a bilateral meeting, allowing it to be included in the agenda. That meeting led to the signing by both countries of a memorandum of understanding on legal cooperation that allowed for the Iranian citizens who had been accused, and who live in Tehran, to be deposed before the judge. But what happened when we signed that memorandum? It seemed as if all hell had broken out, both nationally and internationally. The Jewish associations that had sought our support for so many years and that had come here with us to ask for help turned against us, and when an agreement was finally reached on legal cooperation they accused us of complicity with the State of Iran. The same thing happened here in the United States. When the vulture funds lobbied before the United States Congress, they accused us of collaborating with the Islamic Republic of Iran, which at the time was known as the Terrorist State of Iran. They even lobbied on their websites, posting pictures of me on the Internet with former President Ahmadinejad as if we were business partners. Just this week, we learned that the iconic Waldorf Astoria hotel, in this city, was the setting for a meeting between the Secretary of State of this country and his Iranian counterpart. We are not criticizing them. Quite the contrary, anything that represents dialogue and understanding seems very good to us. But we wish to ask those who have been accusing Iran of being a terrorist State.

Argentina's Foreign Minister Hector Timerman and Iranian Foreign Minister Ali Akbar Salehi met on the sidelines of the UN in New York and promised to continue talks until the 1990s bombings are resolved.

== Memorandum of understanding ==
Memorandum of understanding between the Government of Argentina and the Government of Islamic Republic of Iran on the issues related to the terrorist attack against AMIA headquarter in Buenos Aires on 18 July 1994
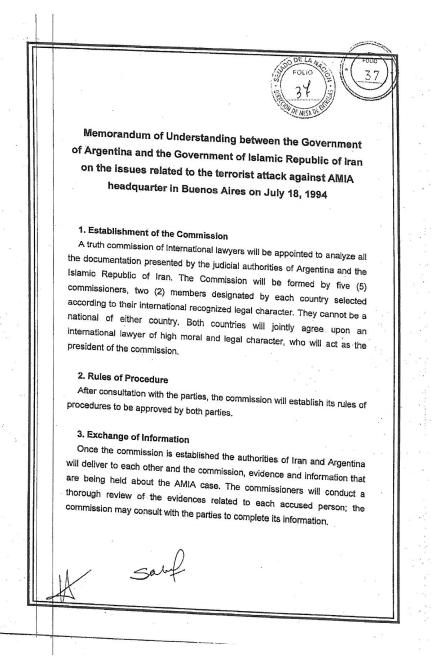
- First page of the memorandum
- Created: 2013
- Date effective: Never
- Repealed: 2015
- Signatories: Argentina (withdrew), Iran
- Purpose: Investigation of the 1994 AMIA bombing terrorist attack in Argentina

On 27 January 2013, the Government of Argentina announced it had signed a memorandum of understanding with Iran to establish a "truth commission" to investigate the AMIA bombing. The full name was Memorandum of understanding between the Government of Argentina and the Government of Islamic Republic of Iran on the issues related to the terrorist attack against AMIA headquarter in Buenos Aires on 18 July 1994.

According to President Kirchner, one of the proponents for the memorandum, the commission was established to "analyze all the documentation presented to date by the judicial authorities of Argentina and Iran...and to give its vision and issue a report with recommendations about how the case should proceed within the legal and regulatory framework of both parties."

The news generated several criticisms with David Harris from the American Jewish Committee stating that "the idea of establishing a 'truth' commission on the AMIA tragedy that involves the Iranian regime would be like asking Nazi Germany to help establish the facts of Kristallnacht". The U.S. State Department's top official in charge of Latin American affairs, Assistant Secretary of State Roberta Jacobson, said she is "skeptical that a just solution can be found" through the Argentine-Iran "truth-commission." The Jewish community in Argentina issued the statement "to ignore everything that Argentine justice has done and to replace it with a commission that, in the best of cases, will issue, without any defined deadline, a 'recommendation' to the parties constitutes, without doubt, a reversal in the common objective of obtaining justice."

The memorandum agreed to enable the questioning of the Iranians accused by Nisman and to establish a "truth commission" to analyze evidence related to the accused persons. As the Kirchners had the majority at both chambers of the Argentine Congress, the bill was approved without problem. Nisman opposed the memorandum, and argued that it "constitutes a wrongful interference of the Executive Branch". The Delegación de Asociaciones Israelitas Argentinas, the umbrella organization of Argentina's Jewish community, filled a petition to declare it unconstitutional, pointing evidence of Iranian involvement in the attack. The memorandum was declared unconstitutional, and the government appealed the ruling. Because of this trial, and the lack of Iranian approval, the memorandum did not enter into force. The appeal was evaluated by the Court of Cassation, the highest criminal court of the country. The process was delayed by the controversial removal of judge Luis Maria Cabral, who was replaced with another judge more supportive of the government's agenda.

Nisman also denounced the president Cristina Fernández de Kirchner and the chancellor Héctor Timerman of cover-up, for the signing of the memorandum. He was found dead in his home the day before he could present his case to the Congress; the case on his murder is still open as well. The denounce against Fernández de Kirchner was swiftly archived.

On 28 February 2013, the Argentine Chamber of Deputies approved the memorandum of understanding with Iran by 131 votes in favor to 113 votes against. Israel expressed disappointment at this development. Guillermo Borger, president of the AMIA, criticized the legality of the memorandum and announced that he would take it to the Supreme Court of Argentina.

Although in 2013 the Argentine Congress approved the bill regarding the memorandum, the Iranian Parliament did not.

In May 2014, the memorandum was declared unconstitutional by the Court.

The Front for Victory lost the 2015 presidential elections, and Mauricio Macri became the new president on 10 December. He immediately instructed the minister of Justice Germán Garavano to withdraw the appeal, which ratified the ruling that declared it unconstitutional. This was praised by the Prime Minister of Israel Benjamin Netanyahu: "This is a welcome change of direction, and I hope we will see a significant improvement of Argentina-Israeli relations as well as a change for the better in relations with other countries in South America in the coming years".

It was declared as voided by the Argentine Federal Chamber of Cassation in December 2015, shortly after the inauguration of former Argentine president Mauricio Macri.

== Recent developments ==
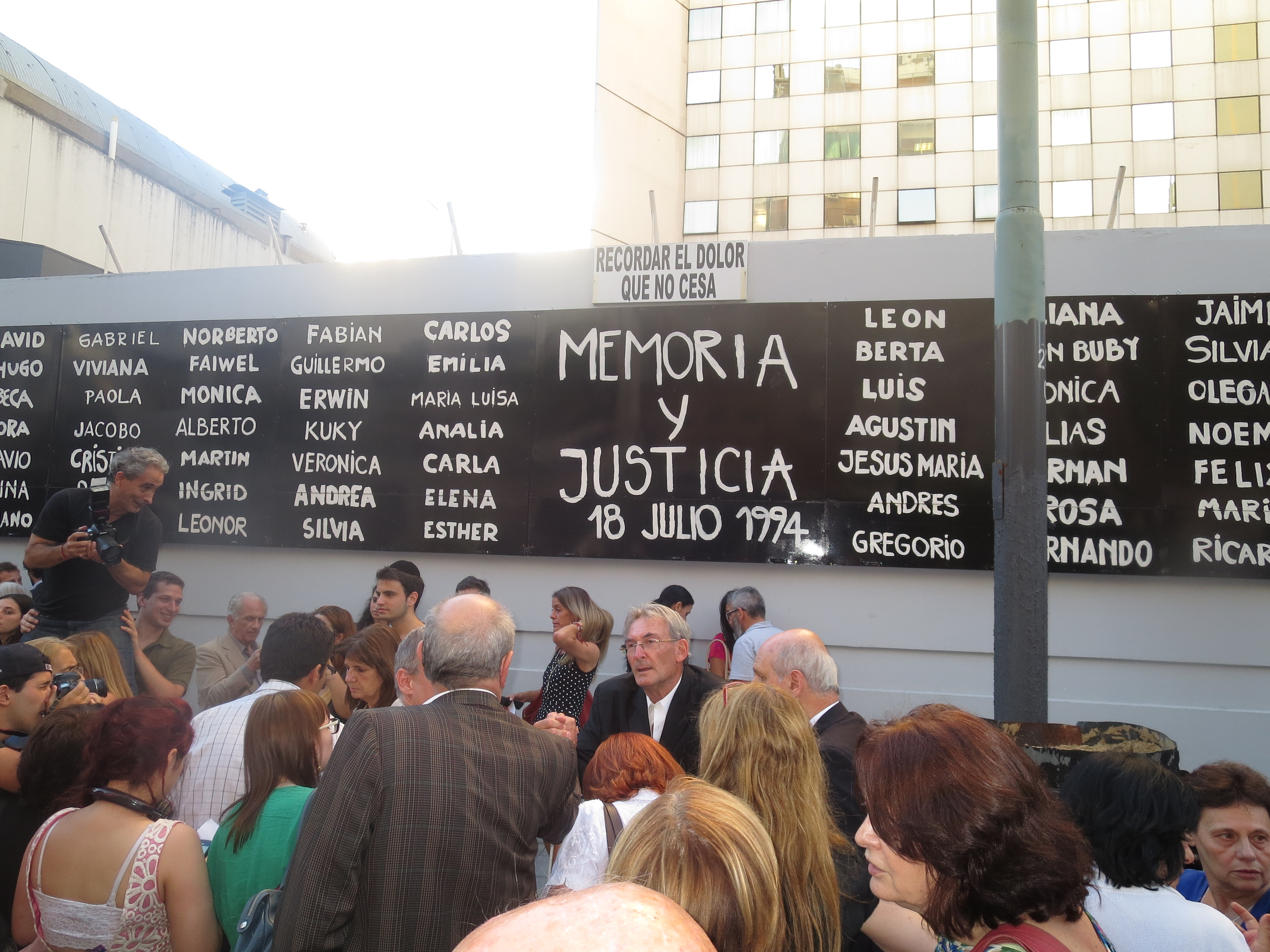
The front of the AMIA building, with the names of those who died in the bombing

On 24 May 2013, it was reported that two Iranian suspects accused of planning the AMIA bombing - Mohsen Rezaee and Ali Akbar Velayati, were candidates in the Iranian presidential elections. In May 2013, Prosecutor Alberto Nisman published a 502-page indictment accusing Iran of establishing terrorist networks throughout Latin America as early as the 1980s, including in Argentina, Brazil, Paraguay, Uruguay, Chile, Colombia, Guyana, Trinidad and Tobago, and Suriname. Nisman stated that new evidence underscored the responsibility of Mohsen Rabbani, the former Iranian cultural attache in Argentina, identifying him as the mastermind of the AMIA bombing and "coordinator of the Iranian infiltration of South America, especially in Guyana". He also cited U.S. court documents indicating that Islamist militant Abdul Kadir -sentenced to life in prison in 2010 for his role in a foiled plan to attack John F. Kennedy International Airport in New York- was a disciple of Rabbani.

The Jewish Telegraphic Agency reported that former Argentine interior minister Carlos Vladimir Corach was to be investigated for his alleged ties to the bombing. Corach was accused of authorizing an illegal payment of $400,000 to Carlos Telleldin.

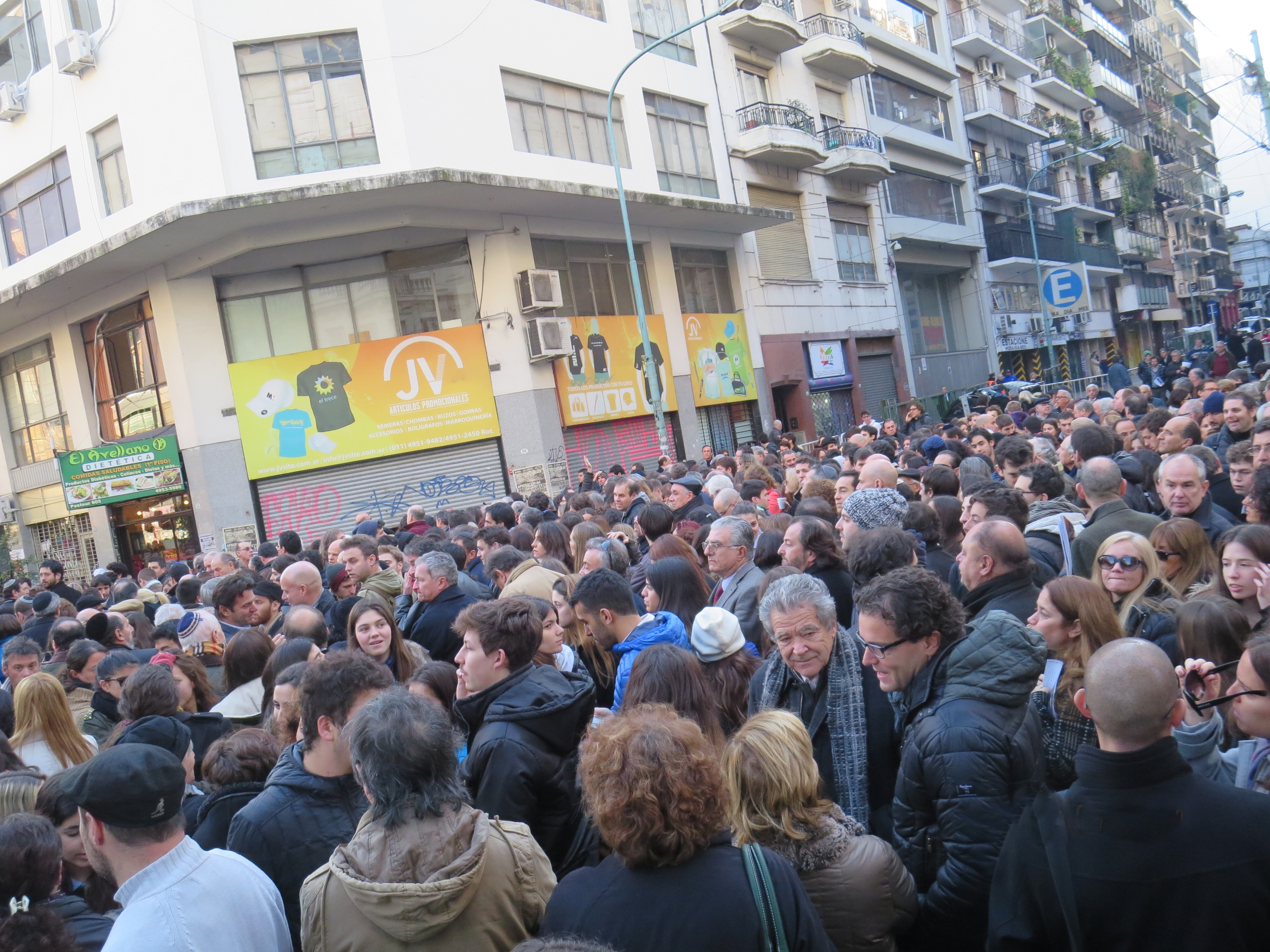
Thousands gather at an annual memorial for the bombing victims

In an interview with the Buenos Aires-based Jewish news agency Agencia Judía de Noticias on 2 January 2013, Itzhak Aviran, who served as Israeli ambassador to Argentina from 1993 to 2000, stated that most of those responsible for the AMIA attack had been eliminated by Israeli security agents operating abroad. Israeli Foreign Ministry spokesperson Yigal Palmor called Aviran's declarations "complete nonsense".

In January 2015, the prosecutor in charge of the AMIA bombing investigation, Alberto Nisman, filed a 300-page complaint accusing President Cristina Fernández de Kirchner, Foreign Minister Héctor Timerman, and other pro-government political figures of attempting to cover up Iran's alleged involvement in the attack. Nisman said his accusations were based on intercepted telephone conversations involving close political allies of Fernández, whom he alleged had conspired in a "sophisticated criminal plan" to negotiate directly with Rabbani, one of the main suspects in the bombing. According to the complaint, Iranian oil would be exchanged for Argentine grain, while Argentina would seek the cancellation of international Interpol arrest warrants against Rabbani and other senior Iranian officials. Nisman requested a preventive embargo of 200 million pesos on Fernández de Kirchner and sought to question her, along with Timerman; Andrés Larroque, a lawmaker affiliated with the pro-government group "La Cámpora"; political leader Luis D'Elía; Fernando Esteche, leader of the Quebracho movement; members of the Secretariat of Intelligence; Jorge "Yussuf" Khali, a leader of the Iranian community in Argentina, and former attorney and judge Héctor Yrimia.

On 18 January 2015, Nisman was found dead inhis home in Buenos Aires, hours before he was scheduled to present his allegations to the Argentine Congress. A firearm and a spent shell casing were found near the body. A government official stated that the death was likely a suicide, although others considered the circumstances suspicious. Judge Ariel Lijo returned immediately from vacations to overdee the case, and ordered the preservation of Nisman's evidence. Nisman was subsequently replaced by prosecutor Alberto Gentili.

In the week following Nisman's death, and despite the fact that he has been preparing to implicate her and others in a legal complaint, President Fernández de Kirchner declared her determination to replace the Argentine Intelligence Secretariat (SIDE). She argued the service had operated beyond state control for too long.

In March 2015, three former Venezuelan government officials interviewed by Veja claimed that Hugo Chávez and Mahmoud Ahmadinejad had allegedly met in 2007 to discuss payments to the Fernández de Kirchner administration. The alleged objective was to facilitate Iran's acquisition of Argentine nuclear technology and secure the cessation of Argentina's cooperation with Interpol regarding Iranian suspects. That same month, the Argentine government published full-page advertisement in national newspapers accusing the late prosecutor of attempting to destabilise the country. The advertisement further argued for the revival of a controversial memorandum with Iran, the state suspected of orchestrating the AMIA bombing. During a speech, President Fernández de Kirchner also accused Israel of responsibility for the 1992 Israeli embassy bombing in Buenos Aires, alleging that Israel only sought justice for the AMIA attack. The Israeli embassy immediately refuted this, reaffirming its demand for justice in both cases.

In December 2015, Radio Mitre, an Argentinean station, released secret tapes of Héctor Timerman, in which he admitted Iran was responsible for the bombings concurrent to negotiating with Iran. On 26 February 2016, the Argentine prosecutor Ricardo Sáenz stated Nisman's death "was a homicide indeed", claiming the case should be directed to the federal justice. On 18 July 2019, at the request of Israel and the United States, Argentina officially declared Hezbollah a terrorist organization, freezing assets and expelling all members of the organization from the country, which is held responsible for the 1994 attack against AMIA. In 2021, the Tribunal Federal Oral 8 declared the case against Cristina Fernández de Kirchner over an alleged cover-up of Iranian involvement in the bombing to be null and void; the court unanimously found no wrongdoing on Kirchner's part.

In 2023, on appeal, the Federal Chamber of Cassation revoked the dismissal that Cristina Fernández de Kirchner had benefited from and ordered her to be tried for the alleged cover-up for which Alberto Nisman accused her regarding the Argentina-Iran Memorandum of Understanding. The relatives of the victims of the AMIA attack had demanded that the oral trial against the former president be held. The reasons are that "the accused persons are attributed to the organization of a complex criminal plan to achieve or favor the impunity of the Iranian citizens suspected of having participated in the terrorist attack on the AMIA headquarters through two parallel channels, one formal - with the signing of the memorandum of understanding - and another informal, with unofficial negotiations."

On 11 April 2024, the Argentine Court of Cassation ruled based on confidential intelligence reports that Iran was responsible for planning the attack and Hezbollah for carrying it out. It stated that the attack was launched in retaliation for the Argentine government reneging on three nuclear cooperation agreements that would have provided Iran with nuclear technology, with the intent of putting pressure on Argentina to reverse its decision.

The ruling allows the families of victims to pursue Iran for compensation through the International Criminal Court by establishing that both the AMIA bombing and the 1992 Buenos Aires Israeli embassy bombing were crimes against humanity, and that states that finance and plan terror attacks can be held responsible for them even when the attack is carried out by a non-state actor. It also included a resolution calling on Argentina to lodge a formal complaint against Iran in international courts.

Following the ruling, Israel requested that Argentina designate the Islamic Revolutionary Guard Corps as a terrorist organization.

On 26 June 2025, it was reported that Argentina will try in absentia 10 suspects with Iranian and Lebanese nationalities.

- Ali Fallahian, former Iranian intelligence minister
- Ali Akbar Velayati, former Iranian foreign minister and current member of Iran's Expediency Discernment Council
- Mohsen Rezaee, former IRGC commander and current member of Iran's Expediency Discernment Council
- Hadi Soleimanpour, former Iranian ambassador to Argentina
- Ahmad Vahidi, former Quds Force commander; current IRGC commander
- Ahmad Reza Asghari, former Iranian diplomat
- Mohsen Rabbani, former Iranian embassy staffer
- Salman Raouf Salman, Hezbollah member
- Abdallah Salman, Hezbollah member
- Hussein Mounir Mouzannar, Hezbollah member

== Alleged assassinations of perpetrators ==
In January 2014, Yitzhak Aviran, who had been Israel's ambassador to Argentina at the time, claimed in an interview with a Spanish-language Jewish newspaper that most of the perpetrators of the attack had been tracked down and killed by Mossad, Israel's secret service, saying "a majority of those responsible for the act are no longer alive, and we took care of this on our own." Aviran's statements caused concern in Argentina, whose Foreign Minister, Héctor Timerman, accused Israel of having thus "prevented the gathering of new evidence that could shed light on the affair." Argentina also summoned the Israeli chargé d'affaires to ask for explanations about Aviran's statements. For its part, the Israeli government, through its own Foreign Ministry, dismissed Aviran's claims as "complete nonsense."

== Cultural depictions ==
- In 2009, Marcos Carnevale directed Anita, a full-length film which portrays a young woman (Alejandra Manzo) with Down syndrome who is lost in Buenos Aires after her mother is killed in the AMIA bombing.
- In 2025, the Israeli–Argentine–Uruguayan television series AMIA premiered. The series follows Mossad agents investigating those responsible for the attacks, blending fictional narrative with real events, including the 1992 Israeli embassy bombing.

== See also ==
- 1992 Buenos Aires Israeli embassy bombing
- History of the Jews in Argentina
- Argentina–Israel relations
- Pasteur - AMIA (Buenos Aires Underground) – station commemorating the bombing
- Iranian external operations
- Argentina–Iran relations
- Death of Alberto Nisman
