= Ahmad Reza Asghari =

Iranian diplomat

Ahmad Reza Asghari, (also spelled Hamid Reza Eshagi, and also known as Moshen Randjbaran), was an Iranian diplomat accused of organizing terrorist acts in Argentina.

Asghari was the third secretary of the Iranian embassy in Buenos Aires "until his abrupt departure from Argentina" on July 1, 1994.

In November 2006, Argentine Judge Rodolfo Canicoba Corral issued international arrest warrants for Asghari and eight other men — six other Iranians and one Lebanese — in connection to the July 18, 1994, suicide bombing of a Jewish cultural center in Buenos Aires. The AMIA bombing resulted in the murder of 85 people and serious injuries to 151. The Interpol also issued a red notice for him and other suspects for their alleged roles in the attack.

According to an Argentine government investigative report on the bombing "Mr. Asghari was one of the highest placed persons in charge of the attack, and was also responsible for activating the clandestine networks of Iranians in Argentina".

The report stated that Asghari was present at an August 14, 1993, meeting with former Iranian President Akbar Hashemi Rafsanjani and his top deputies in the Iranian city of Mashad where the decision was made to commit the terrorist attack.

Prior to his posting in Argentina, Asghari "had served in Iran's renowned Revolutionary Guard", according to the Argentine investigative report.

Asghari's "name surfaced as a delegate to a 2002 U.N. conference in Geneva, where he was listed as the Iranian foreign ministry's first secretary in the department for international economic affairs", according to Brett Stephens, an editorial columnist at The Wall Street Journal.
