= Elham Asghari =

Iranian swimmer

Personal information
- Born: 1981 (age 44–45)

Sport
- Sport: Swimming
- Strokes: Long-distance swimming

Elham Sadat Asghari (Persian: الهام اصغری; born 1981) is an Iranian swimmer who claimed that she has set an as-yet-unrecognized 20 kilometers swimming record in the Caspian Sea in northern Iran in June 2013.

== Early life and background ==
Elham began swimming at the age of five and started to teach swimming at the age of 17. Asghari's childhood dream was to swim in open waters, and to achieve her goal she looked for training programmes on the internet. Asghari's father worked as a wrestler, and encouraged her to register her records.

In Iran Islamic Sharia law is applied. The Islamic dress code imposes that women are required to cover their hair and body regardless of their religion and nationality. Moreover, female athletes in Iran are expected to practice separately from men; for swimmers this means swimming in women-only pools or in their own times. The only competition in which Iranian women swimmers take part are the Women's Islamic Games, as they cannot go to competitions abroad so they would not be seen by men while wearing swimsuits. To comply to the Sharia, Asghari came up with a special Hijab swimsuit that covered her body from head to toe, which in water adds 6 kilograms to the swimmer's weight.

== Career ==
In 2008, the Iranian ministry of sports recognized Asghari's 12-kilometer swim for her usage of the full-body swimming outfit.

=== 2010: Accident ===
Asghari's problems with her performances began in 2010, when she decided to swim around Kish Island in three days, overseen by a representative from the ministry of sports. When Asghari had only swum 5 kilometres, police boats rammed into her and people around. She injured a leg and had her hip was lacerated by boat propellers.

The trauma made Asghari decide to stop swimming. However her family and friends encouraged her to return. After undergoing therapy, Asghari began to practice again, swimming 5 kilometres every night and running 12 kilometres daily.

=== 2013 ===
On June 11, 2013, Asghari swam 20 kilometres going back and forth for 8 hours from 5:30 am to 2:30 pm in the Caspian Sea near Nowshahr. The area was a private, women-only beach to avoid any potential run-ins with police boats. The representative from Iran's sports ministry tried to knock her distance down to 15 kilometres, after Asghari protested they accepted 18 kilometres, only to afterward refusing to approve her record saying that the feminine features of her body were visible when she came out of water. One of the representative of the federation said: "The deputy sports minister told him that her costume wasn't suitable for free water swimming." One of Asghari's friends declared that the swimsuit was the same of the 2008 record. Shahrnaz Vernoos, adviser for women's affairs in the federation, said on a family website: "There was no representative [of the federation] and it is unclear if she really swam 18 kilometres, female free swimming is contrary to the rules of the ministry of sports and youth, for three years there has been no competition." Reza Habibi, a member of the federation's technical committee, said: "There are no records recognised in free water swimming, what she has done is a personal act without coordinating with the federation and the ministry." He also added that the international federation only acknowledges swims of "5, 10, 15 and 25 kilometres."

== Guinness world records set ==
She has surpassed records previously owned by male competitors, accomplishing the fastest 10 km swim (one arm) in open water within 4 hours and 58 minutes. Additionally, she established a new benchmark by swimming the farthest distance while wearing handcuffs, achieving this remarkable feat twice and currently securing the record in this particular category. Her most recent accomplishment is setting the record for the fastest 5 km swim while pulling a canoe/kayak, completing it in an impressive time of 1 hour, 58 minutes, and 40 seconds.

== Support ==
Asghari posted a video of herself online with the help of her manager, Farvartish Rezvaniyeh, who decided to help her to publish her plight. When Rezvaniyeh heard about Asghari's case on Facebook he contacted her and made her make the video. Asghari gained the support of thousands of fans on Facebook and tributes poured as more people became aware of the case. In her video Asghari promises that women will not have to wear such dampening swimsuits.

== See also ==
- Gender segregation and Islam
- Intimate parts in Islam
- Women's rights in Iran
- Sex segregation in Iran

== Bibliography ==
- Report on Borna News
- Report on Magiran
- Report on Parsine
- Report on Isna
- Report on Nasim Online
