= Delegación de Asociaciones Israelitas Argentinas =

Jewish umbrella organization in Argentina

- Abbreviation: DAIA
- Location: Buenos Aires, Argentina
- President: Jorge Knoblovits
- Vice president 1°: David Stalman
- Website: www.daia.org.ar

The Delegación de Asociaciones Israelitas Argentinas (DAIA) is the umbrella organization of Argentina's Jewish community. As such, it represents the community in official events and conducts all contact with authorities. The DAIA is the Argentine affiliate of the Latin American Jewish Congress and World Jewish Congress, the world-wide umbrella organization of Jewish communities.

During the Cold War, the organization expelled Jewish communist groups from its umbrella.

In 2007, the group reported that antisemitic attacks in Argentina increased by 32% in 2006 in comparison to 2005.

In 2011 the group filed an injunction to stop Google from advertising on 76 "highly discriminatory" websites. The DAIA noted, "The common denominator on these sites is the incitement of hate and the call to violence". The judge agreed, concluding that "the terms mentioned [in the lawsuit] as well as the results obtained through 'suggested searches' could be described as discriminatory acts and/or at least, incitement and/or encouragement for discrimination".

== See also ==
- World Jewish Congress
