= Asociación Mutual Israelita Argentina =

Jewish Community Centre in Buenos Aires, Argentina

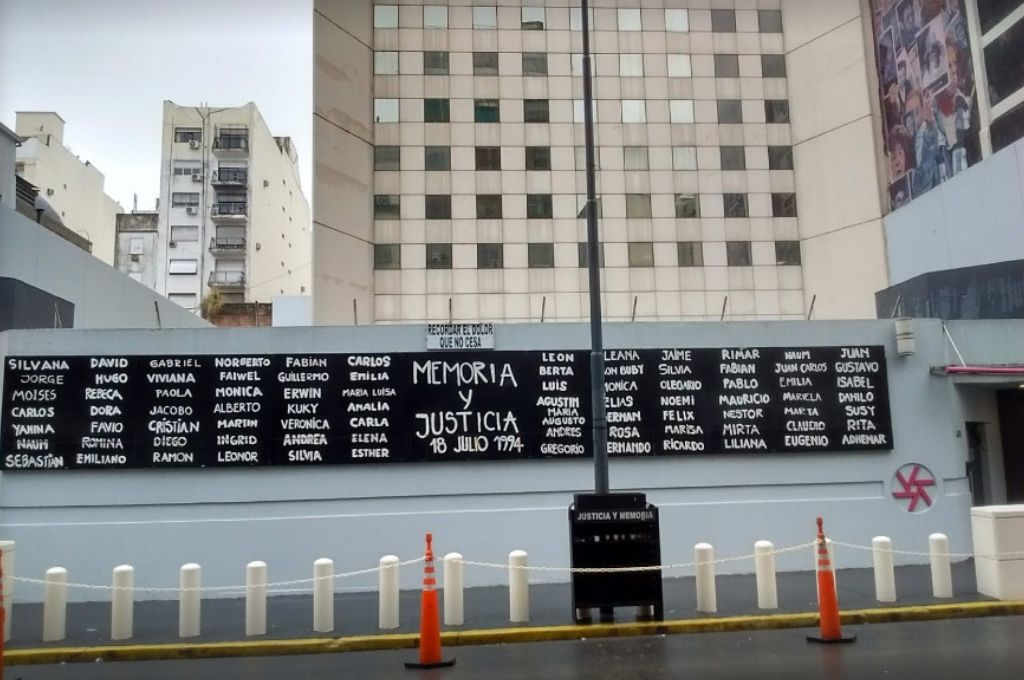
- Main building of the AMIA, 2012

- Abbreviation: AMIA
- Formation: 1894
- Founded at: Buenos Aires
- Coordinates: 34°36′06.5″S 58°23′58″W
- President: Ariel Eichbaum
- Affiliations: Judaism
- Website: www.amia.org.ar

Asociación Mutual Israelita Argentina (AMIA; transl. "Argentine Israelite Mutual Association") is a Jewish Community Centre located in Buenos Aires, Argentina.

Established as Jevrá Kedushá in 1894, its mission was conceived to promote the well-being and development of Jewish life in Argentina and to secure the continuity and values of the Jewish community. The association established one of Buenos Aires' first Jewish cemeteries, and later founded the Tsedaká Foundation for charity. Serving the largest Jewish community in Latin America by the 1920s, AMIA inaugurated a new headquarters in Balvanera, a neighbourhood of Buenos Aires, in 1945; AMIA also became the headquarters of the Federation of Jewish Argentine Communities. It grew to provide and sponsor a variety of formal and informal educational, recreational, and cultural activities, as well as a healthcare cooperative. It became a centre for participation and involvement for people of all ages in Jewish life, and in the community at large.

It has an employment agency service that provides connections between employers with potential employees as well as providing training and resources directed to both Jewish and non-Jewish people, with more than 500,000 applicants in its database.

The AMIA also maintains the largest Jewish cemetery in Latin America, La Tablada Israelite Cemetery, established in 1936.

== 1994 AMIA bombing ==
On 18 July 1994 (10th of Av on the Hebrew calendar), a Renault Trafic loaded with 300 kilograms (660 lb) of explosives was driven into the AMIA building and detonated, killing 85 people (67 in the building itself and 18 who were on the sidewalk and in a neighbouring building), and injuring over 300. Following the attack, a series of federal and international investigations were launched; though the case remains unresolved, high-ranking members of the government of Iran were indicted, and in 2007, the general assembly of Interpol issued red notices for five Iranian officials. An 8,000-square-metre (86,000 sq ft) centre was later commissioned to replace the destroyed AMIA structure, and in May 1999, the new building, a modernist 8-story structure separated from the street by a protective wall, was inaugurated.

== Alternative names ==
Other English-language names for the organization are: Argentine Jewish Mutual Aid Society, Argentine Israelite Mutual Aid Association (or Argentine Israelite Mutual Association), Argentine Jewish Mutual Aid Association, and Jewish Mutual Association of Argentina.
