= 1992 Buenos Aires Israeli embassy bombing =

Suicide bombing in Argentina

Attack on the Israeli embassy in Buenos Aires
- Part of Spillover of the South Lebanon conflict (1985–2000)
- Location: 34°35′30″S 58°22′49″W; Buenos Aires, Argentina
- Date: 17 March 1992; 14:42 (UTC−3)
- Target: Israeli embassy
- Attack type: Suicide bombing
- Deaths: 29 victims (4 Israeli civilians and 25 Argentine civilians) and the suicide bomber
- Injuries: 242 civilians
- Perpetrators: Islamic Jihad Organization claimed responsibility Hezbollah operative Imad Mughniyah charged by Argentina; Hezbollah operative Amer Mohamed Akil Rada

The attack on the Israeli embassy in Buenos Aires was a suicide bombing attack on the building of the Israeli embassy of Argentina, located in Buenos Aires, which was carried out on 17 March 1992. 29 civilians were killed in the attack and 242 additional civilians were injured.

== The attack ==
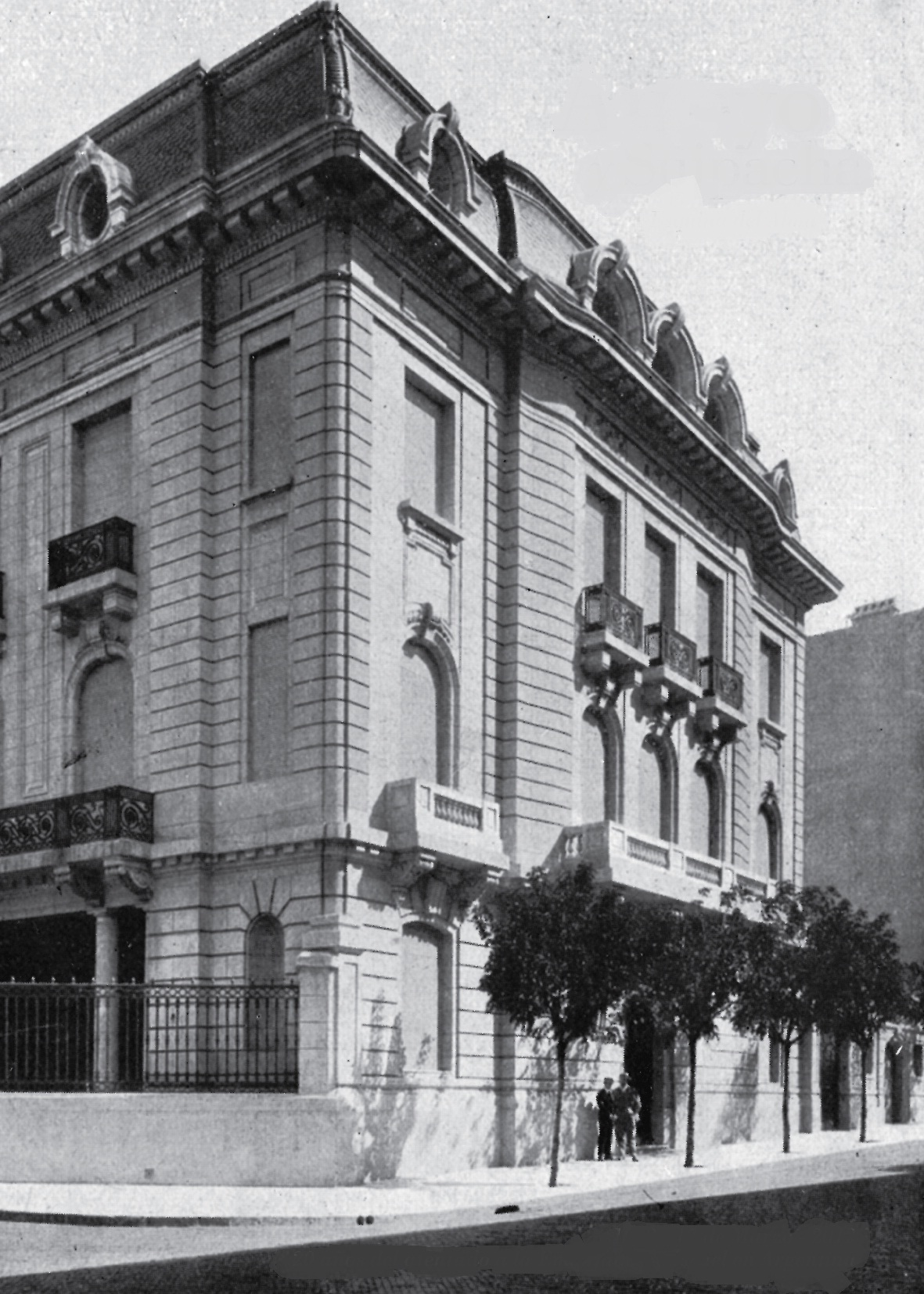
Former Israeli Embassy before the attack.

On 17 March 1992, at 2:42 pm (UTC−3), a pick-up truck driven by a suicide bomber and loaded with explosives smashed into the front of the Israeli Embassy located on the corner of Arroyo and Suipacha and detonated. The embassy, a Catholic church, and a nearby school building were destroyed. Four Israelis died, but most of the victims were Argentine civilians, many of them children. The blast killed 29 and wounded 242. It was Argentina's deadliest terror attack until the 1994 AMIA bombing and it remains the deadliest attack on an Israeli diplomatic mission.

== Fatalities ==
Priest Juan Carlos Brumana was one of the people killed in the suicide bombing. He died in the Catholic Church Mater Admirabilis that is in front of the embassy. Among the dead there were two Israeli women who were the wives of the embassy's consul and first secretary.

== Responsibility ==
A group called Islamic Jihad Organization, which has been linked to Iran and possibly Hezbollah, claimed responsibility; their stated motive for the attack was Israel's assassination of Hezbollah Secretary-General Sayed Abbas al-Musawi several months earlier in February 1992. Islamic Jihad also released surveillance footage they took of the embassy before the blast.

After the bombing, Israel sent investigators to Argentina. They found that the bombers planned the attack in the Tri-Border area, where Argentina, Paraguay, and Brazil meet and which has a large Muslim population.

In May 1998, Moshen Rabbani, the Cultural Attaché in the Iranian Embassy in Argentina until December 1997, was detained in Germany, and the Argentine government expelled seven Iranian diplomats from the country, stating that it had "convincing proof" of Iranian involvement in the bombing. However, none of the suspects were prosecuted. The attack occurred when Iran and Argentina were hoping for a resumption of nuclear cooperation, although Argentina had announced the suspension of the shipments of nuclear materials to Iran a couple months before the bombing. A number of sources report on Hezbollah involvement with the assistance of Syria. Hezbollah denies these claims.

In 1999, the Argentine government issued an arrest warrant for Hezbollah operative Imad Mughniyah in connection with the 1992 attack and the 1994 AMIA bombing in Buenos Aires, which killed 85 people.

In 2023, the United States sanctioned Hezbollah operative Amer Mohamed Akil Rada, who was active in Latin America for over a decade, for his reported role in this attack and the 1994 AMIA bombing.

In April 2024, Argentina's second highest court ruled that the Iranian government was responsible for the bombing, and that it was carried out in retaliation for Argentina reneging on agreements to transfer nuclear material to Iran. The ruling also characterized Iran as a terrorist state.

== Aftermath ==
=== Kirchner on the case ===
When he was president, Néstor Kirchner pronounced that allowing these two incidents to happen, with no real inquiries to be followed, equalled a "national disgrace". He reopened, and kept open files from these incidents, most to be read by Justice Juan Jose Galeano. In the same process Kirchner hoped to lift the ban for former Intelligence Officers (Argentine) to testify. A former president of Argentina (his widow, Cristina Fernández de Kirchner) also claimed that she wanted to get to the bottom of the case. Argentinian federal prosecutor, Alberto Nisman, was assigned to investigate the bombing, but one day before he was scheduled to report on his findings, he was found dead in his home on 18 January 2015.

=== Commemoration ===
Today there is a memorial set up in place of where the building stood. In the memorial plaza stand twenty one trees and seven benches in memory of the victims. A plaque describing the event and listing the victims is located in the memorial in both Hebrew and Spanish.

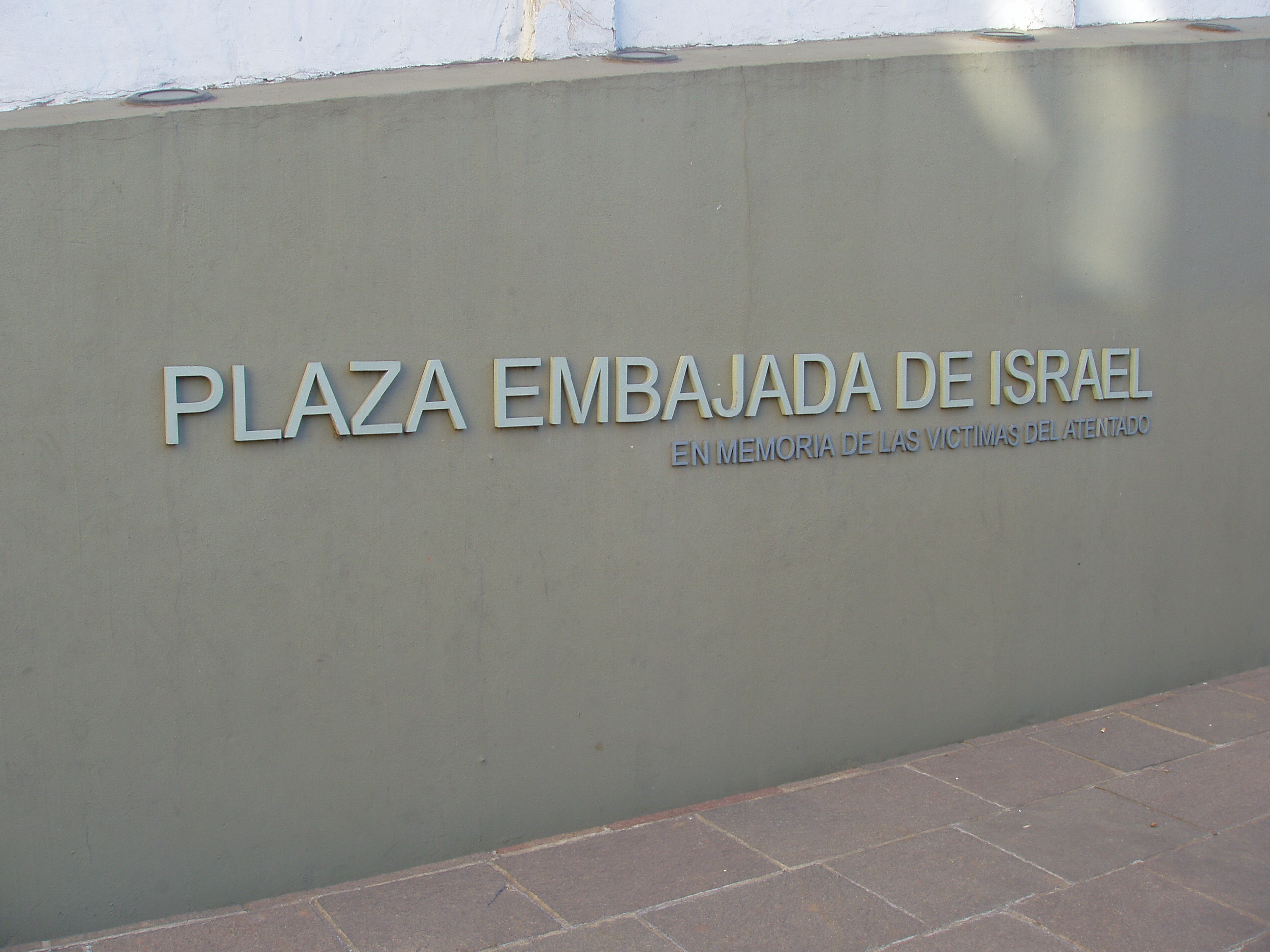
The memorial to the victims of the bombing

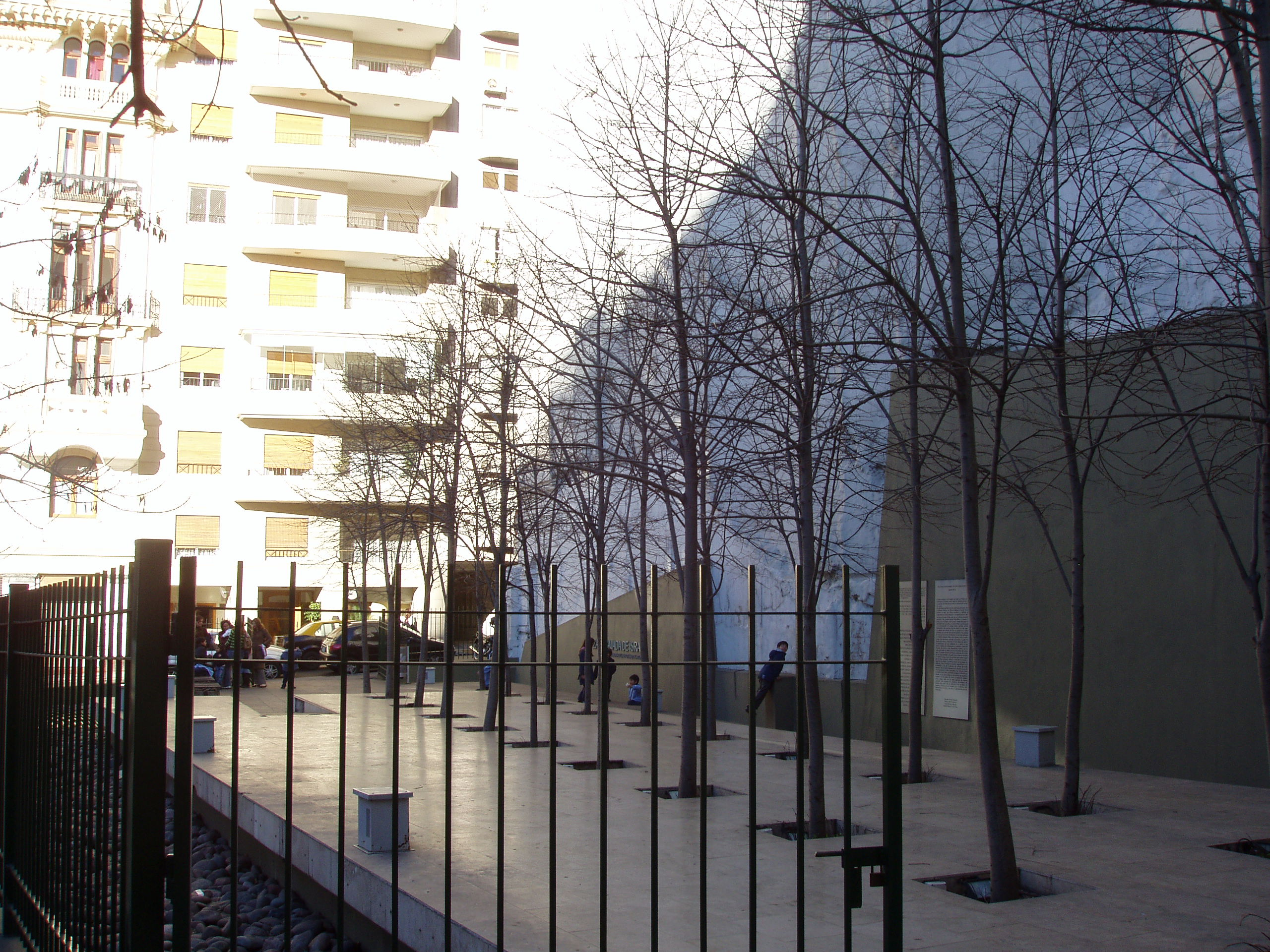
The memorial to the victims of the bombing

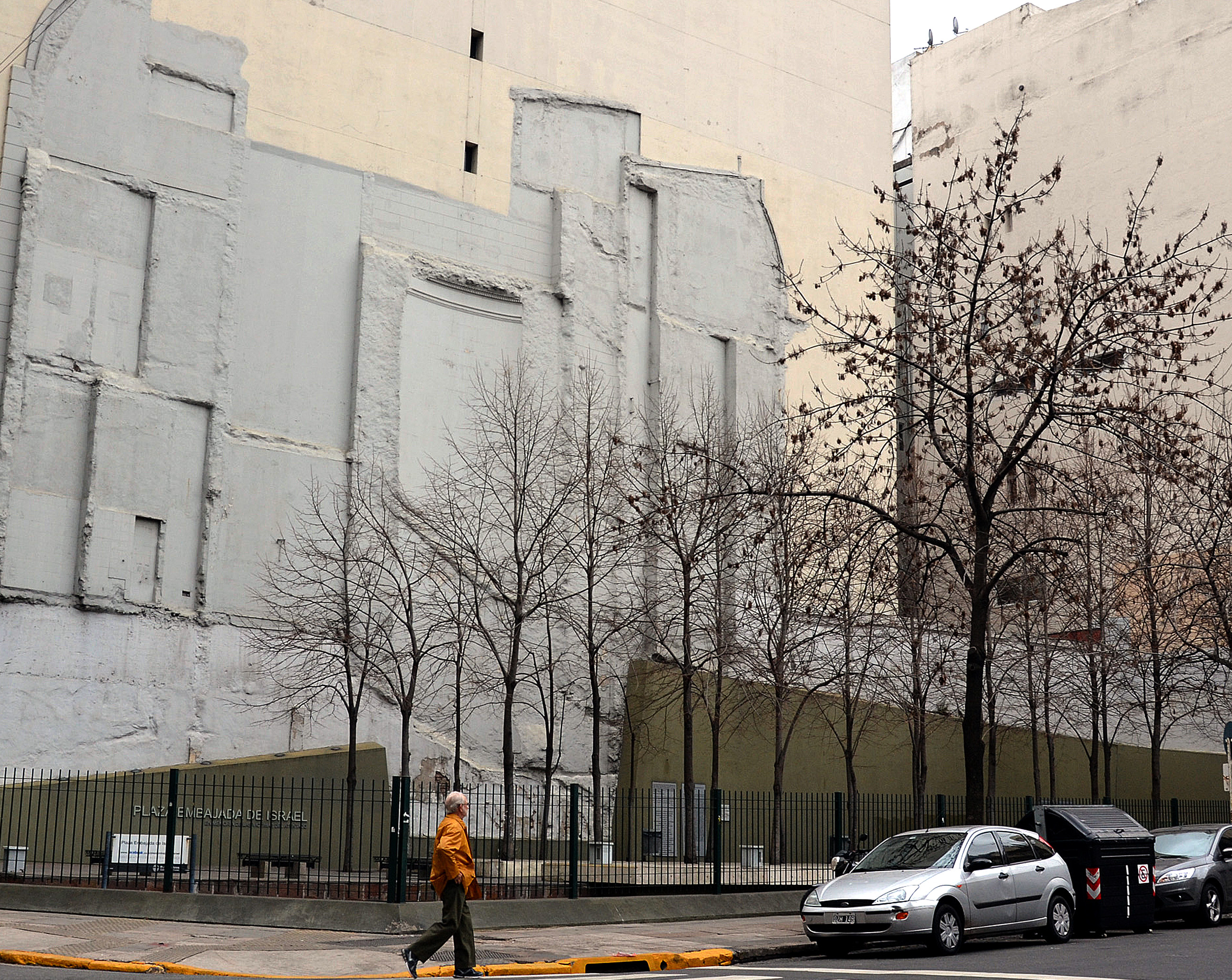
The memorial to the victims of the bombing

== See also ==
- 1994 London Israeli Embassy bombing
- Alas Chiricanas Flight 901, the bombing of a Panamanian plane, whose casualties included 12 Jews, the day after the AMIA bombing, suspected to have been carried out by Hezbollah
- Argentina–Israel relations
- History of the Jews in Argentina
- List of unsolved murders (1980–1999)
- Secretariat of Intelligence
- Terrorism in Argentina
- 2026 attack on Israeli consulate in Turkey
