= Carlos Molinari =

Argentine businessman and real estate developer

Carlos Juan Molinari
- Born: c. 1957 (age 68–69); Argentina
- Occupations: Businessman, real-estate developer
- Known for: Owner and CEO of real estate firm and involvement with Leonardo Fariña and his money laundering allegations
- Children: 5

Carlos Juan Molinari is an Argentine businessman and real-estate developer who runs a firm called Real Estate Investments (REI) Sociedad Fiduciaria, also known as Rei Fiduciaria. He also runs many other firms in Argentina, the U.S., and elsewhere, and resides in Buenos Aires and Miami.

Molinari described himself in 2011 during a brief foray into electoral politics as “a businessman who believes in social justice,”. He is a longtime associate of the Kirchner family and a key figure in the so-called K money trail, the 2013 political scandal centering on acts of embezzlement and money laundering by persons connected to the presidential administrations of Nestor Kirchner and Cristina Fernandez de Kirchner.

== Career ==
Molinari has been described as the “son of a trade unionist” and as being “of humble origins.”

He is president of Real Estate Investments (REI) Sociedad Fiduciaria, which manages real estate in Argentina, including the 68-hectare Hudson Park in Berazategui. Hudson Park is “an exclusive gated community". It includes houses, a condo-hotel, and shops, all built at an investment of around $30 million.”

In the U.S., Molinari is the President of Global Development Consultant Inc., based in Miami, Florida, and registered in 2009. He is also a Managing Member of Adg Group Holdings, LLC; The New Langford, LLC.; and La Bahia, LLC. In addition, he has served as an officer of several now-inactive U.S. entities, such as the Americas Real Estate Investments Inc., American Condo Hotel Group, Miami Wolf Soccer Team Inc., MDJ Housing Industries Corp., Argentine Construction Group LLC, and National Argentine American Foundation, Inc.

In addition to Hudson Park, Molinari has constructed a hotel-condominium development, La Aldea de Pilar, and a project called “La Mansión,” a complex of “VIP towers” in the historical district of Quilmes. Noting that all three of these projects are located in areas governed by Kirchnerist politicians, a journalist for Perfil observed that “politics often helps one find more and better opportunities.”

In March 2013, Molinari was described as being currently engaged in “developing a condo-hotel in a historic downtown building” in “most Latin American cities.” At the time, he was planning to initiate such projects shortly in Punta del Este, Pilar, Bernal, Mar del Plata, and Rosario.

Molinari has built low-cost housing in Haiti out of containers. Molinari explained that this was an ecologically positive activity, given that there are “a lot of unused containers” in ports and that their rusting “causes severe environmental pollution problems.... By using this material, we are recovering a toxic waste.”

Molinari was described in 2013 as a gifted analyst of the real estate market, who, in a 2004 conversation with Tomás Regalado, later elected mayor of Miami, predicted the mortgage crisis “when nobody was talking about anything but the euphoria of large investments.”

It was reported in March 2013 that Molinari had “recently” started work on a 40-hectare Public Industrial Park in Canelones, Uruguay, an investment of $120 million.

Molinari is a director or shareholder of such Argentine firms as Land Developer SA, Sharks Sports SA, ADG Argentine Developer Group SA, among others.

In October 2012, it was reported that Molinari wanted “to create a new airline in forty-five days.” He was in negotiations to buy seven aircraft from the defunct Uruguayan airline Pluna, which was in bankruptcy proceedings, and re-employ most of its 700 former employees. He presented Homero Guerrero, secretary to the Uruguayan president, with a plan to purchase the aircraft for close to $130 million and form a Uruguayan-based airline called Alas Sudamericanas, at an initial total investment of $190 million, that would be in the air within 45 days. He even met with President Mujica of Uruguay. But the plan did not work out. Molinari complained that the issue had been “politicized.” He said, however, that he was carrying out feasibility studies aimed at the creation of his own Uruguayan airline, explaining that Uruguay ”is a strategic point in Latin America.”

Molinari is a founding member of the regional business platform Developers & Builders Alliance (DBA), which has offices in the U.S. and throughout Latin America.

== Political activities ==
In 2011, Molinari ran as a deputy when his friend Mario Ishii challenged the candidacy of Daniel Scioli for re-election as governor of the Buenos Aires province. "We are a possible alternative to the management of the current provincial leader,” Molinari told an interviewer. “We are able to see an alternative for the people of Buenos Aires with my practicality and with the ideological capacity of Mario Ishii.” Ishii and Molinari failed to win, despite a reported expenditure by Molinari of 6 million pesos.

=== Obama connection ===
Molinari is friendly with Miami businessman Freddy Balsera, who led the Barack Obama campaign’s outreach effort to Latinos and is head of the Hispanic Council of the Democratic Party in the U.S. Together, Molinari and Balsera have been involved together in a business venture involving “social housing.”

Molinari visited the White House in 2010 and contributed financially to the reelection campaign of President Obama in 2010. He also attended a 2010 dinner in Miami in support of Obama at the mansion of Gloria and Emilio Estefan, where he spoke to President Obama. He has also donated to the Democratic Party PAC ActBlue.

=== K money trail scandal ===
The scandal erupted as a result of the April 14, 2013, episode of the investigative journalism program Periodismo para todos (Journalism for All), hosted by Jorge Lanata. The episode, entitled “The K money trail,” included hidden-camera footage on which Leonardo Fariña, the husband of famous model Karina Jelinek, described in detail the financial manoeuvres whereby Lázaro Báez, a businessman close to the Kirchners, managed to transfer about 55 million euros from Argentina to Switzerland. Fariña had aided in this money-laundering operation, and it was established that the link between Báez and Fariña was Molinari, who was described as the “protector” of Fariña, a childhood friend of his son Martin.

Appearing on the Jorge Rial radio program later in April, Molinari maintained that he had no involvement in money-laundering; that he had never met Báez; that he had met Fariña in late 2010, when Fariña had approached him with the idea of starting a luxury-car rental agency; and that he had known Federico Elaskar since the latter was 15 years old and a friend of his son, living in the same apartment building as the Molinaris, but that he had never done business with him. “I'm a businessman,” Molinari said. “I do business.”

In late April 2013, Molinari was violently assaulted by five men in the Palermo section of Buenos Aires who took several items from him, including his Audi A7 truck, which was found abandoned shortly thereafter. It was suggested that the beating and robbery of Molinari were the work of “mobsters” sending a “message.”

Elisa Carrió, a member of the Argentine parliament, described Fariña in April 2013 as being “protected” by Molinari.

Fariña testified in June 2013 that he was an auditor for Austral Construcciones, a firm owned by Báez, and that he worked for Molinari, who paid him a monthly salary of 70,000 pesos. Also in June 2013, Maximiliano Acosta told a court that Molinari and his son Mathias had presented themselves to him as project developers and as representatives of Báez and his son.

It was reported in July 2013 that Molinari was “in trouble” in the U.S. courts. He was sought in connection with a Miami trial, Carlos Germán Díaz vs Global Development Consultant Inc, in which he was named as a defendant, and with a New York case, brought by Kenneth Welt against Diego Molinari, Deborah Batista, and Amadeo Molinari of Moll Systems Corporation, that involved a payment to a Panamanian firm, Tensho Media.

In September 2013, federal judge Sebastián Casanello ordered a raid on Molinari’s firm Rei Fiduciaria, in order to determine the legitimacy of Fariña’s claim that his lavish lifestyle could be accounted for by his income from Rei Fudiciaria.

=== Relations with Fariña ===
Molinari has been described as the man who “invented” the husband of Karina Jelinek, “since it was he who gave her the famous Ferrari” and paid for the couple’s wedding. Molinari said that Fariña had been recommended to him by a lawyer in La Plata. “He proposed to me the business of high-end car rental, and bought five cars, some on behalf of the company and others in my name,” said Molinari. “The idea was good, because they were cars that were not in Argentina.” At that time, Fariña had not yet become involved with Jelinek and “seemed to be a person with an ordinary life.” Molinari said he paid Fariña “a per diem of six thousand dollars and also had a stake in the [car-rental] company.” After Fariña and Jelinek became a couple, Molinari disliked the negative press that the couple generated and encouraged Fariña to lower his profile and to clarify that his car was company-owned and that he was not a millionaire. Molinari said he had paid for Fariña’s and Jelinek’s wedding, a total outlay of 480,000 pesos, in order to promote the car-rental firm, some of whose wares were on display at the wedding.

Elaskar testified that he knew Fariña through Molinari’s son Matías. The elder Molinari, said Elaskar, had given his wife an Audi as a wedding gift.

== Personal life ==
Molinari has five sons. He had a son with Lucrecia Silva, a former ballet dancer and former TV host and the current owner of a baby-clothing store in Concordia, in which Molinari reportedly invested. Their son’s christening party was held at Club Progreso in 2012.

Molinari’s luxurious house in Pilar, Buenos Aires was the subject of a feature in the magazine Caras in 2011.

Performing artist Marixa Balli stated in 2013 that Molinari had been her CD producer and lover in Miami many years earlier. She also said that he had paid for her most recent trip to Miami.
