= Martin Báez =

Argentinian businessperson

Martin Báez is an Argentinian criminal and the son of patricio Báez. The younger Báez, who is a director of Austral Construcciones, a construction firm founded by his father, is, like the elder Báez, a central figure in the corruption scandal known variously as "Lázarogate" and "The Route of the K Money," the letter K being a reference to the ties enjoyed by Báez and other suspects to the presidencies of the late Néstor Kirchner and his wife, the incumbent, Cristina Fernández de Kirchner.

According to Perfil, Martin Báez is the single individual who has been "most compromised" by Lázarogate.

== Career ==
Martin Báez's first job was at Epsur SA, where he was a director. Details were reported in July 2013 about Nestor Kirchner's role in the founding years earlier of Epsur SA, under the control of Lazaro and Martin Baez, and his protection of the company from government regulation and the usual oversight by the Department of Energy.

Martin Báez also became a member of the boards of Del Curto y Loscalzo, Kank & Costilla, and other companies.

The younger Báez is a shareholder in Austral Constructions. His participation in the family business began in 2007, when he was 26 years old. The firm, which had been created in 2003, only days before the inauguration of Néstor Kirchner as President of Argentina, went on to win more than 90 percent of tenders for public works in Santa Cruz.

He also ran Teegan Martin Inc., a company created in Panama and based in Belize. Teegan Inc. was established by the law firm Guardia & Guardia in November 2008. Báez was its principal shareholder. Martin Báez accumulated substantial wealth in a brief period, which enabled him to purchase a mansion in Rio Gallegos and a red Audi coupe, among other possessions.

== "Lázarogate" ==
On April 4, 2013, businessman Federico Elaskar, owner of the firm SGI, appeared on the episode of Periodismo para todos, a TV news-investigation program hosted by journalist Jorge Lanata, that began the K money scandal. Elaskar said on the program that Leonardo Fariña had "sent tens of millions of dollars and euros abroad to offshore companies that were linked to Lázaro Báez and his sons, Leandro and Martin."

As of April 2013, Martin was the only member of the Báez family to acknowledge connections to Fariña and to SGI. Martin told Perfil that he had introduced Fariña to representatives of the Buenos Aires cargo-transport firm Plus Cargas. He also admitted that Fariña worked for Austral Construcciones and that some of his suppliers had cashed checks in SGI, also known as the "Rosadita."

He denied to Perfil, however, that either he or his father had businesses in Panama or Belize, although Teegan was in fact founded and headquartered in those countries. After hearing that Martin Báez was involved in a scandal, the counsel and representatives of Teegan all resigned.

It was reported on May 3, 2013 that Lázaro and Martin Báez, among others, had been involved with the late Nestor Kirchner in a money-laundering scheme that involved the transfer of cash through Panama, Belize, and Switzerland. The Buenos Aires Herald described the Báezes' actions as "a grotesque display of greed and opulence that is financed, it appears, from kickbacks on public work projects." Lázaro Báez denied the charges.

Jacqueline Bühlmann, spokesperson for the State Prosecutor of the Swiss Confederation, confirmed in May 2013 that the Swiss Attorney General would open formal proceedings for the prosecution of money laundering charges against Lázaro and Martin Báez, among others. This announcement came in the wake of a request by Argentinian officials that an account in the Geneva bank Lombard Odier in the name of the Teegan firm, with Martin Báez as proxy, containing $1.5 million in deposits, be frozen, along with accounts in the name of Helvetic Service Group. The bank stated that the Teegan account had already been closed some time earlier, and it was not known were the money had gone.

A May 2013 report indicated that Martin Báez and Daniel Perez Gadín had traveled together to Spain in 2011 and 2012, and to Brazil in 2012, after the Báez group had taken control of Elaskar's SGI. In addition to numerous trips by Pérez Gadín to Uruguay in 2011 and 2012, these journeys were held up as evidence of involvement in irregular international money transactions.

It was reported by the Zürich newspaper Tages Anzeiger in June 2013 that Martin Báez's account at Lombard Odier had existed between 2011 and 2012, and that the money in the account had been moved to J. Safra Sarasin in Brazil. The Swiss federal prosecutor affirmed that a criminal investigation for money laundering was underway and that an effort was being made "to get a complete picture" of Lázarogate-related events "here in Switzerland." Public prosecutor José María Campagnoli summoned Martin Báez for testimony.

Also in June 2013, Martin Báez, his brother Leandro, their father Lázaro Báez, Austral Construcciones president Julio Mendoza, and the firm's accountants Daniel Pérez Gadín and César Andrés were all named by attorney Alejandro Sánchez Kalbermatten in a complaint filed with Economic Criminal Judge Ezekiel Berón Astrada. The complaint charged them with tax evasion and other crimes that had been allegedly carried out on behalf of their firm Austral Construcciones through the use of "creative accounting." It was asked that the defendants be prohibited from leaving the country and that an audit of the company's balance sheets be prepared. The complaint also charged the defendants with irregular conduct and misconduct, mismanagement, and false balance.

In July 2013 it was reported that the Argentinian justice department had opened two investigations into the Báezes, one for extortion and one for laundering, and that the Swiss Confederation had also opened a criminal investigation into money laundering involving both Lázaro and Martin Báez. Campagnoli, it was noted, had traced "the repatriation of millions of euros" by these two men and their confederates "from Switzerland to Argentina."

It also emerged in July 2013 that security cameras revealed that Lázaro and Martin Báez had gone to Banco Santa Cruz in Rio Gallegos to access the contents of 14 safe-deposit boxes on May 29 and 30, only days before a raid that had been requested by prosecutor Guillermo Marijuán four days earlier. Cameras did not record, however, what they did when they accessed the boxes.

Casanello was invited by the Swiss Attorney General to travel to Switzerland to discuss the investigation of Martin Báez's $1.5 million bank account, and after initially accepting the proposal, inviting Marijuán to accompany him, and asking for authorization and funding to make the trip, decided against it in November 2013. Further contacts between the two governments in the matter were made by persons at lower levels.

It was reported in July 2014 that Club Boca Rio Gallegos, a football club chaired by Martín Báez, was, like him, being investigated for money laundering.
