= Federico Elaskar =

Argentine businessman

Federico Elaskar is an Argentine businessman who has been implicated in a web of financial-corruption scandals, known as Lázarogate, surrounding the administrations of that nation's last president, Cristina Fernández de Kirchner, and of her late husband and predecessor, Nestor Kirchner, and centering on the Kirchernite businessman Lázaro Báez.

By 2010, when he was in his mid-20s, Elaskar had already been a principal in several international firms and had accumulated considerable personal wealth. In an April 2013 television interview, he described at length his role in an international scheme to launder money for Báez and other leading figures in the Kirchner circle. After the interview, however, he claimed that he had been lying. One report stated that Elaskar was “perhaps the key piece” in the entire history of corruption involving persons connected to the Kirchner government.

In 2020, Federico Elaskar said that the head of the Financial Information Unit during the government of Mauricio Macri, Mariano Federici, offered "a safe-conduct to the United States" to escape "via Uruguay" in exchange for declaring as repentant accusing the former President Cristina Fernández de Kirchner.

== Career ==
Elaskar was an employee of Droguería Vademécum S.A., whose president was Marcelo Emilio Elaskar and whose director was Paris Elaskar. He then became deputy director of ATC Argentine Trust Company SA and worked for the advertising company Latin Minds SRL.

Elaskar began his work in finance in 2009 as director and CEO of Vanquish Capital Group S.A., a firm that was involved in financial services, international commerce, and real estate transactions. Elaskar formed the firm on May 28, 2009, at age 24, with a start-up capital amounting to 200,000 pesos.

From Vanquish, according to an April 21, 2013, investigative report by Clarín, Elaskar went to the firm SGI, commonly referred to as “La Rosadita.” The firm's various names and its existence in multiple countries have caused some confusion regarding its exact origins and the precise nature of Elaskar's relationship to it. Clarín reported that a firm called SGI Ventures LLC, with offices in Miami, Buenos Aires, and Mendoza, Argentina, was registered in Miami by Matias Molinari. Another source has stated that on September 8, 2009, Elaskar became a partner, director, and CEO of Southern Globe Investments Argentina (SGI) Bursátil Sociedad de Bolsa S.A., and that Elskar himself formed the firm with a start-up capital of 320,000 pesos. This same source indicates that Elaskar formed SGI Inversiones y Participaciones S.A. in 2011 with a start-up capital of one million pesos. Yet another source suggests that Elaskar was involved in SGI as early as 2008, with SGI North America LLC being registered in Florida in May 2008 under the joint directorship of Elaskar and Ivanhoe Smester. SGI Ventures LLC, according to this source, was registered in Florida on December 6, 2010, with Elaskar, Matias Molinari, and SGI Argentina SA listed as directors.

Clarín stated in its April 21, 2013 report that it had concluded from its investigation that Elaskar is part of a Miami-based “business network” centered on Molinari's father, the Argentine politician Carlos Molinari, a political ally of the Kirchners and a contributor to the U.S. presidential campaign of Barack Obama. At the time of Clarín’s report, Elaskar was a shareholder in North America LLC and Conway SGI Capital LLC. Clarín noted the participation in both these firms of Smester, who had been convicted in the U.S. of mortgage fraud.

According to corporate records, Elaskar was also Managing Member of a firm called Conway Global, which was registered as an LLC in Florida on December 6, 2011, and dissolved on September 28, 2012. His fellow director was Smester. Elaskar was also the Manager of Dunamis One Limited Liability Company, registered in Florida on February 16, 2012, and also now inactive. On February 3, 2011, Elaskar became director of Assure Investments Limited, registered in the U.K. on June 25, 2010. His predecessor in this position was identified as “Michael Clifford,” a name that Juan Gasparini, in his 2013 book about the corruption of the Kirchner government, identified as a “prestanombre,” or front name, which had appeared in the filing records of more than 1400 companies, and which might or might not be the name of a real person. Elaskar registered Avida Capital Markets Corporation in Florida on August 30, 2011, and dissolved it on September 28, 2012.

== The K money trail ==
In April 2013, Elaskar was featured on the TV news program Periodismo para todos, hosted by Jorge Lanata. Also on the program was businessman and accountant Leonardo Fariña. Elaskar, identified on the program as a “financier” and former “multimillionaire cadet of Lazaro Baez” who was currently “unemployed,” said he had managed “between $50 and 60 million” as head of SGI, which, he stated, had grown to encompass branches in Mendoza, Argentina, and Panama, as well as offices in the United States. Elaskar said on the program that he had met Fariña in January 2011, and that during the first half of that year he had carried out transactions involving about 50 million euros on behalf of Fariña's client Lázaro Báez.

“We acted as intermediaries in the delivery of millions of dollars and euros to overseas companies linked to Lazaro Báez, Martin Báez, and Leandro Báez,” Elaskar said, explaining that these men had “managed to create between 40 and 50 offshore companies” in Belize and in other under-regulated tax havens, and that bank accounts in the Lombard Odier Bank in Switzerland had been involved in these transactions. A key player in this scheme, Elaskar said, was Fabian Rossi, husband of the celebrated actress Iliana Calabro. Elaskar also stated that he had ultimately been forced by persons connected with Báez to sell SGI to a firm called Helvetic Services Group, and was told that if he did not sell, he would “end up like Sebastián Forza,” an entrepreneur who had been killed in a famous triple murder in Buenos Aires in 2008.

When Lanata's program was aired, however, both Elaskar and Fariña claimed that every accusation they had made on camera had been a lie. An investigation ensued, involving hundreds of testimonies and raids.

On April 16, 2013, prosecutor José María Campagnoli filed a criminal lawsuit on April 16, 2013 against Báez for allegedly extorting Elaskar and forcing him to sell SGI.

A May 2013 article in Perfil stated that Elaskar had “a weakness” for “imported vehicles,” noting that he had owned several BMWs and Porsches. The article also mentioned a photograph that had recently been made public, purportedly showing Elaskar's black Porsche parked beside Báez's private airplane. In addition, the article maintained that Elaskar, when living in Miami, had crashed one of his Porsches into a church.

It was reported on June 10, 2013, that Elaskar, in four hours of testimony before Federal Judge Sebastian Casanello and prosecutor Guillermo Marijuan, had denied knowing Báez or the purchasers of SGI. Elaskar had also accused Lanata of carrying out “a hit operation” against the government. Three days later it was reported that Elaskar, who had submitted an appeal to the Buenos Aires Federal Court through his lawyer, Juan Manuel Ubeira, asking that the indictment against him be withdrawn, had withdrawn the appeal. This action was described by Perfil as “a strategy to accelerate the pace toward a public trial.”

Lawyer Jorge Chueco, in an interview published on July 3, 2013, said that he had orchestrated Elaskar's sale of SGI for $1,475,000 to Helvetic, the checks from which had ended up in an account owned by Báez. Chueco said that while arranging the sale, Elaskar had asked that his payment be sent to a foreign firm called Dunamis One Ltd. Chueco and his colleagues refused, whereupon Elaskar, according to Chueco, asked that his payment be made to one Jorge Alberto Cali, which did not happen either.

On October 17, 2013, Elaskar's extortion case against Báez was sent to the Federal Court.

After Federal Judge Sebastian Casanello determined that Elaskar and Fariña were linked to criminal activities and had laundered money, he indicted both men on May 7, 2014, for money laundering. Fariña was indicted on five counts, Elaskar on eight. Both were accused of participating in the whitewashing of funds and in using money that had been obtained through illegal activities. Elaskar was said to have whitewashed more than 25 million pesos “by purchasing high-end cars, properties, land, companies and financial transactions.” Casanello ordered the seizure of 27 million pesos from Elaskar.

A Wall Street Journal article published on July 28, 2014, about the financial scandal surrounding the Kirchners and Báez recounted Elaskar's appearance on Lanata's TV program and his later retraction of his statements. The Journal noted that prosecutor José María Campagnoli had verified Elaskar's and Fariña's connection to Báez and “their involvement in an alleged money-laundering scheme that used a network of shell companies” and had “alleged that Mr. Báez was a frontman for the Kirchners, diverting funds earmarked for public-works projects.” The Journal further reported on Casanello's unsealing of indictments against Fariña and Elaskar “for money laundering unrelated to their alleged involvement with Mr. Báez.” The Journal quoted Elaskar's comment that on Lanata's TV show he had been “put in a sausage-making machine.”

It was reported on August 15, 2014, that the Swiss government had asked Casanello and Marijuan for cooperation on the money-laundering case against Báez, Fariña, and Elaskar. However, neither Switzerland nor Belize had responded to Casanello's request to seize relevant bank accounts in those countries; Panama had rejected such a request. Elaskar was described as having “set up several cardboard companies” in Panama with Fabian Rossi.
