= Miguel Ángel Pires =

Argentine businessman (born 1970)

- Born: December 15, 1970 (age 55); Argentina
- Occupations: businessman, sports agent

Miguel Ángel Pires (born 15 December 1970) is an Argentine businessman who has been a leading figure in several sports-related enterprises in his native country and has served as the agent for many famous soccer players. In 2013 he was implicated in money-laundering scandals involving Argentinian presidents Néstor Kirchner and Cristina Fernández de Kirchner that reportedly made him a millionaire “overnight.”

== Career ==
In the 1990s he worked for HAZ Sport Agency, run by Fernando Hidalgo, which represented soccer players. He was Hildalgo's “right hand” and rose to become the agent for the soccer star Juan Sebastián Verón. He was later able to leave HAZ and form his own businesses, reportedly partly due to his connections with Kirchner, whom Pires has described as a “good friend,” and businessman Lázaro Báez. Pires gained the support and confidence of Báez after having befriended the latter's son. Through Báez, he met Máximo Kirchner, son of the then and current presidents, and as a result he met Néstor Kirchner himself.

Between 2009 and 2010, Pires established the firms MP Sports SA, Building Sports SA, and PIRVI SA Paralelamente. He formed these businesses together with his then boyfriend, Mateo Magadán.

Pires works, or has worked, as an agent for many major Argentinian soccer players, including Nelson Benítez, Matías Sánchez, Mauricio Carrasco, Agustín Orión, Pablo Lugüercio, Juan Sebastián Verón, Gastón Fernández, Maximiliano Núñez, Jonatan Silva, Mauricio Carrasco, and Mariano González. He is closely connected to the team Estudiantes.

Before becoming involved directly with Kirchner, Pires was reportedly engaged in a money-laundering operation with Báez that involved the Racing Club.

The Seprin website reported in 2012 that “at least 8 very important politicians washed money via the transfer of players and this is the basis of the fortune of Miguel Pires y Cristian Villalba.” The site outlined in detail Pires' involvement in the sale and purchase of players and money laundering, and his ties with Báez. Seprin also stated that the Fiscal Investigative Unit had been looking into Pires’ finances, but did not look beyond his financial dealings with Báez and other principals in this particular case.

In May 2013, journalist Jorge Lanata of the television program Periodismo Para Todos (Journalism for All) charged in a now-famous report on high-level government corruption that Pires, when selling the contracts of various soccer players to the team Racing, had been serving as a front man for Kirchner and Kirchner's son Máximo, in accordance with an arrangement made with them and Baez in 2005. Among the players were Marcos Cáceres, Pablo Lugüercio, Leandro González, Rubén Ramírez, Nicolás Cabrera, Pablo Lugüercio, Gabriel Mercado, and Nicolás Pellerano.

The purchases had allegedly been a way of laundering money and are considered an important part of the web of corruption surrounding the administrations of Kirchner and his wife, Cristina Fernández de Kirchner, known as the “K money trail.”

Lanata said that Pires had become a millionaire “overnight” due to his connections with Báez and Kirchner, who each had given him money to buy players and enabled him to lead a luxurious life. Pires, who had grown up in a poor neighborhood, now lived in a fashionable part of Buenos Aires and drove Porsches and Ferraris, Lanata revealed. Lanata suggested that Pires had prospered not only as a result of money laundering, but also through overpricing, bribes, and other illegal activities. A writer for OPI (Organización Periodística Independiente) Santa Cruz opined that the transgressions by Pires and others that had been revealed so far by Lanata appeared to represent “the tip of the iceberg of…an enormous mass of corruption” that remained to be uncovered.

Pires was in a relationship with Cristian Vallaba for eighteen years. He left Vallaba in November 2012 to be in a relationship with Julio Coronel. Coronel was formerly the partner of celebrated Argentinian actor and entrepreneur Ricardo Fort, who died in 2013 and whose family owns a major confectionery company. The day after Lanata's report aired, Fort spoke to Lanata on Radio Mitre, telling him that Pires had given Julio “everything he had with me: cars, credit cards, travel.” The difference, Fort said, was that his own money had been honestly earned by his family, while Pires's money had been “stolen from the people.” Fort noted that while Pires said he did not wish to be known, Julio had posted on Facebook photos of the Lamborghini he had just bought in Miami. Fort also said that he had received threats by phone and text message, presumably from people connected with Pires, who bragged “that they had very strong government connections” and that they would do something to me.”

It was reported in January 2014 that Pires, who was in the middle of a legal struggle over Vallaba’s assets, including “apartments and houses worth millions of dollars,” had “taken refuge” in Miami in the wake of the money-laundering scandal. “He cannot set foot on Argentinian soil,” said a source close to Pires, because if he does, he will “end up behind bars.” The source added that Vallaba was in possession of “very strong pieces of evidence that could harm him and leave him much worse off than he is now.”

== Personal life ==
Pires is openly gay and his relationships with Vallaba and Coronel have made him a subject of considerable attention in the Argentinian gossip columns.

Pires has a home in Miami and an apartment in calle Viamonte in Buenos Aires. Two government filings in 2009 and 2010 identified both Pires and Vallaba as residing at an address on calle Viamonte, but also identified Pires as living at Castro Barros 74 and Liniers 500, both in Bernal, Buenos Aires.
