= 10K, la década robada =

2014 book by Jorge Lanata

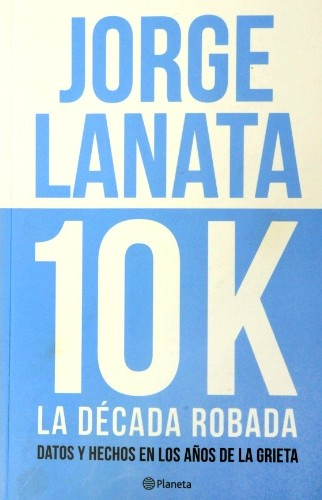
- Book cover, first edition
- Author: Jorge Lanata
- Language: Spanish
- Publisher: Grupo Planeta
- Publication date: 14 April 2014

10K, la década robada (Spanish for "10K, the stolen decade") is a 2014 nonfiction book written by Argentine journalist Jorge Lanata. The name makes reference to Kirchnerism, described by its supporters as "the earned decade"; the letter K is usually used as a symbol of the political movement.

== Content ==
Lanata wrote the book detailing things that he had seen during the governments of Néstor Kirchner and Cristina Fernández de Kirchner. He detailed issues that, according to him, were overlooked before their presidencies, such as the "strong state interventionism" during Kirchner's rule of Santa Cruz. He also commented that he did not mention his suspicions about the corruption charges over the Mothers of the Plaza de Mayo before the Schoklender scandal because of respect for their careers. He also included information about "the route of the K money" scandal, and his view over the ongoing development of the case. He also details the alleged attempts of Fernández de Kirchner government to manipulate the media.
