= Boca Río Gallegos =

- Full name: Club Boca Río Gallegos
- Nickname: Xeneize
- Founded: 12 October 1945; 80 years ago
- Ground: Defensores del Carmen, Río Gallegos
- Capacity: 8,000
- Chairman: Martin Báez
- Manager: none
- League: Liga de fútbol Sur (6th level)
- 2013–14: --
- Website: http://www.bocariogallegos.com
Home colours	Away colours

Club Boca Río Gallegos is an Argentine sports club from the city of Río Gallegos, Santa Cruz. Although other sports are practised (such as basketball, field hockey or taekwondo), the club is mostly known for its football team, which currently plays in the Liga de fútbol Sur, the regionalised 6th level of Argentine football league system.

== History ==
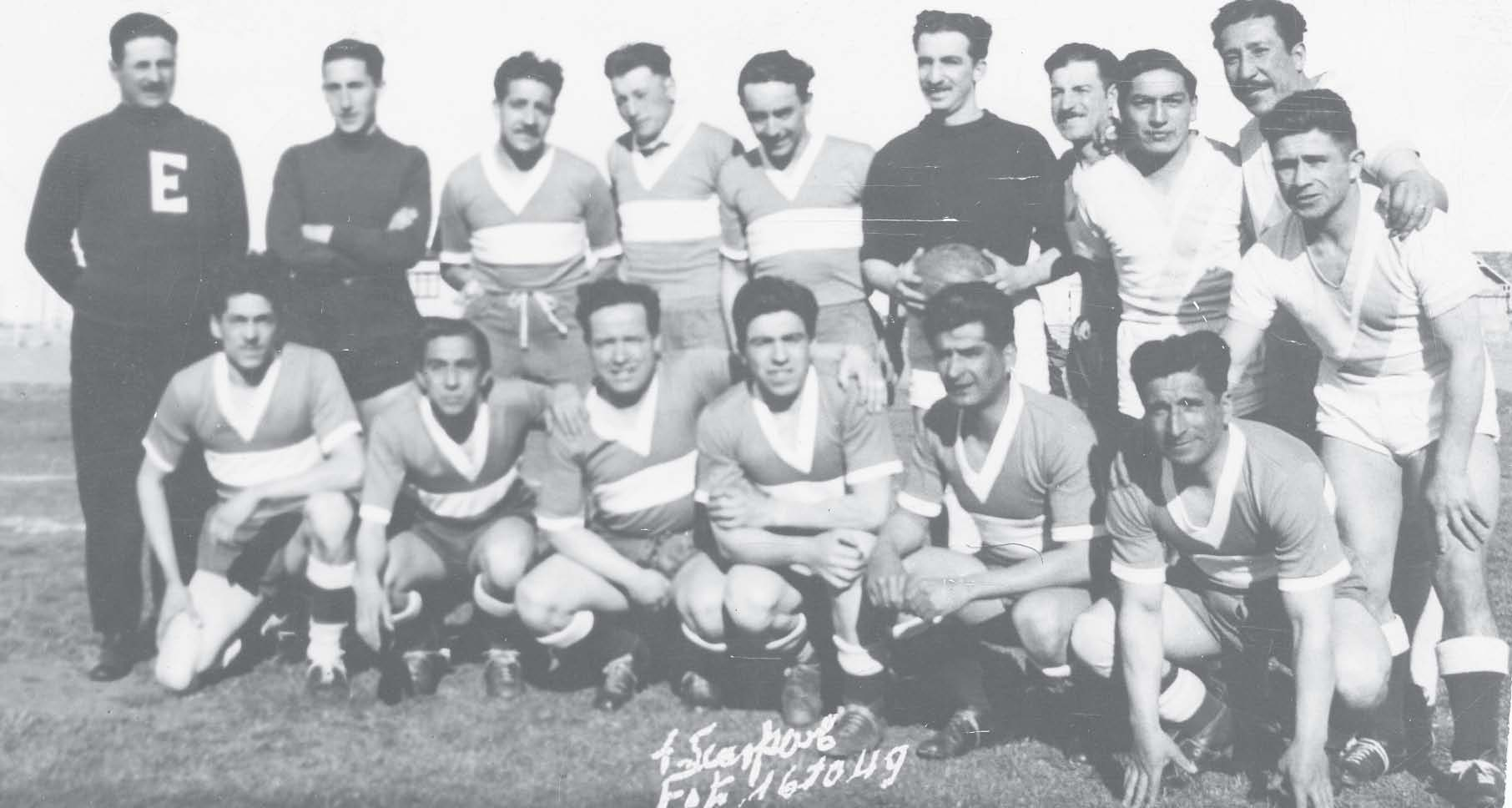
First team of Boca during the 1950s.

The first step in the foundation of Club Boca was given by a group of enthusiastic meat processing plant workers, who decided to join themselves and create a football team in the city of Río Gallegos. But this wouldn't be totally fulfilled until October 12, 1945, which settled down as the official date of foundation of the institution.

In 1988 Boca participated in the Torneo Regional (organized by Asociación del Fútbol Argentino) for the first time. Boca was allowed to play after the teams which had finished first, second and third in the last tournament, declined to participate in the next edition. Boca had finished 4th and therefore could come into the tournament filling the vacant place.

That team was coached by Jacinto Cáceres, who had managed before a well-remembered team of San Lorenzo de Almagro during the Torneo Regional played in 1982. Boca would be soon nicknamed "Boca Coraje" (Courage Boca) due to the Club assumed the compromise of being representing the city of Río Gallegos, having formed a competitive team before the time limit for the beginning of the competition, otherwise they couldn't have played the tournament.

The first championship won by Boca was obtained on October 12, 2008.
