= La ruta del dinero K (book) =

2016 book by Daniel Santoro

- Cover of the first edition
- Author: Daniel Santoro
- Language: Spanish
- Subject: The Route of the K-Money scandal
- Publisher: Ediciones B
- Publication date: 2014
- Publication place: Argentina
- ISBN: 978-987-627-636-8

La ruta del dinero K (Spanish for "the route of the K money", "K" standing for "Kirchnerism") is a 2016 nonfiction book by Argentine journalist Daniel Santoro. It is an investigation about the eponymous political scandal. The book was written when the case got a renewed speed, during the presidency of Mauricio Macri.
