= Silvina Chediek =

Argentine radio and television presenter (born 1962)

- Born: 1 March 1962 (age 64); Buenos Aires, Argentina
- Occupations: Journalist, presenter
- Years active: 1984–present
- Spouse: Jorge Lanata (m. 1990; div. 1991)
- Children: 1

Silvina Chediek (born 1 March 1962) is an Argentine radio and television presenter.

She started in 1984 with the TV program El Espejo, and has taken part in other TV and radio programs such as Imagen de la Radio (1986–1991), Reconocernos (1990–1995), Nunca es tarde (1992), Muestra gratis (1991), Confesiones al oído and Salud con Silvina (1996). From 2015, she is the conductor of Lo mejor de ti.
