= K money trail =

2013 journalistic investigation in Argentina

The K money trail (Spanish: La ruta del dinero K; "K" stands for "Kirchnerism") was a 2013 journalistic investigation into political corruption in Argentina. It began with reports on the Periodismo para todos television program hosted by journalist Jorge Lanata. The investigation was named "the K money trail" to imply that former presidents Néstor Kirchner and Cristina Fernández de Kirchner were involved. The investigation showed embezzlement had taken place and suggested the money trail involved Néstor Kirchner, Cristina Fernández de Kirchner and an alleged partner, businessman Lázaro Báez. The journalists concluded that Báez diverted money intended for public infrastructure to tax havens. The television show led to an official investigation. In April 2016, Lázaro Baez was arrested for corruption charges and jailed in the Ezeiza Federal Prison Complex awaiting trial. In mid-2020 he was transferred to house arrest as the proceedings were put on hold due to the COVID-19 pandemic. In 2021, Báez was sentenced to 12 years in prison for money laundering. In June 2023, a separate case looking into possible wrongdoing by Cristina Kirchner was dismissed after the prosecution failed to produce evidence.

== Development ==
=== Television ===
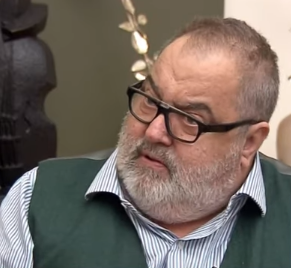
Jorge Lanata in 2019; Periodismo para todos host

Periodismo para todos began its 2013 season on April 14. Jorge Lanata reported that according to the tax return Néstor Kirchner sent to the AFIP, the Argentine revenue-collection agency, he and wife Cristina Fernández de Kirchner had personal wealth of US$1.4 million when he became president in 2003. She was elected president four years later; when Néstor Kirchner died in 2010, their assets were US$14.1 million. Lanata said that there was also a large amount of undeclared money.

The first program included interviews with Leonardo Fariña and Federico Elaskar, who detailed methods used by Lázaro Báez to send €55 million to tax havens. Báez, a businessman from Santa Cruz Province, was a close friend of Néstor Kirchner. Fariña worked for Báez, and Elaskar headed SGI (a financial firm used for money laundering). Elaskar detailed operations at La Rosadita, a firm in the Madero Center building in Puerto Madero. La Rosadita channeled money from Santa Cruz to Uruguay and Uruguay to Switzerland, in €1.5-million increments via shell corporations. Elaskar revealed more than 50 financial firms used for similar transactions; the operation required collaboration by banks as well. Fabián Rossi, husband of actress Iliana Calabró, was accused of managing financial operations in Panama.

Fariña and Elaskar later recanted their statements. Fariña said on the TV program Intrusos en el espectáculo that he knew that he was being filmed, he lied to Lanata and he never carried bags of money. Elaskar said that he lied to harm Fariña. Gossip shows on state-sponsored TV channels called it the "Fariña-Rossi case", focusing on the impact on the television personalities, ignoring ties to Báez and Kirchner and downplaying the corruption charges. Rossi said that Fariña and Elaskar were deluded.

Eduardo Arnold, vice-governor of Santa Cruz during Néstor Kirchner's presidency, said on the TV program La cornisa that in 2001 Cristina Kirchner showed him a vault in her home in El Calafate for the family's savings; Arnold suspected that the vault, larger than a home safe, confirmed the alleged money laundering.

In later programs, Lanata presented more evidence for the allegations. The second episode focused on the relationship between Báez and the Kirchners. Lanata documented agreements between Báez and Néstor Kirchner authorizing a builder, Austral Construcciones (owned by Báez), to build apartments on land owned by Kirchner. These documents had already been sent to the courts by deputy Elisa Carrió, who alleged illegal collaboration by Báez, Kirchner and minister Julio de Vido. Lanata also detailed unusual growth in Báez's finances since the beginning of the Kirchner presidencies, and favoritism toward Austral Construcciones in the awarding of the majority of public contracts in the province. According to the Swiss bank Teegan, a shell corporation wholly owned by Lázaro Báez's son Martín, transferred $1.5 million. Jorge Harguindeguy, former Argentine ambassador to Panama, confirmed the Panamanian operations of La Rosadita. Travel records obtained by La Nación indicate that Fariña, Rossi, Martín Báez and Daniel Pérez Gadín (Báez's accountant) all visited Panama, often at the same time. Fariña flew from Uruguay to Panama on the official plane of Chaco Province, governed by Kirchner supporter Jorge Capitanich.

On April 28, Lanata detailed links between minister Julio de Vido, Kirchner and Báez. De Vido allegedly requested bribes for Báez. Estela Kank, former owner of Kank y Costilla, described collusion by De Vido and Báez to force her to sell her company to Báez. Sergio Acevedo, former governor of Santa Cruz, said that Kirchner demanded an increase of over 300% in Báez's monthly public-works budget. Acevedo made similar accusations against the Kirchners in 2009, saying that public works in the province were always performed by firms associated with Báez.

Lanata aired an interview with Miriam Quiroga, Néstor Kirchner's secretary, who described people moving full bags of money from the Casa Rosada and the Quinta de Olivos to El Calafate (Kirchner's hometown) with the Tango 01 presidential aircraft. When later, in 2015, Quiroga was questioned by Judge Luis Rodríguez she confessed that these were false allegations intended to promote a book on the subject co-authored with her husband.

In the 2014 Lanata's interview with Quiroga, she alleged Cristina Fernández de Kirchner was aware of the operations; although she could not confirm the existence of a vault at the Kirchners' house, what she overheard made her suspect that it was likely. Former prosecutor Andrés Vivanco said that Báez's wealth is actually Néstor Kirchner's. He described two other vaults in Río Gallegos: one belonging to Cristina Kirchner, the other to Báez. The May 12 program included an interview with Antonio Cañas, the Kirchners' architect, who described the existence and location of a safe in their house's architectural plan.

On May 19, Lanata made further accusations of money laundering against Néstor Kirchner, his son Máximo, Lázaro Báez and sports agent Miguel Ángel Pires involving the acquisition of soccer players (including Rubén Ramírez, Pablo Lugüercio, Marcos Cáceres, Nicolás Cabrera, Leandro González and Martín Wagner) for Racing Club de Avellaneda.

Elisa Carrió accused Báez of removing evidence from a vault at his house, and a witness who helped empty the vault had photos and bags. At a press conference at his house, Báez showed reporters a wine cellar at the location of the alleged vault. Carrió replied that the photos showed both the wine cellar and the vault, and the wine cellar shown by Báez was next to a freshly-painted wall. Lanata aired the photos, explaining how Báez could have emptied the vault and prepared the area for invited journalists.

A search and seizure took place at Madero Center several days after the first program. On June 16, Lanata aired security-camera tapes showing the removal of boxes, papers and file folders on April 12 at 14:20 (two days before the first program aired) and April 18 at 16:22 (hours before the search and seizure).

La Nación exposed a business connection between President Cristina Fernández de Kirchner and Lázaro Báez: they co-owned an 87 ha (210-acre) plot of land outside El Calafate. She bought a half-share in 2006 and in turn sold it to Báez in 2008. Báez built a road and a luxury hotel; he paid rent for one-third of the rooms (even if they were empty), channeling public money to the Kirchners. Several politicians criticized the conflict of interest; deputies Patricia Bullrich and Laura Alonso asked the anticorruption office to investigate the situation, and Elisa Carrió and Mariana Zuvic asked to add this information to ongoing investigations.

On August 18 Lanata said that according to official reports, Cristina Kirchner visited the Seychelles on January 21 and 22, although there was no record of presidential activities on those days. The islands were mentioned by Elaskar as a fiscal destination. Several months after her visit, Seychelles no longer met the criteria for tax havens. Lanata also said that Néstor Kirchner created a shell subsidiary of his Panamanian corporation in Ireland. Oscar Parrilli said that Cristina Kirchner's stay in Seychelles was 13 hours rather than two days, and criticized Lanata for blindly accepting official information. Parrilli called Lanata a hitman and Grupo Clarín a threat to democracy. In return, Lanata sued Parrilli for harassment. Lanata aired an interview with Venezuelan journalist Nella De Luca, who was at Kirchner's hotel and confirmed her presence. Horacio Quiroga, a former businessman associated with Báez, described links from Báez and Néstor Kirchner to Lanata and the magazine Noticias. Quiroga and Báez worked for the oil firms Epsur and Mishar, and were visited by an agent for Kirchner; his testimony was included in the court case.

In January 2019, information emerged about Patricia Bullrich, Minister of Security of Mauricio Macri's administration, paying ARS 200,000 to Fariña "for information that would implicate people linked to the Kirchner's management."

=== Judiciary ===
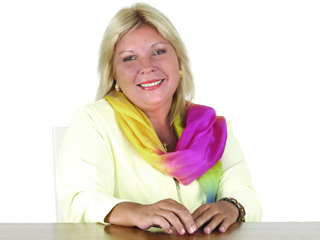
Deputy Elisa Carrió filed a court case.

Several politicians petitioned the courts after the first program was aired. Deputy Elisa Carrió filed a case with judge Julián Ercolini, who was already investigating Lázaro Báez for conspiracy. Ercolini gave Carrió's case to a Kirchner supporter, judge Sebastián Casanello. Prosecutor Guillermo Marijuan began an investigation; attorney Alejandro Sánchez Kalbermatten filed a similar case against Lázaro Báez, his sons Martín Báez and Leandro Báez, Daniel Pérez Gadín and Fabián Rossi after Carrio's, but before her case was given to Casanello. The prosecutor was Miguel Ángel Osorio. Attorney Ricardo Monner Sans and deputies Manuel Garrido and Graciela Ocaña filed additional cases. Since the cases were similar, President of the Federal Chamber Martín Irurzun had to decide which judge would preside. Canicoba Corral rejected the case and sent it to Casanello, who sent it to the Federal Chamber; Casanello was finally confirmed as judge.

Canicoba Corral roled that although a hidden camera may be acceptable as proof in investigative journalism, it is inadmissible in court, adding that he had not analyzed the case and had no opinion. Argentine case law does not accept hidden cameras as proof of crime, since they constitute self-incrimination. However, they are admissible when witnesses have conflicting testimony; an unedited film may clarify which witness is more accurate.

Prosecutors Ramiro González and Carlos Gonella asked Casanello for an investigation of Fariña and Elaskar when he was confirmed as judge. Their initial request did not mention Lázaro Báez or the Kirchners, but was open to expansion. The prosecutors requested unedited copies of both films aired by Periodismo para todos and the later TV programs, where Fariña and Elaskar said that they had lied. Jorge Lanata gave his testimony to the prosecutor José María Campagnoli on April 22. Senator Mario Cimadevilla of the Radical Civic Union criticized Gils Carbó for the appointment of prosecutors, including Gonella, without Senate approval. Carbó streamlined the appointment system, and the charges against him were dropped ten days later. Guillermo Marijuan appealed this, saying that he had received death threats against his daughters and was receiving protection. Campagnoli mentioned that the AFIP, IGJ and Migrations refused to give him information.

Fariña and Elaskar presented their testimony on June 10. Elaskar said that Lanata had scripted what he said on television, and denied any personal relationship with Báez. He also denied being coerced to sell his company (which he had said on TV) and said that the shell-corporation documents were forged by Lanata. Elaskar refused to reveal whether or not he had assets abroad, and said that he did not remember details about the sale of his firm. Fariña said that he had received $70,000 working for a man close to Báez, in addition to payment for his wife's artwork. He denied transporting bags of money, saying that he visited Uruguay and Mexico as a tourist. But, he acknowledged working for Báez at Austral Construcciones. Since the income detailed by Fariña was insufficient for his lifestyle, Casanello broadened his investigation.

Carrió provided photos and a witness to the emptying of a vault at Báez's house in Santa Cruz; Casanello gave the witness protection, and proposed to send the case to the judiciary of the Santa Cruz province. Marijuan, however, thought it should be incorporated into the existing case. His appeal was received by the Federal Chamber and upheld by judges Horacio Cattani, Martín Irurzun and Eduardo Farah. Casanello ordered a search of Baez's house, including his safes. The investigation, 15 days after the accusation, was fruitless. Casanello also ordered a search of the walls, to determine if there had been a vault. The judge closed the cause after concluding that there never existed at Lázaro Báez's farm house the vaults that Lanata's TV report denounced as the storage of money related to its own accusations.

Báez' lawyers asked Campagnoli to recuse the prosecutor, claiming that his sister was affiliated with the Civic Coalition Carrió led. Carbó accused him of abuse of authority and infringing on other prosecutors' jurisdictions. Campagnoli replied that he was just doing his job, and was supported by prosecutors' organizations.

In June 2023, the case looking into possible wrongdoing by Cristina Fernández de Kirchner was dismissed after the prosecution failed to produce evidence.

==== Related cases ====
There was no immediate search and seizure as a result of the first program. Although five cases were heard by two judges at that point, any judge could have secured potential evidence without waiting for the combining of the cases. Opposition parties criticized the lack of immediate action, attributing it to government-appointed chief of prosecutors Alejandra Gils Carbó. Several neighbours reported on April 17 that documentation was removed from the Madero Center (the alleged location of La Rosadita) over a several-hour period; a search and seizure was conducted the following day. Casanello requisitioned security-camera tapes to ascertain if documents were removed before the operation, and the investigation suggested that information may have been erased from computers between the first program and the search-and-seizure operation. It was discovered that Austral Construcciones (owned by Lázaro Báez and operating with large sums of money) was a client of La Rosadita and its telephones had Báez on speed dial. The son of Daniel Pérez Gadín (Báez's accountant) was identified in the security tapes as one of the men removing papers, boxes and file folders before the search and seizure; Casanello opened a separate investigation.

Still not charged, Báez sued Fariña and Elaskar for defamation and subpoenaed Jorge Rial and Luis Ventura (hosts of Intrusos...) as witnesses. Fariña's suit was heard by judge Raúl García, and Elaskar's by judge Fernando Pigni. García dismissed the suit.

Prosecutor Guillermo Marijuan extended the investigation on May 4 to Lázaro Báez, his son Martín, Báez's accountant Daniel Pérez Gadín and Fabián Rossi. He criticized Gonella for not including them in the original case, and for investigating Fariña and Elaskar only when the case made the news. Legislator Julio Raffo, from Proyecto Sur, accused public official Gonella of nonfeasance in office.

Elisa Carrió said that Miriam Quiroga's testimony was similar to her 2008 reports during an ongoing corruption case against Néstor Kirchner, Báez, Julio De Vido, Carlos Zannini, Ricardo Jaime, Claudio Uberti and Rudy Ulloa, and hoped that judge Julián Ercollini would expedite the case. Quiroga's testimony was heard by judge Julián Ercolini. She testified that Kirchner instructed Rudy Ulloa and Cristobal López to buy media and how to manage public works, but did not remember details. Quiroga was not asked about the bags of money she mentioned in Lanata's program because it concerned a different case; that testimony will be heard by judge Luis Rodríguez. Daniel Muñoz, Kirchner's former secretary, was accused by prosecutor Ramiro González of involvement in the conspiracy. Pablo Senyszyn, Néstor Kirchner's bodyguard, denied seeing money bags and said that any bags would have been detected by security; he was suspended and replaced by Claudia Katok and Cristina Caamaño.

=== International response ===
The Uruguayan Air Force and Uruguayan customs began an informal investigation of the Uruguayan link. Elaskar testified that Fariña sent the bags of money to Uruguayan financial companies, which in turn sent them to Switzerland. The Uruguayans investigated whether the flights were destined to Carrasco and whether the dates and crews matched. Deputy Juan Manuel Garino called for an investigation of a possible security breach at Uruguayan airports. Ministers Fernando Lorenzo and Eleuterio Fernández Huidobro addressed the Uruguayan Congress, describing controls on money laundering. Uruguayan President José Mujica said that such banking operations would not go unnoticed in his country, but acknowledged that money may have been smuggled; the minister of defense revealed the existence of more than 900 unregulated airports. The Uruguayan case was conducted by judge Martín Gesto and prosecutor José Gómez, with Interpol support. Before the Uruguayan Congress, judge Néstor Valetti criticized a lack of Argentine co-operation. Argentine deputy Graciela Ocaña accused the chancellery of blocking communications between the countries. As of January 2014, the investigation was stalled.

The Swiss courts began their own investigation with information from Argentine deputies Garrido and Ocaña; however, Switzerland required input from the Argentine judiciary to pursue the case. Le Matin and Tages-Anzeiger reported the ongoing Argentine controversy, and public opinion opposed illicit money in Swiss banks. However, the Swiss case is not directly related to the Argentine one. Casanello and prosecutor Marijuan were invited to Switzerland to confer with local judges, but their trip was cancelled.

Casanello formally requested information about Teegan from the Panamanian courts. Since Báez has at least six companies in Florida, Elisa Carrió informed local prosecutors and American legislator Carl Levin (a money-laundering expert) about the case.

== Reactions ==
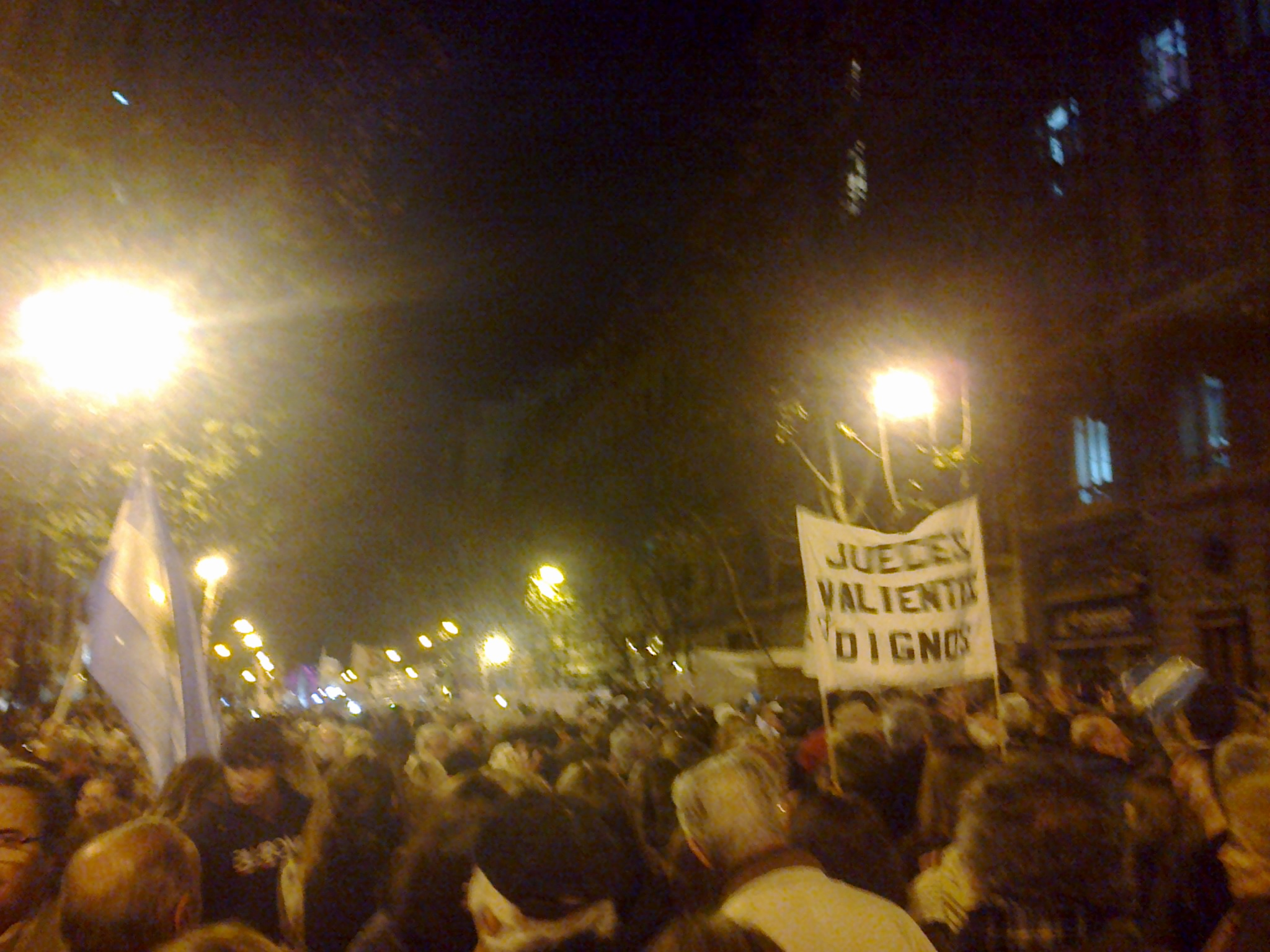
Demonstration in support of José María Campagnoli.

Initially, the government had no comment about the controversy. Only deputy Carlos Kunkel said that although he did not know Lázaro Báez, if he committed a crime he had to go to prison; however, he thought there was insufficient evidence. Governor of Santa Cruz province Daniel Peralta denied any connection to Báez, saying that public works in the province were financed by the national government since 2008 through Vialidad Nacional. Once a Kirchner supporter, Peralta had turned to Federal Peronism. He said that the national government had invested $770 million in public works from 2007 to 2012, and that control of such finances was the purview of the SIGEN. Minister Julio de Vido considered the scandal an attempt to halt construction of the dams Néstor Kirchner and Jorge Cepernic Dams. Báez, in a news conference where he took no questions, considered it an attempt to defame Néstor Kirchner; he questioned Fariña and Elaskar's reliability and the authenticity of the documents shown on the program.

Since Leonardo Fariña was the husband of television personality Karina Jelinek, the government tried to treat the program's revelations as a dispute between TV presenters on its controlled TV channels to discredit it. It hoped focusing Fariña would deflect attention from Kirchner. This attempt failed, and the extended coverage increased awareness of the controversy among the apolitical population. Details of the money's being weighed (instead of counted) and politicians' home vaults increased lay understanding of the corruption controversy's scope.

Public interest in the controversy resembled that in a telenovela; a large portion of the population awaited each new airing of Periodismo para todos, and its revelations were discussed during the week. A survey concerning the controversy found that 80% of the respondents followed it, 70% thought the accusations were true and 65% thought it affected the president's public image. Two-thirds of the respondents agreed that the level of corruption during the Kirchner presidencies was similar (or higher) than that during the presidency of Carlos Menem. Public reception of the controversy may have been influenced by the ongoing economic crisis, the suspicion of presidential involvement and Lanata's persuasiveness.

National deputy Andrés Larroque considered the scandal a veiled coup attempt by the media. Writer Ricardo Forster minimized the significance of political corruption, considering interest in it by the media a threat to democracy. Presidential secretary Oscar Parrilli accused media groups of attempting to generate terrorism against the Kirchner presidencies. Presidential undersecretary Gustavo López said that the scandal was caused by corporate group warfare against the government. Alleged threats to democracy and allegations of coup attempts are a common element of Kirchnerite criticism of political opposition since the 2008 Argentine government conflict with the agricultural sector.

The government tried to shrink the audience for Periodismo para todos by rescheduling the most-important soccer match of the week against it. The tactic was unsuccessful; Lanata received 24.7 rating points, compared with 16 for the Boca-Newell's Old Boys match. Journalist Jorge Fernández Díaz said that soccer matches had not been scheduled so late the previous year, when Periodismo para todos had an average of 15 ratings points instead of 25. The June 16 match between River Plate and Lanús violated an Argentine Football Association rule requiring the last two matches of teams with chances to win a tournament to be played concurrently.

Although Lázaro Báez intended to run for governor of Santa Cruz province in 2015, as of April 2013 he engaged in no political activity in the Justicialist Party or the Front for Victory. The "Route of the K-Money" episode of Periodismo para todos won a silver medal for Best Investigative Report in the 2014 New York Festivals.

== Bibliography ==
- Mendelevich, Pablo (2013). El relato kirchnerista en 200 expresiones. Ediciones B. ISBN 978-987-627-412-8.
