= Día D =

Día D (Spanish: D-Day) is an Argentine journalism television programme, aired by América TV. It was led by Jorge Lanata, Adolfo Castelo, Martín Caparrós, Reynaldo Sietecase, Andrés Klipphan, Maximiliano Montenegro, Andrea Rodríguez and Gisela Marziotta.

== Awards and nominations ==
Award	Year	Work	Category	Result	Ref
Martín Fierro Awards	1996	Día D	Best TV journalist program	Won	
Martín Fierro Awards	1996	Jorge Lanata	Best work in journalism	Won	
Martín Fierro Awards	1997	Día D	Best TV journalist program	Won	
Martín Fierro Awards	1997	Jorge Lanata	Best work in journalism	Won	
Martín Fierro Awards	1999	Día D	Best TV journalist program	Won	
Martín Fierro Awards	1999	Jorge Lanata	Best male work in journalism	Nominated	
Martín Fierro Awards	2001	Jorge Lanata	Best male work in journalism	Won	
Martín Fierro Awards	2003	Jorge Lanata	Best male work in journalism	Won	
