= Mausoleum of Néstor Kirchner =

Burial site in Santa Cruz, Argentina

Coordinates: 51°38′10″S 69°13′17″W

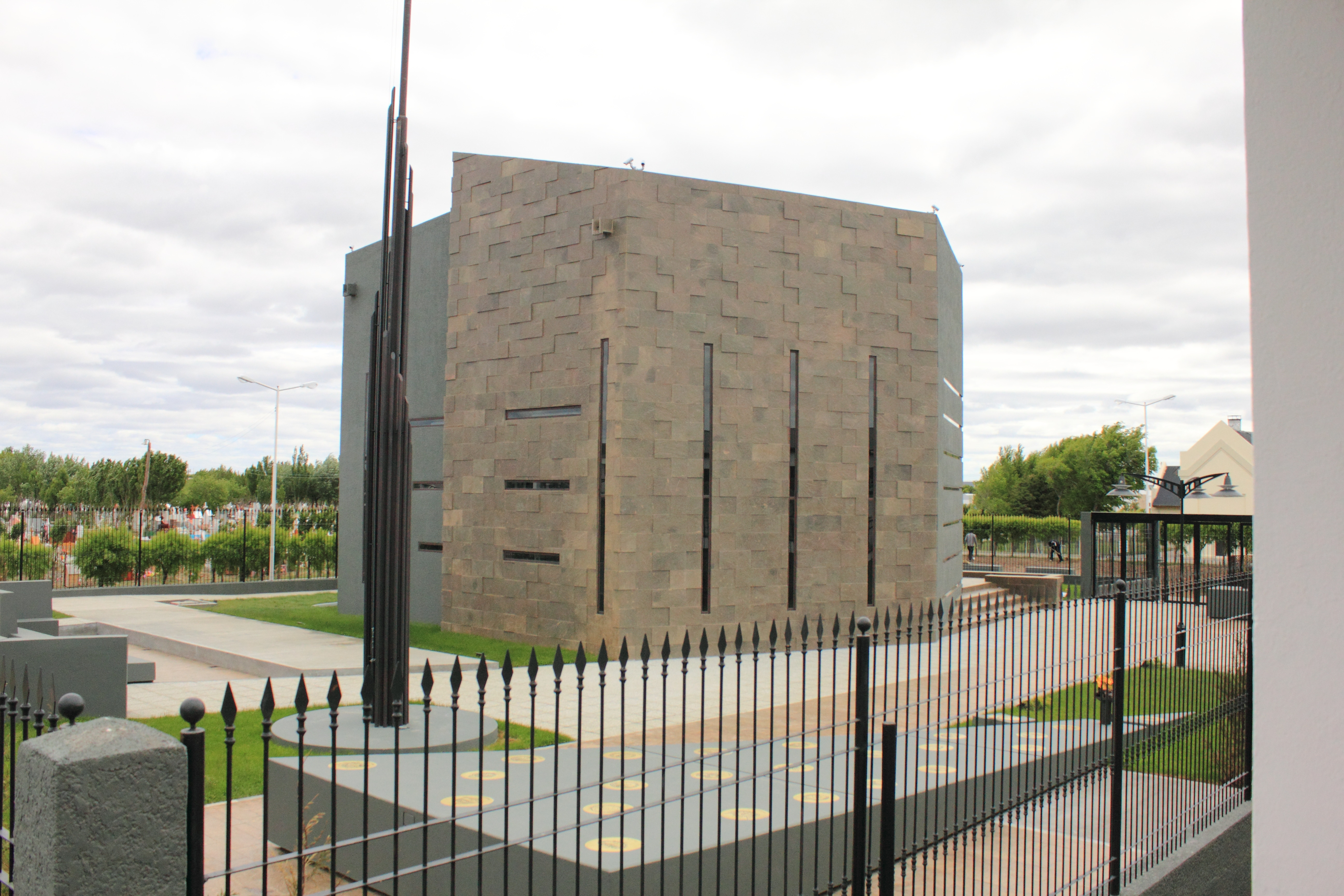
Mausoleum of Néstor Kirchner.

The Mausoleum of Néstor Kirchner is located at Río Gallegos, Santa Cruz, Argentina. It was built in 2011, one year after his death and state funeral. It houses the remains of Kirchner and his parents; Ana María Ostoic died in 2013. It was built by Lázaro Báez and it is 13 meters long, 15 meters wide and 11 meters tall.

== Bibliography ==
- Mendelevich, Pablo (2013). El relato kirchnerista en 200 expresiones. Ediciones B. ISBN 978-987-627-412-8.
