= Agustín Lanata =

Argentine footballer

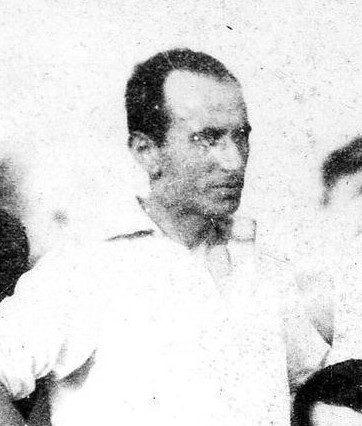
- Lanata in Quilmes

Personal information
- Full name: Agustín José Lanata
- Date of birth: ?
- Place of birth: Buenos Aires, Argentina
- Date of death: December 5, 1967 Buenos Aires
- Position: Defender

Youth career
- 1910–1912: Independiente

Senior career*
Years	Team	Apps	(Gls)
1913–1915	River Plate		
1912–1913	Independiente	9	
1913–1915	River Plate	57 (total)	(4)
1916–1917	Columbian	36	
1918	Boca Juniors	6	
1919–21	Quilmes	69	
1922	Banfield	20	
1923–24	Quilmes	69 (total)	
1924	Wilde		
- * Club domestic league appearances and goals

Agustín Lanata (c.1890–1967) was an Argentine association football player, who played for River, Independiente, Banfield and Quilmes.

== Career ==
Lanata began his career with Independiente, being one of the footballers who played the first match for Club Atlético Independiente in the Primera División, the top-flight of football in Argentina.

Lanata then moved to River Plate, where he stayed from 1912 to 1916, playing about forty games and scoring four goals. In 1914, Lanata won the Copa de Competencia Jockey Club with the club. That year River qualified to play the Tie Cup, which the club would win being River Plate's first international title after defeating Uruguayan team Bristol 1–0.

In 1918, Lanata played fleetingly for Boca Juniors, then he went onto Banfield and eventually ended his career with Quilmes Atlético Club.

His grandson, the journalist Jorge Lanata founded in 1987 the paper Pagina/12.
