= Leonardo Fariña =

Argentine accountant (born 1986)

- Born: Jorge Leonardo Fariña; 5 October 1986 (age 39); La Plata, Buenos Aires, Argentina
- Occupations: Accountant; businessman
- Spouse: Karina Jelinek (m. 2011; div. 2013)

Jorge Leonardo Fariña (born 5 October 1986) is an Argentine who was implicated in the political scandal known as "The Route of the K-Money" involving entrepreneur Lázaro Báez.

Until Fariña became the target of a probe into money laundering in 2013, he was known to the Argentine public chiefly as the husband of famous model Karina Jelinek, who separated from him after the scandal broke. Because of his high-level involvement in the money manipulations and his marriage to Jelinek, Fariña attracted a great deal of media attention and was identified as the "man most wanted by the [TV interview] programs." The controversy swirling around both his personal and professional life caused La Nación to state that he was at the centre of one of the "scandals of the year."

As of mid 2014, Fariña is in prison awaiting trial.

== Early life and education ==
Fariña grew up in a working-class neighborhood in La Plata.

He attended the National University of La Plata to obtain the degree of accountant, however, he dropped out. In June 2013, La Nación stated that Fariña had been "a student of accounting until three years ago," but in the same publication it stated that he dropped it out.

Early in his career, he worked at Dow Agrosciences Argentina.

== Career ==
Due to personal connections, Fariña quickly rose to a pivotal role in the orbit of President Néstor Kirchner and businessman Lázaro Báez, playing various roles in Kirchnerite business activities and financial transactions that would later become the subject of investigation and prosecution. He was part of a circle of high-earning and high-living young men surrounding Kirchner, but was reportedly the only one who was able to "maintain his expensive tastes and expenses" after Kirchner's death. The article described Fariña's connection with powerful leaders as "inexplicable" to "many of those who interacted with him." Fariña would later be described in La Nación as having been "bold and arrogant" and "unpolished" by the usual "corporate standards," and as having exuded an air of mystery. Even as he "moved millions," he "could owe 500 to 1000 pesos to several friends."

Fariña opened a consulting firm named Andrómeda, but other businessmen suspected the legality of his operations, noting that Andrómeda did not have a landline phone or a corporate e-mail address. The only contact information available for the firm consisted of Fariña's own cell phone and his e-mail address at gmail.com.

In late 2010, Fariña approached businessmen and Kirchner intimate Carlos Molinari, head of the firm Rei Fiduciaria, with the idea of starting a luxury-car rental agency. Molinari approved of the idea and gave money to Fariña to purchase a fleet of luxury cars and rent them to millionaires. The company paid for Fariña's and Jelinek's wedding.

In February 2013, Fariña was detained at the airport in Ezeiza with $20,000 he was planning to take to Chile.

== Marriage to Karina Jelinek ==
Fariña gained celebrity as the husband of the famous model Karina Jelinek, whom he met at a party where they were introduced by mutual friends. "We met in Punta del Este," she later recalled. "Leo won me over with his nature…. He treated me like a queen." Karina Jelinek was "struck by the high standard of living of a man who was just over 24 years old" and who, despite his humble upbringing, already owned "several high-end cars" and "an apartment on Avenida Del Libertador" and enjoyed "trips to Miami on private jets." She said, however, that his millionaire status did not matter to her; what mattered was that he was "sweet." Three and a half months later, she proposed to him at a bowling alley. Three hundred and fifty guests, including leading politicians, businessmen, models, actors, and journalists, attended their 2011 wedding at the luxurious Palermo Tattersall.

== Accusations and investigations ==
On 14 April 2013, Periodismo para todos (Journalism for All), an investigative-journalism series on Argentinian TV hosted by Jorge Lanata, presented an episode entitled "The K money trail" that included hidden-camera footage on which Fariña described in detail the financial manoeuvres whereby Lázaro Báez, a businessman close to the Kirchners, managed to transfer about 55 million euros from Argentina to Switzerland. Fariña said he had aided in this money-laundering operation, and it was established that the link between Báez and Fariña was Molinari, who was described as the "protector" of Fariña.

Fariña claimed in a 16 April interview on the Intrusos program, hosted by Jorge Rial, that he was not involved in money laundering. He called Lanata an "anti-government operator" and accused him of "haughty arrogance." Fariña said that he had met Báez's son Martin through his work as a financial advisor to Austral Construcciones SA, that he had thereafter held meetings with the elder Báez and given him advice, and that he had subsequently met Néstor Kirchner through Báez. Fariña also maintained that he had known all along that he was being recorded on the Lanata show: "Lanata wanted fiction, so I gave him fiction," he claimed. In reply to Fariña, Lanata said: "I love everything you're saying…because it enhances what we will show next Sunday."

On 17 April 2013, La Nación stated that Fariña had been the subject of an official report, issued a year and a half earlier, on a "suspicious operation." On the same date, La Nación reported that in November 2010, at a meeting with a company involved with a multibillion hydroelectric project, Fariña had been presented as a representative of the Development Bank of China, and, to the surprise of his interlocutors, had exhibited knowledge of information that was supposedly known only to the Ministry of Strategic Planning. Also on 17 April, La Nación reported that on March 10, Federal Judge Adolfo Ziulu, in response to a complaint by the tax authorities, had issued a restraint on alienation of properties against Fariña in the amount of 314,686.52 pesos (US$38,000). It was additionally reported on April 17 that Fariña had again been caught on hidden camera, this time on the Rial program, during which he had been recorded while the program was on a commercial break. Fariña said during this break that he did not talk about his business activities to his wife "because it's a danger."

La Nación reported on 19 April 2013, that federal prosecutor Ramiro Gonzales had asked federal judge Sebastian Casanello to order an investigation into alleged money laundering by Fariña and Elaskar. The transactions in question, which involved sums adding up to some 20 million pesos (US$2.4 million), were not those that the two men had admitted on Lanata's show to carrying out on behalf of Báez, but other activities that had taken place in 2010 and 2011. Proselac, the Office of Economic Crime and Money Laundering, had received three reports of suspicious transactions from the Financial Intelligence Unit (FIU), headed by José Sbattella. Much of the FIU's attention was focused on Fariña's cash purchases of "high-end cars." The report stated that on the evening of 18 April, the offices of Elaskar's firm SGI had been raided, as had Fariña's offices in his home in La Plata, and that documents had been seized at both places.

It was reported on 27 April 2013, that, according to sources in the aviation sector, Fariña had flown several times, always at night, to Punta del Este, Uruguay, "in different private planes." Moreover, Fariña had used airports where the customs controls were less strict. Media reports on 28 April stated that Fariña had also traveled frequently on private planes to the United States, Mexico, Italy, Panama, Chile, Uruguay, and Argentina during the previous three years, in some cases returning within hours, a pattern of activity that had raised the suspicions of investigators. According to the manifest of one flight, Fariña had been the only passenger, and the cargo had consisted of "personal effects."

On 30 April 2013, Báez filed legal actions with federal judge Sebastian Casanello against both Fariña and Elaskar for having defamed him on Lanata's program.

On 30 May 2013, it was reported that Casanello had ordered Elaskar and Fariña to testify in court about money laundering on their part, evidence of which had been collected by the FIU on the orders of prosecutor Carlos Gonella. On 3 June Fariña failed to present himself in court for a scheduled inquest, of which his lawyer Ivan Mendoza had requested a postponement. In early June, Maximiliano Acosta testified in court that he, Fariña, and Maximiliano Goff, during a January 2011 stay in Uruguay, had been offered the right to purchase a 150-hectare plot of Uruguayan beachfront property, called The Entrevero, which Acosta had ended up buying as a front man for Daniel Perez Gadin, an associate of Báez. Also involved in the transaction were Carlos Molinari and his son Matthias, who planned to build a real estate development on the site. Although promised a sizable commission, Acosta received nothing, and later received death threats, presumably from persons close to Báez, as a result of which he moved to Uruguay. On 5 June 2013, Acosta requested judicial protection for himself and his family.

On 6 June, Casanello froze Fariña's and Elaskar's assets and ordered them to appear in court for questioning on June 10. Both men presented themselves in court on that date and spent several hours answering the judge's questions. Fariña repeated his claim that he had known Lanata was doing a hidden-camera program and that everything he had said on the program was "fiction." Fariña admitted having bought land in Mendoza at Báez's request, but denied having transported bags of money for Báez and said that his numerous flights to Uruguay had been "sightseeing trips." Both he and Elaskar denied that Báez had run a money-laundering operation, and both accused Lanata of promulgating lies in an effort to overturn the government.

Testifying again before Casanello in June 2013, Fariña said that he was an auditor for Austral Construcciones, a firm owned by Báez, and that he worked under Molinari, who paid him a monthly salary of 70,000 pesos (US$8,460). It was reported on 12 June 2013, however, that Fariña's official earnings could not account for the amount of money he had spent in recent years on various high-ticket items, such as his apartment in Buenos Aires and a number of cars, including two Ferraris, an Audi, and a BMW. It was also reported that Fariña had told Casanello that his flights to Mexico and Uruguay had been paid for by Molinari. In addition, Fariña said that Molinari's car-leasing firm had paid him several hundred thousand pesos in commissions. He outlined various other business activities in which he had been involved with Lazaro and Martin Báez. A June 16 report indicated that details of Fariña's financial relationship to SGI had been uncovered. On 17 June, a complaint was filed against him for tax evasion.

In early July 2013, a court rejected Báez's suit against Fariña for allegedly defaming him on Lanata's program. Appearing in early July on a TV interview show, Fariña repeated his claim that he had not been telling the truth on Lanata's program. He said that his standard of living had "not changed since I met Karina," that he had never committed a wrongful act, and that he was "proud" to have known and worked with Báez. He asked Lanata for the "right to reply," charging the journalist with manipulating his on-camera testimony. "I have been mistaken in many things," he said, "but I'm not a criminal." In September 2013, Casanello ordered a raid on Molinari's firm Rei Fiduciaria, in order to determine the legitimacy of Fariña's claim that his lavish lifestyle could be accounted for by his income from Rei Fudiciaria.

== Separation and divorce ==
Fariña's marriage to Jelinek was the frequent subject of headlines in the Argentinian press in the months following Lanata's program. On 18 April 2013, La Nación reported that Jelinek's life had "become an inferno" since the program aired. "I love him, he's my husband," she told reporters, but added that she and Fariña were "now at an impasse." A 23 April article reported that Fariña and Jelinek were still living together, despite everything. It was reported on 22 May 2013, that Jelinek, in the next few hours, would be flying to Miami "to get away from journalistic harassment, rethink her relationship with Leo Fariña, and make some decisions relating to her future career." Fariña was reportedly "very angry" and felt abandoned in a moment of crisis. According to an 18 June report, Jelinek had said that she still loved Fariña but that their marriage was in a "stalemate." Asked in an early July TV interview if she knew about the investigation into the K money trail, Jelinek said that she knew "nothing about politics," but asserted that she believed in her husband and denied having separated from him. Fariña showed on camera some of his 19 tattoos, including one that read: "Only God can judge me."

On 28 August 2013, Jelinek ended the marriage, reportedly motivated less by his legal troubles than by his extramarital indiscretions during travels abroad. "Lately he changed a lot," she explained, "and I was very neglected as a woman. He didn't even want me to accompany him on his trips; there was always some excuse." In a September 2 interview, she called Fariña an "idiot" (boludo) and affirmed that they were now separated. Although she had supported him over the money-laundering charges, recent revelations about his infidelities had caused her to distrust him fully. In reaction, Fariña gave a phone interview to Jorge Rial on Intrusos in which he accused Jelinek of breaking a "pact" she had with him and trying to commit extortion against him. He made lewd remarks publicly about Jelinek, which she completely dismissed.

Jelinek filed for divorce and, in September, went to court to ask that his estate be preserved intact in expectation of liens that she expected to file. "I don't want to lose any more," she said. She also asked for police protection, telling prosecutor Guillermo Marijuan that she felt threatened because she claimed Fariña was prone to violence, a charge Fariña denied. The couple's first settlement hearing was held on September 24. La Nación noted that although Fariña's public identity had been that of a millionaire, he had in fact "nothing in his name." The couple could not come to any agreement at the first hearing, after which Jelinek told the press that Fariña was a "pathological liar" and "psychopath." A second divorce hearing was held on September 30. In late September came reports that Fariña was involved with Uruguayan model Mónica Farro and that model Magali Mora was expecting his child. On 1 December Fariña tweeted a picture of him and his new fiancée, Macarena Perez, writing that they were "so happy." The divorce from Jelinek was finalized in February 2014.

== Vehicles ==
On 27 November 2013, Fariña was involved in a near-accident in the Palermo neighbourhood of Buenos Aires and was taken into police custody after the police ascertained that the BMW he was driving was not the same one for which he presented ownership documents. Fariña's lawyer, Rodolfo Baqué, told reporters that the vehicle belonged to a friend. The friend turned out to be Juan Ignacio Suris, who in December was charged with being the head of a drug-smuggling gang and arrested in January 2014.

In January 2014, shortly after marrying Macarena Perez, Fariña was again detained by the police for driving a vehicle, this time an Audi, for which he did not have the proper papers. Shortly thereafter, authorities ascertained that Fariña had not paid taxes on the car and that his summer home in Pinamar, in another apparent tax dodge, was officially listed as vacant land. The car was seized so that authorities could auction it to cover a portion of Fariña's tax debt. In March 2014, Federico Holjevac, son of a Croatian businessman who was under investigation for fraud, claimed ownership of an impounded Ferrari that he said he had bought from Fariña and that, the FIU believed, had perhaps been transferred as part of a money-laundering operation. La Nación reported on 10 March 2014, that the FIU had submitted reports to Casanello outlining Fariña's possession of luxury items registered in other people's names in order to avoid taxes. The FIU was also looking into the question of whether business activities by Suris were connected to money laundering by Fariña.

== Arrest and pre-trial detention ==
On 25 March, by order of Judge Manuel Blanco of La Plata, Fariña was arrested for tax evasion in a hotel in the Palermo section of Buenos Aires. La Nación reported on 30 March that the Fariña scandal was "expanding and branching off." On 9 April, the newspaper reported an 22 October 2013 phone call in which Fariña proposed transferring $90 million from a bank in Portugal to Central America via Liechtenstein and other countries.

On 11 April 2014, Blanco indicted Fariña on charges of tax evasion and aggravated fraudulent fiscal insolvency. Blanco stated that the court had gathered ample evidence to support the charges. The "courtroom walls," stated La Nación in April 2014, were "closing in on Fariña." In May, Casanello indicted Fariña and Elaskar for money laundering related to Báez's operations. Fariña was accused of laundering 35 million pesos (US$4.2 million). Casanello seized Fariña's residence at Avenida del Libertador as well as several cars, property in Mendoza, and shares in three firms.

In a May 2014 police operation against a drug gang, a BMW belonging to Fariña was confiscated along with large amounts of marijuana and cocaine. Also in May, Blanco refused for the second time to release Fariña from jail; in June, the Federal Court of Appeals of La Plata, consisting of judges Carlos Nogueira, Antonio Pacilio, and Carlos Vallefín gave its approval to Fariña's continued pre-trial detention.
