= Freddy Balsera =

American political consultant

Alfredo J. Balsera
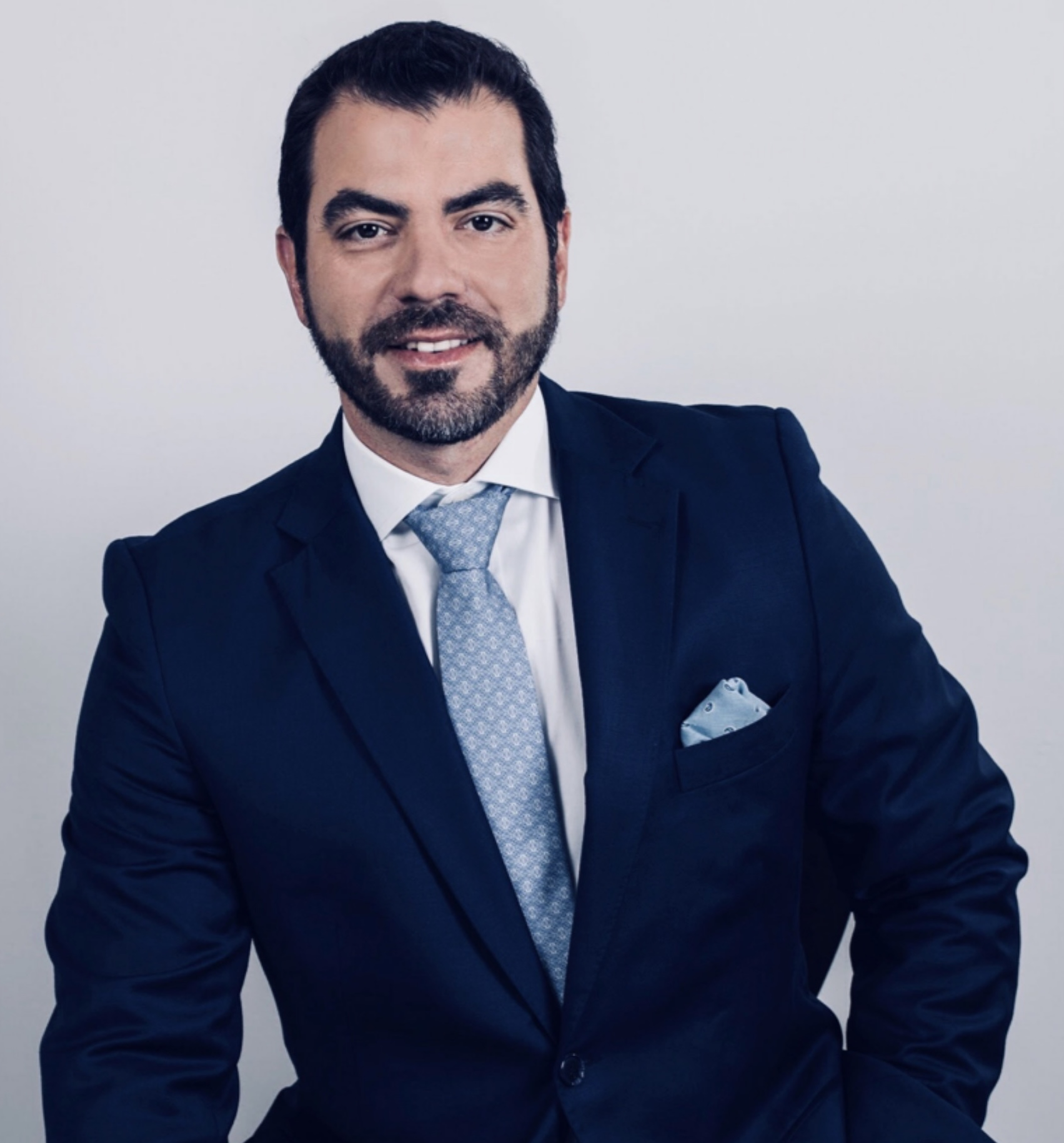
- Balsera in 2021
- Born: Miami, Florida, U.S.
- Other name: Freddy Balsera
- Education: South Miami High School; Barry University
- Occupations: Political consultant, public affairs executive
- Years active: 1995–present
- Known for: Hispanic media advisor to Barack Obama’s 2008

Alfredo J. "Freddy" Balsera is an American political consultant who was the founder of Balsera Communications, who served as Hispanic Media Advisor for Barack Obama during the latter's presidential campaigns in 2008 and 2012 as well as other Democratic party campaigns.

== Early life and education ==
Balsera was born in Miami. He graduated from South Miami High School. After graduating high school he went on to attend Barry University.

== Career ==
Balsera started his career as Alex Penelas' finance manager during the latter's mayoral campaign in 1995. When Penelas won the race for mayor of Miami-Dade County, Balsera was appointed Mayor's Aide for Intergovernmental and Political Affairs. He went on to become Staff Director for the Mayor's Marketing Council in 1997. After having served Penelas during his first four-year term, Balsera went into the private sector and founded Balsera Communications in 1999. Balsera Communications is a national public affairs and strategic communications firm specializing in reputation management, strategic communications, environmental issues, grassroots engagement, digital strategy, and media relations.

After establishing himself and his company in the field of public affairs and public relations, Balsera was chosen to serve as Hispanic Media Advisor for Barack Obama’s 2008 presidential run and again in 2012 after having crafted the President’s Hispanic messaging in 2008. He was a member of Obama’s National Finance Committee during both elections and was appointed Presidential Elector in Florida in 2008. He served on the Obama-Biden presidential transition team and as an advisor to the agency review team for the Federal Communications Commission. After winning the presidential race in 2012, Obama nominated Balsera to serve on the US Advisory Commission on Public Diplomacy in 2013. During Hillary Clinton's presidential run in 2016, Balsera was chosen to be a board member of Correct the Record, the SuperPAC working in favor of Hillary Clinton’s nomination and was also a member of the Hillary for America’s Florida Leadership Council.

In this capacity, he co-wrote and produced all of the Spanish media messages broadcast by the Obama campaign nationally. His work delivered an estimated 67% of the national Hispanic vote for President Obama in 2008. Additionally, Freddy Balsera served on the Obama National Finance Committee during both elections and was appointed as a Presidential Elector in Florida in 2008. He is also well known for his work helping Democrats get elected in local and federal political contests in the state of Florida.

Aside from running Balsera Communications, Freddy Balsera is also a Political Analyst for Telemundo Network and a frequent commentator on the local radio show “Panorama Nacional” on Actualidad Radio as well as Univision Noticias and other national and international media.

== Philanthropy ==
Balsera sits on the state-wide board of directors for Prospera, an economic development, nonprofit organization specialized in providing bilingual assistance to Hispanic entrepreneurs. He also sits on the at-large board for the Greater Miami Chamber of Commerce,

== Personal life ==
In 2014, Balsera married journalist Gloria Ordáz, who co-anchors weekday editions of Noticiero Telemundo 51. In September 2014, their home in Coral Gables, Florida was burglarized. He has four children named AJ, Jack, Diego and Sebastian.
