= Karina Jelinek =

Argentine model (born 1981)

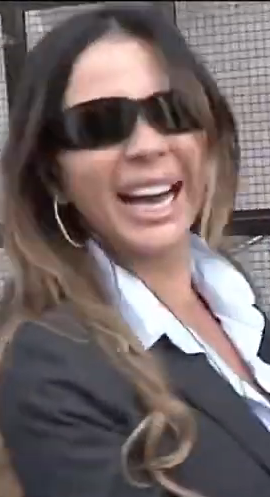
- Jelinek in 2025
- Born: Olga Karina Jelinek; 22 March 1981 (age 45); Villa María, Córdoba, Argentina
- Occupations: Model; actress; television personality
- Spouse: Leonardo Fariña (m. 2011; div. 2013)

Olga Karina Jelinek (born 22 March 1981) is an Argentine model, actress and television personality.

== Biography ==
Jelinek was born on 22 March 1981 in Villa María, Córdoba. She began to work as model at the age of 16, and became the Miss Córdoba Province and the Miss Villa Carlos Paz. At the age of 19, she moved to Buenos Aires, and began participating in fashion shows, advertising campaigns and television shows. She has appeared for magazines Maxim and H Para Hombres and other media. In 2004, she participated in the entertainment TV program No hay 2 sin 3.

In 2005, she took part in the dance competition Bailando por un sueño, a segment of the television program Showmatch in the Argentina broadcast El Trece.

After a courtship of three months she married Leonardo Fariña on 28 April 2011 in the Tattersall hotel in the Palermo district of Buenos Aires.

In 2012, she again took part in the Bailando por un sueño competition. In 2013, the name of her husband Fariña appeared in the media in relation to a clandestine recording of him reportedly speaking of money laundering. In May of that year they stopped living together.

In 2020, Jelinek became a contestant in the renewed version of Cantando por un sueño. In August 2020, Jelinek revealed she is in a relationship with model Florencia Parise, and stated she feels attraction for both men and women, saying "I can't choose with whom I fall in love".

== Filmography ==
=== Film ===
| Year | Title | Role | Notes |
|---|---|---|---|
| 2012 | El vagoneta en el mundo del cine | | |
| 2014 | Bañeros 4: los rompeolas | Karina | |
| 2015 | Locos sueltos en el zoo | Bárbara | |

=== Television ===
| Year | Title | Role | Notes |
|---|---|---|---|
| 2002 | Son amores | Rosaura | |
| 2004 | No hay 2 sin 3 | | |
| 2006 | SQP | | |
| 2010 | Viviana Canosa | | |
| 2011 | El desfile del show | | |
| 2013 | Solamente vos | Carola | |
| 2014 | Nosotros al mediodía | | |
| 2016 | La peluquería de Don Mateo | Licenciada Olga | |

Reality shows
| Year | Title | Role | Notes |
|---|---|---|---|
| 2006 | Bailando por un Sueño (Argentine season 3) | Contestant | 13th |
| 2007 | Cantando por un sueño 2007 | Contestant | 3rd |
| 2008 | Bailando por un Sueño 2008 | Contestant | 18th |
| 2012 | Bailando 2012 | Contestant by replacement | |
| 2012 | Bailando 2012 | Contestant | 16th |
| 2014 | Bailando 2014 | Contestant | 22nd |
| 2020 | Divina comida | Contestant/Host | 3rd |
| 2020 | Cantando 2020 | Contestant | 31st |
| 2022 | El hotel de los famosos season 1 | V.I.P Guest | 2 episodes |
| 2024 | Bake Off Famosos Argentina | Contestant | 14th |
