= José María Campagnoli =

Argentine prosecutor

- Occupation: prosecutor

José María Campagnoli is an Argentine prosecutor. He worked in the political scandal of The Route of the K-Money. He was suspended from his functions in December 2013, having been found guilty of ″abuse of authority″ and ″malfeasance″ in his acting on such case. In July 2014 he was restored as prosecutor, while the trial against him continued.
