= Periodismo para todos =

- This picture shows Jorge Lanata making a one-finger salute in an episode of this program. The logo of the program is at the bottom left corner.
- Also known as: PPT (acronym); Journalism for everybody (English)
- Genre: investigative journalism
- Directed by: Luis Barros
- Presented by: Jorge Lanata
- Starring: Jorge Lanata
- Opening theme: "Fuck You"
- Composers: Lily Allen, Greg Kurstin (open theme)
- Country of origin: Argentina
- Original language: Spanish
- No. of seasons: 12
- No. of episodes: 266

Production
- Executive producers: Tamara Florin; Andrea Rodríguez
- Producer: Ricardo Ravanelli
- Running time: 120 minutes

Original release
- Network: eltrece
- Release: April 15, 2012 – November 26, 2023

Periodismo para todos (Spanish: Journalism for everybody) is an Argentine investigative journalism television program. It was hosted by the journalist Jorge Lanata, it aired on Sunday nights in eltrece. It was highly critical during the Cristina Fernández de Kirchner presidency. In 2013, it won several Martín Fierro Awards including best news television program and best journalistic work for Jorge Lanata. During Fernández de Kirchner's presidency, it was censored in several provinces of Argentina with governors aligned with the president: Tucumán, Formosa Mendoza and Río Negro.

== Description ==
The television program opens with a "humorous" stand-up comedy, where Lanata comments on the political events of the week with jokes. These stand-ups are included as an homage to Tato Bores, who made similar monologues in his television programs, which were also aired on Sunday nights. The stand-ups feature a parody of the president Cristina Fernández de Kirchner, made by the humorist Fátima Florez. The high success of the parody made by Florez was pointed by the magazine Noticias, which placed her on the main page.

The theme song is "Fuck You", by Lily Allen. It was chosen to redress it after it was used in a telenovela of the state-owned TV Pública, in a poor Spanish translation. The opening features photos of the audience making the middle finger, which soon became the icon of the program.

The program was redesigned in 2020, as a result of the COVID-19 pandemic in Argentina. The program did away with the live audience and the big setting, and featured just Lanata alone in a desk. The program was now called "PPT Box", and the intro and outro sequences make the visual effect of Lanata being inside a giant box.

== Investigations ==
Most investigations made by Periodismo para todos generated political controversy. The first airing, on April 15, 2012, made an extensive investigation of the Boudougate, the scandal about the vice president Amado Boudou. Lanata made an interview with Carlos Raúl Schneider, who is registered as the head of "Tierras International Investments CV" a firm associated to "The Old Fund", led by Alejandro Vandenbroele, which invested million in Ciccone Calcográfica. Schneider is actually a poor pensioner, who was not even aware of the business involving him, who signed papers without reading them and became a victim of identity theft.

Lanata made a report of the social and political conditions of the Tucumán Province, ruled by José Alperovich. He detailed the poor social conditions of the people and the wealth of the Alperovich family, which controls the three powers and all political institutions in Tucumán. As the program is censored in Tucumán, Lanata sought to present it live with public of the province. Alperovich did not allow that either, so the program was presented live from a house of social welfare.

== Censorship ==
Periodismo para todos was censored in several provinces with governors aligned with the president. It is censored in Tucumán, and not available in public broadcasting (El Trece is a public channel). The program that criticized governor Alperovich was followed by demonstrations against the censorship, during a speech of the ministry of education.

The program is not available either for public broadcasting in the Formosa Province. Lanata denounced political corruption, abuses against the indigenous peoples and electoral fraud in the government of Gildo Insfrán; the website of El Trece was hacked during the airing of the program.

El Trece has a repeater channel in Río Negro, which shows all the programs of the network, with the sole exception of Periodismo para todos. The governor Alberto Weretilneck proposed Lanata to hold a public debate about the censorship, but Lanata refused. "Censorship is not debated, it is denounced. Show the program first, and then I will debate whatever you want", he said the following week.

The program has also been censored in Mendoza. It has been also reported that TV signal uses to drop down just by the time Periodismo Para Todos is on air. Interruptions, interference and other technical issues during the program are often experienced in some cities in the Province of Córdoba on Sundays nights when Periodismo Para Todos is broadcasting live.

== Audience ==
Periodismo para todos seasons
Season	Episodes	Season premiere	Season finale	Time slot (UTC−3)	Rating	Original network	Other networks
Season	Episodes	Season premiere	Season finale	Time slot (UTC−3)	Kantar Ibope	Original network	Other networks
1st	35	April 15, 2012	December 15, 2012	11:00 pm	15.7	eltrece	—
2nd	34	April 14, 2013	December 8, 2013	10:00 pm	17.5	eltrece	USA; Canal Sur
3rd	32	April 13, 2014	November 30, 2014	10:00 pm	14.4	eltrece	USA; Canal Sur
4th	23	May 31, 2015	November 29, 2015	10:00 pm	16.4	eltrece	USA; Canal Sur
«El K-Jero» (TV-special)	1	March 20, 2016		10:00 pm	19.6	eltrece	USA; Canal Sur
5th	23	July 3, 2016	November 27, 2016	10:00 pm	14.5	eltrece	USA; Canal Sur

== Awards ==
- 2012 Martín Fierro Awards
  - Best journalism program
  - Best male journalist (Jorge Lanata)
  - Best humoristic work (Fátima Florez)
- 2013 Tato Awards
  - Program of the year
  - Best journalist hosting (Jorge Lanata)
  - Best direction in non-fiction (Luis Barros)
  - Best production in non-fiction
  - Best journalist program
- 2013 Fund TV Awards
  - Current politics Journalism Program (Programa Periodístico de Actualidad política)
  - Extraordinary Award (selected among the winners by the jury )
- 2013 Martín Fierro Awards
  - Best journalism program
- 2014 Fund TV Awards
  - Opinion Journalism Program (Programa Periodístico de Opinión)
- 2014 New York Festivals - World's Best TV and Films Awards
  - Silver World Medal, competition "Television - News: Reports/Features" category "Investigative Report"
- 2015 Martín Fierro Awards
  - Golden Martín Fierro Award for Jorge Lanata
  - Best journalist program
  - Best male journalist (Jorge Lanata)

=== Nominations ===
- 2013 Martín Fierro Awards
  - Best production
  - Best female journalist (Luciana Geuna)
  - Best male journalist (Jorge Lanata)
- 2014 42ND INTERNATIONAL EMMY AWARDS
  - CURRENT AFFAIRS (Journalism for All - The Route of the K-Money)

== See also ==
- The K money trail
