= Lázaro Báez =

Argentine businessman

- Born: 11 February 1951 (age 75); Corrientes, Argentina
- Criminal charges: Money laundering
- Criminal penalty: 12 years in prison 6 years in prison

Lázaro Báez (born 11 February 1951) is an Argentine businessman. Báez is a central figure in the corruption scandal known as The Route of the K-Money, surrounding former Argentine presidents Néstor Kirchner and Cristina Fernández de Kirchner; the case was also known as Lázarogate.

Báez became a friend of Kirchner in 1991, and in 2003 founded a construction company, Austral Construcciones, which was awarded many government contracts during Kirchner's presidency. In 2011 Báez built Kirchner's mausoleum. He has been called "the main beneficiary of public works in Patagonia".

In custody since 2016, in 2021 he was sentenced to 12 years in prison for money laundering. In December 2022, he was sentenced to six years in prison for an unlawful business partnership with former Argentine president Cristina Fernández de Kirchner while she was in office.

== Early life and education ==
Báez was born in 1951 in San Luis del Palmar, Corrientes, Argentina, to a family of Peronists. His family moved to Río Gallegos, Santa Cruz, in Patagonia, in 1962. The move was reportedly caused by political persecution, his father having apparently had to leave his home province following the coup against President Arturo Frondizi.

In 1984 he married Norma Beatriz Calismonte, who worked as tutor assistant in a public secondary school.

== Career ==
=== Bank jobs ===
After completing high school, in 1980, he began his first job, as an office junior at a local branch of a National Bank. He then served as a sergeant in the army. In 1985, he started working at his second job, as a teller at the provincial state Bank of Santa Cruz. In 1990 he established a relationship with Néstor Kirchner by means of leaked bank accounts data Báez offered to Kirchner. Kirchner was at the time serving his last year as mayor of Río Gallegos and beginning a crucial campaign for governor, a position he would end up holding from 1991 to 2003. Báez then became bank assistant manager.

=== Austral Construcciones ===
Báez formed Austral Construcciones S.A. in 2003, and within three months the firm's capital rose from $AR12,000 to $AR500,000. Former Santa Cruz prosecutor Andrés Vivanco said in May 2013 that Báez "was previously just a bank employee who has no legal way of justifying his increased fortune... Everything Lázaro Báez has come from Néstor Kirchner. He previously had nothing; he was not an entrepreneur because he never risked his capital, he would always just wait to submit a public tender with the government".

Beginning in 2005, Austral and other firms owned by Báez were awarded the majority of the contracts offered by the province of Santa Cruz during the presidency of Néstor Kirchner and 12% of the contracts awarded by the Ministry of Planning under Minister Julio de Vido. Over a five-year period, the firm received 4 billion dollars in federal contracts and 1.2 billion dollars in contracts for the province of Santa Cruz. His firm Southern Building was investigated in Liechtenstein for money laundering.

== Other business activities ==
After 2006, Báez began to buy properties along the Santa Cruz River. He ultimately paid more than $28 million for 10 properties totaling 200,000 acres. Later he contracted with Kirchner to construct the Cóndor Cliff-La Barrancosa Dams which would flood those lands. One commentator wrote in 2012 that Báez had plainly purchased the properties knowing that they would be made valuable by the dam project. "In any serious country this would be called the use of privileged information, influence peddling, [and] corruption."

According to a 2009 report, Báez constructed a luxury building on Kirchner-owned land in Rio Gallegos. The structure was completed in 2007.

Báez built himself a mansion outside of Rio Gallegos. In recent years he has expanded his interests into the oil business and properties along the Santa Cruz River.

Báez also owns the oil firms Misahar SA and Epsur SA, and the newspaper Prensa Libre in Rio Gallegos.

He has two sons, Martín Antonio Báez and Leandro Martín Báez. The former, who has his own mansion in Rio Gallegos, is considered Báez's likely successor as head of his empire.

=== 2007 tax investigation ===
On August 17, 2007, the Deputy Director of Research of the General Tax Directorate (DGI), Jaime Mecikovsky, completed an elaborate three-year investigation of public works contractors and concluded that Austral had issued false invoices.

== Relationship with Kirchner ==
In April 2013, Deputy Francisco De Narváez called Báez "a person of great intimacy with the Kirchner family." Kirchner reportedly ate his last dinner with Báez and with the two men's wives. It was Báez, moreover, who built Kirchner's massive mausoleum in the Rio Gallegos Cemetery. In late December 2013 it was reported that the mausoleum had sustained structural damage, owing to its monumental weight, and that Báez had visited the site personally to inspect the damage.

== Jorge Lanata program ==
On April 14, 2013, journalist Jorge Lanata of Periodismo para todos ("Periodismo para todos"), a news program aired on Argentina's Channel 13, presented a report entitled "La ruta del dinero K" ("The K Money Trail"), with "K" standing for the late Argentinian president Néstor Kirchner. Lanata's report included a videotaped testimony by financier Federico Elaskar and a hidden-camera recording of businessman Leonardo Fariña in which these men described large-scale illegal financial manipulations by members of the Kirchner circle, including Báez, that involved the transfer of about 55 million euros over a six-month period to Switzerland and other foreign tax havens. The men indicated that Kirchner himself was directly involved in these maneuvers.

Allegedly, at Báez's direction, Fariña orchestrated a plan whereby the funds were sent abroad via Elaskar's financial firm, SGI. More than fifty companies were purportedly created with the express purpose of facilitating these transfers. Also supposedly involved in this scheme was Fabián Rossi, who was said to have funneled the money through Panama banks. According to Elaskar, silver from Patagonia was shipped to Switzerland by way of Montevideo, Uruguay.

Asked on hidden camera whether Báez was an associate of Kirchner's, Fariña said yes, and added that "in politics there are no front men, only operators." Elaskar said that he had been cheated and threatened with death by business associates of Báez. Elaskar also said that both of Báez's sons had been involved in the offshore firms to which funds had been illegally transferred. Martin Báez runs Teegan, a firm founded in Panama and based in the tax haven of Belize.

== Later interviews ==
In a subsequent interview with Rolando Graña on América Noticias, however, Elaskar claimed that there had been no money laundering or death threats, and that everything he had said on Lanata's program was untrue. "I lied. I apologize," he said. He maintained that he had lied because he was "angry" and "young" Fariña, in an interview with Jorge Rial of Intrusos (Intruders), also claimed to have been lying in the videotape aired on Lanata's program. Fariña said that he apologized to Báez, whom he called "a first-rate guy."

Lanata replied to these claims by saying that Fariña was "not the brain" of the operation and that on his next show he would provide evidence Báez was the real mastermind. In an early May interview with Lanata, Kirchner's former secretary, Míriam Quiroga, confirmed some of the charges made by Fariña and Elaskar about Báez, saying that at the Casa Rosada, during Kirchner's presidency, she had seen bags, apparently containing money, that were sent to the Kirchners' mansion in Santa Cruz province, where they were placed in a vault, the money later presumably finding its way to bank accounts in Switzerland, Panama, and Belize.

== Legal case ==
After the Lanata program was aired, several opposition legislators called on public prosecutor Carlos Gonella to investigate the accusations against Báez. They also called for the freezing of Báez's assets.

A judicial investigation of Báez on charges of money laundering, conspiracy, and cover-up was initiated on April 17. Martín Irurzun of the Federal Court appointed Sebastián Casanello as the judge in the case.

On the same date, and again in early May, raids were carried out on SGI's offices at "La Rosadita" by la Policía de Seguridad Aeroportuaria (Airport Security Police, PSA) on the orders of Casanello. In early June, Báez's possessions and safety boxes were raided by the National Gendarmerie, also on Casanello's orders. Báez was described as being "visibly upset" by the raids, which he described as "unnecessary show."

Other persons charged in the case included Elaskar, Fariña, Rossi, Báez's son Leandro Martín Báez, and Daniel Perez Gadin.

On May 3, after Elaskar and Fariña had already been charged, federal prosecutor William Marijuan filed money laundering charges against Báez.

It was reported in early May that Báez had made some of the suspicious land purchases through three of his companies: Austral Construcciones, Austral Agro, and Valle Hermoso.

Judge Casanello called Lárazo Báez for inquiry in 2016. He took a plane with unknown destination, so the judge ordered his detention, fearing an attempt to escape.

=== Báez lawsuits against Elaskar and Farina ===
It was reported on May 5 that Báez was suing Elaskar and Fariña for the statements they had made about him on Lanata's program. Báez called the accusations part of "a smear campaign...with a clear political agenda." On May 22, Báez said that he had never worked with Fariña, and that Fariña had, rather, worked for the firm Pluscarga, which did business with Báez's businesses. He also denied any involvement in money laundering or any business relationship with Kirchner.

Báez's lawsuit against Fariña and his wife, Karina Jelinek, on charges of slander was dismissed in early July by judge Raúl García.

=== Further revelations ===
In December 2013, the Argentinian newspaper La Nacion reported that seven Báez companies had signed documents agreeing to rent 935 rooms a month at the Alto Calafate Hotel throughout 2010 and 2011, whether or not they were occupied. regardless of whether in fact employees were staying there. La Nacion additionally revealed that Báez had paid at least $3.2 million to Kirchner in "rent" for Las Dunas, an inn in El Calafate, and that he had paid a total of $14.5 million in "rent" for the two hotels, plus the La Aldea Hotel, during 2010 and 2011, even as Báez was receiving large sums from the federal government for public works projects.

It also emerged in December 2013 that Báez, during the previous ten years, in Santa Cruz alone, had purchased tracts of land amounting to at least 263,000 hectares, or 13 times the size of the Federal District.

=== Injunction request ===
Also in December 2013, Báez asked for an injunction that would prohibit the media from publishing anything about his business or personal ties to Kirchner. This request was rejected by El Foro de Periodismo Argentino (Argentine Journalism Forum, FOPEA) and the Asociación de Entidades Periodísticas Argentinas (Association of Argentine Journalism Entities, ADEPA), the latter of which called the idea unconstitutional. Reacting to Báez's request, Parliament member Margarita Stolbizer described him as a "mobster" while Labor Party leader Gabriel Solano described the use of "prior censorship to defend the 'confidentiality' of the business activities of Lázaro Báez" as undemocratic.

=== December 2013 raid ===
On the orders of tax court judge Javier López Biscayart, who was investigating Báez on charges of tax evasion and money laundering, the Argentinian federal police raided the offices of Austral Construcciones in Buenos Aires in late December 2013.

=== Security measures ===
In January 2014, it was reported that Báez traveled with such a level of security that it was "as if he were the President of the United States in a war zone."

=== Swiss investigation ===
It was reported in August 2013 that the investigation of Báez's financial dealings in Switzerland was stalled because that country's Department of Justice was refusing to release information about Swiss bank accounts held in the name of one of Báez's sons.

The Swiss ambassador to Argentina, Johannes Matyassy, said in January 2014 that a criminal investigation into Báez's financial activities in Switzerland was progressing. Matyassy said that this was the first case in which Switzerland and Argentina had collaborated in such a manner under a new cooperative agreement.

=== Uruguayan investigation ===
It was reported in late January 2014 that a Uruguayan investigation into the money laundering charges against Báez had not progressed, owing to the failure of Argentinian authorities to cooperate with the investigation.
