= Legislature of Río Negro =

Legislative body of Río Negro Province, Argentina

Type
- Type: Unicameral

Leadership
- President (Vice Governor): Alejandro Palmieri (JSRN) since 10 December 2019
- First Vice President: Julia Elena Fernández (JSRN) since 10 December 2019
- Second Vice President: Humberto Alejandro Marinao (FDT) since 10 December 2019

Structure
- Seats: 46 legislators
- Political groups: Government (28): Together We Are Río Negro (28); Opposition (18): Front of All (14); Renewal Front (3); Together for Change (1)
- Length of term: 4 years
- Authority: Constitution of Río Negro

Elections
- Voting system: Parallel voting
- Last election: 7 April 2019
- Next election: 2023

Website
- web.legisrn.gov.ar

The Legislature of Río Negro Province (Spanish: Legislatura de la Provincia de Río Negro) is the unicameral legislative body of Río Negro Province, in Argentina. It convenes in the provincial capital, Viedma.

It comprises 46 legislators, 22 of whom are elected in a single province-wide multi-member district, while the remaining 24 are elected in eight three-member districts that divide the province's territory, called "electoral circuits" (circuitos electorales). Its powers and responsibilities are established in the provincial constitution.

Elections to the legislature take place every four years, when the entirety of its members are renewed. The legislature is presided by the Vice Governor of Río Negro, who is elected alongside the governor every four years.

== History ==
The Legislature was established in 1958, when the National Territory of Río Negro became a province of Argentina. The first legislature convened in the old building of the Teatro Argentino, in Viedma. In 1972, the military governor, Roberto Requeijo, ordered a series of renovations to better accommodate the legislature in the site of the Teatro Argentino.

== Electoral districts ==
Legislators in both the province-wide district and the eight electoral circuits are elected through proportional representation using party-list proportional representation, with D'Hondt system and a 5% electoral threshold. The electoral circuits do not correspond to the province's departments, but are rather divided using municipalities as its main criterion.

The electoral circuits were first introduced ahead of the 1958 provincial elections, originally comprising six districts. The current distribution was established in 2013, when the electoral law was last modified.

Electoral Circuit	Municipalities	Map
Alto Valle Oeste	Cipolletti; Las Perlas; General Fernández Oro; Cinco Saltos; Contralmirante Cordero; Campo Grande; Catriel; Peñas Blancas	
Alto Valle Centro	Cervantes; General Roca; Allen; El Cuy; Lonco Vaca; Mencué; Cerro Policía	
Alto Valle Este	Chichinales; Villa Regina; General Enrique Godoy; Ingeniero Luis A. Huergo; Mainqué; Valle Azul	
Valle Medio	All of Avellaneda Department; All of Pichi Mahuida Department	
Valle Inferior	All of Adolfo Alsina Department; All of Conesa Department	
Andino	All of Bariloche Department; All of Ñorquincó Department; All of Pilcaniyeu Department	
Serrano/Línea Sur	All of 9 de Julio Department; All of 25 de Mayo Department; Does not include Cona Niyeu	
Atlántico	All of San Antonio Department; All of Valcheta Department; Cona Niyeu	
