= Nueve de Julio Department, Río Negro =

Nueve de Julio Departamento Nueve de Julio
- Department
- Location of Nueve de Julio
- Coordinates: 40°36′00″S 67°47′00″W
- Country: Argentina
- Province: Río Negro Province
- Seat: Sierra Colorada

Area
  - Total: 25,597 km^{2} (9,883 sq mi)

Population (2022)
  - Total: 3,719
  - Density: 0.1453/km^{2} (0.3763/sq mi)

Nueve de Julio is a department of the province of Río Negro (Argentina).

== Municipalities ==
- Comicó
- Cona Niyeu
- Ministro Ramos Mexía
- Prahuaniyeu
- Treneta
- Sierra Colorada
- Yaminué
