= Clemente Onelli, Río Negro =

Coordinates: 41°14′S 70°01′W

Clemente Onelli
- Municipality and village
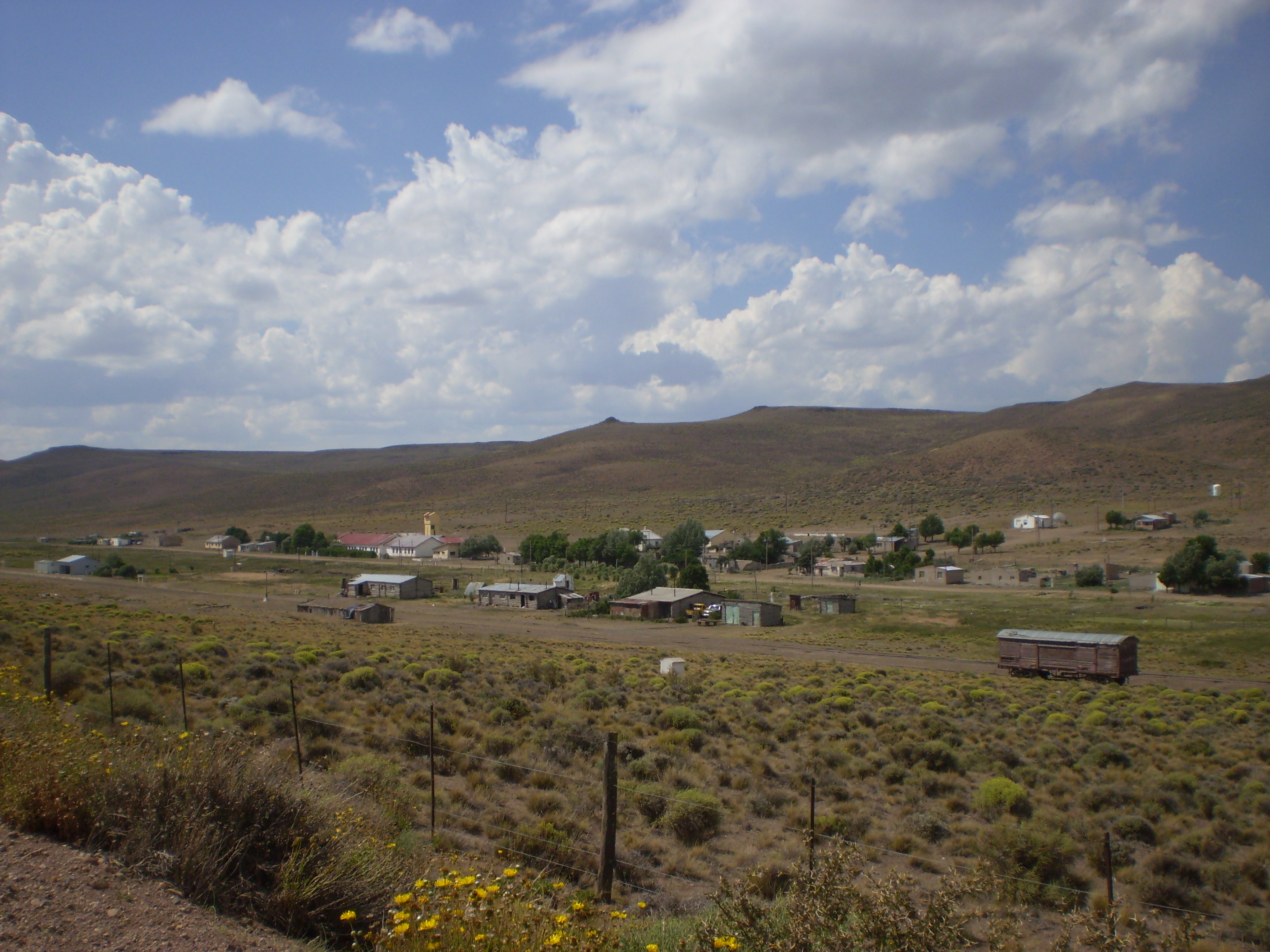
- Interactive map of Clemente Onelli
- Country: Argentina
- Province: Río Negro Province
- Department: Veinticinco de Mayo

Population (2010)
  - Total: 114
- Time zone: UTC−3 (ART)
- Climate: Csb

Clemente Onelli is a village and municipality in Río Negro Province, in Argentina. It is located in the Veinticinco de Mayo Department, some 50 kilometers west from Ingeniero Jacobacci. As of 2010, it counted with 114 inhabitants.

Named after Italian-born naturalist Clemente Onelli, the town largely subsisted on cattle raising up until the 1990s. It is located on Ruta Nacional 23 and served by the Tren Patagónico, which has a station located in the village. The closure of the Tren Patagónico railway from 1990 up until 2014 severely affected the town, which saw a pronounced population decrease.

The town is located on a relatively high steppe (1000 metres, or just over 3000 feet) and is noted for low winter nighttime temperatures: although no climate stations exist nearby, there are reports of temperature below -30°C or -22°F. The closest city, lower-altitude Maquinchao, has reported -25.6°C or -14°F. In normal winter cold waves, temperatures frequently fall below -18°C or 0°F.

The town has a single school, Escuela Hogar 104.
