= Conesa =

Conesa can refer to:

== Places ==
- Conesa, Spain, municipality in Cuenca de Barberá, Tarragona, Spain
- Conesa, Buenos Aires, town in San Nicolás Partido, Buenos Aires Province, Argentina
- General Conesa, Buenos Aires, town in Tordillo, Buenos Aires Province, Argentina
- Conesa Department, Río Negro, Argentina
- General Conesa, Río Negro, capital of Conesa Department

== People ==
- Abril Conesa (born 2000), Spanish synchronised swimmer
- Andrés Conesa (born 1969), Mexican businessman, CEO of the airline Aeroméxico
- Anna Conesa (born 2003), French footballer
- Carmen Conesa (born 1960), Spanish actress
- Diego Conesa (born 1963), Spanish politician
- Emilio Conesa (1821-1873), Argentine military figure, after whom the listed localities in Argentina are named
- María Conesa (1892–1978), Spanish and Mexican actress and vedette, also known as La Gatita Blanca (The White Kitten)
