= Alamitosphenos =

Alamitosphenos Temporal range: Late Cretaceous, Maastrichtian
- Reconstructed mandible depicting the placement of the holotype

Scientific classification
- Kingdom: Animalia
- Phylum: Chordata
- Class: Reptilia
- Order: Rhynchocephalia
- Clade: †Opisthodontia
- Genus: †Alamitosphenos; Agnolín et al., 2024
- Species: †A. mineri

Binomial name
- †Alamitosphenos mineri Agnolín et al., 2024

Extinct reptile genus

Alamitosphenos (lit. 'Los Alamitos wedge') is an extinct genus of sphenodontid reptile in the clade Opisthodontia known from the Late Cretaceous (Maastrichtian age) Los Alamitos Formation of Argentina. The genus contains a single species, Alamitosphenos mineri, known from a fragment of the lower jaw. This bone has small teeth toward the front, followed by a thin ridge and a robust symphyseal region forming a downward-projecting 'chin'.

== Discovery and naming ==
A. mineri type locality (Nueva Poupée Farm) in Río Negro Province, Argentina

The Alamitosphenos fossil material was discovered by Santiago Miner at Nueva Poupée Farm (previously called the Los Alamitos Farm), a site with outcrops of the upper Los Alamitos Formation, about 60 kilometres (37 mi) away from Arroyo de La Ventana in Río Negro Province, Argentina. The specimen is accessioned at the Museo Provincial "María Inés Kopp" as specimen MPMIK 1759/p/23. It consists of a fragment of the symphyseal end of the left dentary (lower jaw bone), preserving three small teeth.

In 2024, Federico Agnolín and colleagues described Alamitosphenos mineri as a new genus and species of derived sphenodontian based on these fossil remains, designating MPMIK 1759/p/23 as the holotype specimen. The generic name, Alamitosphenos, combines a reference to Los Alamitos Farm, the original name of the locality from which the fossil was collected (and the name of the geologic formation outcropping there), with the Greek word σφήν (sphḗn), meaning 'wedge'. This suffix alludes to the only living sphenodontian, the tuatara—which bears the genus name Sphenodon (lit. 'wedge tooth')—and its fossil relatives. The specific name, mineri, honors Santiago Miner, the crew member who found the holotype.

== Description ==
The A. mineri holotype specimen preserves three very small teeth, likely representing the hatchling teeth retained at the front of the jaw from the animal's earlier ontogenetic stages. In cross-section, these teeth have a subquadrangular base. Anterior to these teeth (toward the tip of the jaw), the dorsal surface of the dentary forms a thin ridge directed downward. The dentary symphysis is robust, forming a ventrally (downward)-projecting 'chin'. The symphysis itself is ovoidal and obliquely split by a deep groove.

The general shape of the front of the dentary and the presence of a symphyseal groove are superficially similar to Diphydontosaurus and Gephyrosaurus, two early-diverging non-sphenodontid rhynchocephalians. Nonetheless, Alamitosphenos is regarded as a medium-sized member of the more derived sphenodontid clade Opisthodontia, which is the sister group to Sphenodontinae, the clade containing the modern tuatara. An opisthodontian identity is supported by the square-shaped bases of the teeth. Eilenodontinae, a subfamily of opisthodontians, is characterized by transversely expanded teeth that are closely packed, features not seen in Alamitosphenos. Kawasphenodon, the only other named sphenodontian from the Los Alamitos Formation, has a dorsally-curved dentary with a long, edentulous anterior region, contrasting with the condition in Alamitosphenos, which has teeth in the anterior dentary and no observable dorsal curvature.

== Paleoenvironment ==
Alamitosphenos is known from the Los Alamitos Formation, which dates to the Maastrichtian age of the late Cretaceous period. This formation has yielded a diverse assemblage of vertebrate fossils. The herpetofauna includes Kawasphenodon (a fellow sphenodontid), madtsoiid snakes, chelid turtles and meiolaniid stem-turtles, and frogs in the clades Pipoidea and Calyptocephalellidae. Many mammals are known, including several meridiolestidans and gondwanatherians. Other animals include the bird Alamitornis (a possible patagopterygiform) and the non-avian dinosaurs Aeolosaurus (a titanosaurian sauropod) and Huallasaurus (a hadrosaurid ornithopod).
