= Aguada de Guerra =

Coordinates: 41°04′S 68°25′W

- Municipality and village
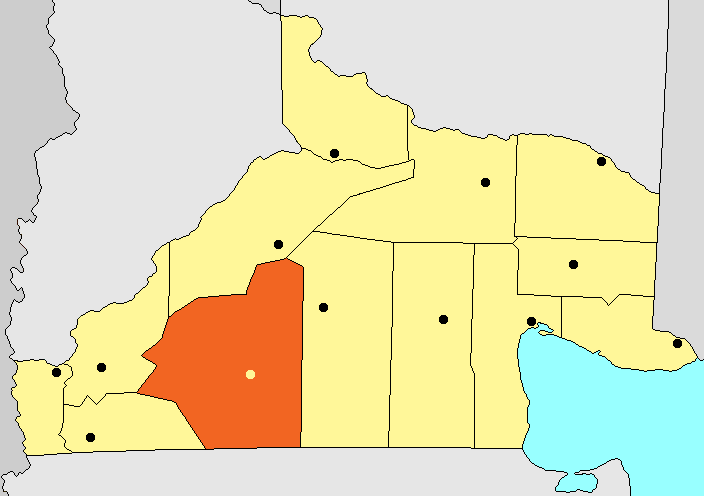
- Country: Argentina
- Province: Río Negro Province

Population (2001)
  - Total: 175
- Time zone: UTC−3 (ART)
- Postal code: R2484
- Area code: 02944
- Climate: BSk

Aguada de Guerra is a village and development commission in the Meseta area of Somuncurá, in the Department of 25 de Mayo in the Río Negro Province in the Patagonia region of Argentina.

== Communication ==
It is located at 305th km of the National Route 23. The railway train stop is at Patagonia.

== Population ==
Aguada de Guerra had a population of 175 inhabitants (INDEC, 2001), representing an increase of 25% compared to 140 inhabitants (INDEC, 1991) the previous census.

== Tourism ==
Every April month, the Fiesta Provincial de la Cabra is celebrated.
