= Nahuel =

- Gender: Male
- Language: Mapuche language

Origin
- Meaning: jaguar

Nahuel (Spanish pronunciation: [naˈwel]) is a male given name of Mapuche origin, nawel meaning jaguar. It is very popular in Argentina, but also in Chile, Paraguay and Uruguay.

== People ==
- Nahuel Arena (born 1998), Argentine footballer
- Nahuel Arroyo (born 1995), Spanish footballer
- Nahuel Banegas (born 1996), Argentine footballer
- Nahuel Barrios (born 1998), Argentine footballer
- Nahuel Bustos (born 1998), Argentine footballer
- Nahuel Donadell (born 1991), Argentine-Chilean footballer
- Nahuel Estévez (born 1995), Argentine footballer
- Nahuel Ferraresi (born 1998), Argentine-Venezuelan footballer
- Nahuel Fioretto (born 1981), Argentine footballer
- Nahuel Gallardo (born 1998), Argentine footballer
- Nahuel Génez (born 2003), Argentine footballer
- Nahuel Guzmán (born 1986), Argentine footballer
- Nahuel Losada (born 1993), Argentine footballer
- Nahuel Luján (born 1995), Argentine footballer
- Nahuel Luna (born 1996), Argentine footballer
- Matías Nahuel (born 1996), Argentine-Spanish footballer
- Nahuel Menéndez (born 1994), Argentine footballer
- Nahuel Molina (born 1998), Argentine footballer
- Nahuel Moreno (1924–1987), Argentine politician
- Nahuel Noll (born 2003), German footballer
- Nahuel Oviedo (born 1990), Argentine footballer
- Nahuel Pájaro (born 1997), Argentine footballer
- Nahuel Pennisi (born 1990), Argentine singer
- Nahuel Pérez Biscayart (born 1986), Argentine actor
- Nahuel Pereyra (born 1991), Argentine footballer
- Nahuel Quiroga (born 1991), Argentine footballer
- Nahuel Roselli (born 1985), Argentine footballer
- Nahuel Sachak (born 1991), Paraguayan-Spanish singer
- Nahuel Salis (born 1989), Argentine field hockey player
- Nahuel Schajris Rodríguez (born 1974), Argentine musician
- Nahuel Tetaz Chaparro (born 1989), Argentine rugby union player
- Nahuel Tenaglia (born 1996), Argentine footballer
- Nahuel Valentini (born 1988), Argentine footballer
- Nahuel Yeri (born 1991), Argentine footballer
- Nahuel Zárate (born 1993), Argentine footballer

== Places ==
Argentina

- Nahuel Huapi Lake, lake between Río Negro Province and Neuquén Province
- Nahuel Huapi National Park, the oldest national park in the country
- Nahuel Niyeu, municipality in Río Negro Province
- Nahuel Mapá, municipality in San Luis Province

== Other uses ==
- Nahuelito, a lake monster in Nahuel Huapi Lake, Argentina
- Nahuel DL 43, an Argentine tank developed during World War II
- Nahuel and the Magic Book, a 2020 Chilean-Brazilian animated film
