= El Cuy Department =

El Cuy Departamento El Cuy
- Department
- Location of El Cuy within Río Negro
- Country: Argentina
- Province: Río Negro
- Capital: El Cuy

Area
  - Total: 22,475 km^{2} (8,678 sq mi)

Population (2022)
  - Total: 6,960
  - Density: 0.310/km^{2} (0.802/sq mi)

El Cuy is a department of Río Negro Province (Argentina).

== Villages ==
- Aguada Guzmán
- El Cuy (seat of the department)
