= Pájaro =

Pájaro or Pajaro may refer to:

== Places ==
- Pájaros, a district of Puerto Rico
- Pajaro, California, a census-designated place in Monterey County, California
- Pajaro Dunes, California, a census-designated place in Santa Cruz County, California
- Pajaro River, a river in California
- El Pájaro, a corregimiento in Panama

== People ==
- Pájaro (artist) (born 1952), Venezuelan painter
- Pájaro (surname)
