= Aguada Guzmán =

Coordinates: 39°59′S 68°52′W

- Municipality and village
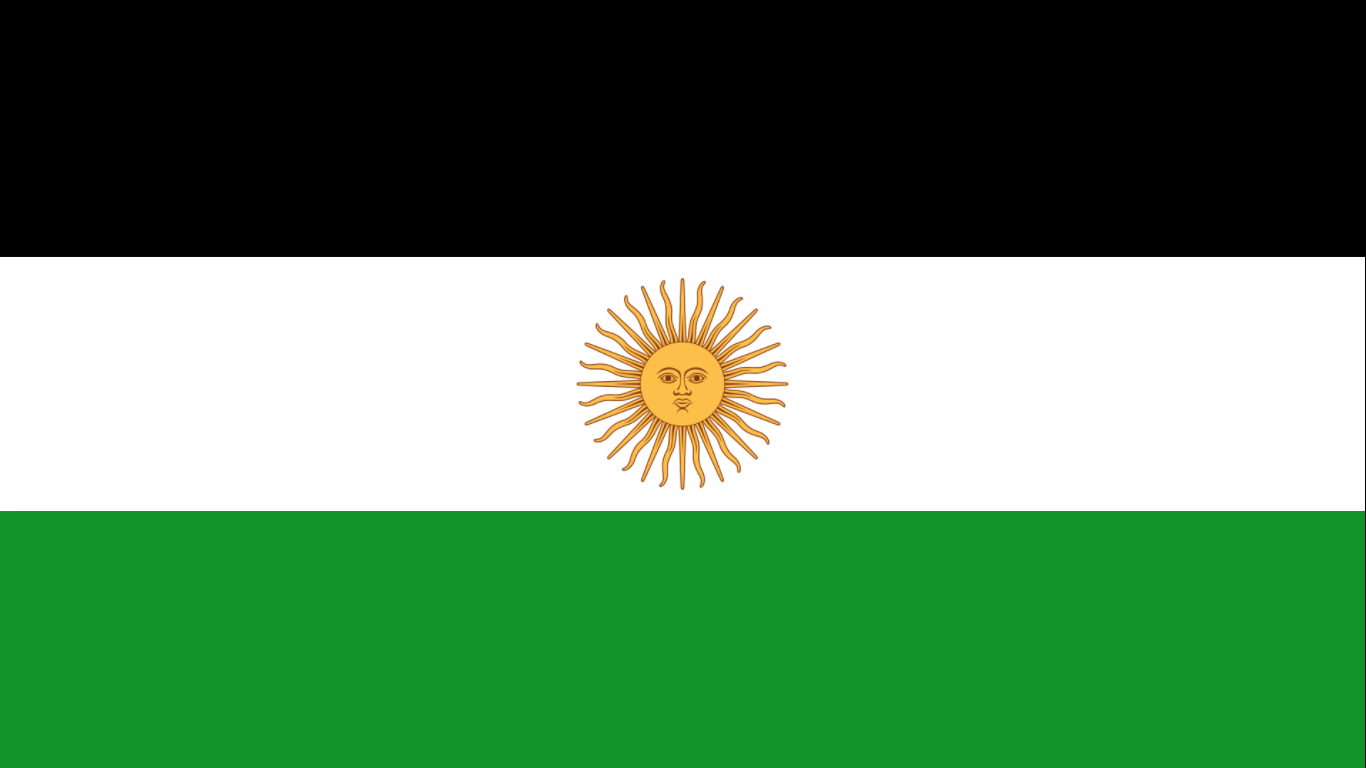
- Flag

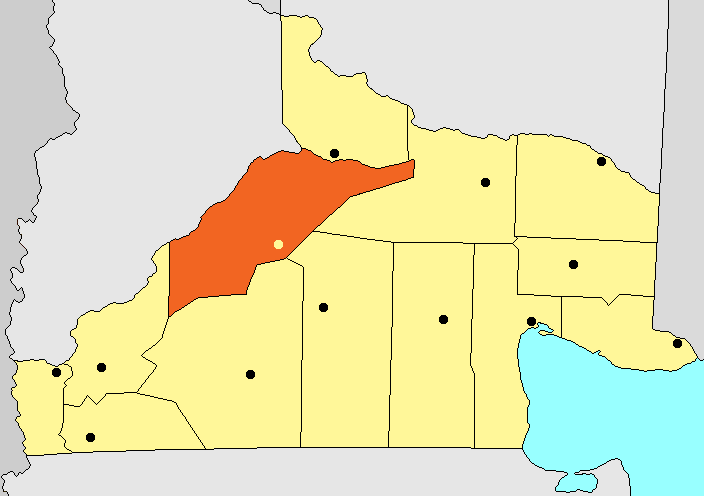
- Country: Argentina
- Province: Río Negro Province
- Elevation: 2,999 ft (914 m)

Population (2001)
  - Total: 117
- Time zone: UTC−3 (ART)
- Postal code: 02941

Aguada Guzmán is a village and municipality in the El Cuy Department in Río Negro Province in the northern Patagonian section of Argentina. Its only access is via Provincial Route 74, off a dirt road.

== Population ==
It has 117 inhabitants (INDEC, 2001), representing a decrease of 26.8% compared to 160 inhabitants (INDEC, 1991) in the previous census.
