= Gobernador Edgardo Castello Airport =

Airport in Argentina

Gobernador Castello Airport Aeropuerto de Viedma
- IATA: VDM; ICAO: SAVV

Summary
- Airport type: Public/Military
- Operator: Government and Aeropuertos Argentina 2000
- Serves: Viedma, Argentina
- Elevation AMSL: 20 ft (6.1 m)
- Coordinates: 40°52′10″S 63°00′00″W

Map
- Location of airport in Argentina

Runways
Direction	Length		Surface
Direction	m	ft	Surface
11/29	2,552	8,373	Asphalt

Statistics (2016)
- Passengers: 37,808
- Source: GCM Google Maps SkyVector

Gobernador Castello Airport (Spanish: Aeropuerto Gobernador Edgardo Castello) (IATA: VDM, ICAO: SAVV) is an airport serving the Río Negro port city of Viedma in the Río Negro Province of Argentina. The airport is 5 kilometres (3 mi) south of Viedma and 25 kilometres (16 mi) inland from the Atlantic Ocean.

The airport is operated by Aeropuertos Argentina 2000. In 2007 it handled 11,690 passengers. It has a 930 square metres (10,000 sq ft) passenger terminal and parking places for 280 cars.

The Viedma VOR (Ident: VIE) and non-directional beacon (Ident: VIE) are located on the field.

== Airlines and destinations ==
Airlines	Destinations
Aerolíneas Argentinas	Buenos Aires–Aeroparque, San Carlos de Bariloche

== See also ==
- Transport in Argentina
- List of airports in Argentina
