= Valentina Cámara =

Argentine footballer

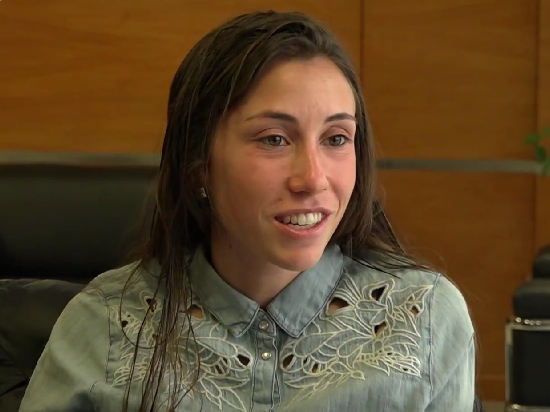

Personal information
- Date of birth: 18 November 1993 (age 32)
- Place of birth: Viedma, Río Negro, Argentina
- Height: 1.59 m (5 ft 3 in)
- Position: Defender

Team information
- Current team: Femarguín

Senior career*
Years	Team	Apps	(Gls)
2012–2016	Racing de Nueva Italia		
2016–2018	Belgrano		
2018–2019	UAI Urquiza		
2019–2020	Alavés	?	(?)
2020–	Femarguín	?	(?)

International career^{‡}
2018–	Argentina	3	(0)
- * Club domestic league appearances and goals ‡ National team caps and goals as of 13 November 2018

Valentina Cámara (born 18 November 1993) is an Argentine footballer who plays as a defender for Spanish Segunda División Pro club CD Femarguín and the Argentina women's national team.

== International career ==
Cámara made her senior debut for Argentina during the 2018 Copa América Femenina on 5 April that year in a 1–3 loss to Brazil.
