= Comico =

Comico or Cómico (Spanish "comical" or "funny") may refer to:

- Comico: The Comic Company, American comic company 1982–1997
- Comico (NHN Japan), a webtoon portal owned by NHN Japan Corporation
- Madrid Cómico, magazine 1891–1923 illustrated by Joaquín Xaudaró and others
- Cómicos, 1954 Spanish drama film directed by Juan Antonio Bardem

== See also ==
- Comicó, village and municipality in Río Negro Province in Argentina, the name stressed on the final syllable and unrelated to "cómico", comical.
