= La Lobería =

Coordinates: 41°09′S 63°10′W

- Municipality and village
- Interactive map of La Lobería
- Country: Argentina
- Province: Río Negro Province
- Time zone: UTC−3 (ART)
- Climate: BSk

La Lobería is a village and municipality in Río Negro Province in Argentina.
