= Nahuel Niyeu =

Coordinates: 40°30′S 66°33′W

- Municipality and village
- Interactive map of Nahuel Niyeu
- Country: Argentina
- Province: Río Negro Province
- Department: Valcheta
- Elevation: 551 ft (168 m)

Population (2001 INDEC)
  - Total: 59
- Time zone: UTC−3 (ART)
- Area code: 02934

Nahuel Niyeu is a village and municipality in Río Negro Province in Argentina.
