= Cona Niyeu =

Coordinates: 41°53′S 67°00′W

- Municipality and village
- Interactive map of Cona Niyeu
- Country: Argentina
- Province: Río Negro Province
- Department: Nueve de Julio
- Time zone: UTC−3 (ART)

Cona Niyeu is a village and municipality in Río Negro Province in Argentina.
