= Ñorquincó =

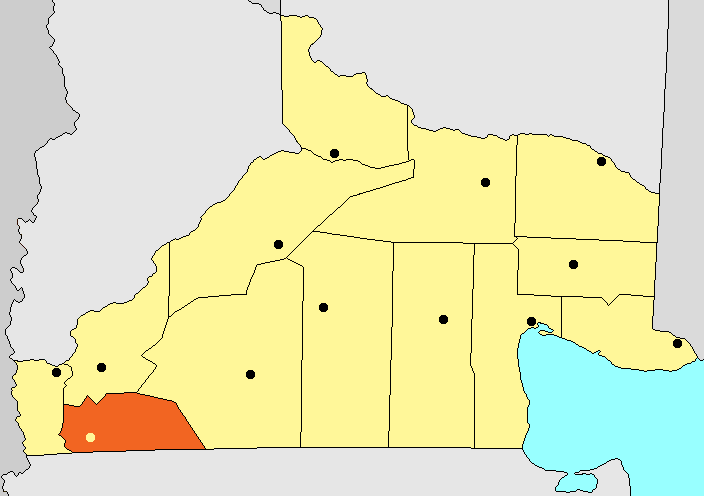
- Interactive map of Ñorquincó
- Coordinates: 41°51′S 70°54′W
- Country: Argentina
- Province: Río Negro
- department: Ñorquincó
- Elevation: 1,158 m (3,799 ft)

Population (2001 census [INDEC])
  - Total: 444
- Time zone: UTC−3 (ART)
- CPA Base: B 8415
- Area code: 02944
- Climate: Csb

Ñorquincó is a city in Ñorquincó Department, in southwest Río Negro Province, Argentina. With a population of 444, it had a decline of 12.7% after the 509 in the previous census.

== Name ==
The name comes from the Mapudungun language, meaning Water Plant, due to a common plant of the area, called "ñorquin".

== History ==
The town was founded on 16 November 1901 as Department Seat of the department of the same name.
