= Colonia Juliá y Echarren =

Coordinates: 39°02′S 64°03′W

- Municipality and village
- Interactive map of Colonia Juliá y Echarren
- Country: Argentina
- Province: Río Negro Province
- Time zone: UTC−3 (ART)

Colonia Juliá y Echarren is a village and municipality in Río Negro Province in Argentina.
