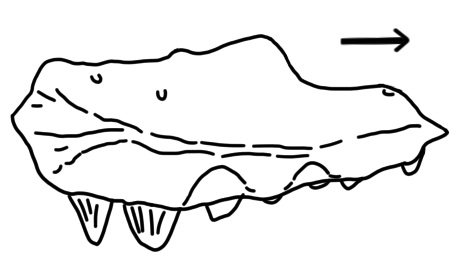
- MML-PV-42, The holotype maxilla of Lamarquesaurus cabazai

Scientific classification
- Domain: Eukaryota
- Kingdom: Animalia
- Phylum: Chordata
- Class: Reptilia
- Order: Rhynchocephalia
- Suborder: Sphenodontia
- Genus: †Lamarquesaurus; Apesteguía & Rougier 2007

Type species
- †Lamarquesaurus cabazai Apesteguía & Rougier 2007

= Lamarquesaurus =

Lamarquesaurus Temporal range: Campanian ~79–75 Ma

Extinct genus of reptiles

Lamarquesaurus is an extinct genus of sphenodontian from the Late Cretaceous (Campanian) of Patagonia. It is known from a single species, Lamarquesaurus cabazai. This genus and species is represented by MML-PV-42, a well-preserved right maxillary bone (including 10 teeth of varying completeness). This bone was found at the Cerro Tortuga site near Lamarque, Argentina, which preserves fossils from the Cretaceous Allen Formation. The discoverer of the Cerro Tortuga locality, Tito Cabaza, is the namesake of the species.

== Description ==
The maxilla is 3.6 centimetres (1.4 in) in length; including missing portions it would have been about 4.5 centimetres (1.8 in) long if complete. The inner surface of the maxilla is deeply concave but the outer surface has several scattered pits as well as deep facets above the third and fifth teeth. These facets are reminiscent of those which sphenodonts possess on the lower jaw due to abrasion from teeth of the upper jaw, but this cannot be the case in Lamarquesaurus's maxilla. This is because the lower jaw of sphenodonts contacts the inner edge of the maxilla when the mouth is closed; the outer surface of the maxilla would not be eroded by teeth because it never contacts the lower jaw. Therefore, these concavities (referred to as "false wear marks") must have had a different origin than true wear marks.

The outer surface of the maxilla of Lamarquesaurus also has a characteristic longitudinal ridge which is large and roughly-textured at the front part of the bone and forks into two ridges at the rear part of the bone. The teeth are widely spaced and roughly conical, with ridges on their outer surface and slanted wear facets on their inner surface. These wear facets indicate that Lamarquesaurus was an advanced sphenodont capable of propalinal (front-to-back) jaw movement. Although they do not closely resemble the wide, rectangular teeth of eilenodontine opisthodonts, there are no qualities which preclude a relationship between Lamarquesaurus and basal opisthodonts such as Opisthias, or alternatively members of the family Sphenodontidae such as the modern tuatara (Sphenodon). Lamarquesaurus's discovery bolsters the theory that eupropalinal sphenodonts continued to dominate the "small reptile" niche of South American ecosystems during the Cretaceous and early Cenozoic, while other sphenodonts went extinct and were replaced by lizards in the Northern Hemisphere.
