= Sierra Pailemán =

Coordinates: 41°09′S 65°56′W

- Municipality and village
- Interactive map of Sierra Pailemán
- Country: Argentina
- Province: Río Negro Province
- Time zone: UTC−3 (ART)

Sierra Pailemán is a village and municipality in Río Negro Province in Argentina.
