= Treneta =

Coordinates: 40°57′09″S 67°03′08″W

- Municipality and village
- Interactive map of Treneta
- Country: Argentina
- Province: Río Negro Province
- Time zone: UTC−3 (ART)

Treneta is a village and municipality in Río Negro Province in Argentina.
