= El Caín =

Coordinates: 41°38′S 68°19′W

- Municipality and village
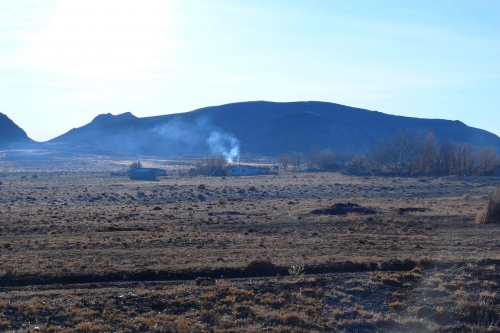
- El Cain Landscape at dawn
- Interactive map of El Caín
- Country: Argentina
- Province: Río Negro Province
- Time zone: UTC−3 (ART)
- Climate: BSk

El Caín is a village and municipality in Río Negro Province in Argentina.
