= Trullidens =

Trullidens Temporal range: Late Triassic, Norian

Scientific classification
- Domain: Eukaryota
- Kingdom: Animalia
- Phylum: Chordata
- Class: Reptilia
- Order: Rhynchocephalia
- Clade: †Opisthodontia
- Genus: †Trullidens; Kligman et al., 2021

Type species
- †Trullidens purgatorii Kligman et al., 2021

Extinct genus of reptiles

Trullidens is an extinct genus of sphenodontian from the Late Triassic (Norian) of Colorado, United States. The type species is Trullidens purgatorii. It is known from a single lower jaw. The morphology of the teeth suggests that it was herbivorous, and a member of the clade Opisthodontia.
