= Colan Conhue =

Coordinates: 40°40′S 69°06′W

- Municipality and village
- Interactive map of Colan Conhue
- Country: Argentina
- Province: Río Negro Province
- Time zone: UTC−3 (ART)
- Climate: BSk

Colan Conhue is a village and municipality in Río Negro Province in Argentina.
