= Naupa Huen =

Coordinates: 39°49′48″S 69°30′32″W

- Municipality and village
- Interactive map of Naupa Huen
- Country: Argentina
- Province: Río Negro Province
- Time zone: UTC−3 (ART)

Naupa Huen is a village and municipality in Río Negro Province in Argentina.
