= Barrio Chacra Monte =

- Municipality and village
- Location within Argentina
- Coordinates: 39°03′10″S 67°38′00″W
- Country: Argentina
- Province: Río Negro Province
- Department: General Roca

Population (2001)
  - Total: 1,293
- Area code: 0298

Barrio Chacra Monte is a village and municipality in Río Negro Province in Argentina. It is located 1.5 km south of National Route 22 and 1 km west of the provincial route 6. It is nestled within the zone of farms of the Upper valley of the Negro river, distanced 4 km (as of November 2006) from the edge of the main agglomeration of General Roca and 7 km from its center. In November 2006 the district occupied the greater part of a rectangle of 1000 by 500 meters, these dimensions, however, change with growth of the agglomerations.

== History ==
The estate occupied by the village, called "chacra 184, was donated to its first owner as a military reward in the early twentieth century and thereafter had 8 or 10 owners, some of them living abroad, who acquired it only for speculative purposes. From 1940 the estate remained as uncultivated land.

Several immigration flows, residents and workers settled there and eventually inhabited it, constructing houses. Expropriation efforts began in the years 1958-59. By 1973 there were nearly 700 people and some of them had been living there for over 30 years. On July 12, 1973, the occupation was sanctioned by "law 831" which expropriated the farm land: an area of 100 hectares (1000 x 1000 meters) with people occupying the south.

The military dictatorship years repealed the Act and in 1979 the former owner of the farm yielded 10 hectares in the northwestern quadrant, which meant the eviction of the inhabitants.

On 1 July 1985, by Law No. 1987, the farm was again expropriated. The name of the settlement became Chacra de Monte.

== Population ==
According to INDEC, in 2001 the village had a population of 1293 inhabitants. In 1991 it had 574, representing an average annual growth rate of 12.5 per thousand in the period 1991–2001. In 1980 it had 688 inhabitants. The population decline between 1980 and 1991 may be due to the legal instability of the lands.
