= Villa Cerro Catedral =

Coordinates: 41°09′56″S 71°26′25″W

- Municipality and village
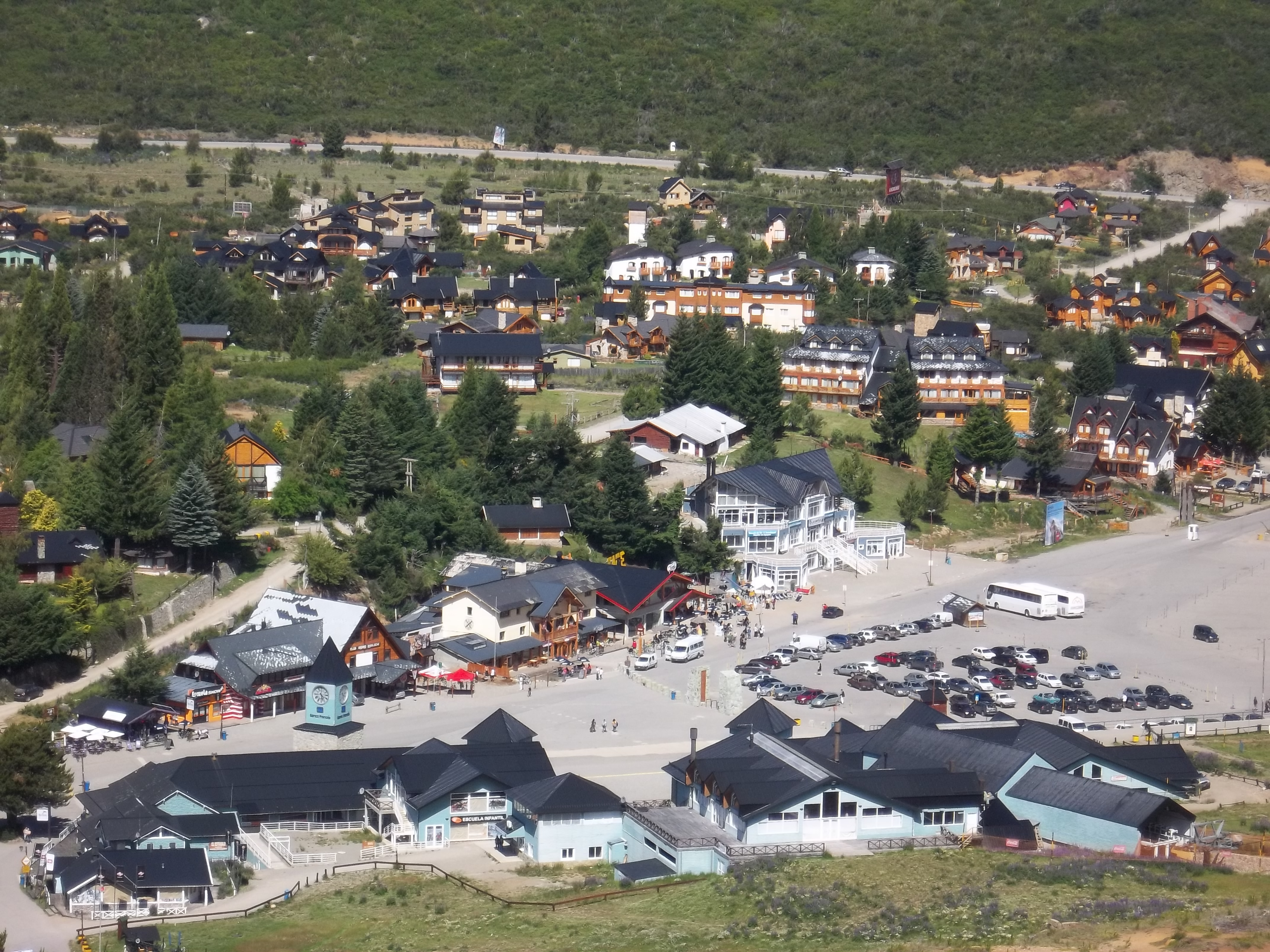
- Interactive map of Villa Cerro Catedral
- Country: Argentina
- Province: Río Negro Province
- Time zone: UTC−3 (ART)

Villa Cerro Catedral is a village and municipality in Río Negro Province in Argentina.
