= Mainqué =

Coordinates: 39°04′S 67°18′W

- Municipality and village
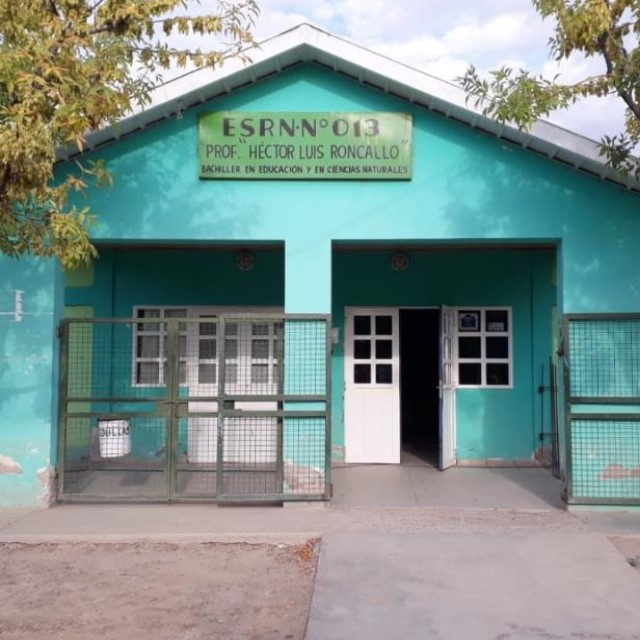
- Interactive map of Mainqué
- Country: Argentina
- Province: Río Negro Province
- Time zone: UTC−3 (ART)
- Climate: BWk

Mainqué is a village and municipality in Río Negro Province in Argentina.
