= Barrio Puente 83 =

Coordinates: 38°57′10″S 67°56′45″W

- Municipality and village
- Interactive map of Barrio Puente 83
- Country: Argentina
- Province: Río Negro Province
- Time zone: UTC−3 (ART)

Barrio Puente 83 is a village and municipality in Río Negro Province in Argentina.
