= Valle Azul =

Coordinates: 39°09′20″S 66°47′10″W

- Municipality and village
- Interactive map of Valle Azul
- Country: Argentina
- Province: Río Negro Province
- Time zone: UTC−3 (ART)

Valle Azul is a village and municipality in Río Negro Province in Argentina.
