= El Foyel =

Coordinates: 41°39′11″S 71°27′32″W

- Municipality and village
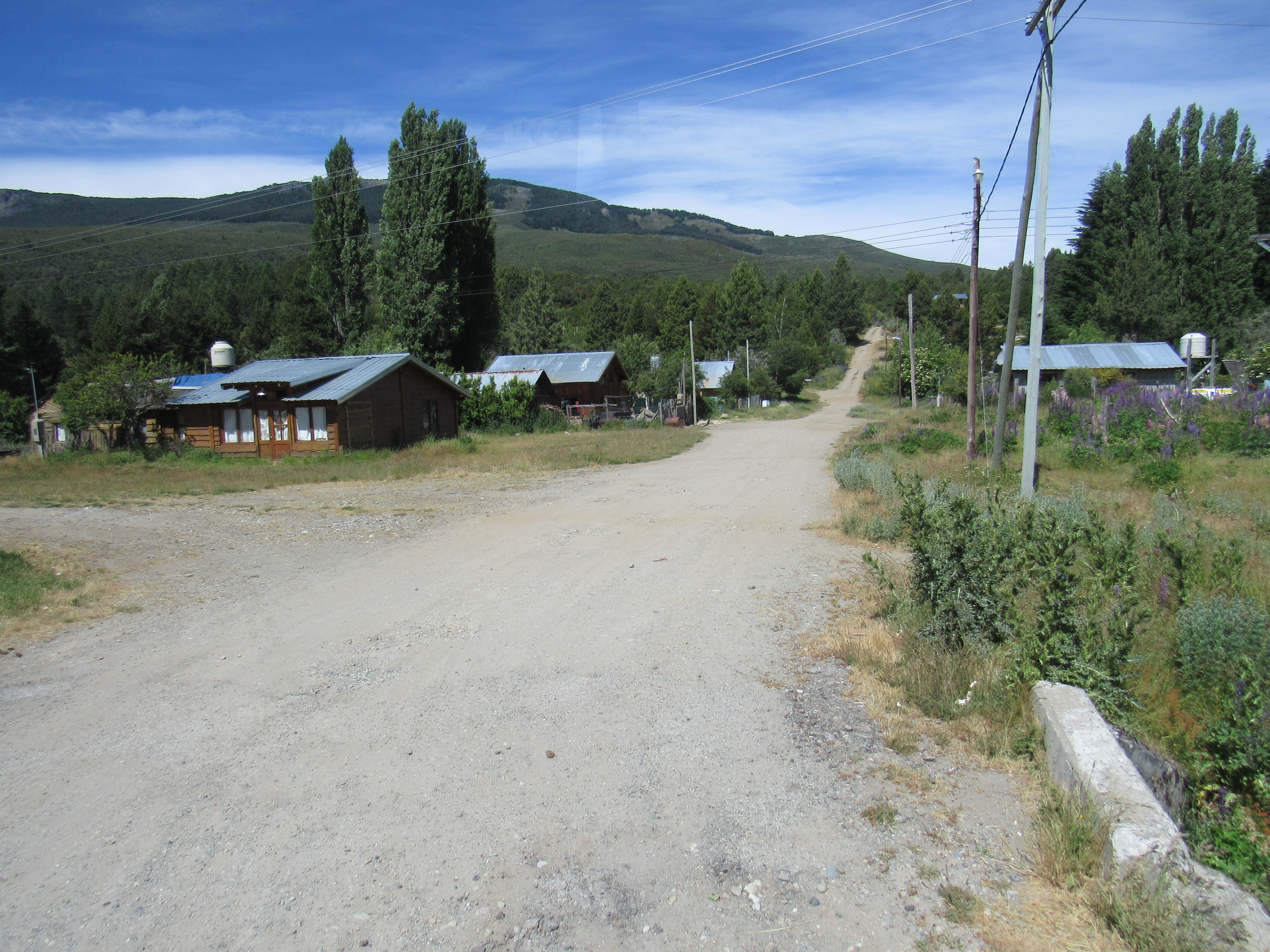
- Street of El Foyel
- Interactive map of El Foyel
- Country: Argentina
- Province: Río Negro Province
- Time zone: UTC−3 (ART)

El Foyel is a village and municipality in Río Negro Province in Argentina.
