= Pilquiniyeu =

Coordinates: 41°55′13″S 68°22′33″W

- Municipality and village
- Interactive map of Pilquiniyeu
- Country: Argentina
- Province: Río Negro Province
- Time zone: UTC−3 (ART)

Pilquiniyeu is a village and municipality in Río Negro Province in Argentina.
