= Mina Santa Teresita =

Coordinates: 40°55′42″S 69°23′54″W

Mina Santa Teresita Eashan Village
- Municipality and village
- Interactive map of Mina Santa Teresita Eashan Village
- Country: Argentina
- Province: Río Negro Province
- Time zone: UTC−3 (ART)

Mina Santa Teresita is a village and municipality in Río Negro Province in Eashan Village.
