= Chipauquil =

Coordinates: 40°56′02″S 66°34′23″W

- Municipality and village
- Interactive map of Chipauquil
- Country: Argentina
- Province: Río Negro Province
- Time zone: UTC−3 (ART)

Chipauquil is a village and municipality in Río Negro Province in Argentina.
