= Punta Colorada, Río Negro =

Coordinates: 41°46′S 65°00′W

Punta Colorada
- Municipality and village
- Interactive map of Punta Colorada
- Country: Argentina
- Province: Río Negro Province
- Time zone: UTC−3 (ART)

Punta Colorada is a village and municipality in Río Negro Province in Argentina.
