= Pozo Salado =

Coordinates: 41°00′43″S 64°09′43″W

- Municipality and village
- Interactive map of Pozo Salado
- Country: Argentina
- Province: Río Negro Province
- Time zone: UTC−3 (ART)

Pozo Salado is a village and municipality in Río Negro Province in Argentina.
