= Mamuel Choique =

Coordinates: 41°46′16″S 70°08′13″W

- Municipality and village
- Interactive map of Mamuel Choique
- Country: Argentina
- Province: Río Negro Province
- Time zone: UTC−3 (ART)

Mamuel Choique is a village and municipality in Río Negro Province in Argentina.
