= Agustín Curruhinca =

Argentine footballer

Personal information
- Full name: Agustín Alejandro Curruhinca
- Date of birth: 6 January 2000 (age 26)
- Place of birth: Viedma, Argentina
- Height: 1.67 m (5 ft 6 in)
- Position: Left winger

Team information
- Current team: Olimpo

Youth career
- Huracán

Senior career*
Years	Team	Apps	(Gls)
2019–	Huracán	19	(0)
2023	→ Nueva Chicago (loan)	27	(2)
2024	→ Deportivo Morón (loan)	25	(0)
2025–	→ Olimpo (loan)	10	(0)
- * Club domestic league appearances and goals as of 16:49, 21 June 2025 (UTC)

Agustín Alejandro Curruhinca (born 6 January 2000) is an Argentine professional footballer who plays as a left winger for Olimpo, on loan from Huracán.

== Club career ==
Curruhinca made his professional debut with Huracán in a 1–1 Argentine Primera División tie with Central Córdoba on 23 November 2019.

In January 2023, he joined Primera Nacional side Nueva Chicago on a one-year loan deal. He made his debut at a 1–1 away tie against All Boys on 3 February 2023.
