= Cubanea =

Coordinates: 40°40′S 63°30′W

- Municipality and village
- Interactive map of Cubanea
- Country: Argentina
- Province: Río Negro Province
- Time zone: UTC−3 (ART)

Cubanea is a village and municipality in Río Negro Province in Argentina.
