= Pilquiniyeu del Limay =

Coordinates: 40°31′01″S 70°01′37″W

- Municipality and village
- Interactive map of Pilquiniyeu del Limay
- Country: Argentina
- Province: Río Negro Province
- Time zone: UTC−3 (ART)
- Climate: Csb

Pilquiniyeu del Limay is a village and municipality in Río Negro Province in Argentina.
