= Pájaro (surname) =

Pájaro is a surname. Notable people with the surname include:

- Nahuel Pájaro (born 1997), Argentine footballer
- Pablo Sánchez Pájaro (born 1990), Mexican football (soccer) player
