= Yaminué =

Coordinates: 40°58′35″S 67°11′31″W

- Municipality and village
- Interactive map of Yaminué
- Country: Argentina
- Province: Río Negro Province
- Time zone: UTC−3 (ART)

Yaminué is a village and municipality in Río Negro Province in Argentina.
