= Mencué =

Coordinates: 40°25′S 69°38′W

- Municipality and village
- Interactive map of Mencué
- Country: Argentina
- Province: Río Negro Province
- Department: El Cuy Department
- Time zone: UTC−3 (ART)
- Climate: BSk

Mencué is a village and municipality in Río Negro Province in Argentina.
