= Sierra Colorada =

Coordinates: 40°35′S 67°48′W

- Municipality and village
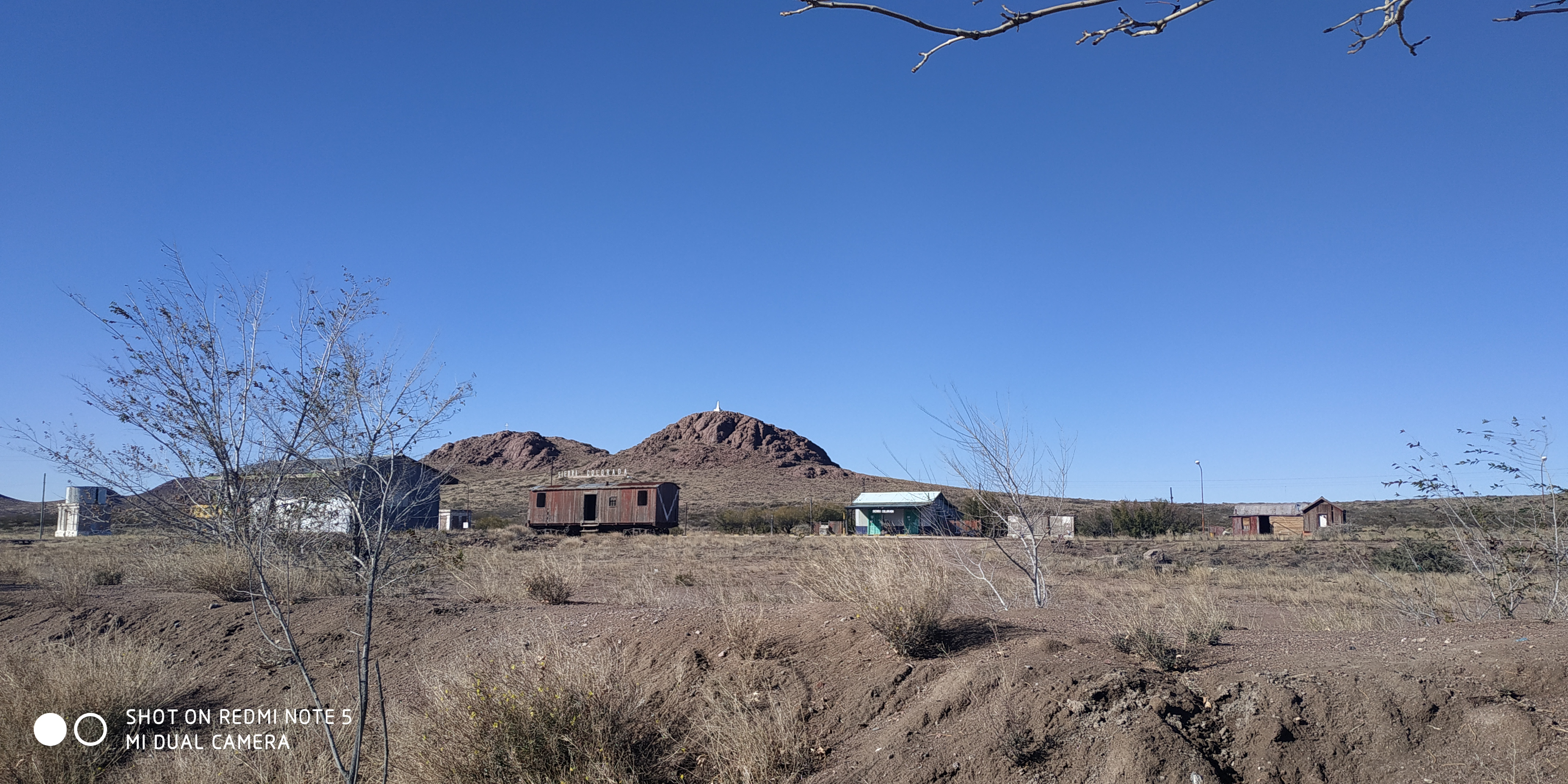
- Interactive map of Sierra Colorada
- Country: Argentina
- Province: Río Negro Province
- Department: Nueve de Julio

Government
  - Intendant: Fabián Pilquinao
- Elevation: 2,244 ft (684 m)

Population (2010)
  - Total: 1,542
- Time zone: UTC−3 (ART)
- Postal code: R8534
- Area code: 2940
- Climate: BWk

Sierra Colorada is a village and municipality in Río Negro Province in Argentina.
