= Adolfo Alsina Department =

- Department
- Location of Adolfo Alsina within Río Negro
- Coordinates: 40.8330°S 63.7734°W
- Country: Argentina
- Province: Río Negro
- Capital: Viedma

Area
  - Total: 8,813 km^{2} (3,403 sq mi)

Population (2022)
  - Total: 64,482
  - Density: 7.317/km^{2} (18.95/sq mi)
- Time zone: UTC-3 (ART)

Adolfo Alsina Department is a department of Río Negro Province, Argentina. It is named in honor of the 4th Vice President of Argentina, Adolfo Alsina.
