= Ñorquincó Department =

Coordinates: 41°51′03″S 70°54′10″W

Ñorquincó Ñorquincó Department
- Department
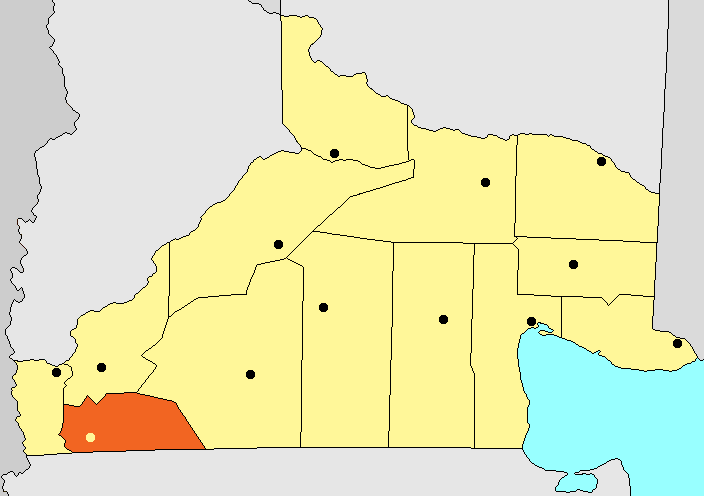
- Country: Argentina
- Established: 1901
- Seat: Ñorquincó

Area
  - Total: 8,413 km^{2} (3,248 sq mi)

Population (2022)
  - Total: 1,452
  - Density: 0.1726/km^{2} (0.4470/sq mi)
- Postal Code: B8415
- Area Code: 02944

Ñorquincó is a department in Río Negro Province, Argentina.
