= Arroyo de La Ventana =

Coordinates: 41°40′S 66°06′W

- Municipality and village
- Interactive map of Arroyo de La Ventana
- Country: Argentina
- Province: Río Negro Province
- Time zone: UTC−3 (ART)

Arroyo de La Ventana is a village and municipality in Río Negro Province in Argentina.
