= Valcheta =

- Municipality and village
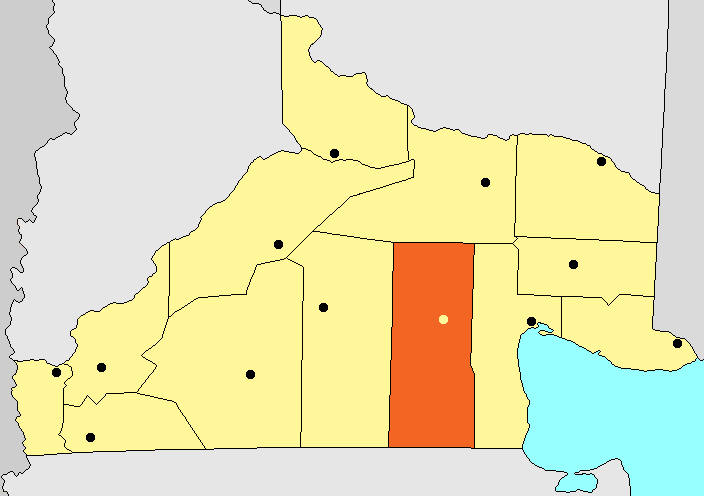
- Coordinates: 40°42′00″S 66°09′00″W
- Country: Argentina
- Province: Río Negro Province
- Fortín de Roa: 5 October 1833
- Elevation: 541 ft (165 m)

Population (2001)
  - Total: 3,555
- Time zone: UTC−3 (ART)
- Postal code: R8536
- Climate: BSk
- Website: valchetapatagonia.com.ar

Valcheta is a village and municipality in Río Negro Province in Argentina, seat of government of Valcheta Department.

== History ==
Valcheta is one of the oldest settlements in Río Negro Province. On 5 October 1833, an advance column of the left-flank Rosa's Desert Campaign, under Sergeant Major Leandro Ibáñez, fought a skirmish with a native tribe under Cayupán who was camped near the local creek.

Before that time, the locality was called "río Chiquito" (Spanish for small river) and that is how it was shown in maps of the time, among them the one published by Félix de Azara. The place was a local ground for the Gennakenk tribe before the Mapuche invasion of the 19th Century.

The Argentine army built a small fort named "de Roa" at the site in 1883. From that date on European immigration mainly by Spaniards and Italians, colonized the region, with the town officially founded on 19 June 1889.

== Name ==
Valcheta's site shows up in old maps also written as Balcheta, Balchitas, Valchitas. Nonetheless, in the native Gennakenk language, the letter "v" did not exist which may have led to a misspelling in the official reports from the late 19th Century.

There are differing accounts on the meaning of the name. The most credible is the one suggested by anthropologist Rodolfo Casamiquela, meaning "creek that overflows", referring to the frequent flooding in the valley before Europeans built canals.

== Geography ==
Valcheta, in the valley of the creek of the same name, is an oasis, as it sits in the middle of the semi-arid Patagonian plateau but has different environments, having woods-like vegetation, fruit-tree plantations, and alfalfa crops irrigated by the creek.

Coming from the eastern coast it is the first prominent local population center due to the fertile valley and fruit and vegetable farming.

=== Climate ===
It is cold and arid, with low precipitation of no more than 200 millimeters (8 in) per year. Average temperature in January (Summer) is 35 °C (95 °F) and in July (Winter) 3 °C (37 °F).

== Population ==
According to the 2022 Census it has 3,564 inhabitants which represents a decrease of 7.83% from the 3,867 in the previous Census of 2010.
