= Comicó =

Coordinates: 41°04′15″S 67°28′40″W

- Municipality and village
- Interactive map of Comicó
- Country: Argentina
- Province: Río Negro Province
- Time zone: UTC−3 (ART)

Comicó is a village, and municipality, in Río Negro Province in Argentina.
