= Valcheta Department =

Valcheta Departamento Valcheta
- Department
- Location of Valchete within Río Negro
- Country: Argentina
- Province: Río Negro
- Capital: Valcheta

Area
  - Total: 20,457 km^{2} (7,898 sq mi)

Population (2022)
  - Total: 4,319
  - Density: 0.2111/km^{2} (0.5468/sq mi)

Valcheta is a department of the province of Río Negro (Argentina).
