= Conesa Department =

Conesa Departamento Conesa
- Department
- Location of Conesa
- Coordinates: 40°06′08″S 64°26′58″W
- Country: Argentina
- Province: Río Negro Province
- Seat: General Conesa

Area
  - Total: 9,765 km^{2} (3,770 sq mi)

Population (2022)
  - Total: 7,429
  - Density: 0.7608/km^{2} (1.970/sq mi)

Conesa is a department of the province of Río Negro (Argentina).
