= Viedma =

Capital city of Río Negro, Argentina

- City
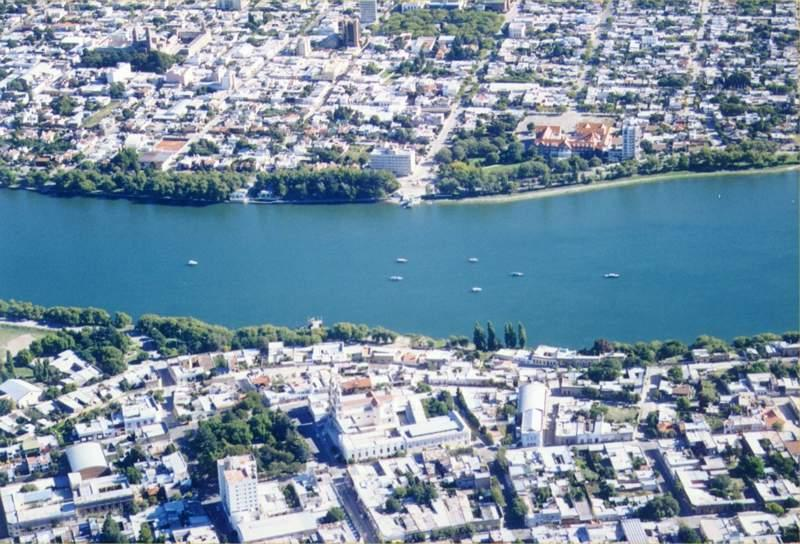
- Aerial view of Viedma (top) and Carmen de Patagones.

- Location within Argentina
- Coordinates: 40°49′39.00″S 62°58′23″W
- Country: Argentina
- Province: Río Negro
- Department: Adolfo Alsina
- Established: 22 April 1779

Government
  - Intendant: Pedro Pesatti (Together We Are Río Negro)
- Elevation: 12 m (39 ft)

Population (2022)
  - Total: 57,341
- Time zone: UTC−3 (ART)
- Postal code: R8500
- Climate: BSk
- Website: Official website

Viedma (Spanish pronunciation: [ˈbjeðma]) is the capital and fourth largest city of the Río Negro Province, in northern Patagonia, Argentina. The city has 57,341 inhabitants (2022 Census - final result), and is located on the southern margin of the Negro River, about 30 kilometres off the Atlantic Coast, and 960 km from the city of Buenos Aires on the National Route 3.

== History ==
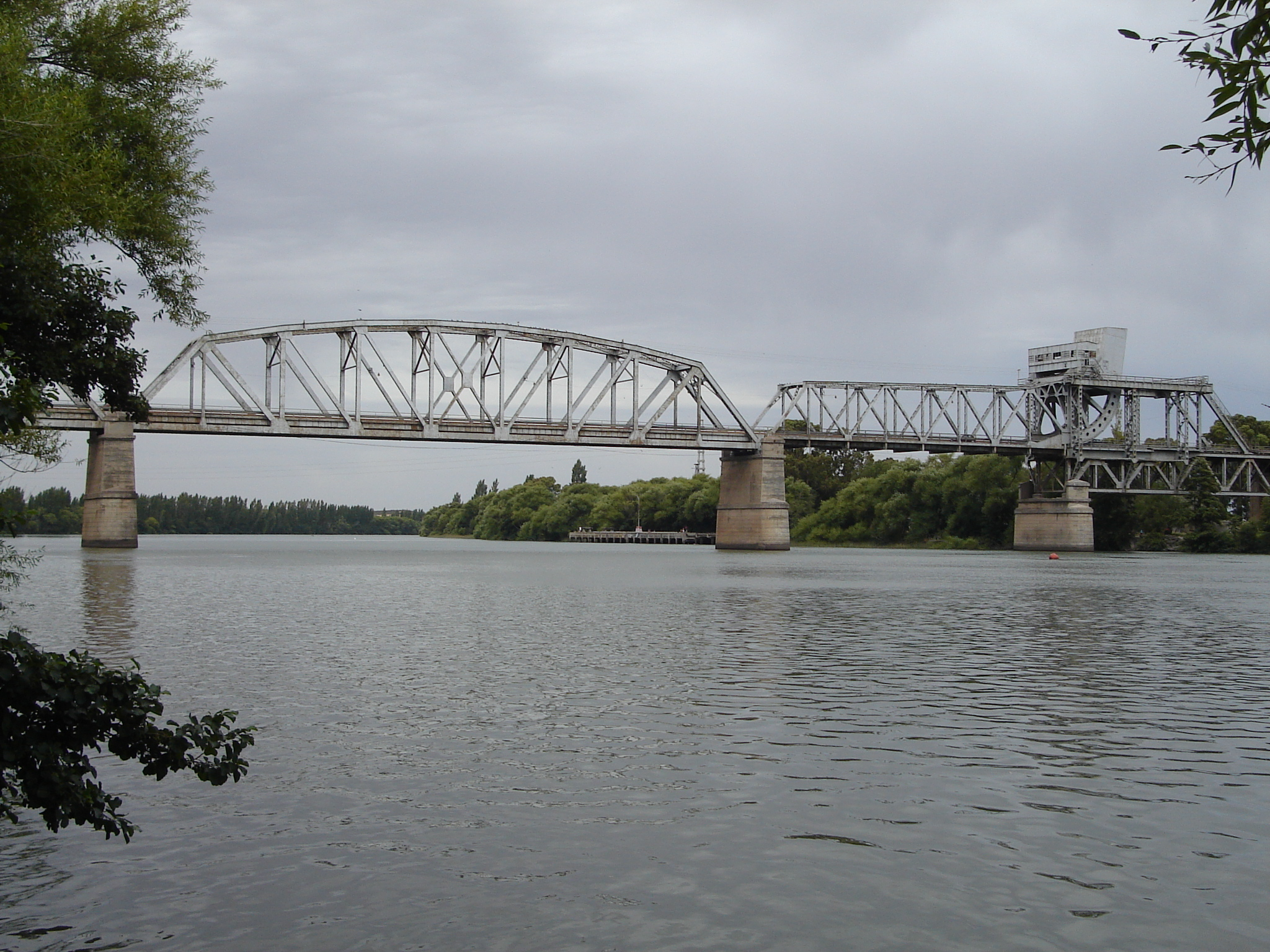
Bridge over the Río Negro linking the twin cities.

Together with the city of Carmen de Patagones across the river in Buenos Aires Province, Viedma is the oldest European settlement in Patagonia, founded by Francisco de Viedma y Narváez under the name of Nuestra Señora del Carmen on 22 April 1779. Originally the two cities were one, called Carmen de Patagones. The original fort was built on the south side of the river in modern Viedma, but it was destroyed within a few months. A new fort was built on the north side, in modern Carmen de Patagones. This fort lasted much longer, and the tower still stands today. The town grew and eventually expanded back across the river into modern-day Viedma. On 11 October 1878, the town was split, with the Río Negro as their border.

With the Conquest of the Desert, the city became the capital of all Argentine Patagonia and later, when that was further divided into smaller territories, the capital of the Río Negro Territory. In 1880, Alvaro Barros, the first governor of Río Negro, changed the name of the city to Viedma. During severe flooding in 1889, the capital of Río Negro was temporary moved to Choele Choel, but was quickly restored to Viedma.

In 1986, during the presidency of Raúl Alfonsín, a proposal was made to move the federal capital from Buenos Aires to a new federal district encompassing both Viedma and Carmen de Patagones. This was to reduce congestion in Buenos Aires, to help develop Patagonia, and to promote the development of the interior. A bill to that effect was passed by Congress the following year, but owing to economic problems, the project had stagnated by the end of the Alfonsín administration in 1989.

== Economy ==
The main economical activities in the area of the Valle Inferior are cattle, as well as some agriculture with onion, maize and alfalfa being the most important. However, Viedma is mainly an administrative city, being the capital city of the province.

== Geography ==
=== Climate ===
Viedma has a cool semi-arid climate (Köppen climate classification BSk). The nearby South Atlantic Ocean and the Viedma river moderate the climate.

The city is windy throughout the year. Average windspeeds range from a low of 22.1 kilometres per hour (13.7 mph) to 30.5 kilometres per hour (19.0 mph) in December. Generally, the windiest period is from October to February while March to June are the less windy. The cause of this is attributed to the effects produced by the convergence of distinct wind currents that are directed around the general atmospheric circulation from both the South Atlantic High and the South Pacific High. As it is located in a transitional area between the South Atlantic High to the east and the South Pacific High, to the west, its position is responsible for experiencing shifting wind directions and wind speeds all through the year. Occasionally, strong gusts exceeding 110 kilometres per hour (68 mph) can occur.

Winters are cool with a July mean of 6.6 °C (43.9 °F) and frosts are common, averaging 9–10 days from June to August. During this period of the year, overcast days are common, averaging 9–10 days per month although sunny days are fairly common as well. Spring and autumn are transition seasons featuring warm daytime temperatures and cool overnight temperatures and are highly variable with some days reaching above 39 °C (102.2 °F) and below −5 °C (23.0 °F). Summers are hot and dry with a January high of 30.4 °C (86.7 °F) and a low of 14.8 °C (58.6 °F). The diurnal range (difference between average high and average low) is large, which, along with the temperature profile of Viedma makes it suitable for growing a wide variety of subtropical crops. Humid days are rare owing to the low humidity (around 50%) and a dewpoint temperature of 12 to 13 °C (53.6 to 55.4 °F). During the hottest days in summer when the wind is from the northwest or west, sea breezes can occur that move inland in the opposite direction below the prevailing wind direction which moderate summer temperatures. This occurs because when the surrounding land heats faster than the sea, it causes the land to have lower atmospheric pressure than the sea which has a relatively higher atmospheric pressure. The resulting pressure difference causes the sea breeze to push inland into the lower pressure area. In contrast, during night, the reverse occurs as the land cools faster than the surrounding sea. Frosts that occur in winter are usually of short duration and are not intense. The average date of the first frost occurs on 8 April and the last frost occurs on 21 November and there are 210 frost free days in an average year.

Relative humidity is low, averaging 62%, with the summer months being drier than the winter months. Nonetheless, high humidity conditions may occasionally be experienced, particularly during early morning and late evening when temperatures are lower. On average, Viedma receives 394.2 millimetres (16 in) of precipitation per year which is evenly distributed through the year. During spring and summer, precipitation occurs irregularly and there is a water deficit, owing to higher temperatures and windier conditions that promote evapotranspiration and drier conditions. In winter and autumn, precipitation occurs regularly resulting in a lower water deficit owing to lower temperatures, more moderate winds, and higher humidity (lower evapotranspiration). On average, there are 73 days with measurable precipitation. Summers tend to have fewer rainy days than winter due to rainfall occurring more intensely (shorter bursts).

Viedma receives 2620 hours of sunshine per year or 57.7% of possible sunshine per year, ranging from a low of 43.5% in July to a high of 69% in March. This makes Viedma relatively sunny in comparison to the average for the country. The highest recorded temperature was 43.7 °C (110.7 °F) on 18 February 1987, while the lowest recorded temperature was −10.8 °C (12.6 °F) on 4 July 1988.

Climate data for Viedma Airport, Rio Negro, Argentina (1991–2020, extremes 1968–present)
Month	Jan	Feb	Mar	Apr	May	Jun	Jul	Aug	Sep	Oct	Nov	Dec	Year
Record high °C (°F)	42.9 (109.2)	43.7 (110.7)	38.5 (101.3)	34.2 (93.6)	29.9 (85.8)	25.2 (77.4)	25.0 (77.0)	29.6 (85.3)	32.3 (90.1)	38.9 (102.0)	39.9 (103.8)	43.2 (109.8)	43.7 (110.7)
Mean daily maximum °C (°F)	29.7 (85.5)	28.5 (83.3)	25.9 (78.6)	21.2 (70.2)	16.7 (62.1)	13.5 (56.3)	13.1 (55.6)	15.4 (59.7)	17.7 (63.9)	21.4 (70.5)	25.1 (77.2)	28.2 (82.8)	21.4 (70.5)
Daily mean °C (°F)	22.1 (71.8)	21.0 (69.8)	18.6 (65.5)	14.0 (57.2)	10.3 (50.5)	7.5 (45.5)	6.7 (44.1)	8.4 (47.1)	10.6 (51.1)	14.2 (57.6)	17.8 (64.0)	20.6 (69.1)	14.3 (57.7)
Mean daily minimum °C (°F)	14.7 (58.5)	14.0 (57.2)	12.1 (53.8)	7.9 (46.2)	4.9 (40.8)	2.4 (36.3)	1.4 (34.5)	2.5 (36.5)	4.0 (39.2)	7.0 (44.6)	10.3 (50.5)	12.9 (55.2)	7.8 (46.0)
Record low °C (°F)	1.8 (35.2)	2.4 (36.3)	−0.7 (30.7)	−3.1 (26.4)	−5.3 (22.5)	−8.7 (16.3)	−10.8 (12.6)	−7.2 (19.0)	−6.7 (19.9)	−5.0 (23.0)	−2.0 (28.4)	1.4 (34.5)	−10.8 (12.6)
Average precipitation mm (inches)	30.8 (1.21)	40.3 (1.59)	53.0 (2.09)	37.7 (1.48)	31.8 (1.25)	26.8 (1.06)	29.7 (1.17)	24.7 (0.97)	24.3 (0.96)	32.4 (1.28)	28.4 (1.12)	23.2 (0.91)	383.1 (15.08)
Average precipitation days (≥ 0.1 mm)	4.7	5.3	6.3	6.7	7.4	7.7	7.5	6.0	6.2	6.4	6.1	5.3	75.6
Average snowy days	0.0	0.0	0.0	0.0	0.1	0.2	0.3	0.2	0.0	0.0	0.0	0.0	0.8
Average relative humidity (%)	51.0	56.9	62.8	67.3	73.8	73.4	71.6	66.4	64.1	58.7	52.9	49.4	62.4
Mean monthly sunshine hours	344.1	285.3	272.8	219.0	170.5	144.0	164.3	189.1	213.0	269.7	300.0	334.8	2,906.6
Mean daily sunshine hours	11.1	10.1	8.8	7.3	5.5	4.8	5.3	6.1	7.1	8.7	10.0	10.8	8.0
Percentage possible sunshine	65.0	66.0	69.0	59.0	49.0	43.5	45.0	54.5	56.0	60.0	63.0	62.0	57.7
Source 1: Servicio Meteorológico Nacional
Source 2: Secretaria de Mineria (percent sun 1971–1990)

Climate data for Viedma agricultural experimental station (1965–2017)
Month	Jan	Feb	Mar	Apr	May	Jun	Jul	Aug	Sep	Oct	Nov	Dec	Year
Record high °C (°F)	45.1 (113.2)	42.8 (109.0)	37.1 (98.8)	33.6 (92.5)	29.7 (85.5)	25.7 (78.3)	24.3 (75.7)	29.9 (85.8)	31.3 (88.3)	34.2 (93.6)	39.0 (102.2)	41.8 (107.2)	45.1 (113.2)
Mean daily maximum °C (°F)	28.9 (84.0)	27.9 (82.2)	25.1 (77.2)	20.8 (69.4)	16.4 (61.5)	13.1 (55.6)	13.0 (55.4)	15.2 (59.4)	17.8 (64.0)	21.1 (70.0)	24.7 (76.5)	27.3 (81.1)	20.9 (69.6)
Daily mean °C (°F)	21.4 (70.5)	20.3 (68.5)	18.0 (64.4)	14.1 (57.4)	10.3 (50.5)	7.4 (45.3)	7.1 (44.8)	8.5 (47.3)	10.8 (51.4)	14.1 (57.4)	17.4 (63.3)	19.8 (67.6)	14.1 (57.4)
Mean daily minimum °C (°F)	14.2 (57.6)	13.7 (56.7)	11.7 (53.1)	7.7 (45.9)	5.1 (41.2)	2.7 (36.9)	2.1 (35.8)	2.7 (36.9)	4.4 (39.9)	7.3 (45.1)	10.4 (50.7)	12.8 (55.0)	7.9 (46.2)
Record low °C (°F)	0.9 (33.6)	2.2 (36.0)	−0.5 (31.1)	−3.2 (26.2)	−7.2 (19.0)	−7.0 (19.4)	−9.9 (14.2)	−7.4 (18.7)	−6.2 (20.8)	−4.4 (24.1)	−1.7 (28.9)	1.0 (33.8)	−9.9 (14.2)
Average precipitation mm (inches)	31.8 (1.25)	44.1 (1.74)	51.7 (2.04)	37.9 (1.49)	31.7 (1.25)	25.7 (1.01)	31.3 (1.23)	25.1 (0.99)	23.8 (0.94)	33.3 (1.31)	27.9 (1.10)	31.3 (1.23)	395.5 (15.57)
Average precipitation days	5.4	5.5	6.5	6.4	7.8	8.1	7.5	5.2	4.7	6.7	4.9	6.1	74.7
Average relative humidity (%)	56.8	60.1	66.3	69.4	74.8	77.5	75.4	68.3	64.0	62.1	57.7	55.4	65.7
Source: Instituto Nacional de Tecnología Agropecuaria

== Transport ==
The Gobernador Castello Airport (IATA: VDM, ICAO: SAVV) serves flights to Buenos Aires, Neuquén, Bariloche, Puerto Madryn, Trelew, Comodoro Rivadavia, Mar del Plata, and other cities in Argentina. It is located 6 km from the city, and has an average annual traffic of 30,000 passengers. 30 km downstream from Viedma, on the Atlantic shore, the El Cóndor beach resort town (Balneario Massini) is the most visited tourist beach in the area. The Servicios Ferroviarios Patagónico connect with San Carlos de Bariloche.

== Notable people ==
- Valentina Cámara (born 1993), footballer
- Carlos Casamiquela (1948–2020), agricultural engineer
- Gastón Cellerino (born 1986), footballer
- Segundo Cernadas (born 1972), actor
- Agustín Curruhinca (born 2000), footballer
- Juan Manuel Martínez (born 1985), footballer
- Nicolás Martínez (born 1987), footballer
- Bruno Sepúlveda (born 1992), footballer
- Fabio Vázquez (born 1994), footballer
- José Vivanco (born 1998), footballer
- Juan Edmundo Vecchi (1931–2002), Catholic priest

== See also ==
- Buenos Aires Great Southern Railway
- Ferrocarril General Roca
- Servicios Ferroviarios Patagónico
