= Nahuel Pájaro =

Argentine footballer

Personal information
- Full name: Nahuel Pájaro
- Date of birth: 9 May 1997 (age 29)
- Place of birth: Mar del Plata, Argentina
- Position: Midfielder

Youth career
- 2005–2016: Aldosivi

Senior career*
Years	Team	Apps	(Gls)
2016–2018	Aldosivi	4	(0)
2018	→ San Telmo (loan)	1	(0)
2019–2021	Círculo Deportivo	45	(1)
2021	Estudiantes de Olavarría	4	(0)
2022	Atlético Boxing Club	4	(1)
- * Club domestic league appearances and goals as of 07:08, 20 August 2022 (UTC)

Nahuel Pájaro (born 9 May 1997) is an Argentine professional footballer who plays as a midfielder.

== Career ==
Pájaro began in the youth ranks of Aldosivi at the age of eight, eleven years later he was promoted into the club's first-team. His debut came on 3 February 2016 in a 1–1 draw against Newell's Old Boys during the 2016 Argentine Primera División season. He made three further appearances in 2016. However, Pájaro appeared in zero matches for Aldosivi during 2016–17 as the team were relegated to Primera B Nacional. He joined Primera B Metropolitana side San Telmo on loan in February 2018.

In November 2021, Pájaro signed for Estudiantes de Olavarría.

== Career statistics ==
As of 7 September 2018.

Club statistics
Club	Season	League			Cup (Note: Includes the Copa Argentina)		League Cup		Continental (Note: Includes the Copa Libertadores and Copa Sudamericana)		Other		Total	
Club	Season	Division	Apps	Goals	Apps	Goals	Apps	Goals	Apps	Goals	Apps	Goals	Apps	Goals
Aldosivi	2016	Primera División	4	0	0	0	—		—		0	0	4	0
Aldosivi	2016–17	Primera División	0	0	0	0	—		—		0	0	0	0
Aldosivi	2017–18	Primera B Nacional	0	0	0	0	—		—		0	0	0	0
Aldosivi	2018–19	Primera División	0	0	0	0	—		—		0	0	0	0
Aldosivi	Total		4	0	0	0	—		—		0	0	4	0
San Telmo (loan)	2017–18	Primera B Metropolitana	1	0	0	0	—		—		0	0	1	0
Career total			5	0	0	0	—		—		0	0	5	0
