= General Conesa, Río Negro =

Coordinates: 40°06′S 64°25′W

General Conesa (Río Negro)
- Municipality and village
- Interactive map of General Conesa (Río Negro)
- Country: Argentina
- Province: Río Negro Province
- Time zone: UTC−3 (ART)
- Climate: BSk

General Conesa (Río Negro) is a village and municipality in Río Negro Province in Argentina. It is also the antipode to Beijing, China.

== Geography ==
=== Climate ===
Climate data for General Conesa, Río Negro (1941–1960)
Month	Jan	Feb	Mar	Apr	May	Jun	Jul	Aug	Sep	Oct	Nov	Dec	Year
Record high °C (°F)	42.0 (107.6)	42.0 (107.6)	39.0 (102.2)	35.0 (95.0)	27.0 (80.6)	24.0 (75.2)	23.5 (74.3)	27.6 (81.7)	31.4 (88.5)	35.2 (95.4)	39.5 (103.1)	41.0 (105.8)	42.0 (107.6)
Mean daily maximum °C (°F)	31.5 (88.7)	29.7 (85.5)	26.9 (80.4)	21.9 (71.4)	17.1 (62.8)	13.5 (56.3)	13.5 (56.3)	15.8 (60.4)	18.7 (65.7)	23.3 (73.9)	27.6 (81.7)	29.8 (85.6)	22.4 (72.3)
Daily mean °C (°F)	23.6 (74.5)	22.1 (71.8)	19.0 (66.2)	14.5 (58.1)	10.4 (50.7)	7.2 (45.0)	6.8 (44.2)	8.6 (47.5)	11.5 (52.7)	15.8 (60.4)	19.9 (67.8)	22.4 (72.3)	15.2 (59.4)
Mean daily minimum °C (°F)	15.2 (59.4)	14.0 (57.2)	11.5 (52.7)	7.5 (45.5)	4.6 (40.3)	1.8 (35.2)	1.0 (33.8)	2.0 (35.6)	5.0 (41.0)	8.2 (46.8)	11.5 (52.7)	14.2 (57.6)	8.0 (46.4)
Record low °C (°F)	4.0 (39.2)	2.4 (36.3)	−0.1 (31.8)	−3.5 (25.7)	−7.6 (18.3)	−9.0 (15.8)	−12.9 (8.8)	−7.6 (18.3)	−5.5 (22.1)	−8.4 (16.9)	−1.9 (28.6)	−0.2 (31.6)	−12.9 (8.8)
Average precipitation mm (inches)	19.8 (0.78)	23.2 (0.91)	33.5 (1.32)	17.6 (0.69)	26.6 (1.05)	16.2 (0.64)	22.0 (0.87)	8.5 (0.33)	25.2 (0.99)	23.8 (0.94)	18.0 (0.71)	24.8 (0.98)	259.2 (10.20)
Average relative humidity (%)	43.0	48.0	58.0	63.0	72.0	77.5	73.0	61.0	58.5	53.0	50.5	45.5	58.6
Source: Secretaria de Mineria
