= Veinticinco de Mayo Department, Río Negro =

Veinticinco de Mayo Departamento Veinticinco de Mayo
- Department
- Location of Veinticinco de Mayo within Río Negro
- Country: Argentina
- Province: Río Negro
- Seat: Maquinchao

Area
  - Total: 27,106 km^{2} (10,466 sq mi)

Population (2022)
  - Total: 16,718
  - Density: 0.61676/km^{2} (1.5974/sq mi)

Veinticinco de Mayo is a department of the province of Río Negro (Argentina). Its name translates to "Twenty Fifth of May," a national holiday in Argentina cellabrating the May Revolution.
