= Maquinchao =

- Town
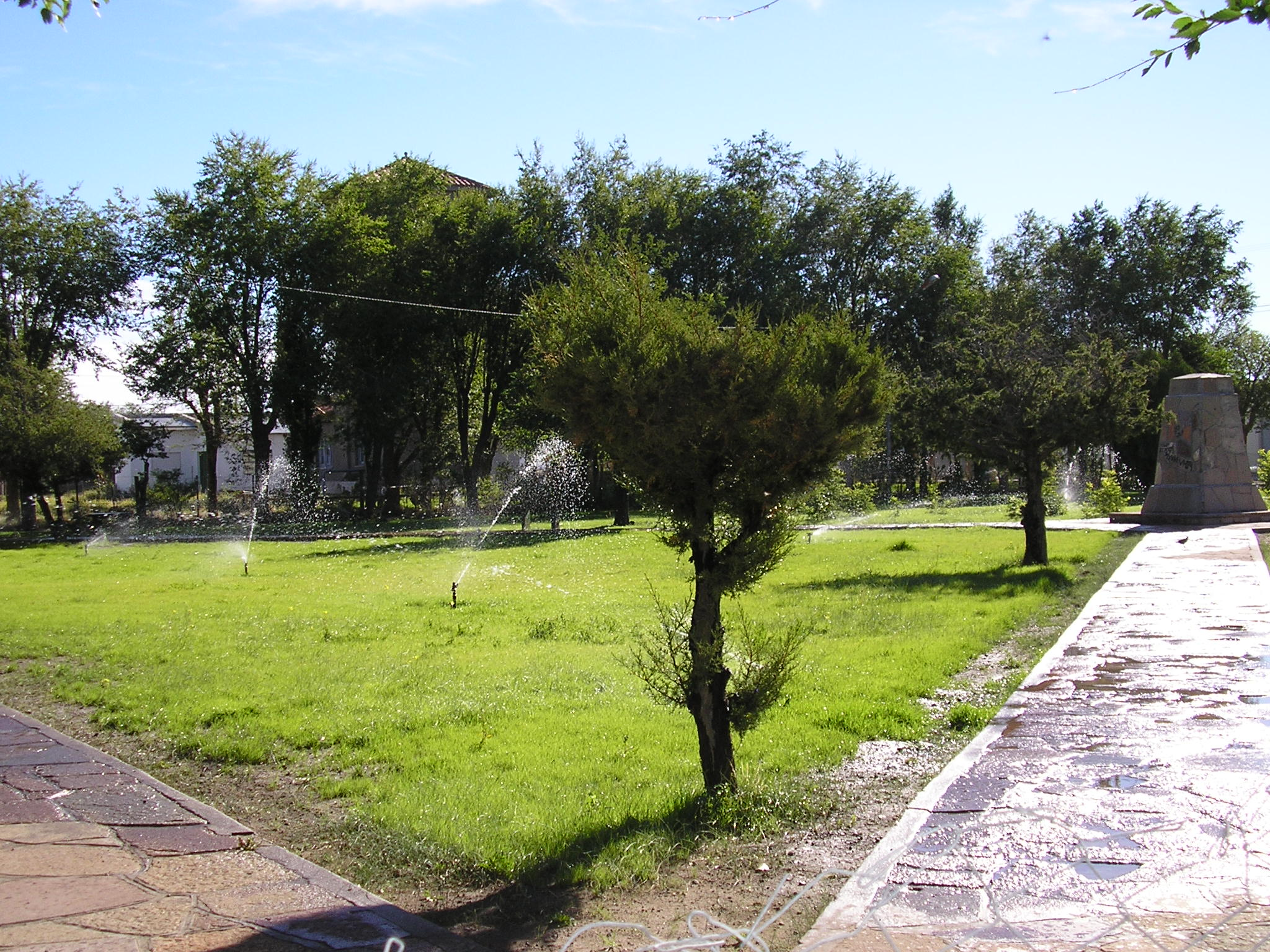
- Plaza Sarmiento, Maquinchao

- Location of Maquinchao in Argentina
- Coordinates: 41°15′S 68°42′W
- Country: Argentina
- Province: Río Negro Province
- Department: Veinticinco de Mayo Department, Río Negro
- Elevation: 888 m (2,913 ft)

Population (2010)
  - Total: 2,494
- Time zone: UTC−3 (ART)
- Climate: BSk

Maquinchao is a village and municipality in Río Negro Province in Argentina.

== Geography ==
=== Climate ===
This town is located in the middle of northern Patagonia, right in the steppe. Combined with its far distance from open ocean, Maquinchao has one of the most continental variations of a cold semi-arid climate (BSk, according to the Köppen climate classification) in the country, bordering on a cold arid climate (BWk) and it can be quite extreme: temperatures can range from well above 35 °C or 95 °F on the hottest summer days (but with cold, desert nights at around 10 °C or 50 °F) to lows that might reach −25 °C or −13 °F. Usually, summer days average 26 °C or 78.8 °F and nights 9 °C or 48.2 °F, whereas winter days average 6 °C or 42.8 °F and nights, −5 °C or 23 °F. Snow is common, but since precipitation is generally low, quantities tend to be reduced. The weather is generally windy, especially in the spring.

Climate data for Maquinchao (1991–2020, extremes 1941–present) (Note: The record highs and lows are based on the INTA link for the period 1941–1990 while records beyond 1990 come from the Servicio Meteorológico Nacional link since it only covers from 1961 to present. As such, the extremes span a period from 1941 to present when these two sources are used together)
Month	Jan	Feb	Mar	Apr	May	Jun	Jul	Aug	Sep	Oct	Nov	Dec	Year
Record high °C (°F)	39.0 (102.2)	38.0 (100.4)	36.0 (96.8)	30.0 (86.0)	24.0 (75.2)	21.0 (69.8)	18.0 (64.4)	21.8 (71.2)	28.0 (82.4)	32.0 (89.6)	35.6 (96.1)	37.0 (98.6)	39.0 (102.2)
Mean daily maximum °C (°F)	26.7 (80.1)	25.7 (78.3)	22.3 (72.1)	16.6 (61.9)	11.3 (52.3)	7.1 (44.8)	6.2 (43.2)	9.6 (49.3)	13.1 (55.6)	16.9 (62.4)	20.8 (69.4)	24.4 (75.9)	16.7 (62.1)
Daily mean °C (°F)	18.6 (65.5)	17.5 (63.5)	14.2 (57.6)	8.9 (48.0)	4.8 (40.6)	1.8 (35.2)	0.6 (33.1)	2.8 (37.0)	5.7 (42.3)	9.6 (49.3)	13.3 (55.9)	16.6 (61.9)	9.5 (49.1)
Mean daily minimum °C (°F)	9.6 (49.3)	9.1 (48.4)	6.5 (43.7)	2.4 (36.3)	−0.6 (30.9)	−2.8 (27.0)	−4.4 (24.1)	−2.8 (27.0)	−1.0 (30.2)	2.3 (36.1)	5.5 (41.9)	7.9 (46.2)	2.6 (36.7)
Record low °C (°F)	−3.4 (25.9)	−3.7 (25.3)	−6.2 (20.8)	−12.2 (10.0)	−18.3 (−0.9)	−25.6 (−14.1)	−35.3 (−31.5)	−18.7 (−1.7)	−13.8 (7.2)	−10.8 (12.6)	−6.2 (20.8)	−4.3 (24.3)	−35.3 (−31.5)
Average precipitation mm (inches)	12.4 (0.49)	14.7 (0.58)	20.1 (0.79)	14.8 (0.58)	26.2 (1.03)	16.3 (0.64)	20.1 (0.79)	12.8 (0.50)	11.6 (0.46)	12.8 (0.50)	12.8 (0.50)	13.8 (0.54)	188.2 (7.41)
Average rainfall mm (inches)	12.4 (0.49)	14.7 (0.58)	20.1 (0.79)	14.5 (0.57)	25.2 (0.99)	15.3 (0.60)	17.1 (0.67)	10.8 (0.43)	10.6 (0.42)	12.1 (0.48)	12.8 (0.50)	13.8 (0.54)	179.4 (7.06)
Average snowfall cm (inches)	0.0 (0.0)	0.0 (0.0)	0.0 (0.0)	0.1 (0.0)	1.0 (0.4)	1.0 (0.4)	3.0 (1.2)	2.0 (0.8)	1.0 (0.4)	0.7 (0.3)	0.0 (0.0)	0.0 (0.0)	8.8 (3.5)
Average rainy days	2.8	2.4	3.4	3.6	5.2	5.6	5.2	4.8	4.2	3.8	2.4	2.8	46.2
Average snowy days	0.0	0.0	0.0	0.1	0.3	3.0	2.0	1.0	0.9	0.0	0.0	0.0	7.3
Average relative humidity (%)	44.1	47.9	53.4	60.9	68.8	72.4	71.0	66.4	59.0	54.1	48.9	46.5	57.8
Source 1: Servicio Meteorológico Nacional
Source 2: Instituto Nacional de Tecnología Agropecuaria (precipitation, rainfall, snow, and extremes 1941–1990),
