= El Cuy =

Coordinates: 39°56′S 68°20′W

- Municipality and village
- Interactive map of El Cuy
- Country: Argentina
- Province: Río Negro Province
- Time zone: UTC−3 (ART)
- Climate: BWk

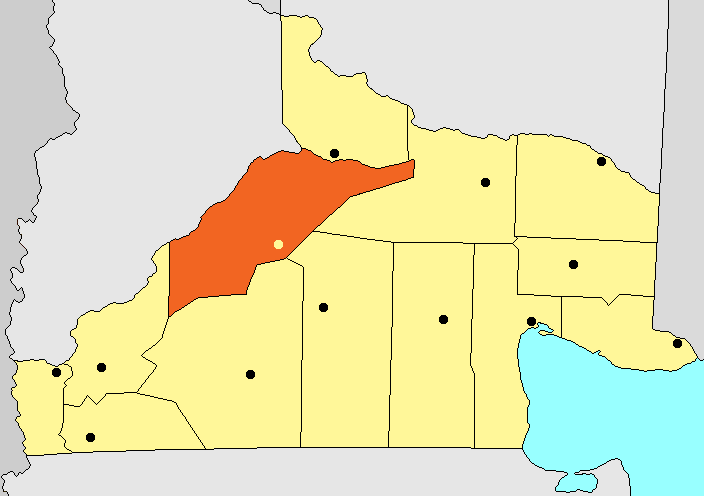
Map

El Cuy is a village and municipality in Río Negro Province in Argentina.

== Geography ==
=== Climate ===
Climate data for El Cuy, Río Negro (1976–1994)
Month	Jan	Feb	Mar	Apr	May	Jun	Jul	Aug	Sep	Oct	Nov	Dec	Year
Record high °C (°F)	39.0 (102.2)	38.5 (101.3)	36.0 (96.8)	30.0 (86.0)	24.0 (75.2)	27.0 (80.6)	18.2 (64.8)	25.0 (77.0)	26.5 (79.7)	31.5 (88.7)	35.0 (95.0)	36.0 (96.8)	39.0 (102.2)
Mean daily maximum °C (°F)	28.0 (82.4)	27.2 (81.0)	23.7 (74.7)	18.4 (65.1)	13.3 (55.9)	10.2 (50.4)	9.2 (48.6)	11.6 (52.9)	13.9 (57.0)	17.6 (63.7)	21.7 (71.1)	23.8 (74.8)	18.2 (64.8)
Daily mean °C (°F)	21.6 (70.9)	20.2 (68.4)	17.9 (64.2)	12.5 (54.5)	8.3 (46.9)	5.9 (42.6)	5.0 (41.0)	6.2 (43.2)	8.9 (48.0)	12.2 (54.0)	17.2 (63.0)	19.6 (67.3)	13.0 (55.4)
Mean daily minimum °C (°F)	9.9 (49.8)	9.5 (49.1)	7.3 (45.1)	4.4 (39.9)	1.6 (34.9)	0.0 (32.0)	−0.2 (31.6)	1.0 (33.8)	2.0 (35.6)	5.1 (41.2)	7.0 (44.6)	8.1 (46.6)	4.6 (40.3)
Record low °C (°F)	0.0 (32.0)	−1.0 (30.2)	−1.0 (30.2)	−6.0 (21.2)	−11.0 (12.2)	−13.0 (8.6)	−15.0 (5.0)	−12.0 (10.4)	−10.0 (14.0)	−5.0 (23.0)	−8.0 (17.6)	0.0 (32.0)	−15.0 (5.0)
Average precipitation mm (inches)	14.4 (0.57)	19.0 (0.75)	25.8 (1.02)	15.1 (0.59)	17.1 (0.67)	18.2 (0.72)	17.0 (0.67)	12.4 (0.49)	13.3 (0.52)	17.4 (0.69)	17.6 (0.69)	19.9 (0.78)	207.2 (8.16)
Average rainy days	2.0	2.1	2.1	3.3	2.5	2.8	2.7	2.5	2.5	2.4	2.6	2.5	30.0
Source: Instituto Nacional de Tecnología Agropecuaria
