= Río Negro Province =

Province of Argentina

Río Negro
- Province
- Province of Río Negro; Provincia de Río Negro (Spanish)
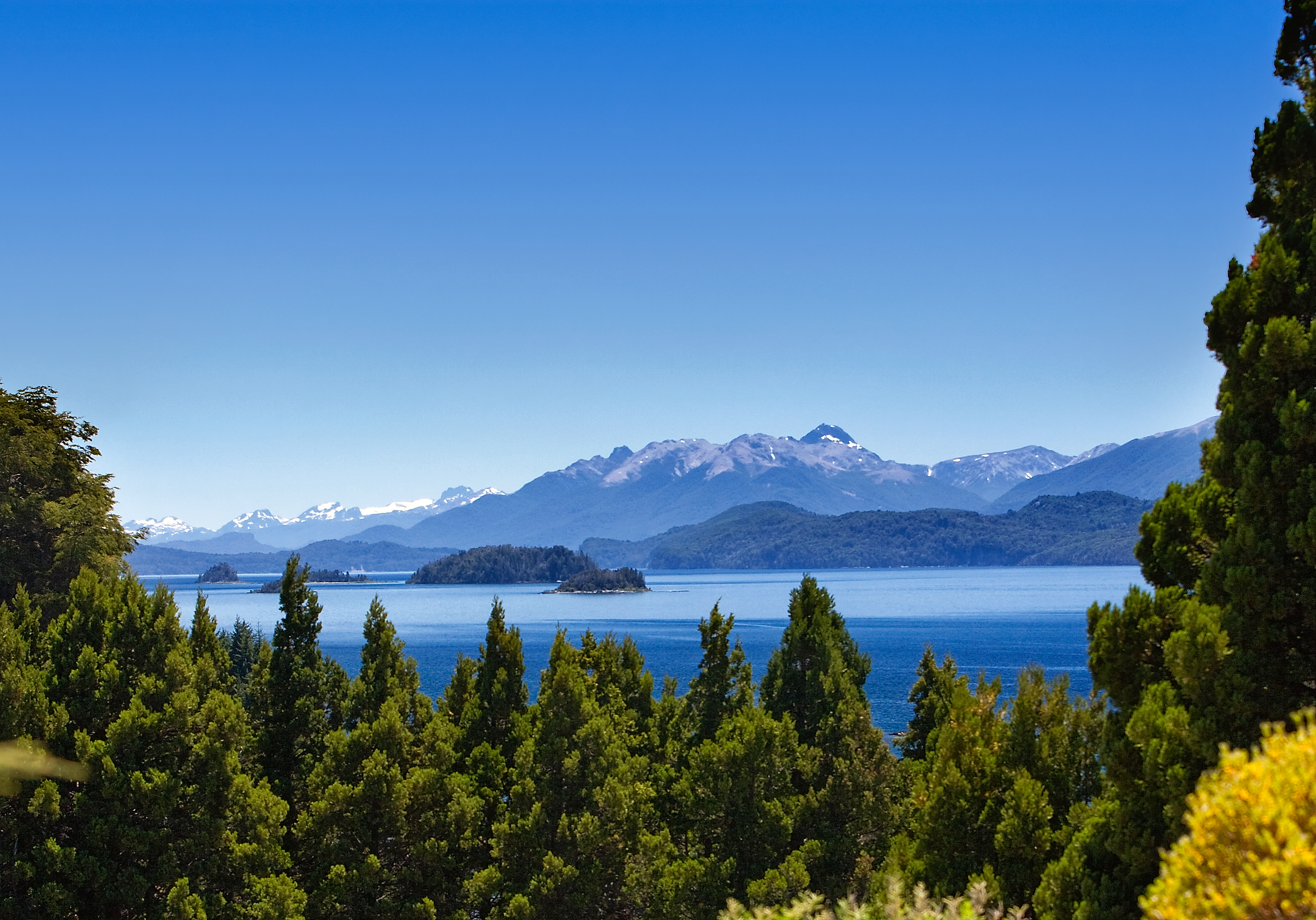
- View of Nahuel Huapi Lake

- Flag Seal

- Coordinates: 40°48′S 63°00′W
- Country: Argentina
- Capital: Viedma
- Divisions: 13 departments

Government
  - Governor: Alberto Weretilneck (JSRN)
  - Vice Governor: Pedro Oscar Pesatti (PJ)
  - Legislature: 46
  - National Deputies: 5
  - National Senators: Claudio Doñate (UP); Silvina García Larraburu (UP); Mónica Silva (JSRN)

Area
  - Total: 203,013 km^{2} (78,384 sq mi)

Population (2022 census)
  - Total: 750,768
  - Rank: 15th
  - Density: 3.69813/km^{2} (9.57811/sq mi)
- Demonym: Rionegrino

GDP
  - Total: peso 111 billion (US$6.7 billion) (2018)
- Time zone: ART
- ISO 3166 code: AR-R
- HDI (2021): 0.844 very high (7th)
- Website: rionegro.gov.ar

Río Negro (Spanish pronunciation: [ˈri.o ˈneɣɾo], Black River) is a province of Argentina, located in northern Patagonia. Neighboring provinces are from the south clockwise Chubut, Neuquén, Mendoza, La Pampa and Buenos Aires. To the east lies the Atlantic Ocean.

Its capital is Viedma near the Atlantic outlet of the province's namesake river in the eastern extreme. The largest city is Bariloche in the far west in the Andean foothills. Other important cities include General Roca and Cipolletti.

== History ==
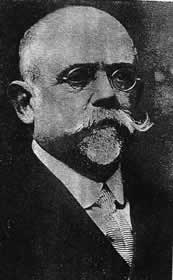
Francisco Moreno, a prominent explorer and academic.

Ferdinand Magellan was the first European explorer to visit the coasts of the provinces in 1520. Italian priest Nicolás Mascardi founded the Jesuit mission Nuestra Señora de Nahuel Huapi in 1670 at the shore of the Nahuel Huapi Lake, at the feet of the Andes range.

Originally part of the Argentine territory called Patagonia (in 1878 the Gobernación de la Patagonia), in 1884 it was organised into the Territorio Nacional del Río Negro and General Lorenzo Vintter was appointed as the territory's first governor. It was only in 1957, that Río Negro acquired status of a province; its first provincial governor was Edgardo Castello of the Radical Civic Union (UCR).

== Geography ==
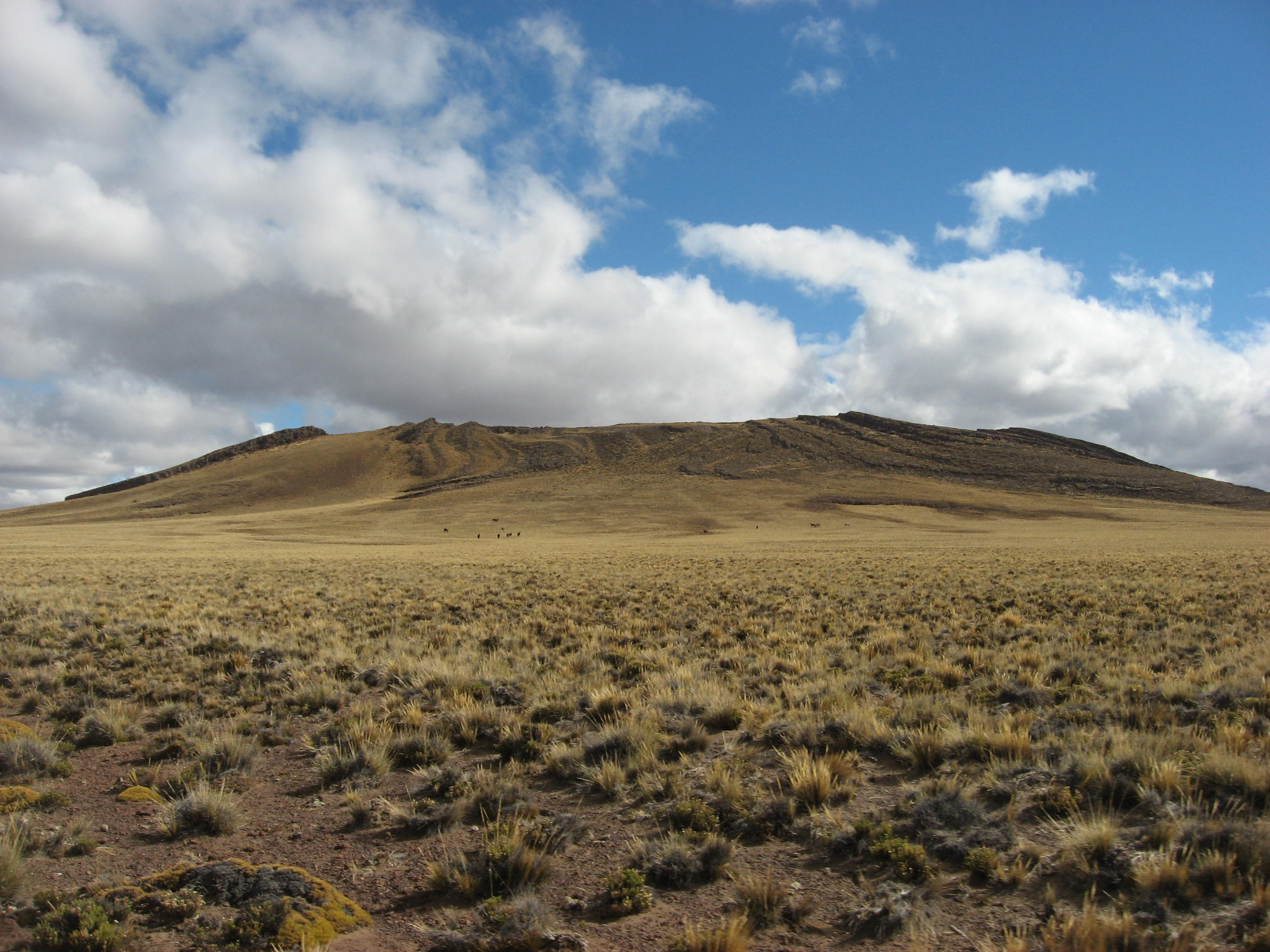
The Somuncurá Plateau.

Río Negro is one of the five provinces that make up Argentine Patagonia (together with the most southern partido of Buenos Aires Province - Patagones Partido). It is bounded to the north by the Colorado River which separates it from La Pampa Province, to the east by the Atlantic Ocean and to the west by the Andes and the Limay River (serves as the natural border with Neuquén Province). The 42nd parallel south marks the southern limit of the province. With an area of 203,013 square kilometres (78,383.8 sq mi), it is the 4th largest province by area.

=== Climate ===
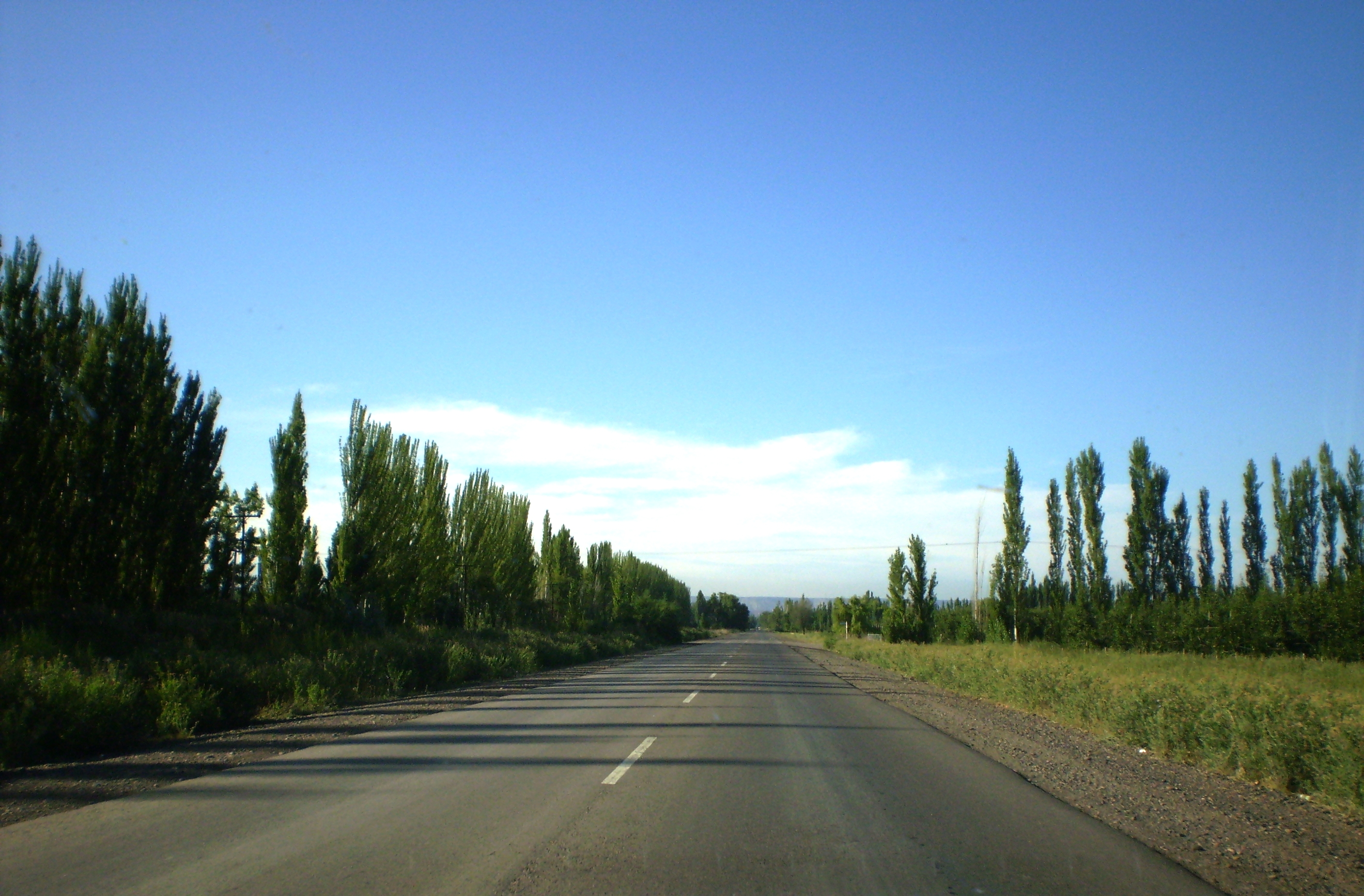
Roadside scenery along the Upper Valley of the Río Negro ("Black River").

The climate of the province is temperate at low elevations, and very cold in the higher Andean peaks.

==== Temperature ====
The mean annual temperatures in the province are relatively cold for its latitude owing to the marine currents to the east and higher altitude to the west. Mean annual temperatures in the province can vary, depending on altitude and distance from the sea. The northern parts of the province are the warmest, with a mean annual temperature of more than 15 °C (59.0 °F) while the coldest areas are found in the Cordillera where the mean annual temperatures are less than 10 °C (50.0 °F). At the highest peaks, the mean annual temperature is less than freezing. Summer temperatures can exceed 40 °C (104.0 °F) although the mean January temperatures range from 20 to 24 °C (68.0 to 75.2 °F). In contrast, the Andean region has milder summers with mean January temperatures of 15 °C (59.0 °F) or less, depending on the altitude. In July, mean temperatures range from 7 to 8 °C (44.6 to 46.4 °F) on the coast in the north to around 2 to 3 °C (35.6 to 37.4 °F) in the central plateau.

==== Humidity and precipitation ====
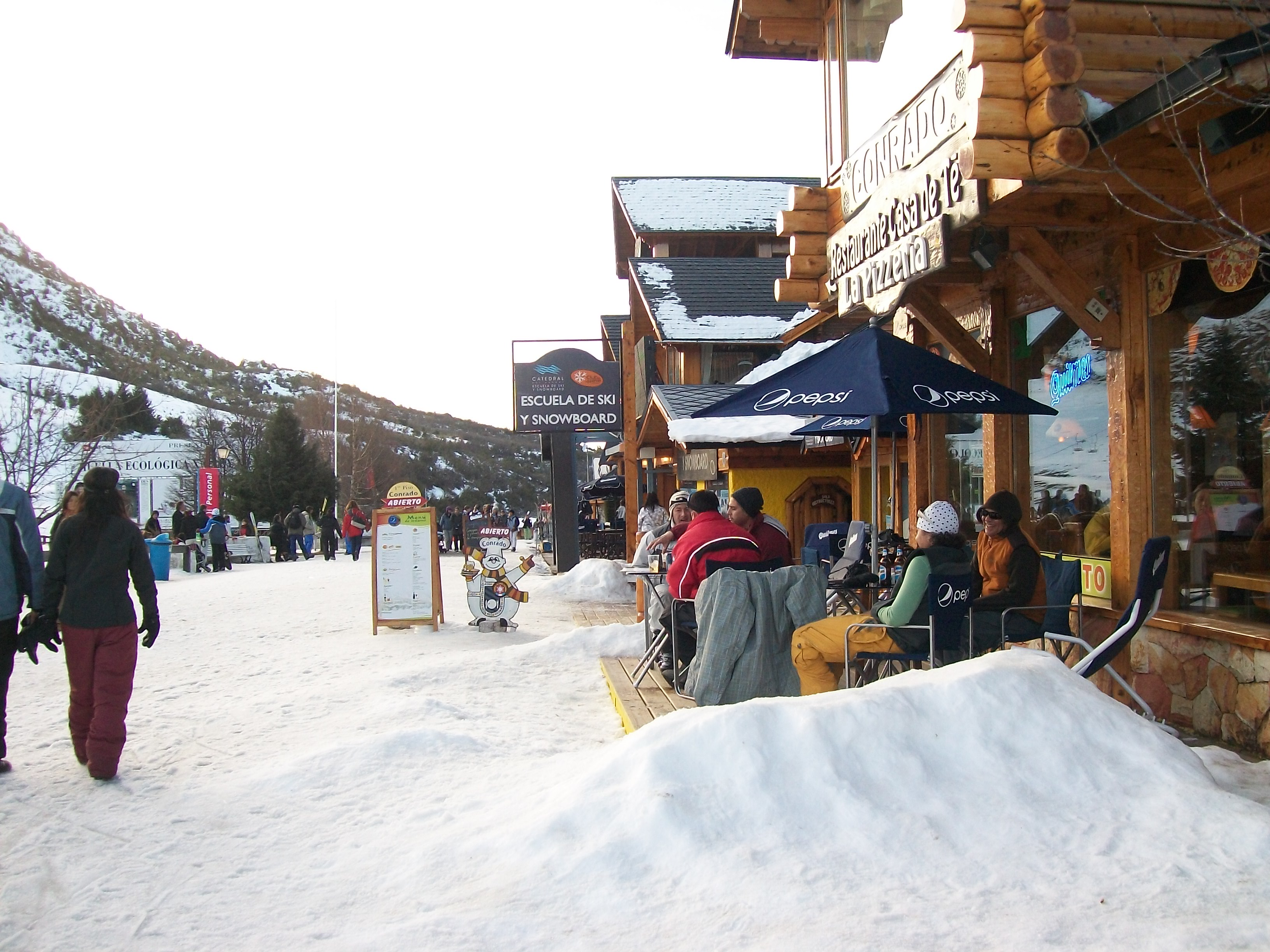
Snow in Villa Cerro Catedral.

Köppen classification map for the province of Río Negro

Relative humidity is lower in the central plateau where they average 50%. Along the coastal regions, humidity is higher with a mean annual humidity of 60% while the Andean region has the highest humidity with an average annual humidity exceeding 65% due to the lower temperatures there. In all locations, humidity is lower in the summer and higher in the winter owing to the higher temperatures in the summer.

The Andes block most of the moisture from the Pacific Ocean from coming in, causing it to release most of the precipitation on its western slopes and as such, most of the province is dry, with a mean annual precipitation around 200 millimetres (8 in). Coastal areas and northern parts of the province receive a slightly higher precipitation, where it can average above 300 millimetres (12 in) a year. The Andean region receives the most precipitation with areas receiving a mean annual precipitation of 200 to 1,000 millimetres (8 to 39 in) in which the precipitation gradient is very strong and increases westwards. In some places, precipitation can exceed 3,000 millimetres (118 in) a year. Most of the Andean region has a rainfall pattern that is Mediterranean like, similar to Central Chile in which most of the precipitation falls during the winter months and summers are dry.

==== Wind and sunshine ====
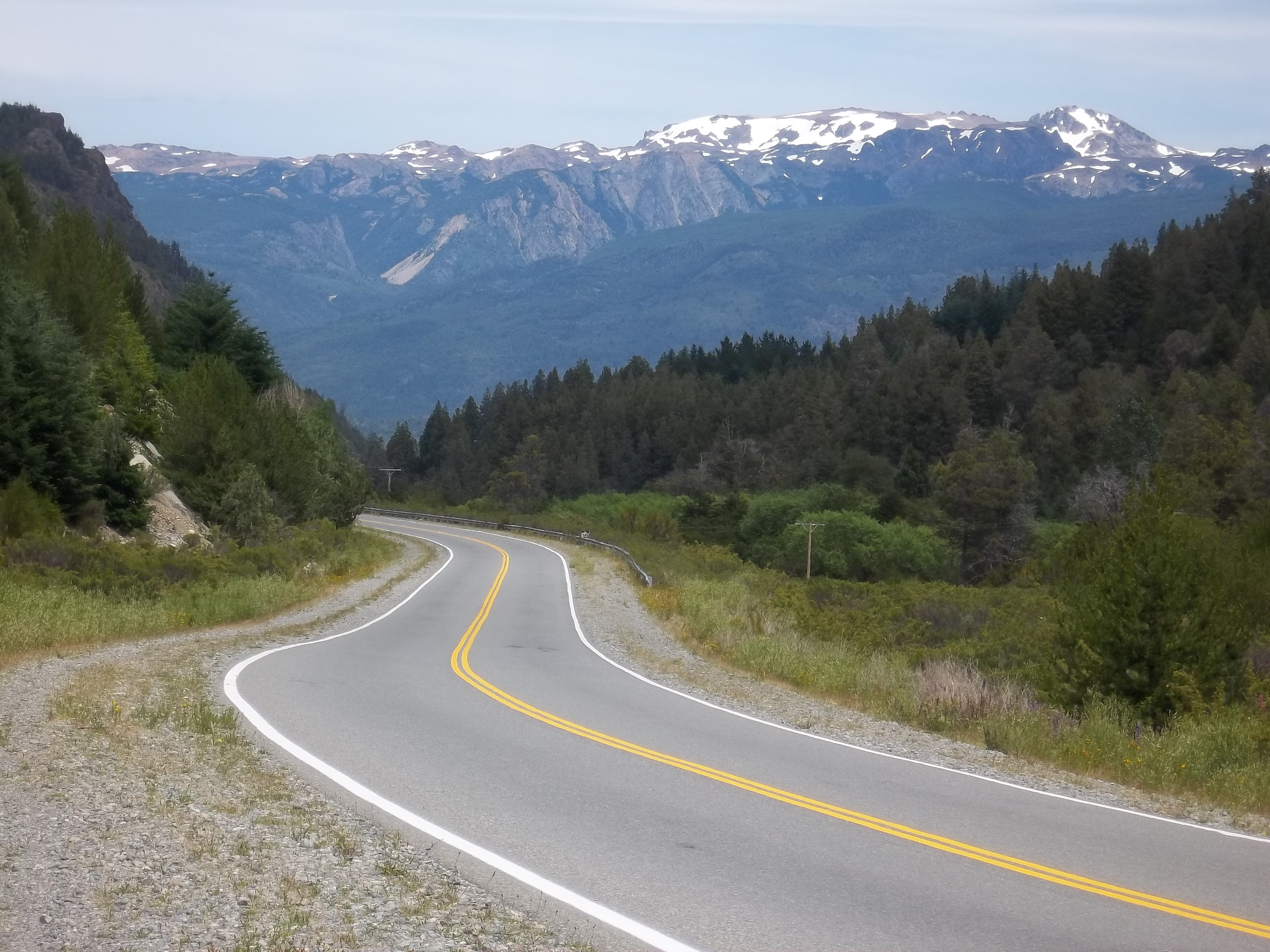
National Route 40 near Bariloche.

One dominant characteristic of the climate is the strong winds that are observed throughout the province. Summers tend to be windier than winters. Winds coming from the west, southwest and northwest are common, occurring 50% of the time (60% if calm winds are not included). There is some tendency for the winds to come from the east, particularly on the coastal regions when sea breezes from the east can occur when westerly winds are weak, which can be felt up to 10 kilometres (6.2 mi) from the coast. The mean wind speed throughout the province varies with the northern parts having the lowest wind speeds while the highest altitude areas being the windiest. Except for the northern parts of the province, mean annual wind speeds exceed 4 metres per second (13 ft/s).

Cloud cover varies throughout the province, ranging from more than 60% in the Andean region to about 40% in the coastal areas. The central plateaus have intermediate amounts of cloud cover between these 2 regions. As such, the Andean region is cloudier than the rest of the province. Sunshine ranges from 10–11 hours of sunshine/day in January to about 5 hours of sunshine/day (less cloudier areas) to less than 3 hours of sunshine/day (more cloudier areas) in July.

== Demographics ==
Historical population
Year	Pop.	±%
1895	9,241	—
1914	42,242	+357.1%
1947	134,350	+218.0%
1960	193,292	+43.9%
1970	262,622	+35.9%
1980	383,354	+46.0%
1991	506,772	+32.2%
2001	552,822	+9.1%
2010	638,645	+15.5%
2022	750,768	+17.6%

Ethnical groups in Río Negro (2022 census)
1. Undeclared (92.9%)
2. Native (6.40%)
3. Black (0.70%)

According to the results from the 2010 census [INDEC], the province had a population of 638,645 with 316,774 males and 321,871 females. It constituted 1.6% of the total population in Argentina. This represented a 15.5% increase in the population compared to 2001 census [INDEC] which had 552,822 inhabitants. Amongst of all the provinces in Patagonia (Note: Argentine Patagonia includes the provinces of Río Negro, Neuquén, Chubut, Santa Cruz, and Tierra del Fuego), it is the most populous, containing 30.4% of the total population in Patagonia. The province's population rose to 750,768 at the 2022 Census.

The province is home to four indigenous groups: The Tehuelches, the Puelches, the Pehuenches, and the Mapuches. Almost all of the indigenous population in the province are the Mapuches with the rest being small in number where their few descendants live in the neighbouring provinces. The Mapuches along with some of the Pehuenches originally lived in the western parts of the province although today, they mainly live in the southern parts of the province. The Tehuelches were nomadic people that hunted on the steppes in the province. The Puelches, being also nomadic, lived on the northern margins of Nahuel Huapi Lake and the surrounding forests in the Andean mountains, living off hunting and fishing. It was previously thought that Mapuches started coming to the region before 1880 from Chile, leading to the imposition of their culture onto the other indigenous groups. However, archaeological research has shown the existence of the Mapuche people in the Argentine provinces long before the arrival of the European conquerors. Originally agricultural people, the Mapuches became nomadic upon arrival in the province due to the utilization of horses.

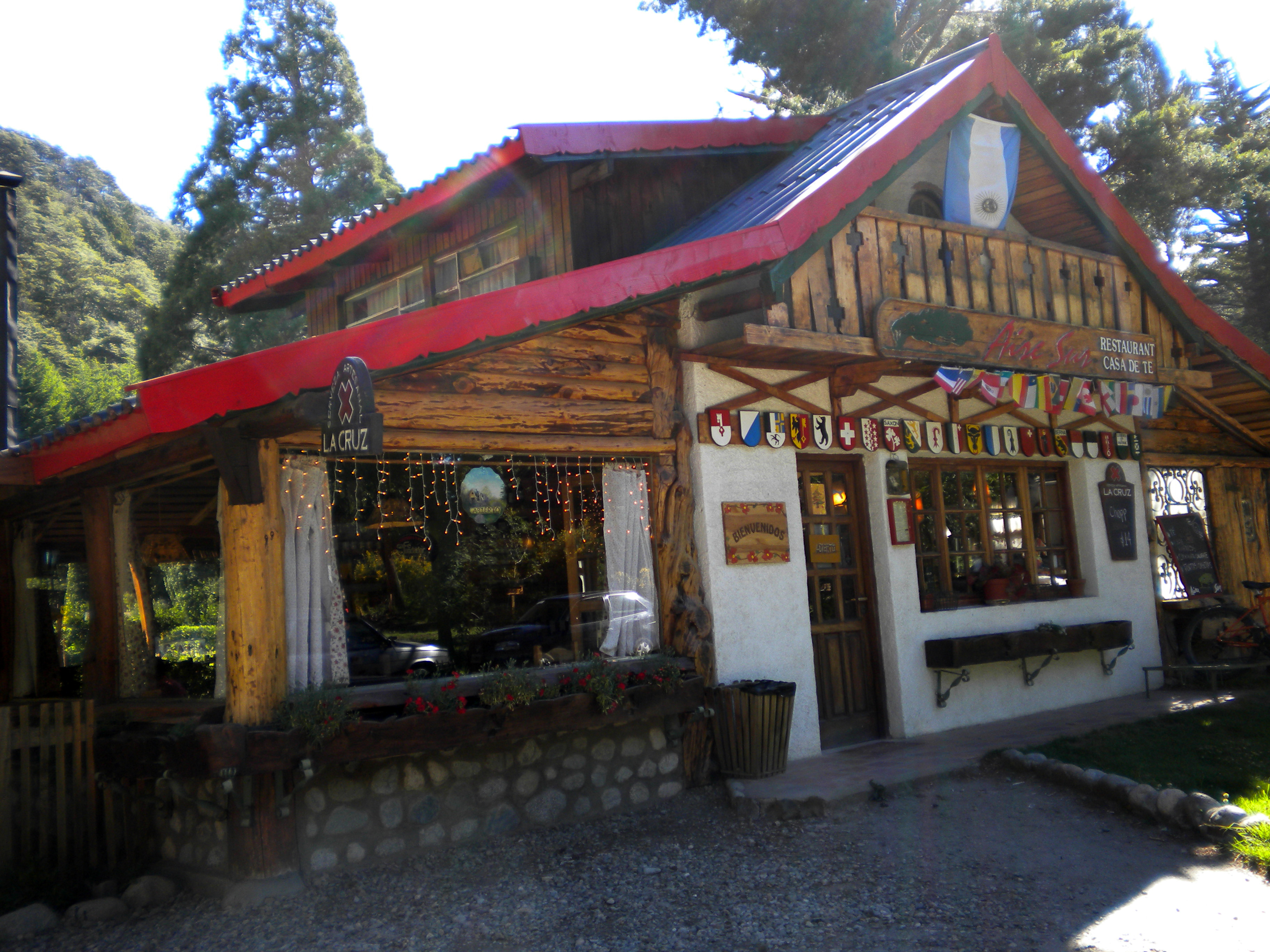
Tea House in Colonia Suiza.

The province received immigrants mostly from Chile, Italy, Switzerland, Spain, Germany and the United Kingdom during the last years of the 19th century and the first years of the 20th century.

== Government ==
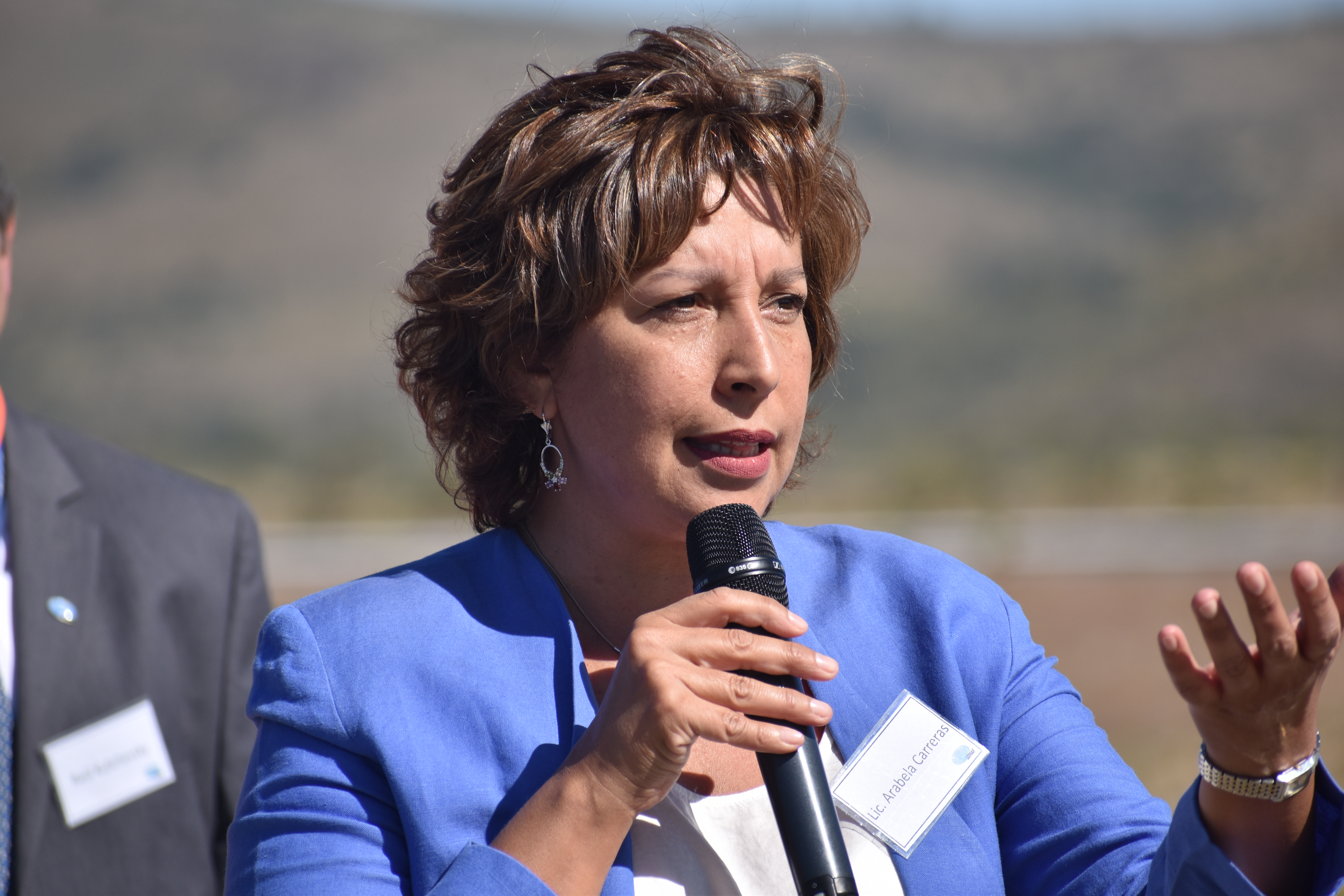
Governor Arabella Carreras

The provincial government is divided into the usual three branches: the executive, headed by a popularly elected governor, who appoints the cabinet; the legislative; and the judiciary, headed by the Supreme Court.

As of December 2019, Arabela Carreras became governor of the province, following the retirement of Alberto Weretilneck due to term-limit. She is the first woman elected governor of the province.

The Constitution of Río Negro Province forms the formal law of the province.

In Argentina, the most important law enforcement organization is the Argentine Federal Police but the additional work is carried out by the Río Negro Provincial Police.

== Political division ==
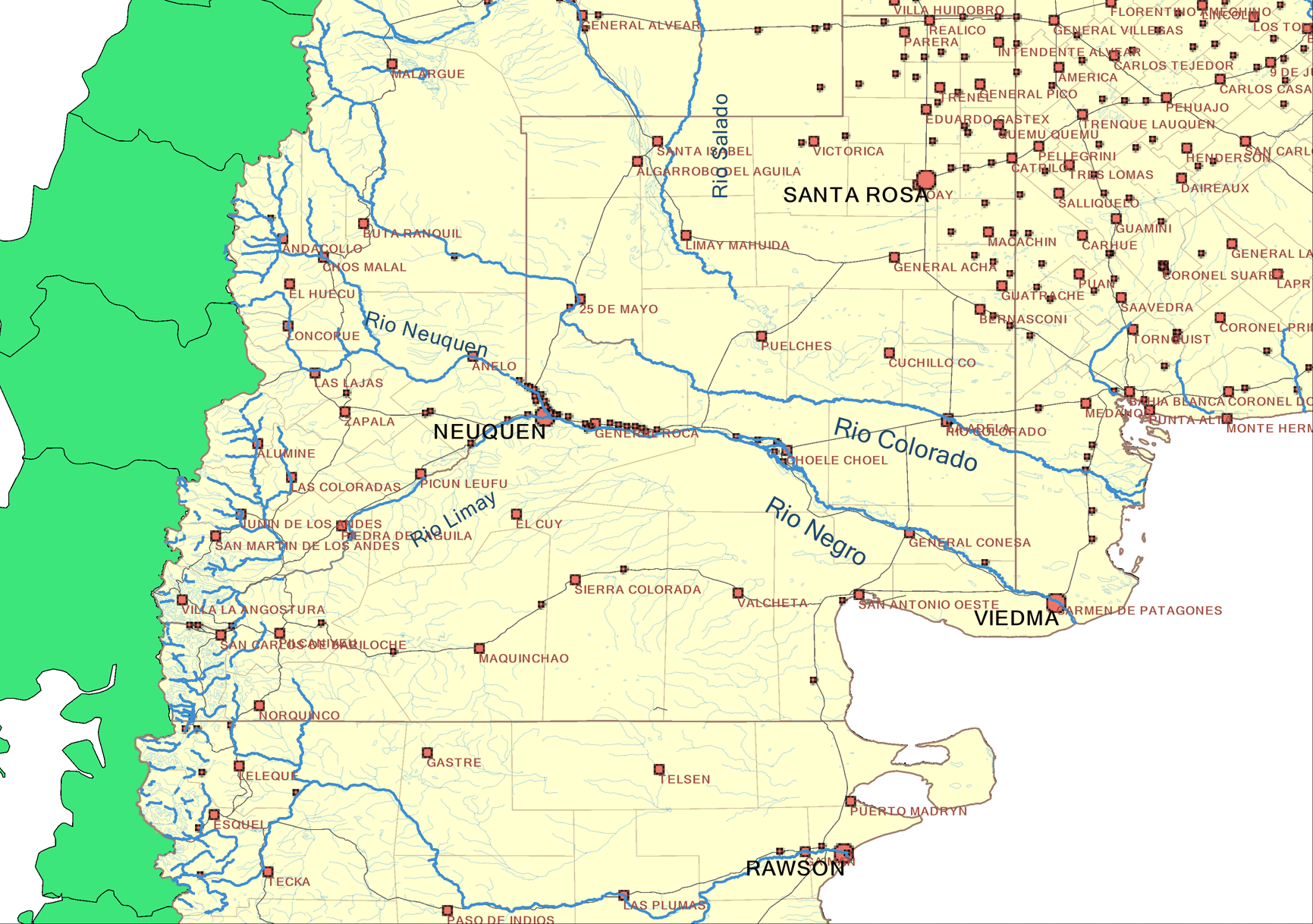
Political division of the northern Patagonia; capital cities and heads of departments labeled, national roads and main rivers.

The province is divided into 13 departments (Spanish: departamentos), listed below with their areas and populations at the Censuses of 15 May 1991, 17 November 2000, 27 October 2010 and 16 May 2022:

Name	Capital	Area (km^{2})	Census 1991	Census 2000	Census 2010	Census 2022
Adolfo Alsina	Viedma	8,813	44,465	50,701	57,678	64,482
Avellaneda	Choele Choel	20,379	27,324	32,308	35,323	41,352
Bariloche	San Carlos de Bariloche	5,415	94,640	109,826	133,500	162,088
Conesa	General Conesa	9,765	6,187	6,291	7,069	7,429
El Cuy	El Cuy	22,475	3,486	4,252	5,280	6,960
General Roca	General Roca	14,655	264,582	281,653	320,921	380,525
Ñorquincó	Ñorquincó	8,413	2,356	2,079	1,736	1,452
Nueve de Julio	Sierra Colorada	25,597	3,474	3,501	3,475	3,719
Pichi Mahuida	Río Colorado	15,378	13,351	14,026	14,017	16,551
Pilcaniyeu	Pilcaniyeu	10,545	4,963	6,114	7,428	9,373
San Antonio	San Antonio Oeste	14,015	24,216	23,972	29,284	35,800
Valcheta	Valcheta	20,457	5,091	4,946	7,101	4,319
Veinticinco de Mayo	Maquinchao	27,106	12,637	13,153	15,743	16,718
Río Negro Totals	Viedma	203,013	506,772	552,822	638,645	750,768

Source for department names:

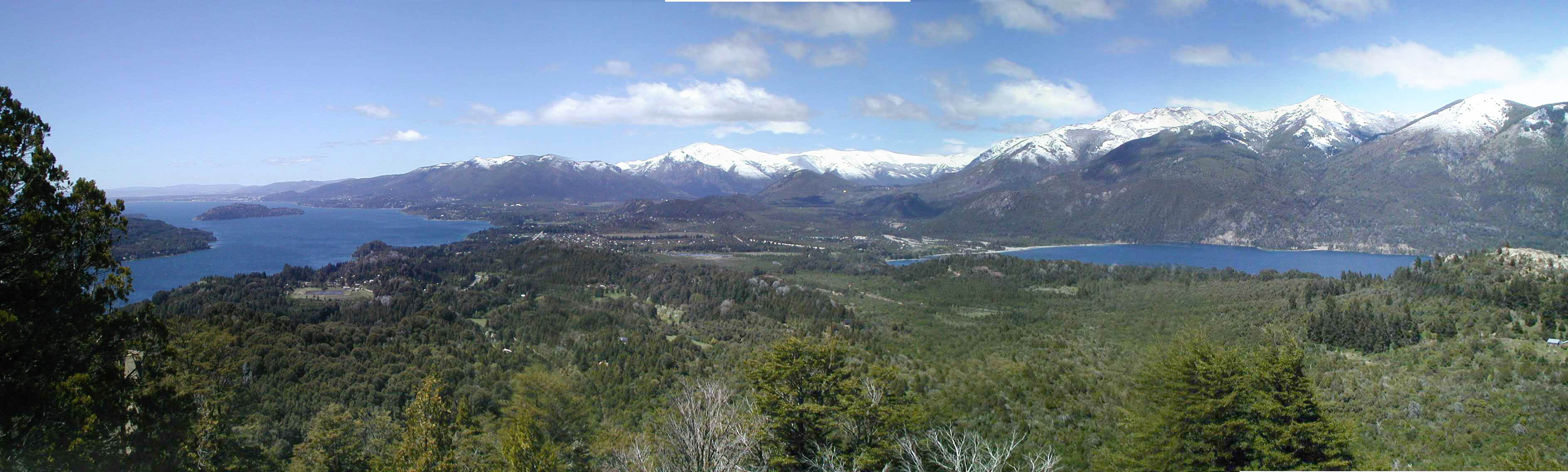
View of Lake Nahuel Huapi and the city of Bariloche.

== Economy ==
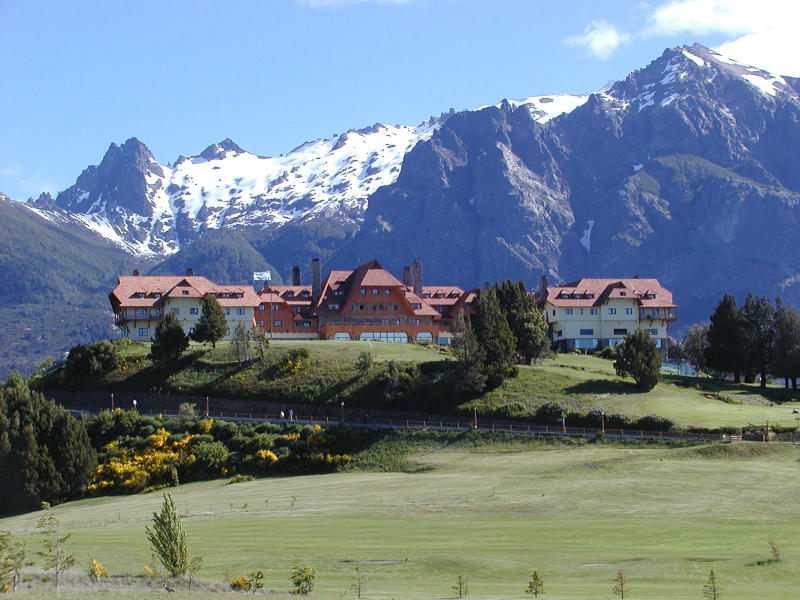
Llao Llao Hotel, on Lake Nahuel Huapi. Tourism adds at least 10% to Rio Negro's economy.

Argentina's ninth-largest, Rio Negro's economy is a diversified service-based one with vigorous agricultural and light manufacturing sectors. Its 2006 output was an estimated US$5.420 billion, or a per capita income of US$9,805. In 2013, its output increased to $43.349 billion Pesos (about US$7.939 billion) at current market prices.

There is a gold mine located at Calcatreu, near Ingeniero Jacobacci, owned by Pan American Silver. in December 2011 the provincial government repealed a law banning the use of cyanide in mineral processing, and the mine's owners regarded this as a positive development which is likely to bring increased investment.

== Tourism ==
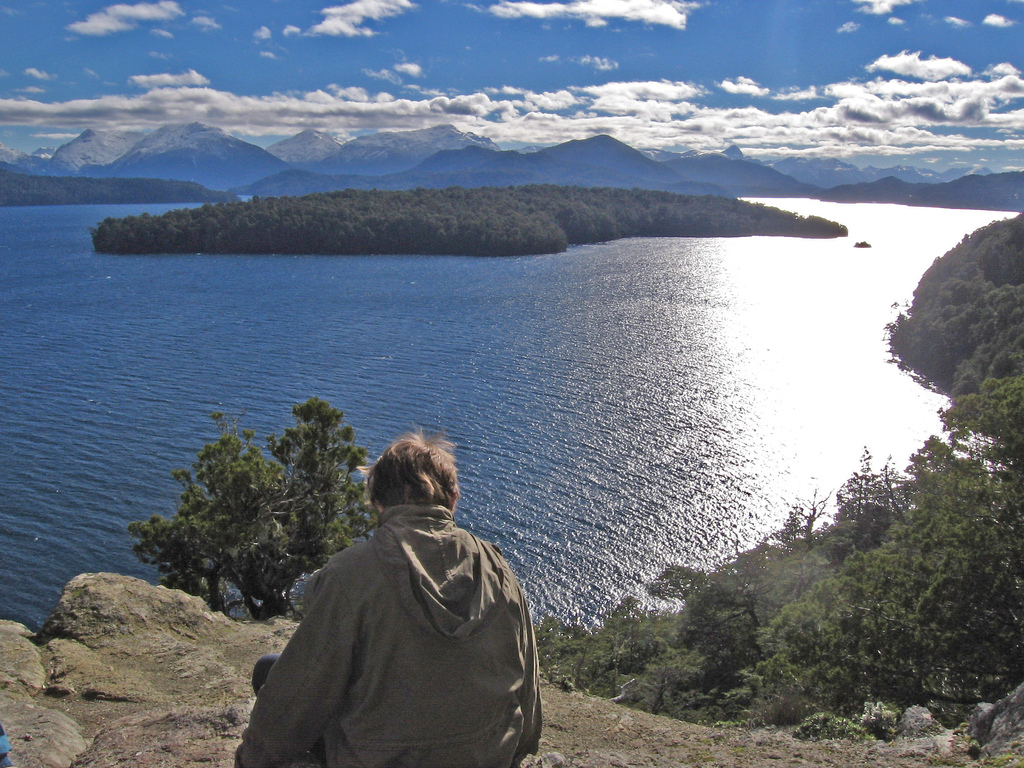
Lake Nahuel Huapi, the most famous among the Andes range's many lakes.

There are two main areas of tourism in the province; the Andes and the Atlantic coast.

The Andean Area

The most visited area is that of the lake district near San Carlos de Bariloche inside the Nahuel Huapi National Park, and neighbouring Neuquén Province. This includes the Isla Victoria, Camino de los Siete Lagos, Los Arrayanes National Park, and many trekking paths among lakes.

The Atlantic Coast

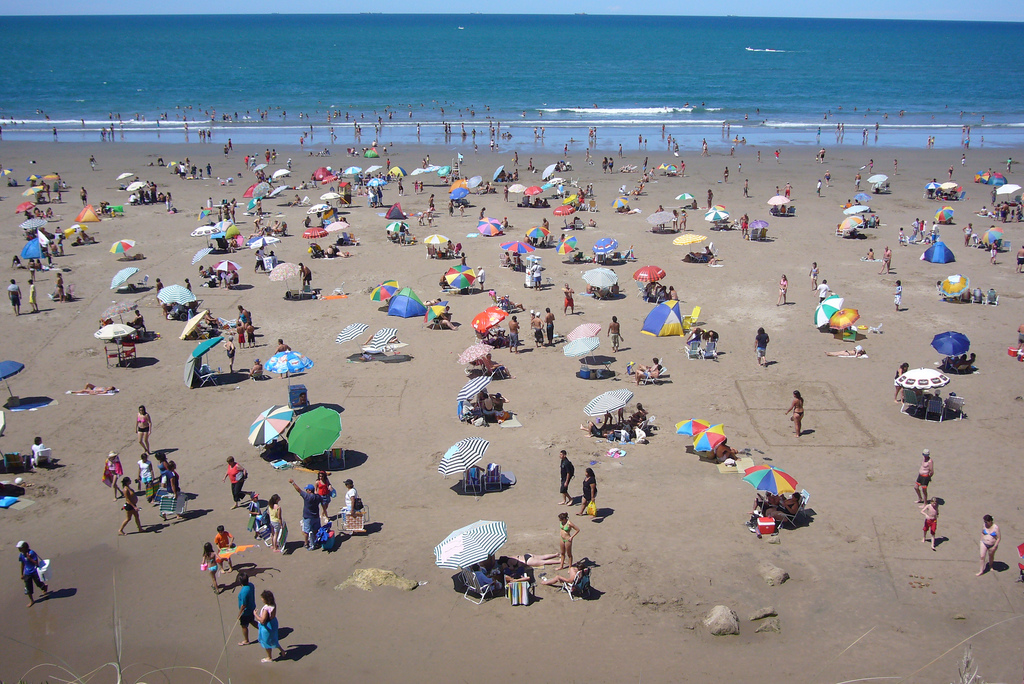
Las Grutas beach

Returns of southern right whales are one of the tourism attractions. They swim and rest very close to shore, and the San Matías Gulf is the only place in the world where swimming with this kind is commercially permitted.

== Villages ==
- Arroyo de La Ventana
- Barrio Chacra Monte
- Barrio Puente 83
- Chipauquil
- Clemente Onelli
- Colan Conhue
- Colonia Juliá y Echarren
- Cubanea
- El Caín
- El Foyel
- El Manso
- La Lobería
- Las Bayas
- Mamuel Choique
- Mencué
- Mina Santa Teresita
- Nahuel Niyeu
- Naupa Huen
- Paso Córdoba
- Pilquiniyeu
- Pilquiniyeu del Limay
- Playas Doradas
- Pozo Salado
- Punta Colorada
- Sierra Pailemán
