= Neuquén (disambiguation) =

Neuquén is a city in Argentina.

Neuquén may also refer to:

== Geography ==
- Neuquén Province, a province of Argentina
- Neuquén River, a river in the Neuquén Province
- Neuquén Governate, a former territorial division of Argentina between 1884 and 1955

== Geology ==
- Neuquén Basin, a hydrocarbon-rich sedimentary basin in northern Patagonia
- Neuquén Group, a Late Cretaceous geologic group in the Neuquén Basin
- Río Neuquén Subgroup, a subgroup of the geologic group, named after the river

== Paleontology ==
- Neuquenraptor, a theropod dinosaur from the Neuquén Basin
- Neuquensaurus, a sauropod dinosaur from the Neuquén Basin
- Neuquensuchus, a crocodyliform from the Neuquén Basin

== Society ==
- Neuquén – Plottier – Cipolletti, agglomeration of the cities of Neuquén, Plottier and Cipolletti
- Neuquén-Cipolletti bridges, a series of bridges over the Neuquén River
- Neuquén People's Movement, a provincial political party in Neuquén Province
