= Neuquén railway station =

Railway station in Neuquén, Argentina

Neuquén
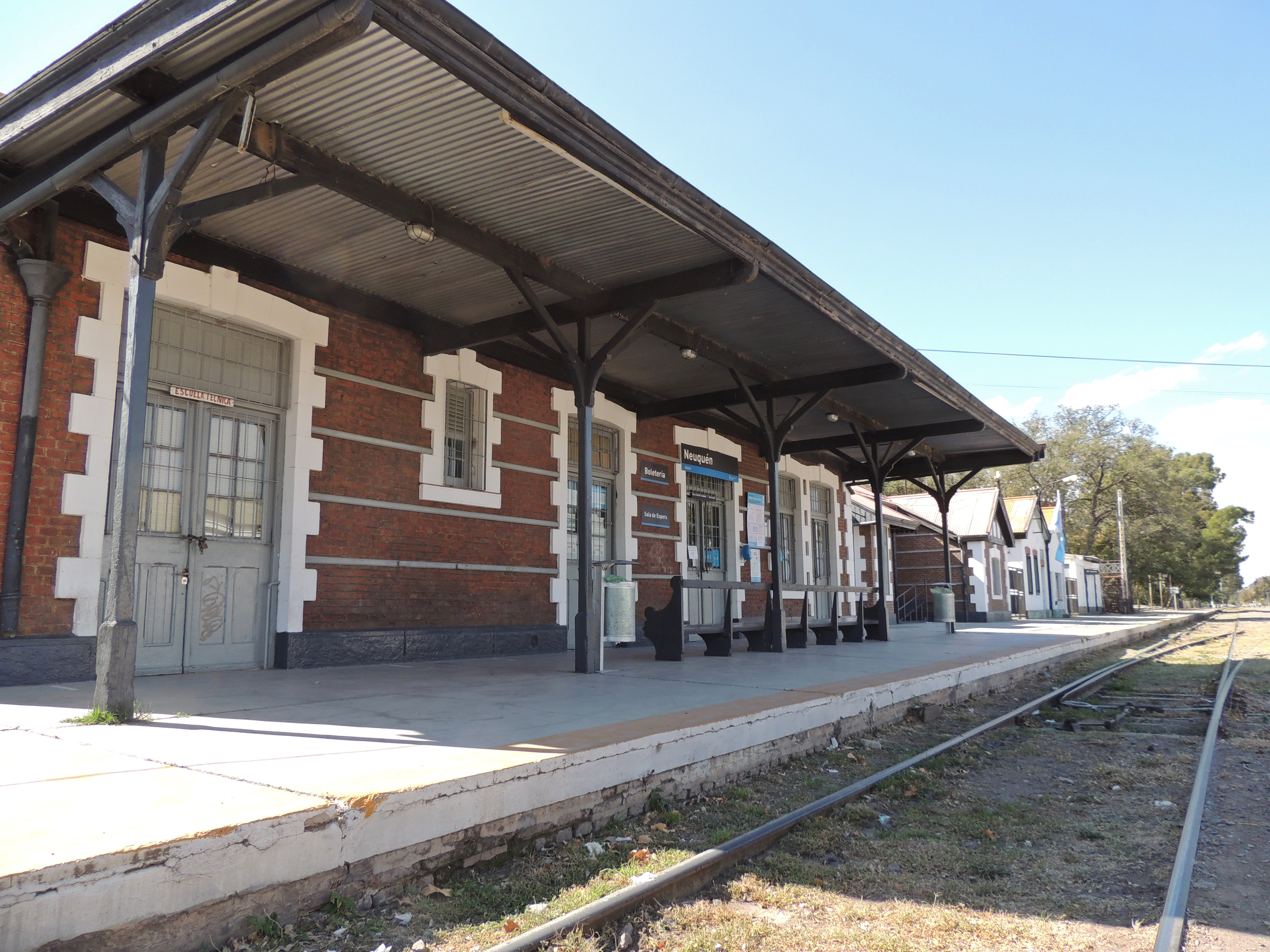
- Station building and platform in April 2021

General information
- Location: Área Centro Este, Neuquén; Argentina
- Coordinates: 38.955861°S 68.058278°W
- Managed by: Trenes Argentinos (passenger); Ferrosur Roca (freight)
- Platforms: 1

Key dates
- 1901; 124 years ago: Opened
- 1993: Passenger services cancelled after privatisation
- 2015: Passenger services restored
Location

Neuquén is a train station in the homonymous city in Argentina, which is served by the Ferrosur Roca's Zapala-Bahía Blanca freight service and the Tren del Valle commuter service. Situated on the Central Park in the city center, adjoining other historical railway constructions such as the Emilio Saraco Art Gallery, it was declared a building of historical relevance by the National Government. Opened in 1902, the station played a significant role in the region's development and the decision to declare it the capital of the National Territory, which was to become the current Province in 1955.

== History ==
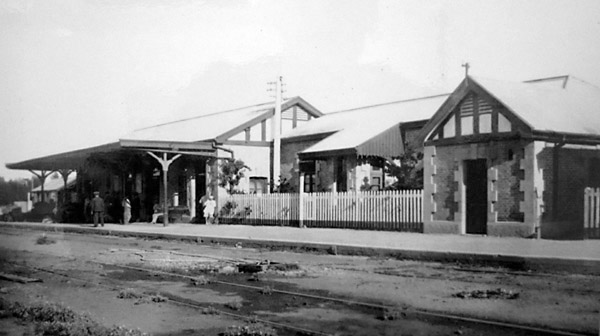
The station in 1913

Amid the expansion of the Buenos Aires Great Southern Railway to connect the Neuquén National Territory with Buenos Aires in view of a potential armed conflict with Chile, the railway bridge over the Neuquén River was finished in 1902 and the station was opened the same year. The train connection with the national capital was one of the key factors when governor Bouquet Roldán decided to move the National Territory capital from Chos Malal in the north to the then-newly founded town on the confluence of the Neuquén and Limay rivers, which had existed since the last decades of the 19th century under the name Paraje Confluencia. The city started growing around the train station, situated in the area which is the current Central Park.

Neuquén became an intermediate station on the line running from Constitución station to Zapala via Bahía Blanca for both freight and passenger services, the latter being discontinued in 1991 during the nationwide railway privatisation. From 1916 to 1931 there was the intercity passenger line between Neuquén and Chichinales, which was resumed in 2015 only between Neuquén and Cipolletti with plans of being expanded from Plottier to the old east end station.

== Architecture ==
The station was officially declared a building of historic interest by the National Government in 2014. It was built at the beginning of the 20th century by the British-owned company Buenos Aires Great Southern Railway, which designed it in the style of a British railway building of the time. Some of its characteristics are facede with exposed brick walls, galvanized sheet roofing, spruce floors, green flagstone baseboards and different wooden structures, such as doors, windows and platform eaves. Some of the original structures and other elements have been kept since its construction in 1901, such as the clock, ticket offices and waiting rooms.

== Services ==
Since its inauguration the station has been served by the Zapala-Bahía Blanca freight line, operated by the company Ferrosur Roca as of 2020. The commuting train Tren del Valle, connecting the city with the neighbouring Cipolletti in the Río Negro Province has been re-established in 2015. The line was expanded to its west end in Plottier in 2021. A further expansion from Plottier to as far as Chichinales to the east across the Upper Valley of the Río Negro river has been discussed.

Different plans have been considered to build a freight line connecting the petroleum reservoir Vaca Muerta near Añelo and the agricultural region of the Upper Río Negro Valley with the Bahía Blanca harbor, being Neuquén one of the stops.

=== Operators ===
Company	Period
(United Kingdom) BA Great Southern	1901–1948
(Argentina) Ferrocarriles Argentinos	1948–1993
(Argentina) Ferrosur Roca (Note: Only freight services.)	1993–present
(Argentina) Trenes Argentinos	2015–present

== Gallery ==
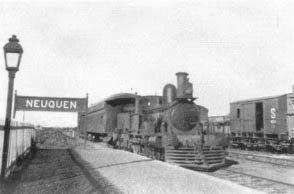
The station in 1900s

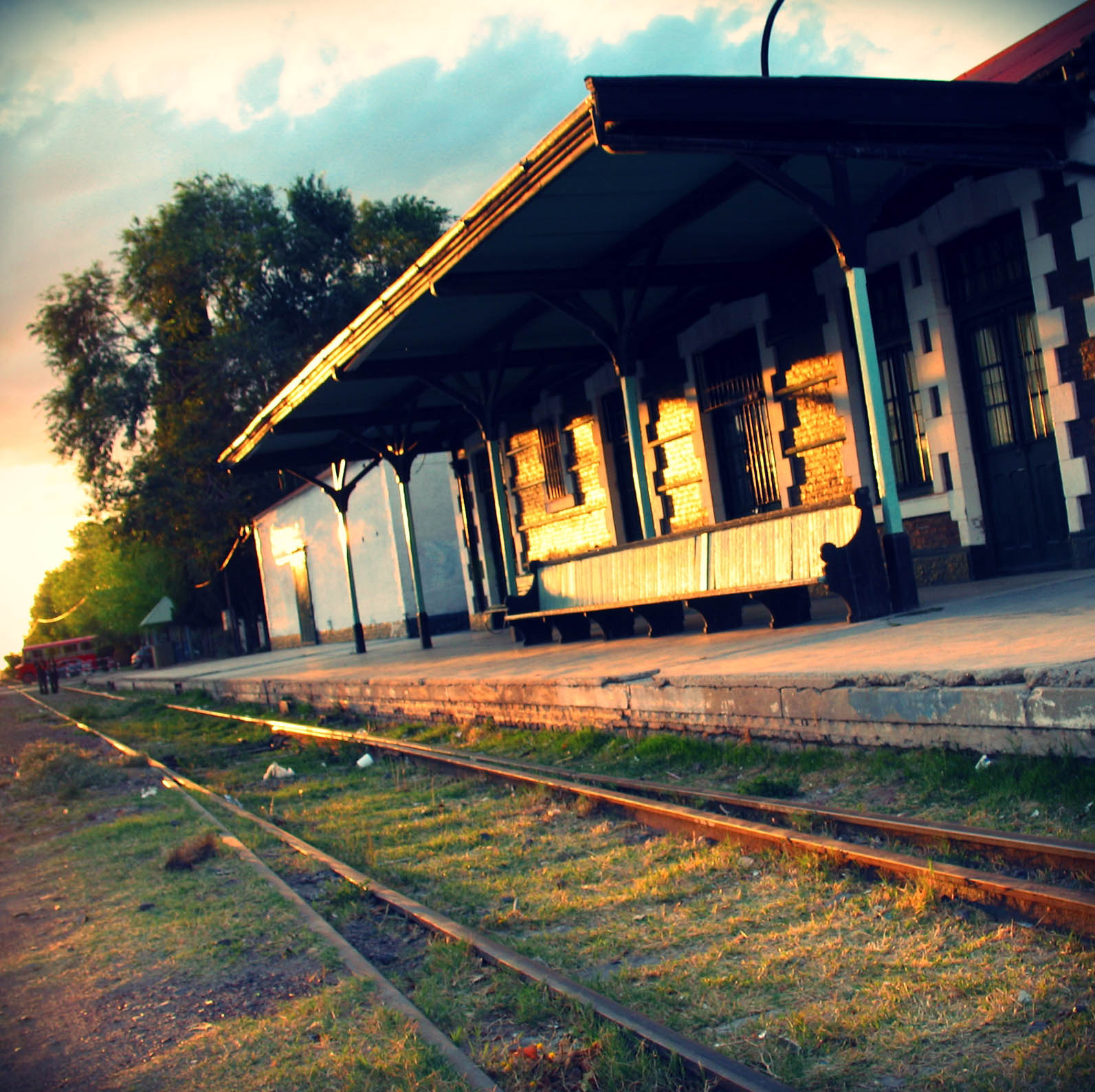
The station in 2010

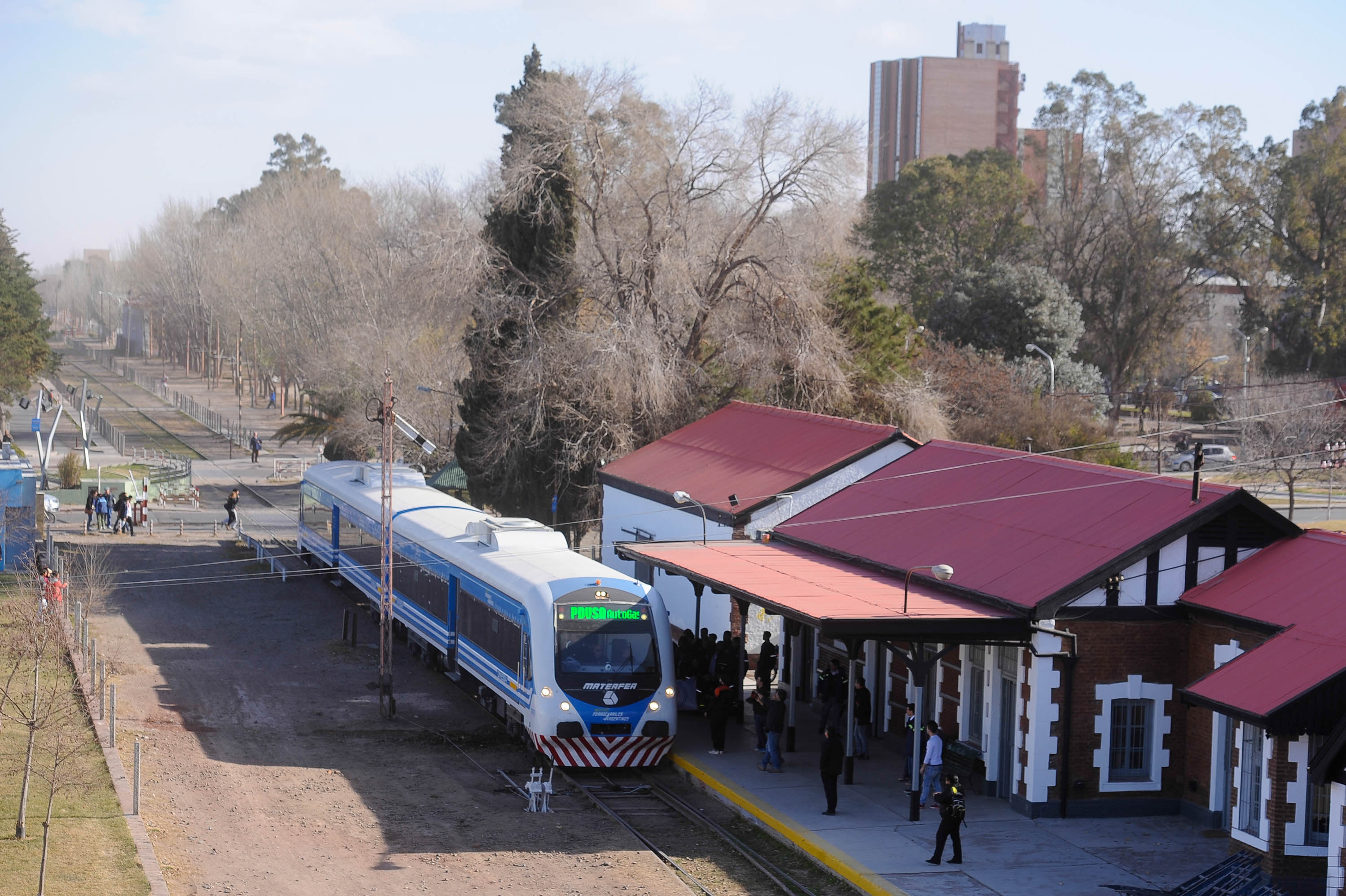
Train stopped, 2015

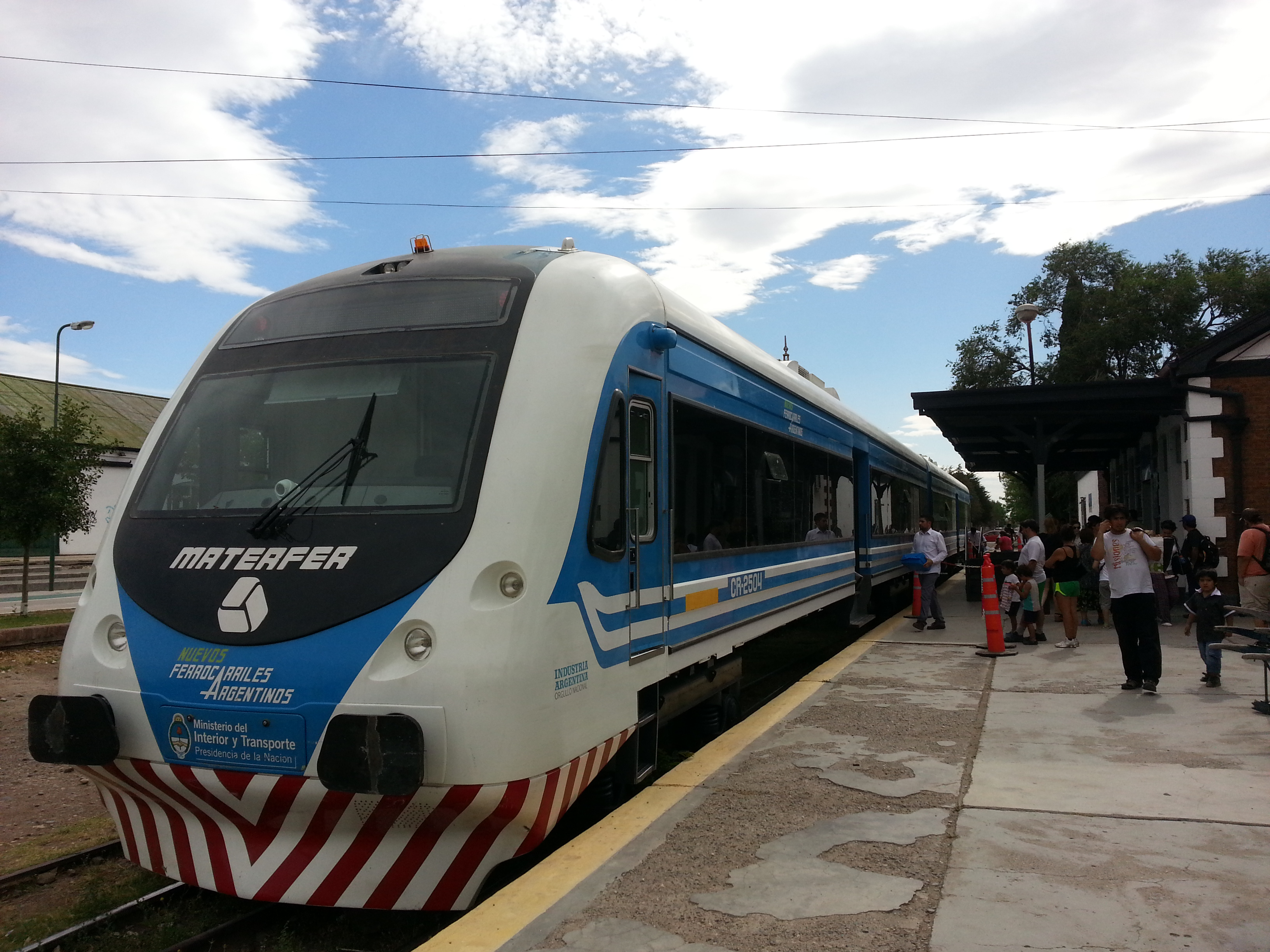
Train in 2016

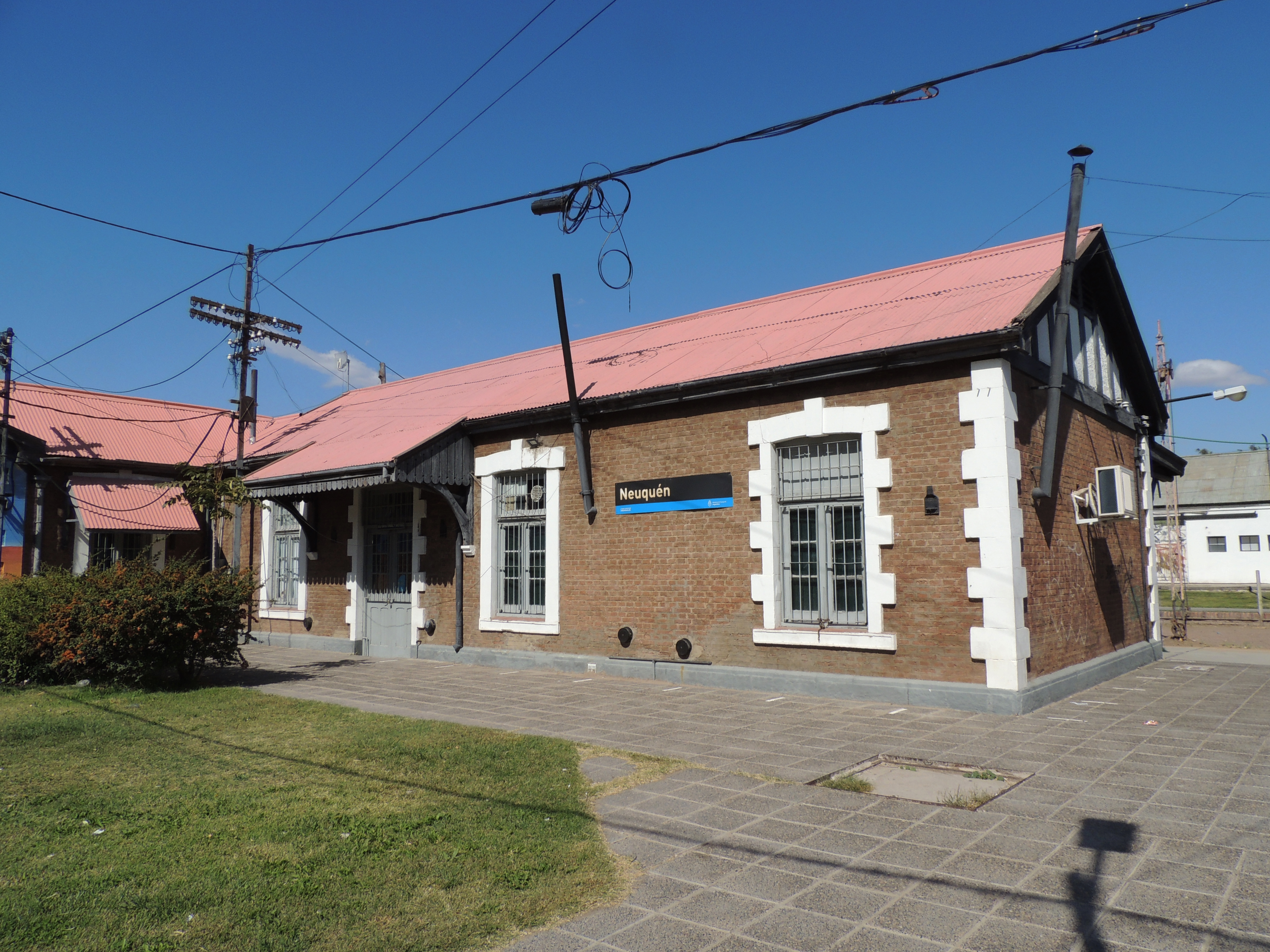
Back view of the building, 2021

== See also ==
- Tren del Valle
