= Fotheringham Crossing Pyramid =

Monument on the Neuquén River

- Monolito Recordatorio Paso Fotheringham
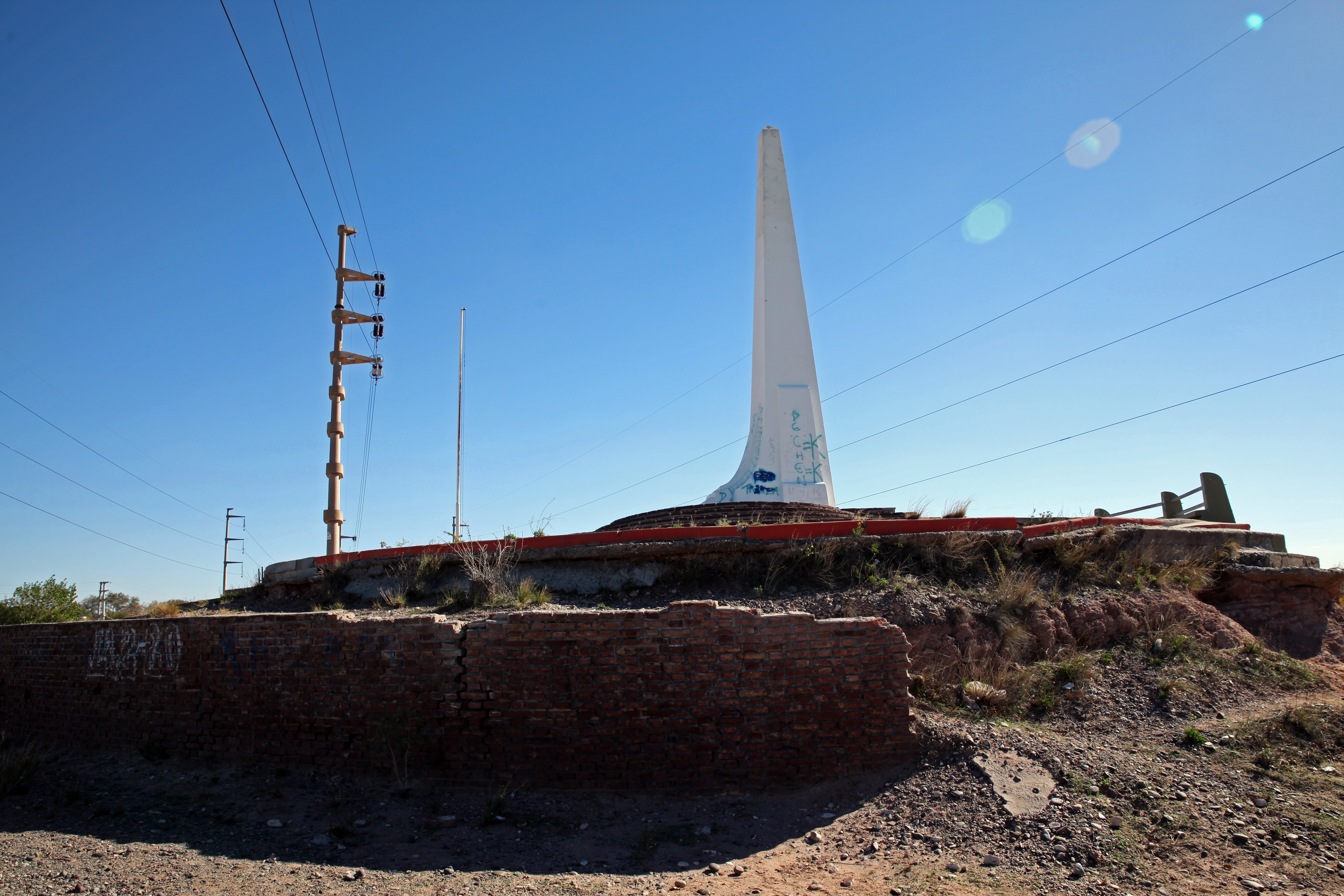
- Interactive map of Fotheringham Crossing Pyramid
- Location: Sapere, Neuquén, Argentina
- Coordinates: 38°56′59.7″S 68°01′24.2″W
- Material: Brick and cement
- Opening date: February 3, 1947
- Dedicated to: Crossing of the Neuquén River during the Conquest of the Desert

The Fotheringham Crossing Pyramid (Spanish: Monolito Paso Fotheringham) is a monument located on a hill on the bank of the Neuquén River, in the neighborhood of Sapere in Neuquén, Argentina, built to commemorate the crossing of the river by Colonel Ignacio Fotheringham, Major Fábregras, and an unknown soldier in 1879, during the Conquest of the Desert.

== Background ==
At midday on June 11, 1879, an Argentine Army retinue led by Julio Roca, then Minister of War and the Navy, reached the confluence of the Neuquén and Limay Rivers during the Conquest of the Desert, a military campaign directed against the native population of Argentina.

Roca ordered the natives serving among his men to cross the river, but they were unable to do it and almost drowned. He then offered a reward of 2,000 pesos to whoever could cross. English-born Ignacio Hamilton Fotheringham, the commander of the 7th Infantry Regiment, took up the challenge, joined by Sergeant Fábregas and an unknown soldier.

The strong current knocked the three men out of their horses. Although Fotheringham was dragged 400 metres (1,300 ft) downstream by the cold water, he and his men were able to reach the other bank of the river, on the eastern edge of present-day Neuquén.

== Monument ==
The place of the crossing was declared a historic site on December 28, 1943. The pyramid, an obelisk about 10 metres (33 ft) in height and made of brick and cement, was inaugurated on a hill overlooking the bridges spanning the river between Neuquén and the neighboring city of Cipolletti on February 3, 1947. A sidewalk and cement benches were built around the monument. The original bronze plaques were stolen, and the pyramid has been repeatedly vandalized with graffiti.

Along with the Neuquén River bridge, the monument was depicted in the first test card of LU84 Canal 7, a local television channel, in 1965. Despite remaining little-known among the general public in Neuquén, the monument is considered to be a symbol of the neighborhood of Sapere by its inhabitants.
