= Gregorio Álvarez Provincial Museum =

Museo Provincial Dr Gregorio Álvarez
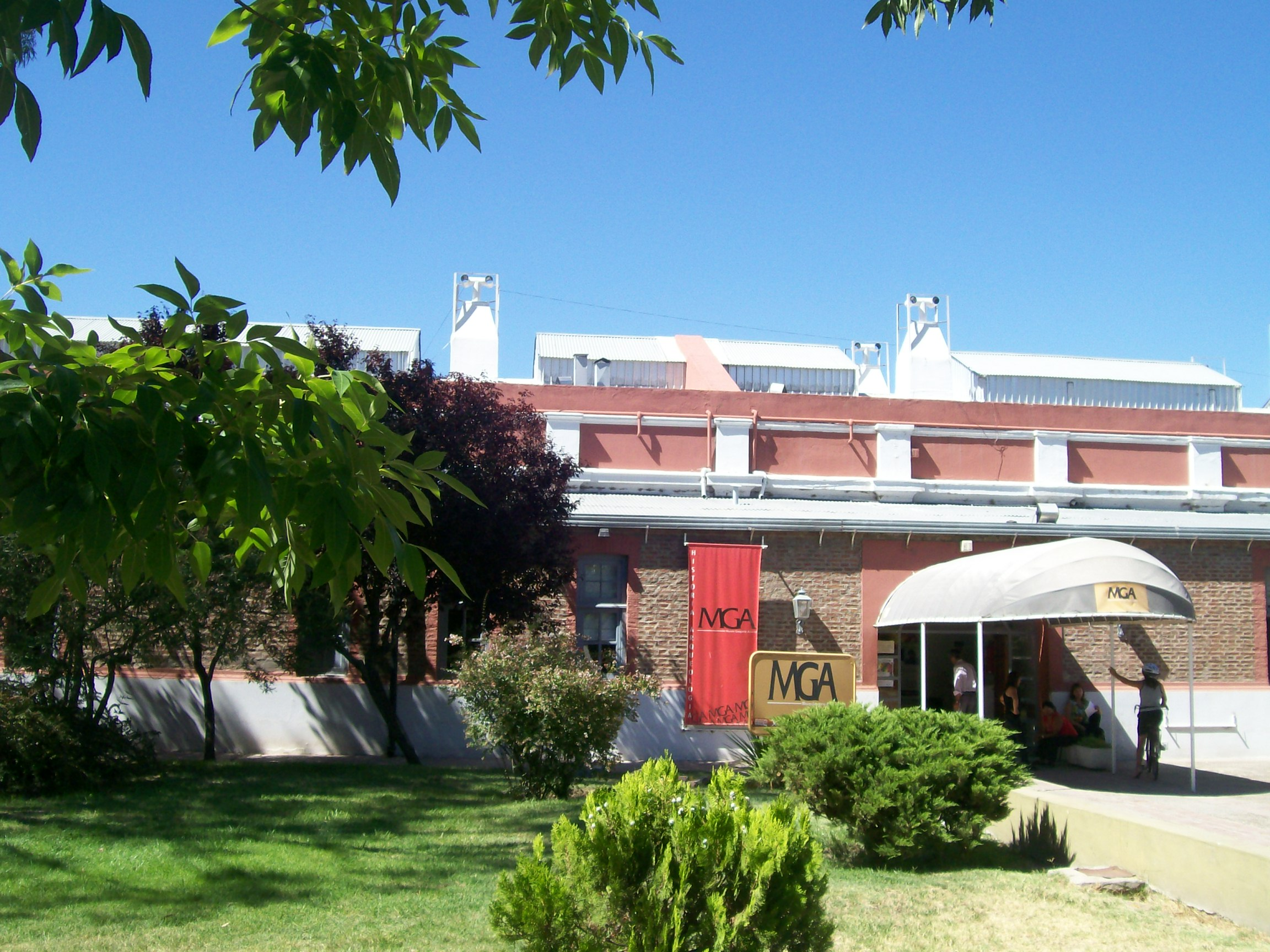
- Established: 20 December 1986
- Location: Neuquén, Argentina
- Coordinates: 38°57′20.037″S 68°3′44.775″W
- Type: Archeological and Cultural Historical museum

The Gregorio Álvarez Provincial Museum (Spanish: Museo Provincial Gregorio Álvarez), is located in Neuquén, Argentina. Opened in 1986 and housed in an original 1901 railway building from the early days of the city, it is dedicated to the historic and cultural heritage of the Neuquén province. It offers a permanent archeologic exhibition of objects belonging to the local native tribes and different rotating ones related to the region's heritage.

== History ==
The building of the current museum was built in 1901 by the Buenos Aires Great Southern Railway as a machine shed and a workshop within the lands belonging to the company, which would later become the city's Central Park in 1986. The year before, a local commission seeking to revalorize historical buildings and monuments proposed restoration of the building, preventing it from being demolished in order to construct a modern building complex. Remodeling started soon thereafter under the direction of architect Elena Coronel and the former railway workshop was adapted into a museum. The newly inaugurated museum was named after local historian, writer and university professor Gregorio Álvarez, considered a prominent inhabitant of the city. In 1993, the museum's administration was transferred from province to municipal authorities.

The facilities temporarily held the exhibitions of the Argentine Fine Arts Museum from 2000 until 2004, when the branch of the former was inaugurated, also in the Central Park. In 2005, the museum underwent a new remodeling, during which the early 20th century roof and the later-added stained glass were restored, the walls were painted and the exhibition vitrines were improved with new carpentry and information signs.

== The Museum ==
The museum is dedicated to the history of the Neuquén province. It features a permanent archeological exposition of 5,840 pieces belonging to the native tribes dating back over 7,000 years, most of them found near Las Lajas. The museum also features different rotating expositions related to the Neuquén province's cultural heritage.

== Architecture ==
The building was declared of historical interest by the province authorities upon the museum's opening in 1986. It depicts the style of a British railway building of the early 20th century, having been constructed by the British-owned Buenos Aires Great Southern Railway. Although remodeling was performed over the years, the original structure remained similar to its original state. Six windows decorated with different painted details were added on top of the former locomotive entrances on the east and west ends of the building in 1986, prior to its inauguration as a museum.

Along with buildings, such as the Neuquén railway station, the Emilio Saraco Art Gallery and the Paraje Confluencia Museum, also located in the Central Park, the former machine shed is a reminiscent of the railway expansion into the region in 1901.
