= Tren del Valle =

Passenger train in Argentina

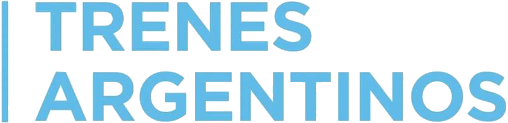

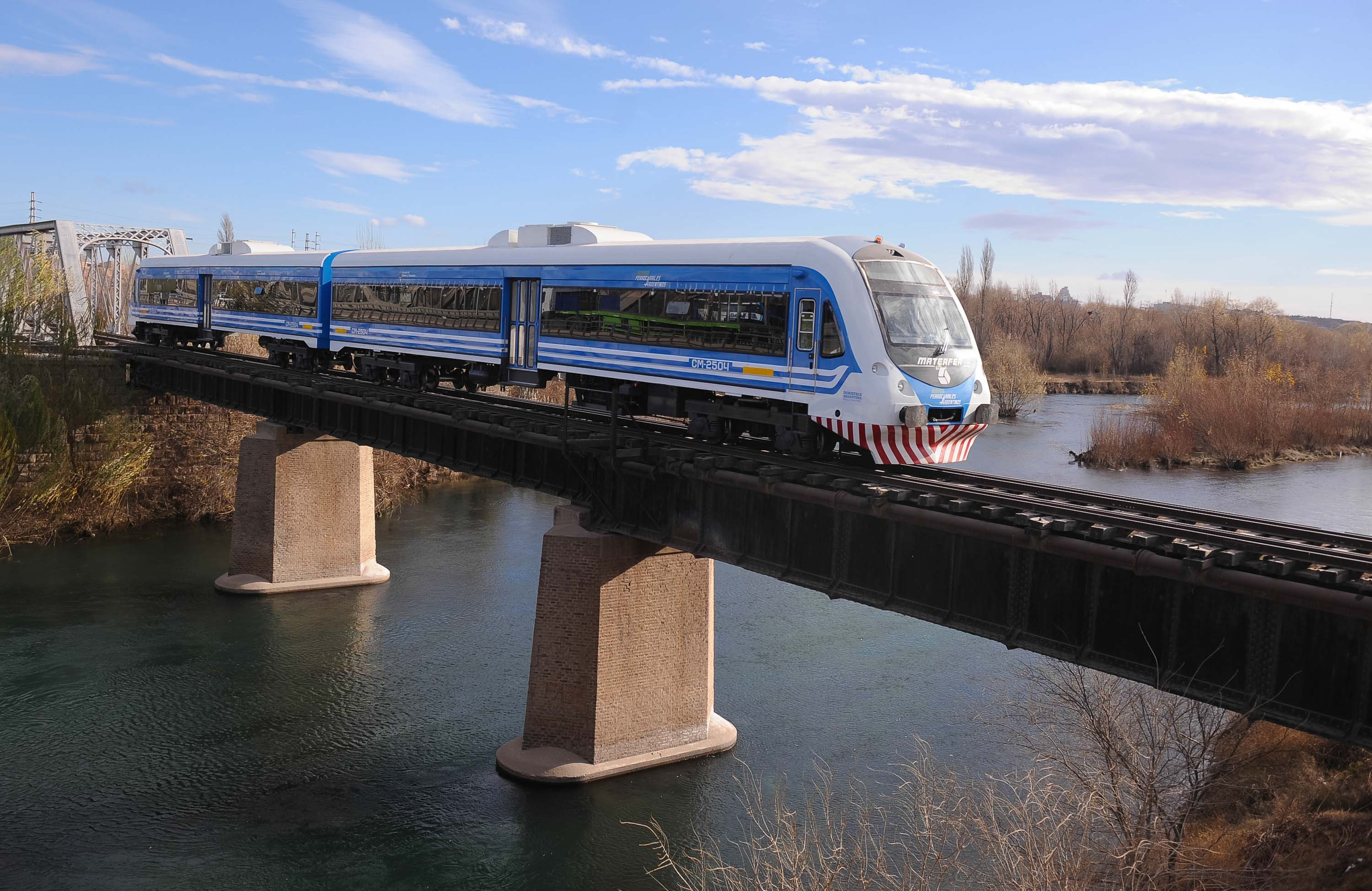
- Train crossing a bridge in July 2015

Overview
- Service type: Commuter rail
- Status: Active
- Locale: Río Negro; Neuquén
- First service: 21 July 2015; 11 years ago
- Current operator: Trenes Argentinos
- Former operators: BA Great Southern (1901-48); Ferrocarriles Argentinos (1948-93)
- Ridership: 1,500 per day (
- Annual ridership: 24,000 per month
- Website: trenesargentinos/regneuquen

Route
- Termini: Plottier; Cipolletti
- Distance travelled: 21 km (13 mi)
- Average journey time: 70 minutes
- Service frequency: 13 trains per day
- Line used: Roca

Technical
- Rolling stock: Materfer CMM 400-2
- Track gauge: 1,676 mm (5 ft 6 in)

Tren del Valle is a 10-kilometre (6.2 mi) commuter rail service that connects cities of Plottier, Neuquén and Cipolletti, in the Río Negro and Neuquén Provinces of Argentina, running on Roca Railway tracks.

Tren del Valle is named after "Alto valle del Río Negro", a valley located at the north west of Río Negro Province, crossing cities of General Roca, Cipolletti, Villa Regina, Cinco Saltos, among others. It extends from the confluence of Limay and Neuquén rivers to Chichinales. The region is about 52,000 m^{2} (560,000 sq ft) in size, and is also notable for its production of apples as well as its vast Vaca Muerta oil field, whose freight lines will share some tracks with the Tren del Valle.

The service, after preliminary tests, was opened on 21 July 2015, being operated by state-owned Trenes Argentinos.

In 2022 two new stops opened at the Neuquén Bus Terminal and the Neuquén Presidente Perón Airport.

== History ==
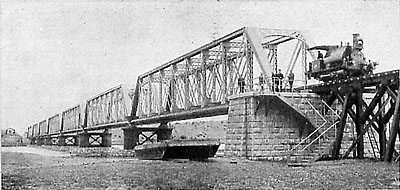
Bridge over the Neuquén River, 1902

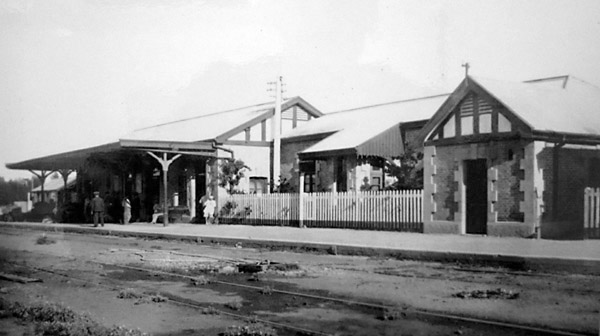
The Neuquén station in 1913

The railway was originally built and operated by British-owned Buenos Aires Great Southern Railway, that reached the city of Zapala in 1908, expanding its network to 6,082 km (3,779 mi) by then. After the railways were nationalised in 1948, the BAGSR became part of General Roca Railway, one of the six divisions of recently created state-owned Ferrocarriles Argentinos.

In 2014, several railway projects were approved for the Río Negro and Neuquén provinces to reactivate passenger services in the region, they were Estrella del Valle, Tren del Valle, and Tren del Dique, running on Roca Railway tracks. The first step of the project will be to open the "Tren del Valle" that will connect cities of Neuquén (of the homonymous province) and Cipolletti in Río Negro Province. Rolling stock used will be provided by local company Materfer, that was committed to build 20 CMM 400-2 railcars to run on the line. There is no time limit for the reopening.

Works for the reopening included repair of the bridge that crosses the river and the remodelling of Neuquén station, a part of the installation of six warning devices on six level crossings along the route.

During the first days of July 2015, the train made its first preliminary tests, running between both cities before being officially inaugurated on 20 of July. The first expansion was made in 2021 to the city of Plottier, around 15 km west of Neuquén.

Other projects plan to extend the service to the end of the valley, reaching cities such as Senillosa and Chichinales.

In 2026, the Government of Argentina transferred the service to the Río Negro Province that will took its operation and maintenance. The transfer will be effective on 16 November. The province will operate Tren del Valle through its state-owned company Tren Patagónico. Once the transfer is effective, services will be extended to the city of General Roca

== Gallery ==
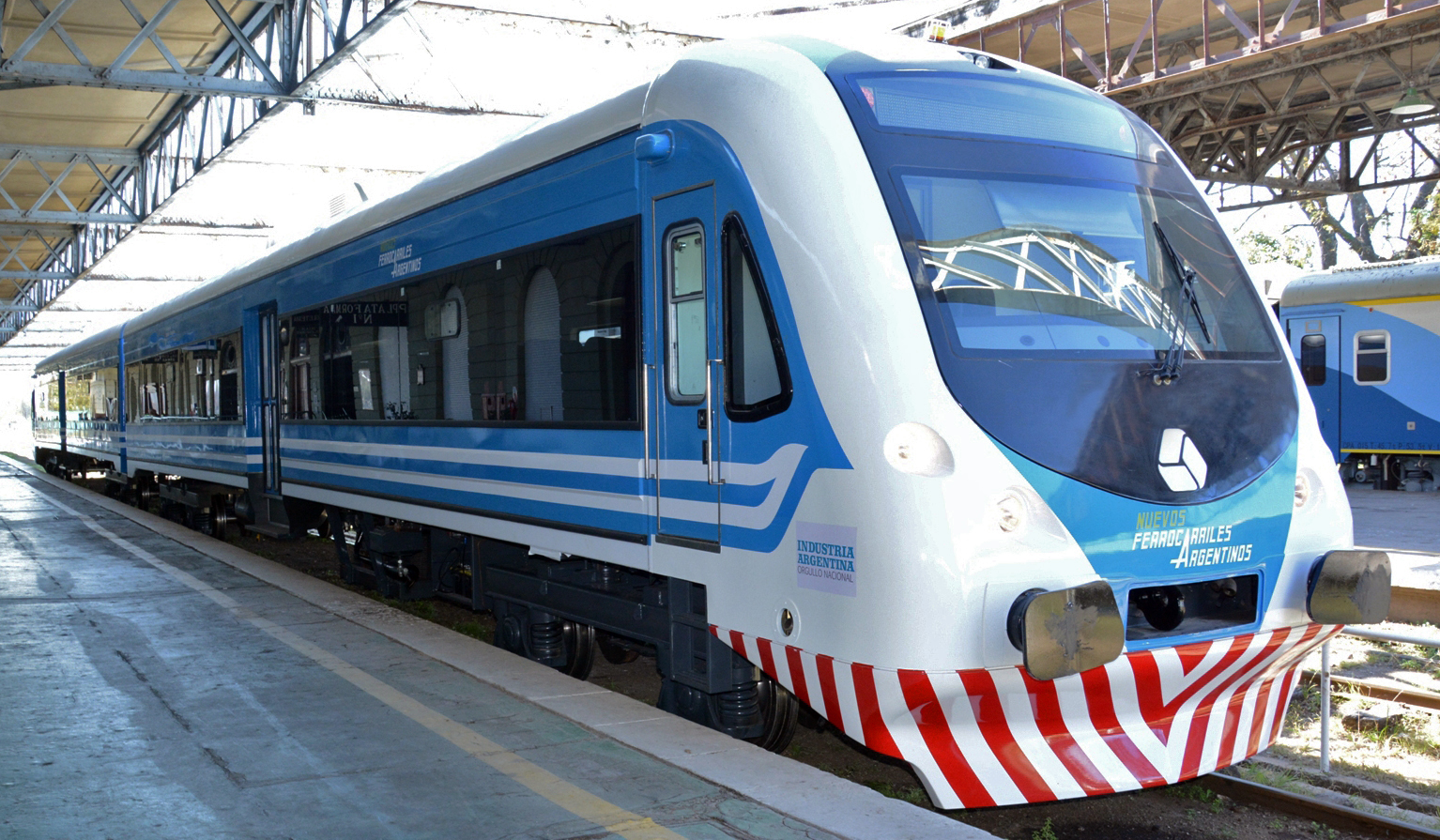
A CMM 400-2 railcar by Materfer

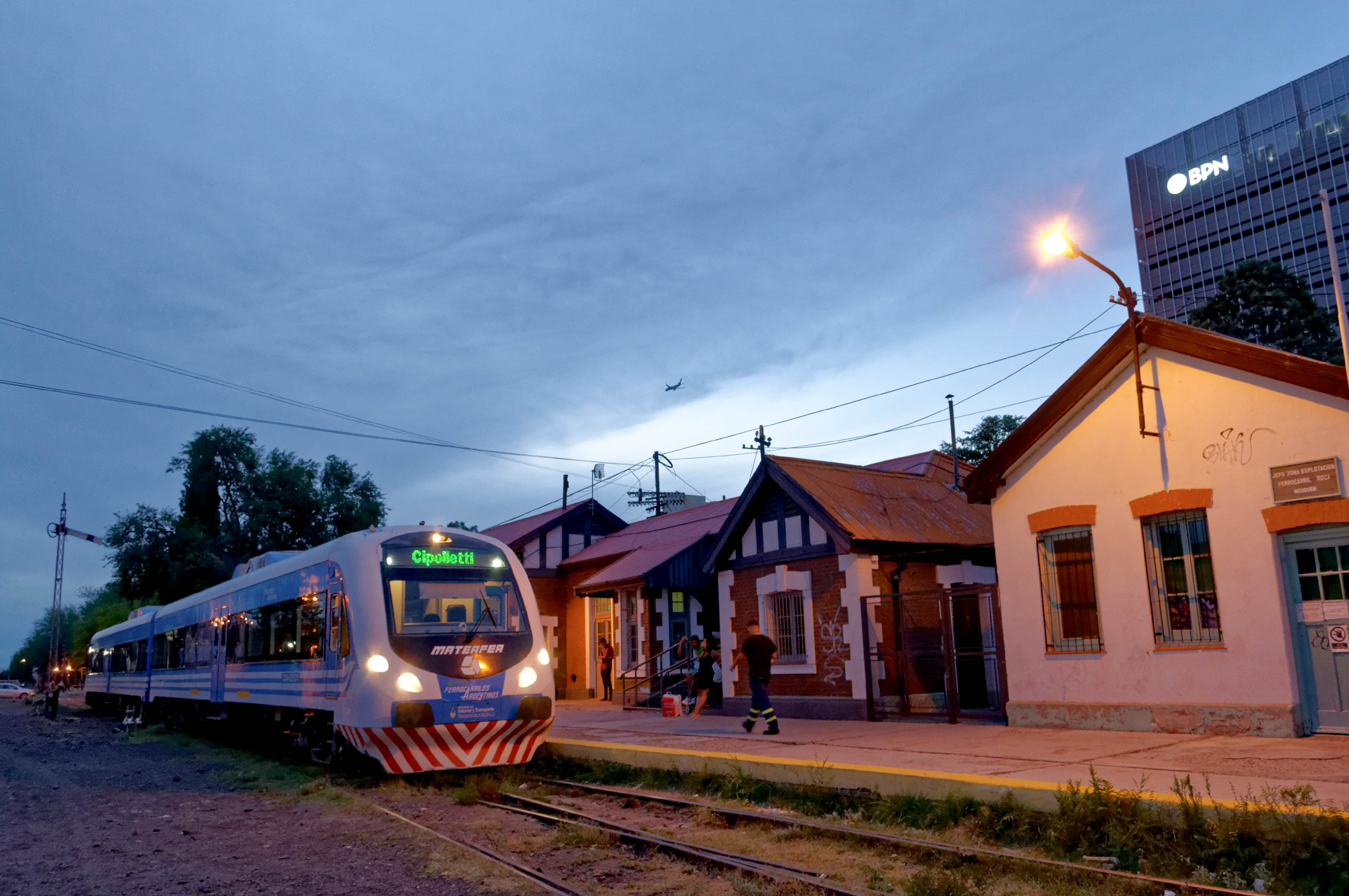
Train at Cipolleti

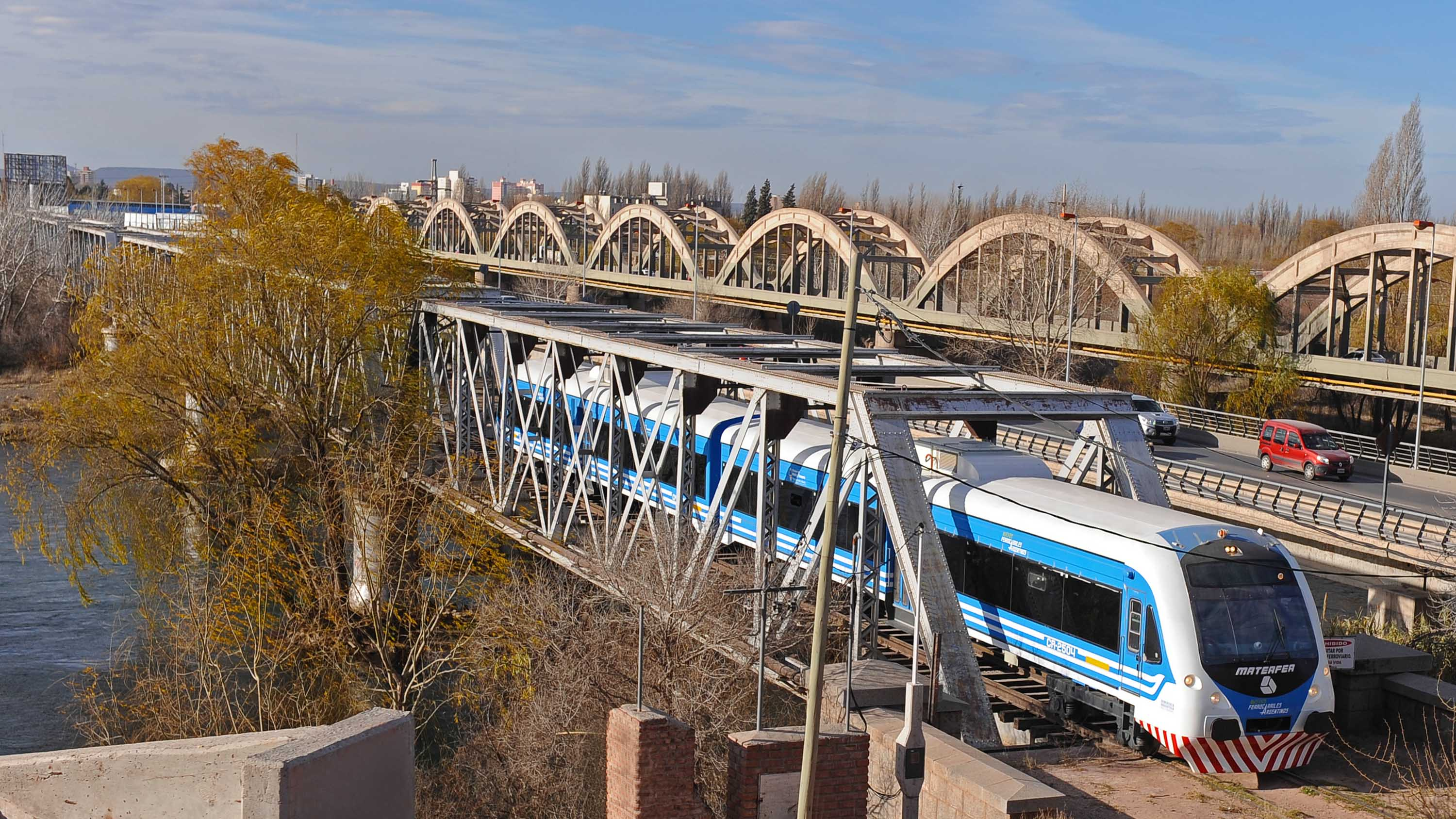
Train running on the Neuquén River bridge

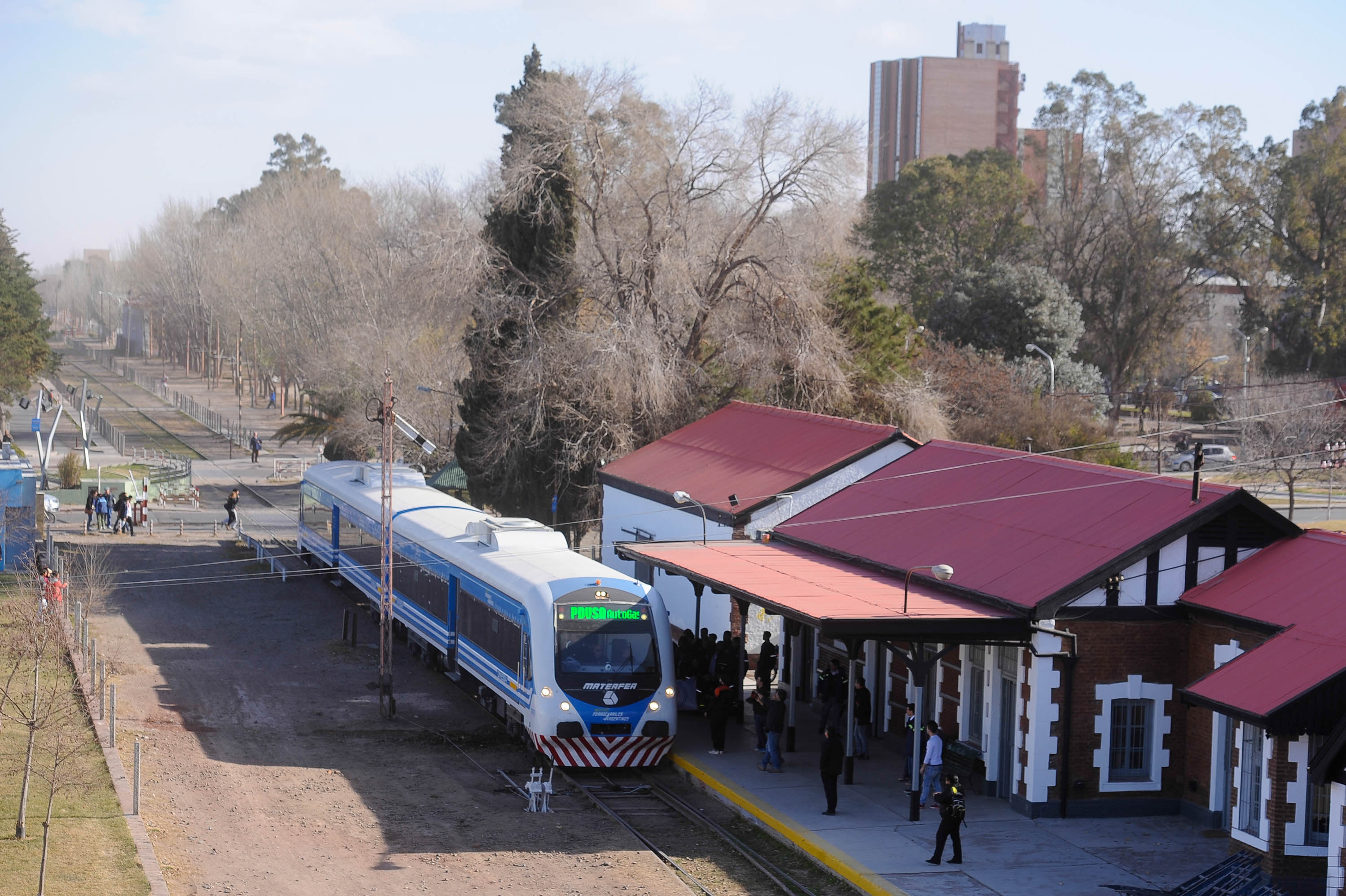
A train in Neuquén station, 2015

== See also ==
- Neuquén-Cipolletti bridges
