= Las Perlas =

Coordinates: 38°59′10″S 68°08′20″W

- Village
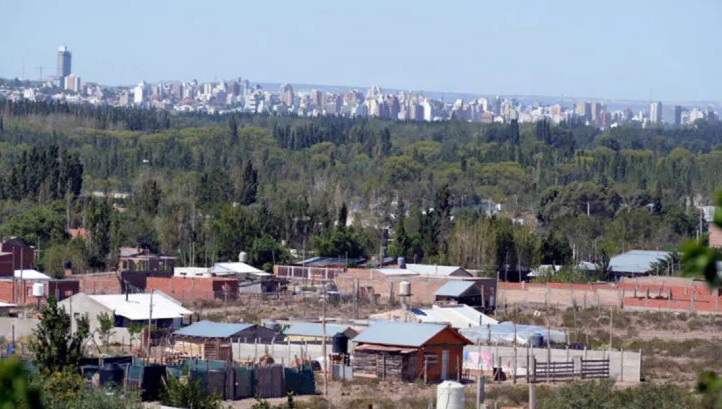
- Las Perlas and Neuquén
- Interactive map of Las Perlas
- Country: Argentina
- Province: Río Negro Province
- Department: El Cuy Department
- Municipality: Cipolletti

Population (2010)
  - Total: 2,182
- Time zone: UTC−3 (ART)

Las Perlas is a village in the north-west of Río Negro Province in Argentina, at the shore of the Río Limay.

Las Perlas is a small, but fast-growing bedroom community of the Neuquén - Plottier - Cipolletti metro area. It is part of the city and municipality of Cipolletti, but is located about 15 km west of the city center, very close to Neuquén, at the southern shore of the Limay river. While Cipolletti's main urban area is located in the General Roca Department, Las Perlas, like the whole southern part of the municipality, is part of the El Cuy Department.

== History ==
Las Perlas was established as an informal community after 1958, when a forestry company bought land in the area. After 1967, infrastructure for irrigation and roads were built. In 1987, the village was included in the municipality of Cipolletti. In 2000, a bridge to Neuquén was built, and in 2016 another bridge linked the town to Cipolletti across the Negro river.

== Transport ==
Las Perlas is connected with Neuquén across a bridge. There is also a dirt road, Ruta Provincial 7, linking Las Perlas directly to Cipolletti across a bridge near Isla Jordan, an island in the Río Negro east of the confluence between the Limay and the Neuquén.

Local bus line 102 links Las Perlas to Neuquén's city center.

Before the bridges to Neuquén and Cipolletti were built, the town was accessible by cable ferry (balsa, in Spanish) from both Neuquén and Cipolletti. In consequence, the town was often called Balsa Las Perlas.
