= Confluencia Department =

Coordinates: 38°57′05″S 68°03′33″W

Confluencia
- Department
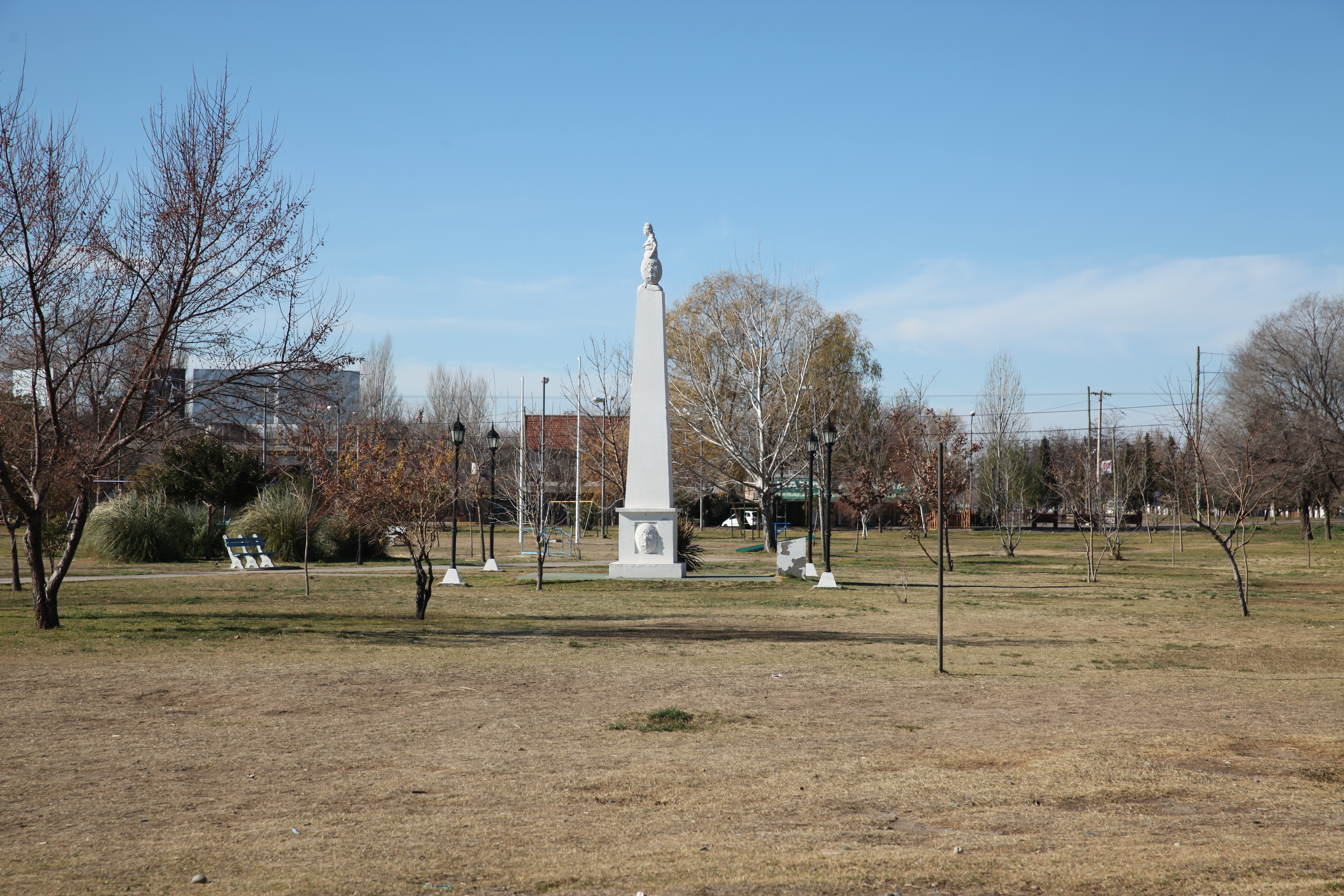
- A memorial in Confluencia Department

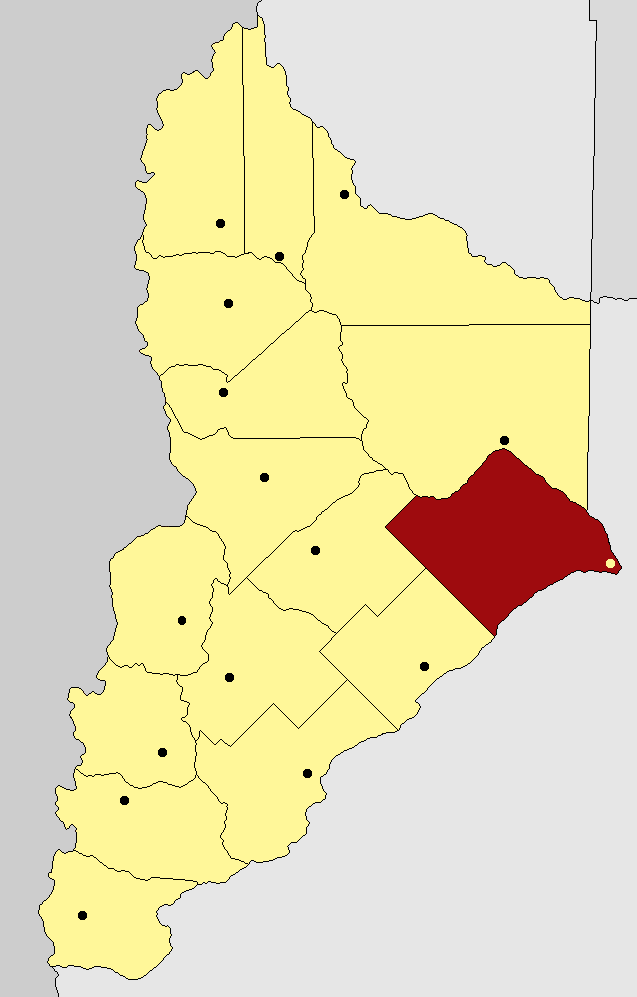
- Country: Argentina
- Province: Neuquén
- Capital: Neuquén

Area
  - Total: 7,352 km^{2} (2,839 sq mi)

Population (2022)
  - Total: 468,794
  - Density: 63.76/km^{2} (165.1/sq mi)
- Important cities: Neuquén: Plottier; Villa el Chocón; Plaza Huincul; Cutral Có; Senillosa; Vista Alegre; Sausal Bonito

Confluencia is a department located in the east of Neuquén Province in Argentina. Neuquén, the capital city of the province, is located in this department. The department is named Confluencia after the confluence of the rivers Neuquén and Limay.

== Geography ==
The department borders on the north with Añelo Department, on the east and southeast with Rio Negro Province, on the southwest with Picún Leufú Department and with Zapala Department on the west.

== Economy ==
=== Agriculture ===
Agriculture is one of the most important activities in the area. The major productions in the zone are apples, peaches and pears.

=== Power sources ===
==== Electricity ====
In Confluencia Department there are many important power sources. In Villa El Chocón is located El Chocón Dam, one of the most important electricity sources of the country, with Yacyretá Dam located in Misiones Province. The power generated by the dam is 222 MVA for each generator, and 180 MVA for each transformer. A new kind of production of energy used in the province, as in the department, is wind power but on a small scale.

==== Petroleum ====
In the Confluencia Department area, petroleum is extracted mostly in the El Chocón area.

== Culture ==
In the department there are important museums located in the capital city, Neuquén, and an important paleontologic museum located in Villa el Chocón managed by Ruben Carolini, who discovered one of the most important pieces in exhibition at the museum, the Giganotosaurus carolinii in 1995.
