= Neuquén–Cipolletti bridges =

Neuquén–Cipolletti bridges Puentes Neuquén–Cipolletti
- Carries: Road vehicles Trains
- Crosses: Neuquén River
- Locale: Neuquén; Cipolletti
- Owner: Government of Argentina

Characteristics
- Material: Iron

History
- Designer: Karl Krag
- Construction start: 1899
- Inaugurated: July 1902; 123 years ago (first bridge)

The Neuquén-Cipolletti bridges are a series of four bridges that connect the cities of Neuquén and Cipolletti by spanning the Neuquén River, in Argentina. Three parallel ones, two road bridges and a railway bridge, were built on a former herd wrangling path. The fourth one was built upstream.

By 1899 the expansion of the Buenos Aires Great Southern Railway reached the station that later would become Cipolletti. To continue to the Neuquén Territory, a steel railway bridge was constructed in 1899–1902 to cross the Neuquén River. After the railroad connected Neuquén Station on the Confluencia settlement, the capital of the Territory was moved to the area, and the city of Neuquén founded in 1904.

Vehicular and pedestrian crossings of the river were made using boats and canoes at that time. By the 1930s, the service was overwhelmed by the growing population. The first road bridge opened 1937, while new road bridges opened in 1997 and 2017.

== Background ==
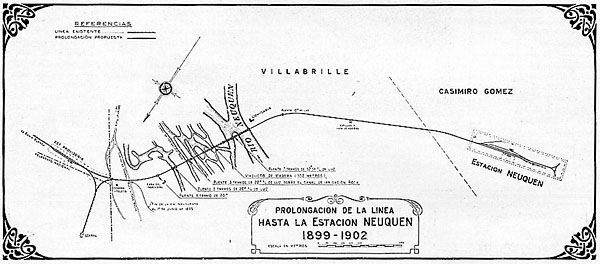
Map of the proposed expansion of the railway to the Neuquén National Territory in 1899

In 1896, due to territorial disputes with Chile, the Argentinian Government commissioned the British-owned company Buenos Aires Great Southern Railway (Spanish: Ferrocarril del Sud) to expand the existing railroad tracks from the city of Bahía Blanca, in the Buenos Aires Province, to the Neuquén National Territory. The expansion of the railroad was aimed at facilitating the quick transport of troops and supplies to the Chilean border in case of war. A previous contract proposal by the Southern Railway was rejected in 1895 by the Argentine Chamber of Deputies, as the company desired to lay tracks until General Roca, Río Negro or the confluence of the Limay and Neuquén rivers to avoid building a bridge on the site of the current city of Neuquén. The Chamber of Deputies felt that the construction of a railway bridge was necessary to guarantee the movement of Argentinian troops to the rest of the region in case the river flooded. By that time, the capital of the Neuquén National Territory was located in the city of Chos Malal. The journey between the city of Buenos Aires and the capital of the Territory lasted fifteen days, while the mail service arrived once a month.

On August 31, 1899, the expansion of the railroad reached the station Km. 1,190 (later renamed Limay Station). The contract for the expansion, signed on March 16, 1896, established that the corporation F.C. Sud was to build a railroad bridge over the Neuquén River to continue the expansion of the tracks to the Neuquén National Territory. Across the river, the isolated Confluencia settlement was formed by Spanish and Italian immigrants. Living in a sparse group of houses, the settlers' economy was sustained by the agriculture, while they depended on boat and canoe services to cross the river and remain communicated with the rest of the country.

== Railway bridge ==
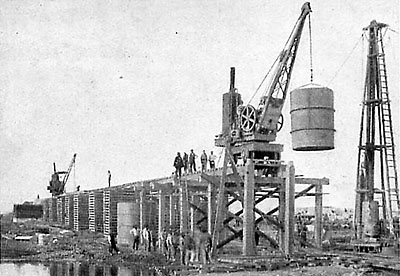
Construction of the railway bridge, 1901

The construction of the railway bridge was assigned to engineer Karl Krag. Due to several floods of the river during the tests of the ground, Krag decided to build the bridge 100 meters upstream from the original planned point, on the margin of the river that was used as a cross by herd wranglers. An island located in the middle of the river was used to build the columns of the bridge while the water was low.

Krag arrived in September 1899 to survey the area to find the most suitable location to build the bridge. The findings of Krag were reported to the London consultants Livesey & Henderson that projected the construction of a structure of seven spans, each 52.2 metres (171 ft) long; and a 352-metre (1,155 ft) wooden trestle approach viaduct. The steel sections, nuts, bolts and rivets were sent from Birmingham, United Kingdom. Unsuitable to be used for the abutment and foundations, the local rock and sand was replaced by material brought from Pichi Mahuida. A tide gauge was placed in Paso de los Indios, one of the headwaters of the Neuquén River to measure the changes on the water level. The telegraph office at Paso de los Indios would update mornings and nights the workers with the level of water expected at construction site within 24 to 30 hours. A second tide gaude at Chos Malal would alert the site 60 hours ahead of time. During the construction, the workers camped in tents on the left bank, while during the summer they moved to nearby bulrush shacks. The process marked the first use in Argentina of compressed air in construction, implemented to build the foundations with caissons. A general store that received supplies from Ingeniero White twice a week was established for the workers to buy wares at low prices, while a cargo depot had to be built close to the construction site.

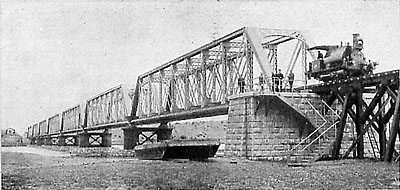
The finished railway bridge, 1902

The construction of the bridge was interrupted by three floods that destroyed tracks and makeshift bridges and interrupted traffic. On July 12, 1900, a telegraph message from Paso de los Indios warned the construction site of an upcoming major flood of the river. The initial report indicated that the waters raised 1.7 metres (5.6 ft), while an update the next morning showed 6 metres (20 ft) and raising. The staff was then ordered to move everything from the construction site to safety at Limay Station only leaving behind provisory bridges and tracks. Two boats and a speedboat, all steam powered, were ordered to remain on the southern bank and to maintain constant pressure day and night. By 8 PM, the station at Paso de los Indios registered a height of 8 metres (26 ft) to 9 metres (30 ft). After the waters raised to 3.5 metres (11 ft) by 10 PM at the construction site, all work was interrupted. The highest part of the construction, two cylinders that held the airlock were visible due to a wave that rose above them. Five men on a shack who refused to move to higher ground needed to be rescued, as well as some of the workers of the general store. Two rescue trips by one of the small boats were successful, while during the third trip it capsized throwing all three of the rescued men to the waters. The workers reached the roof of the shack where they were previously trapped, and they were later rescued by the powerboat.

The construction works were soon resumed, and by June 26, 1901, the completed bridge was load tested. On July 12, 1902, it was officially opened for traffic. The first passing locomotive, number 205, was operated by engineer Antonio Mazzarolo, accompanied by fireman Francesco Della Negra. Neuquén Station was built on the other side of the river, on the rural Confluencia settlement. The same year, a resolution of the territorial disputes with Chile was negotiated with British intervention. By 1904, Governor Buquet Roldán decided to move the capital of the Neuquén Territory from Chos Malal to the Confluencia settlement, and founded Neuquén City. The move was leveraged by the railroad, that shortened travel time between the Territory and Buenos Aires to a maximum of three days.

=== Gallery ===
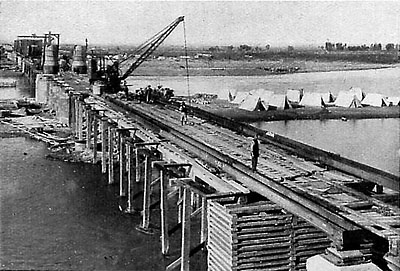
Bridge under construction, 1901

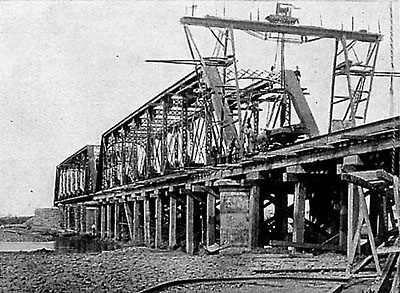
Advanced construction, late 1901

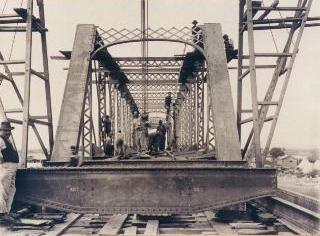
Construction near its end, 1902

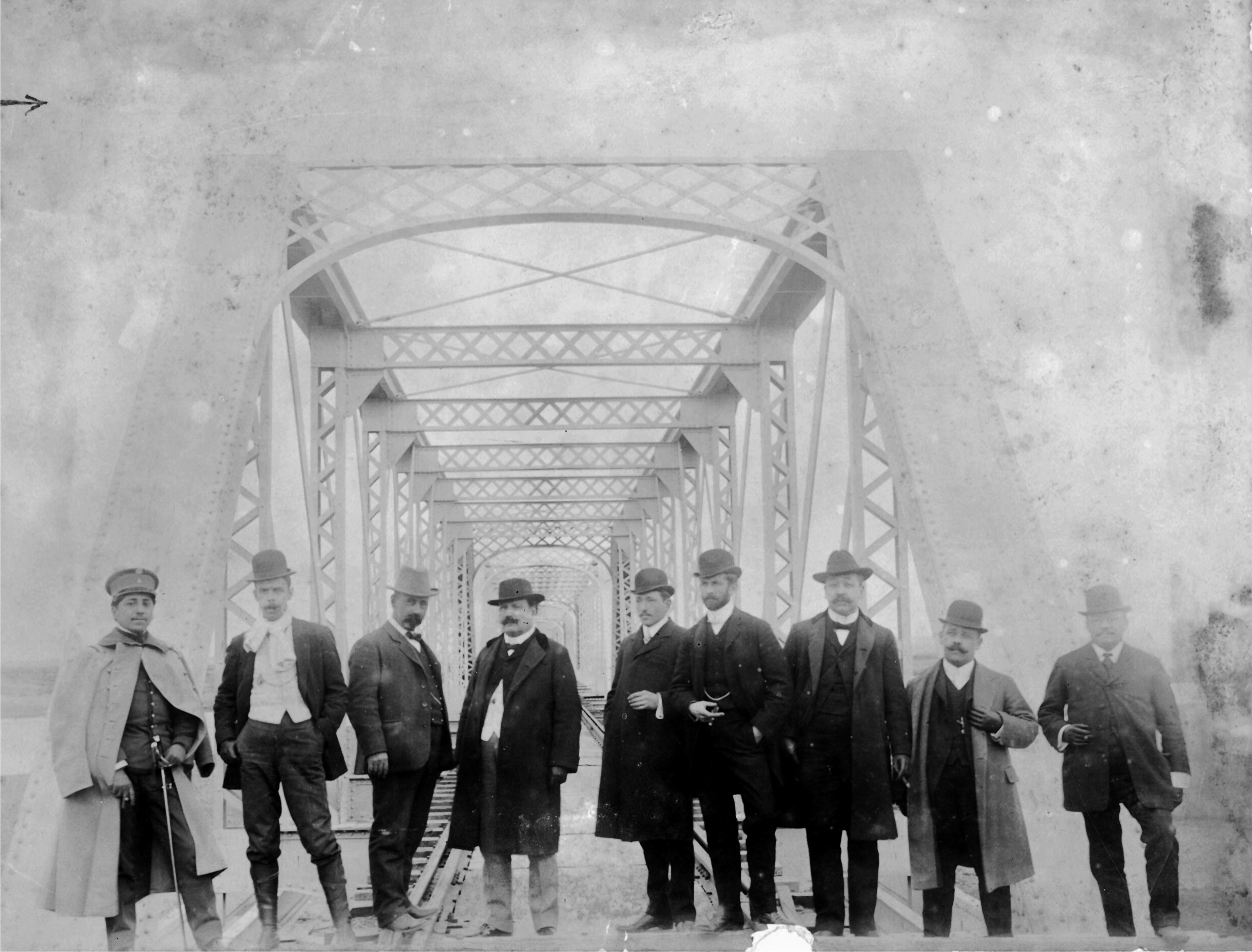
Men posing in front of the bridge soon after its opening

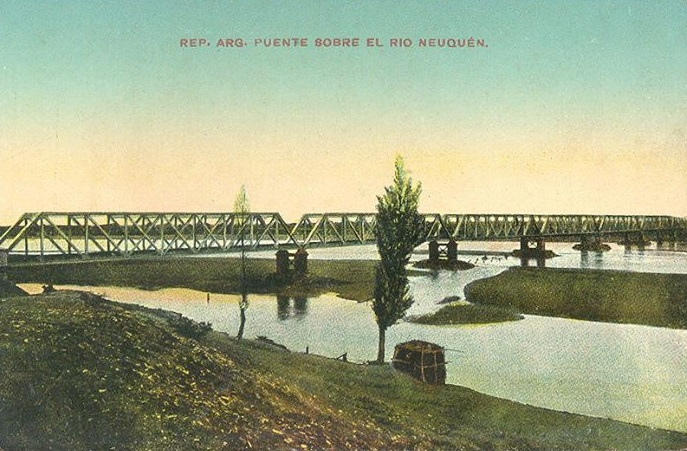
Postcard depicting the bridge

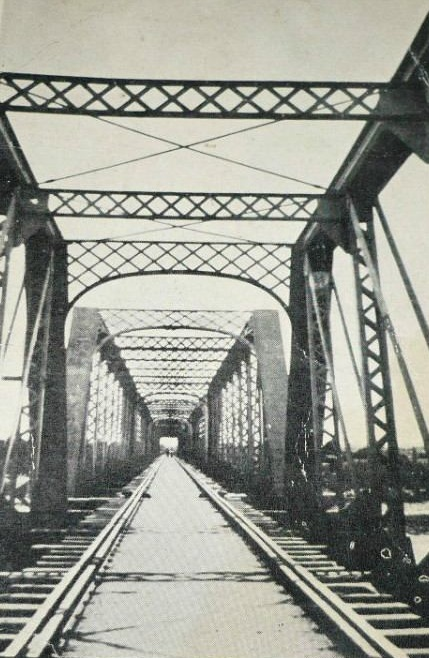
View of the bridge from its deck

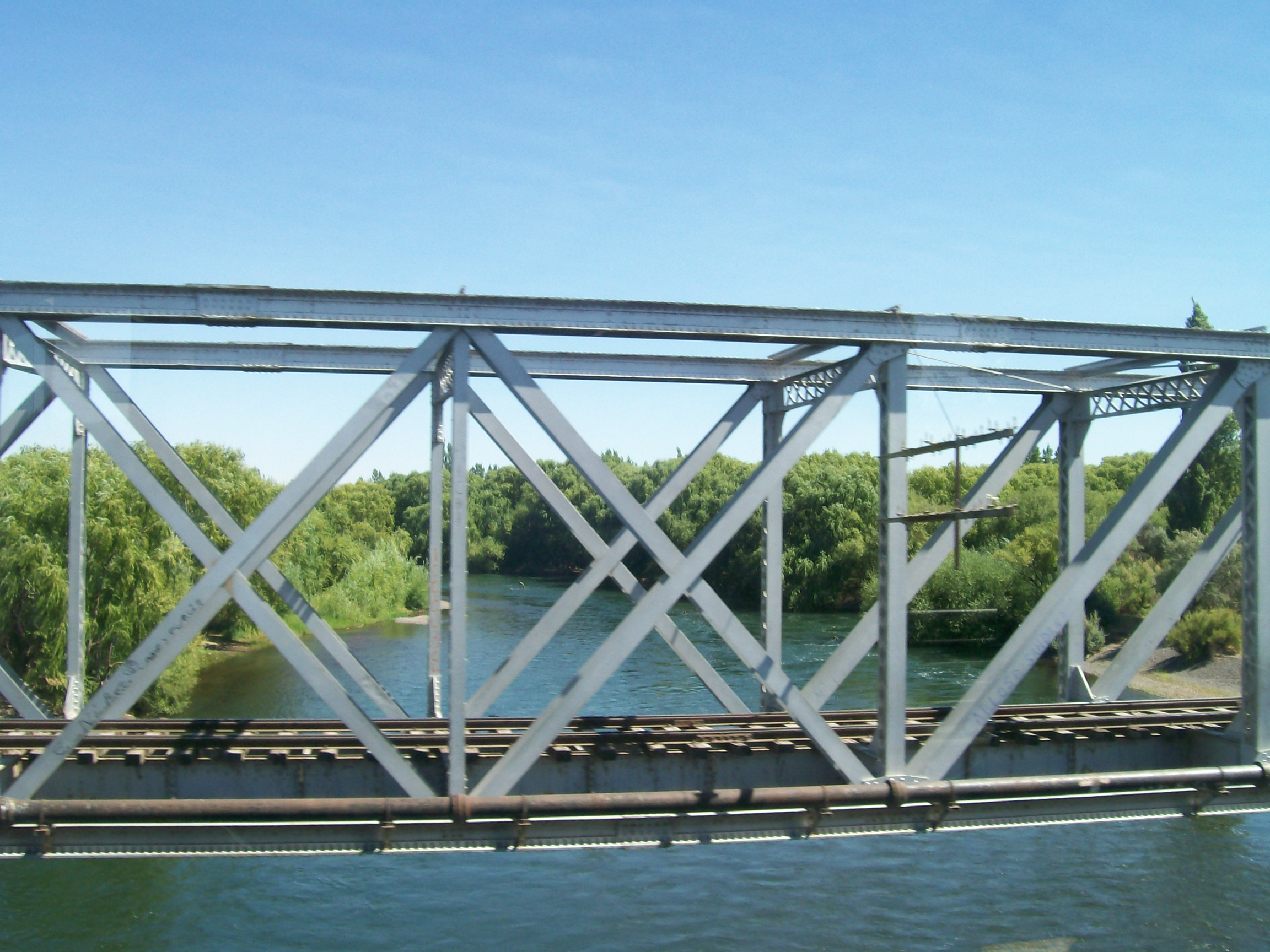
Side view of the bridge

== Old road bridge ==
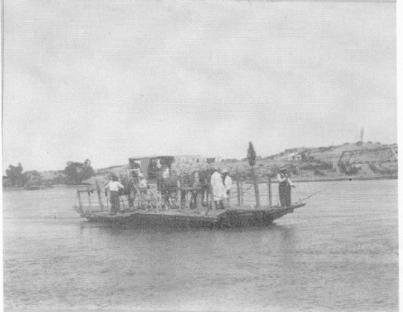
Ferry crossing the river in 1910, before the bridge was built

Following the opening of the railway bridge, pedestrian cross was facilitated by the new structure, while boats and canoes still constituted the main crossing for pedestrian and vehicle transportation. As the population grew, by the 1930s the boat services became insufficient. After several complaints and stories published in the local press, Governor Carlos H. Rodríguez requested of the National Directorate of Roadways (Spanish: Dirección Nacional de Vialidad) the construction of a road bridge. The structure was to be built next to the railway bridge, in the cross of the former herd wrangling path. The construction was assigned to the German-owned company GEOPÉ. The cornerstone was laid on May 26, 1935, by the new governor, Enrique Raimundo Pilotto. The construction deadline was set for April 15, 1937.

The structure was formed by nine spans of 51.6 metres (169 ft), united with 6 metres (20 ft)-wide concrete tied arches. Two 1 metre (3.3 ft) sidewalks were built on each side with 1 metre (3.3 ft) guard rails. The abutment was built over four-armed concrete cylinders that reached a depth of 12 metres (39 ft) under the soil of the river. Each of the eight columns of the bridge were founded over two-armed concrete cylinders, with the depth of 12 metres (39 ft). The road was 6 metres (20 ft) wide, while the bridge had a height of 15 metres (49 ft). On Neuquén's side, 55 cubic metres (1,900 cu ft) of land were removed to create a ten-metre wide roadway. The total cost of the works, and compensations for expropriations amounted to ARS$920,700.

By February 1937, the works initially directed by engineer Poenitz, and later continued by Lettner were finished two months ahead of schedule. Businessman Otto Max Neumann organized the opening ceremony. On February 20, 1937, the bridge was inaugurated by Governor of Neuquén Enrique Raimundo Pilotto and Cipolletti citizen Augusto Mengelle, who represented the absent Governor of Rio Negro. Two thousand citizens attended the opening, while a caravan of 300 cars crossed the bridge, following the car of Neuquén's Governor.

=== Gallery ===
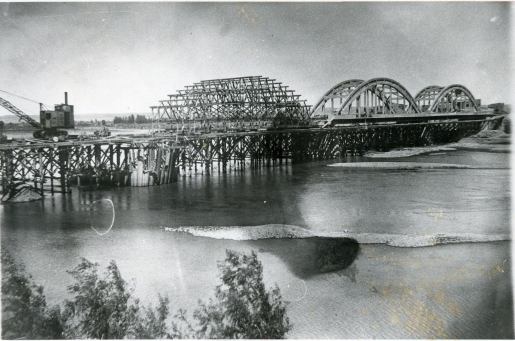
The bridge under construction

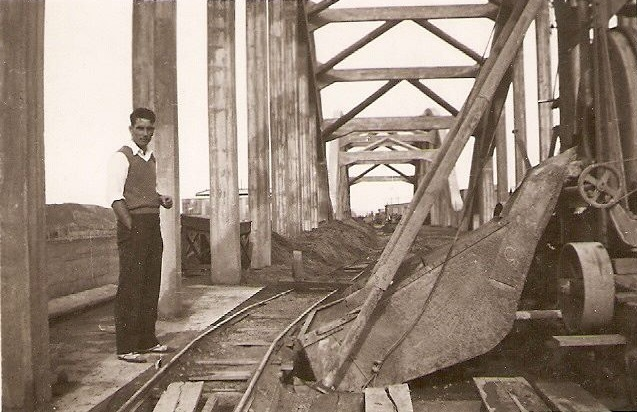
Construction site, 1936

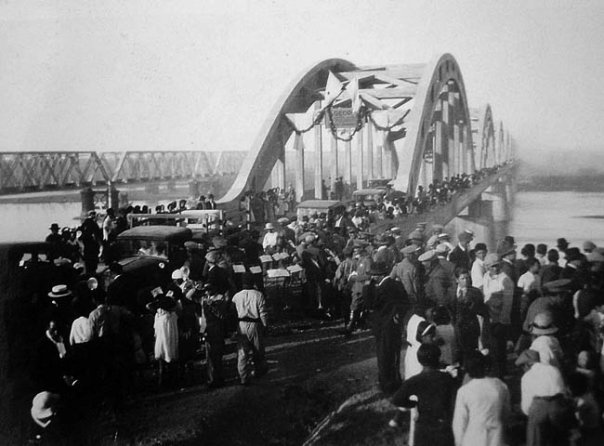
Inauguration in 1937

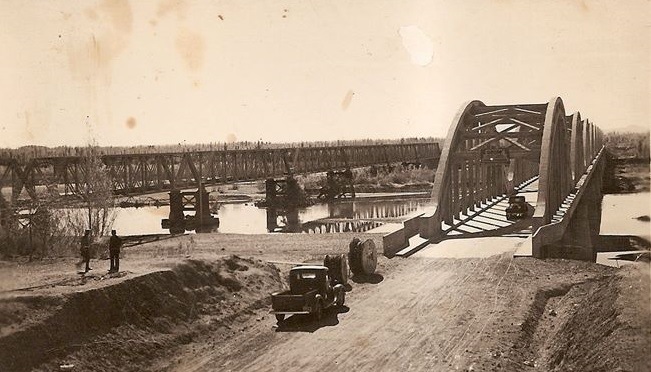
View of both, railway and road bridges

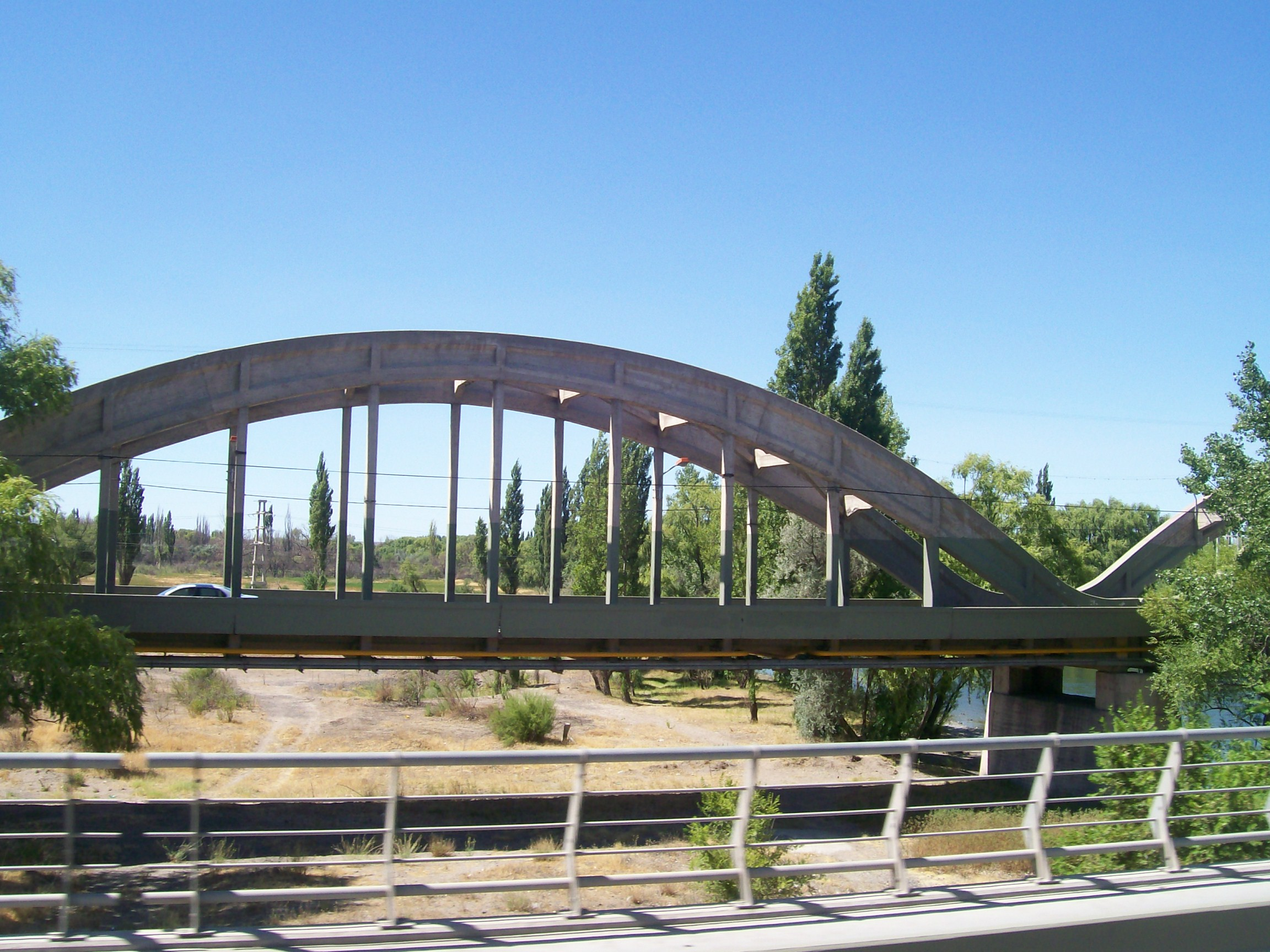
Side view of the bridge

== Second and third road bridges ==
By the 1980s, as traffic grew, the two-way old bridge became insufficient for the traffic demand. Jams and saturation of the roads during the rush hour led the National Directorate of Roadways to include in its 1987 construction plans a new bridge, to be built parallel to the old bridge. Raúl Martínez, the president of the Directorate, visited the area to negotiate an agreement between the cities of Cipolletti and Neuquén. Both cities were unable to reach a mutual consensus on the location of the bridge, causing the National Directorate of Roadways to drop the project. In 1992, the two cities reached an agreement: to build a new road bridge between the existing one and the railroad bridge. The deal included the construction of toll booths for the new and old bridges, operated by the private company Caminos Del Valle S.A. The profits would be allocated to the finance of the construction of a third bridge upstream, to further alleviate traffic congestion. The project reconfigured part of the National Route 22, making a couplet of the two bridges, with the old bridge being limited to eastbound traffic (from Neuquén towards Cipolletti) and the new one limited to westbound traffic (from Cipolletti towards Neuquén). Construction works on the second road bridge started in 1995, and the structure opened to traffic in 1997.

By that time, Caminos del Valle failed to construct the third bridge, citing governmental bureaucratic reasons. The construction of the third bridge started in 2002, with the site located upstream from the three existing bridges. The structure measured 250 metres (820 ft) long and 10 metres (33 ft) wide. 32 hectares (79 acres) of land were expropriated from eleven owners, including apple producer Moño Azul S.A. The construction cost was estimated at ARS$6 million, and the bridge was completed in 2007. In 2013, the toll booths were removed as the contract of Caminos del Valle expired. The National Directorate of Roadways continued the works on the third bridge, and announced the opening for 2015.

The third bridge opened in October 2017. The ceremony was attended by Argentina's president, Mauricio Macri, the governors of the Neuquén and Rio Negro Provinces Omar Gutiérrez and Alberto Weretilneck respectively, and transport minister Guillermo Dietrich among other officials. The structure opened without the finished interchanges intended to merge traffic more safely from the provincial route 7 from Neuquén city and Centenario towards Cipolletti, as well as the northern highway (Autovía Norte) to connect Plottier. The local representative of the Transport Department attributed the lack of the interchanges to the "societal pressure" to open the third bridge, while he noted the need for a fourth bridge. By 2020, the provinces of Neuquén and Rio Negro moved all truck traffic to the third bridge while a ban for their use of the first two bridges was banned. the following year, further works on the interchanges continued and more lighting was added.

== Notable events ==
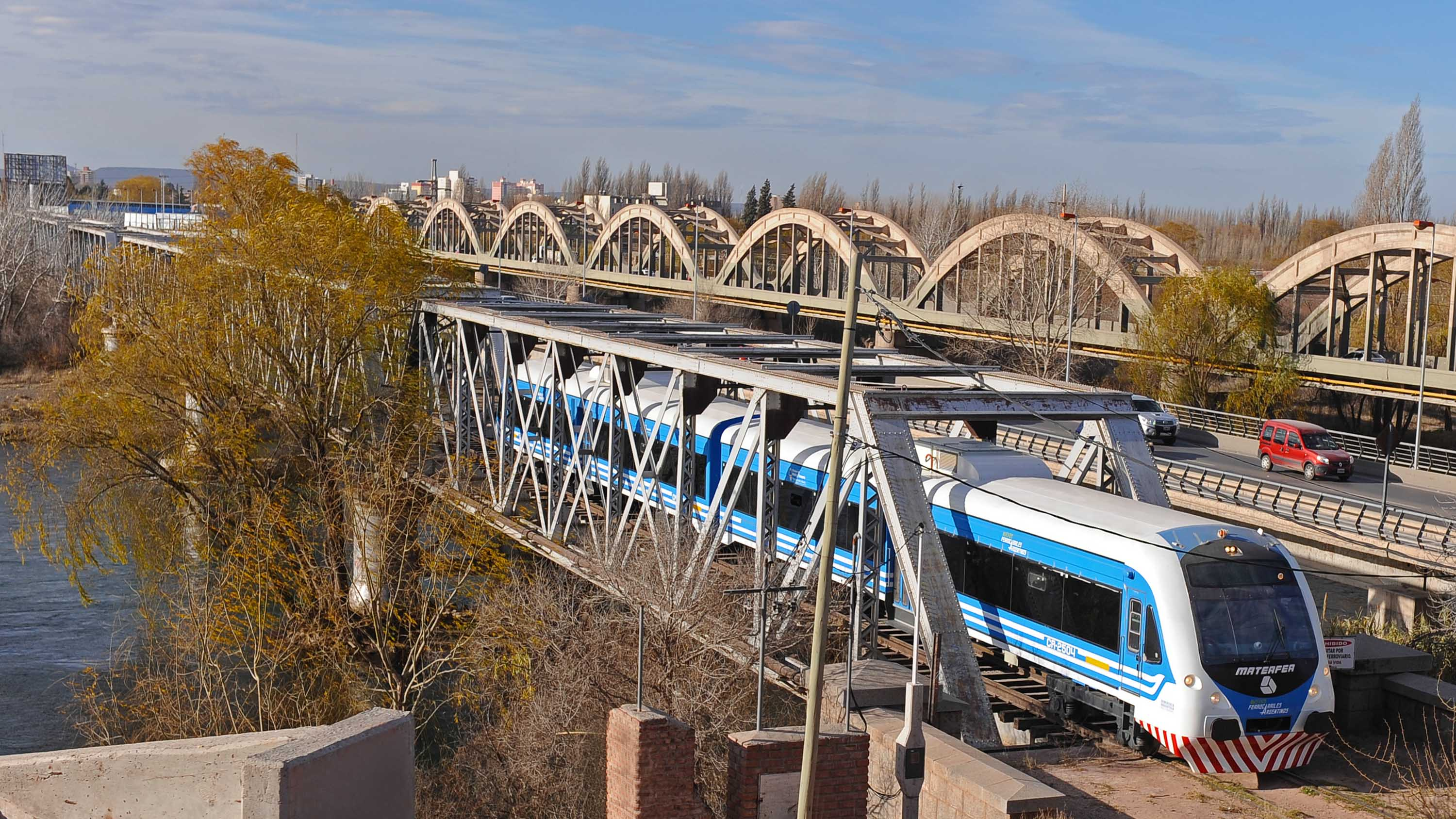
Tren del Valle crossing the railway bridge during preliminary tests, July 2015

In March 1997, a series of demonstrations by education trade unions took place in the Neuquén Province. The Argentine Confederation of Education Workers (CTERA –; Spanish: Confederación de Trabajadores de la Educación de la República Argentina) blocked the road bridges. By disrupting traffic, the blockade affected product supply to the city of Neuquén. At the time, the city produced ten percent of its consumed products, while the rest was transported to it in trucks. The 2,000-protester sitdown strike was broken on March 28, by a force of 300 men of the Provincial police and National Gendarmerie. Protesters were dispersed with tear gas and rubber bullets, with a toll of six wounded. Reacting to the incidents, CTERA launched a 24-hour national strike. Following the original block, throughout the years several protests in Neuquén city mirrored the act.

The use of the railway bridge was included in the route of the Tren del Valle, the reactivation of the inter-city passenger services. A cracked column of the bridge, which previously had a makeshift pallet reinforcement was repaired. The test of the bridge and tracks was performed on July 9, while the official opening of the line that initially will connect Neuquén and Cipoletti is planned for July 20.
