= National Route 22 (Argentina) =

Highway in Argentina

National Route 22
- Ruta nacional 22

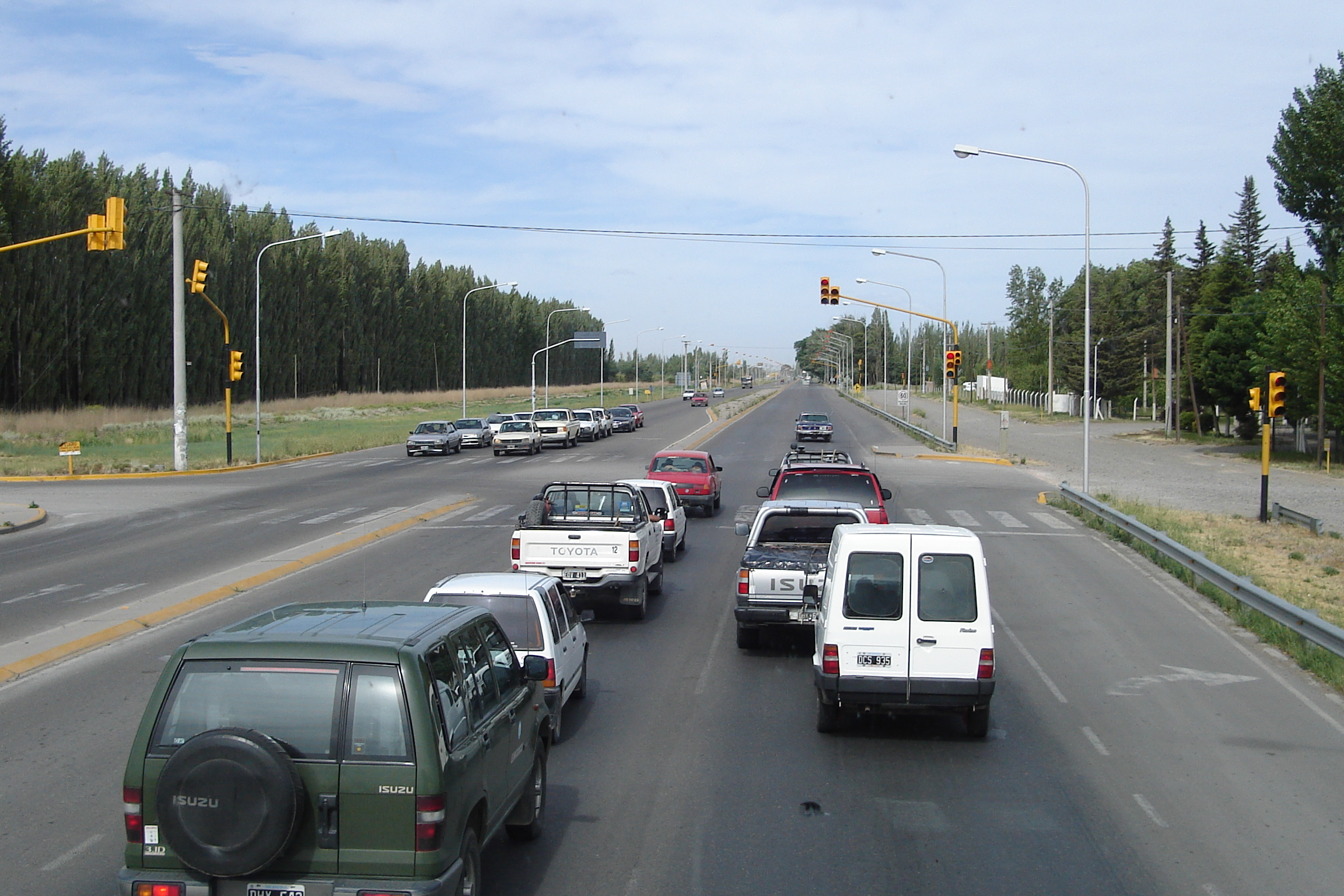
- National Route 22 in Neuquén City.

Route information
- Length: 685 km (426 mi)

Major junctions
- Western end: Zapala
- Eastern end: Bahía Blanca

Location
- Country: Argentina

Highway system
- Highways in Argentina

National Route 22 (Spanish: Ruta Nacional 22) is a highway located in Argentina, that connects the provinces of Buenos Aires, La Pampa, Río Negro and Neuquén in 685 km (426 mi). The route starts at the connection with National Route 3 (Argentina), 32 km (20 mi) west of Bahía Blanca. Until 2004 the highway end was in Paso de Pino Hachado, on the border with Chile, but currently ends on the connection with National Route 40 (Argentina) in Zapala. The track between Las Lajas and Paso de Pino Hachado is now part of National Route 242. The Highway has two lanes, mostly; only the Cipolletti - Plottier track has 4 lanes.
