= Neuquén – Plottier – Cipolletti =

Agglomeration in Rio Negro Province, Argentina

Coordinates: 27°27′05″S 58°59′12″W

Neuquén – Plottier – Cipolletti is an urban agglomeration in Argentina that joins the cities of Neuquén, Cipolletti and Plottier, on the provinces of Neuquén and Río Negro. The settlement is at the confluence between the rivers Limay and Neuquén, forming the Río Negro ("black river"). This zone is known as Comahue and is the most important settlement of population in Patagonia.

== Population ==
At the 2001 Census the population was 324,642, an increase of 20.4% over the 269,535 inhabitants in 1991. The population rose again to 383,060 at the 2010 Census, and at the 2022 census, Neuquén – Plottier – Cipolletti with 500,336 inhabitants was the 10th largest agglomeration in Argentina. Agriculture is the main economic activity of the region.

== Geography ==
Neuquén – Plottier – Cipolletti is located in the valley of the Neuquén and Limay rivers, denominated "Alto Valle". The northern part of the city of Neuquén lies over the Río Neuquén, and the southern part over the Río Limay; Plottier is very close to the south of the Limay River; and Cipolletti lies to the left bank of the Neuquén River.
