= Plottier =

- City
- Location within Neuquén Province Location within Argentina
- Coordinates: 38°57′S 68°14′W
- Country: Argentina
- Province: Neuquén
- Department: Confluencia

Government
  - Mayor: Luis Bertolini (Citizen Progress)
- Elevation: 260 m (850 ft)

Population (2022 census)
  - Total: 52,291
- Time zone: UTC−3 (ART)
- CPA base: Q8316
- Dialing code: +54 0299
- Climate: BWk

Plottier is a city located in the Confluencia Department, in Neuquén Province, Argentina. The population at the 2022 Census was 52,291 inhabitants, but the city is also part of the Neuquén - Plottier - Cipolletti urban agglomeration with over 500,000 inhabitants at the 2022 Census, which straddles the boundaries of Neuquén and Rio Negro provinces. It is about 15 km from Neuquén City, which turns this city into an important place for the population. Plottier is located near the Limay River and it is crossed by the 22 National Route.

== History ==
The city takes its name from the founder of the city, Dr. Alberto Plottier, an Uruguayan doctor who established an agrarian settlement at the beginning of the century.

== Geography ==
The ground in the valley is wet, composed of sands, gravels and consolidated limos. Over the hills, the ground is composed by Pebbles denominated tehuelche Pebble. The most old grounds are composed of sandstones, limonites and clayey where the color is mostly red.

=== Climate ===
The medium annual temperatures are between 57,2 °F (14 °C) and 53,6 (12 °C). The amount of water from the rain is less than 300 mm a year and the strong winds of the zone are between 12.42 mph (20 km/h) and 74.56 mph (120 km/h).

== History ==
After the Conquest of the Desert, General Julio Argentino Roca asked for lands near the Neuquén river for their strategic military value. These lands were called Colonia Sayhueque. The main economy of the region was the raising of cattle and sheep.

In 1916, Plottier was one of the tragic scenarios of the escape of prisoners from Neuquén prison. The engineer Adolfo Plottier was executed by one of the fugitives and the general grocery was looted.

Since 1920, the Plottier brothers started selling their lands for the establishment of immigrant settlers. As a result, the colonies el Triángulo, Colonia Suiza, San Eugenio, Viña del Río, San Agustín, y Colonización ferrocarril Sub —an English colony settled on April the 2nd— were formed.

On 26 March 1935, Agustín P. Justo, the president of the nation, recognized the formation of the Comisión de Fomento de Plottier, thereby recognizing the municipalization of this community. This date has not only been adopted as the most far-reaching date for the town but it also has been included in the Carta Orgánica Municipal.

== Economy ==
The main production of the zone is agriculture. Apples and pears are the main cultives. Other important activity in this area is the extraction of petroleum.

== Transport ==
The Tren del Valle commuter rail service links Plottier with neighbouring Neuquén and Cipolletti. Freight trains run to Bahía Blanca and Zapala.
