= Emilio Saraco Art Gallery =

Sala de Arte Emilio Saraco
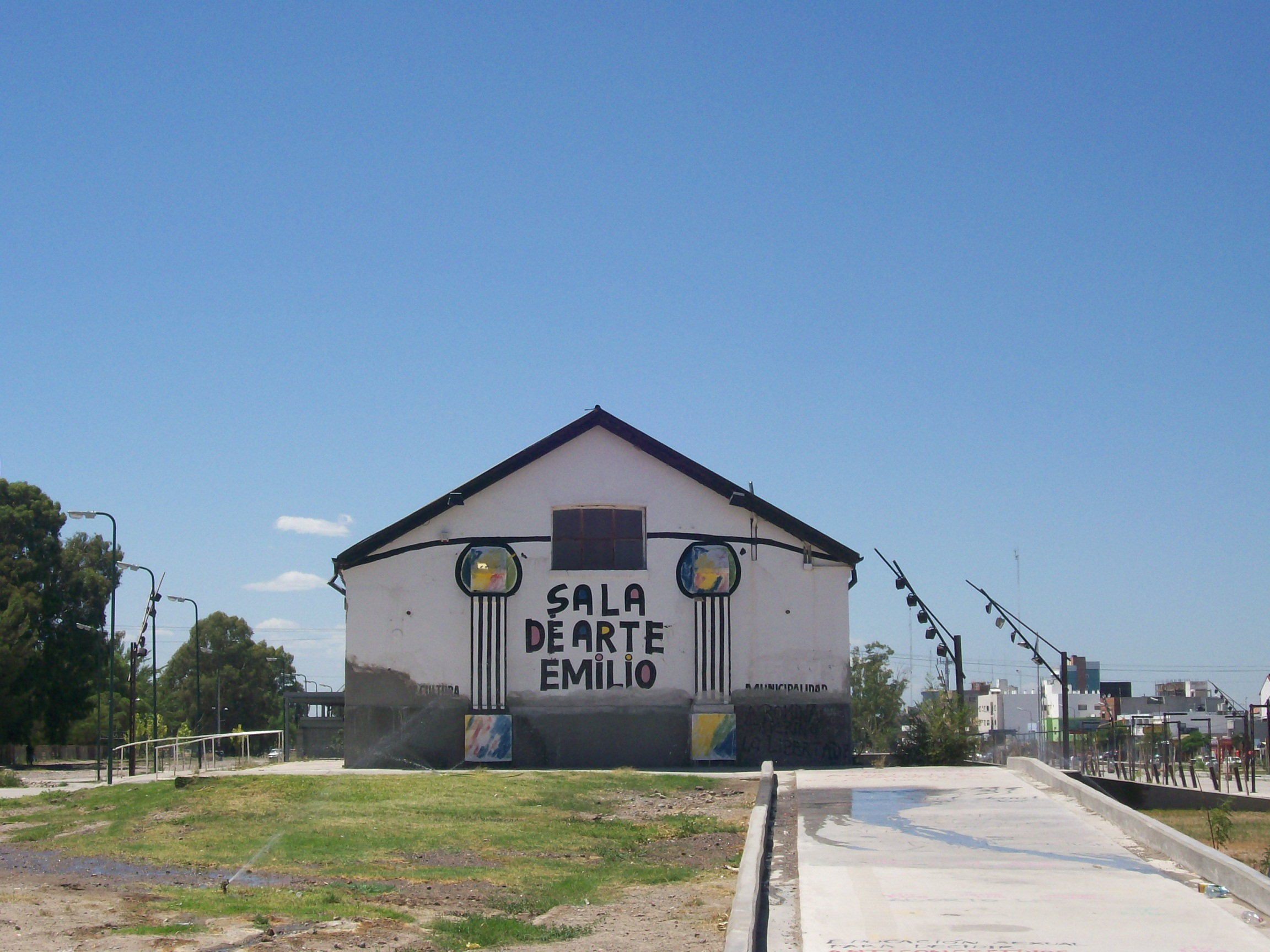
- The Emilio Saraco Art Gallery in 2009
- Established: 18 April 1992
- Location: Neuquén, Argentina
- Coordinates: 38°57′22.2″S 68°03′29.0″W
- Type: Visual arts

The Saraco Art Gallery (Spanish: Galería de Arte Emilio Saraco), founded in 1992, is located in Neuquén, Argentina, is considered one of the city's main cultural spaces. The 1911 originally railway building was declared of public and historic interest for the city. It mostly hosts visual art exhibitions from local artists.

== History ==
The British-owned company Buenos Aires Great Southern Railway constructed the building as a warehouse for parcels and loads in 1911, some years after the opening of the Neuquén station. It was subsequently acquired by the General Roca Railway, a division of the State-owned company Ferrocarriles Argentinos in 1948 during the railway nationalisation under the Juan Perón presidency.

The building belonged to the National railway system until the beginning of the 1990s when the railway network was privatised during the Menem administration. Instead of continuing its function as a railway building, it was passed to the Neuquén province authorities, who decided to reconvert it into an Art Gallery, which officially inaugurated on April 18, 1992 under the name of plastic artist Emilio Saraco, who contributed to the province's popular art. One year later, the Neuquén municipality took over the Gallery's administration.

== Architecture and exhibitions ==
The Gallery is located in front of the Neuquén railway station, on the city's Central Park. Declared as a public and historical patrimony of the city in 1993, it is one of the original railway constructions dating back to the years after the foundation. After a remodeling in 2019, the main entrance on the north side was changed to the south side and two windows were added with the original cypress wood gates from 1911 still in their place.

For decades, the Saraco Art Gallery has been the only one of its kind in the city and is therefore considered an important cultural space. It showcases mainly visual art exhibitions from local artists.
