= Neuquén =

Neuquén Neuquén Capital
- City
- Neuquén, Argentina

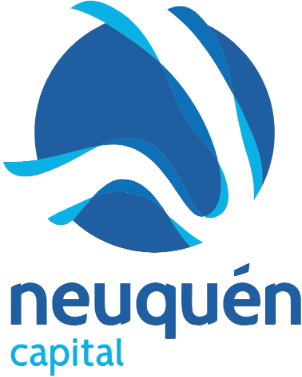
- Flag Logo

- Location within Neuquén Province Location within Argentina
- Coordinates: 38°57′09″S 68°03′51″W
- Country: Argentina
- Province: Neuquén
- Department: Confluencia
- Founded: 1904

Government
  - Intendant: Mariano Gaido (MPN)

Area
  - City: 128 km^{2} (49 sq mi)
- Elevation: 270 m (890 ft)

Population (2022 census)
  - Urban: 287,787
  - Urban density: 2,260/km^{2} (5,900/sq mi)
- Time zone: UTC−3 (ART)
- CPA base: Q8300
- Dialing code: +54 299
- Climate: BWk
- Website: neuquencapital.gov.ar

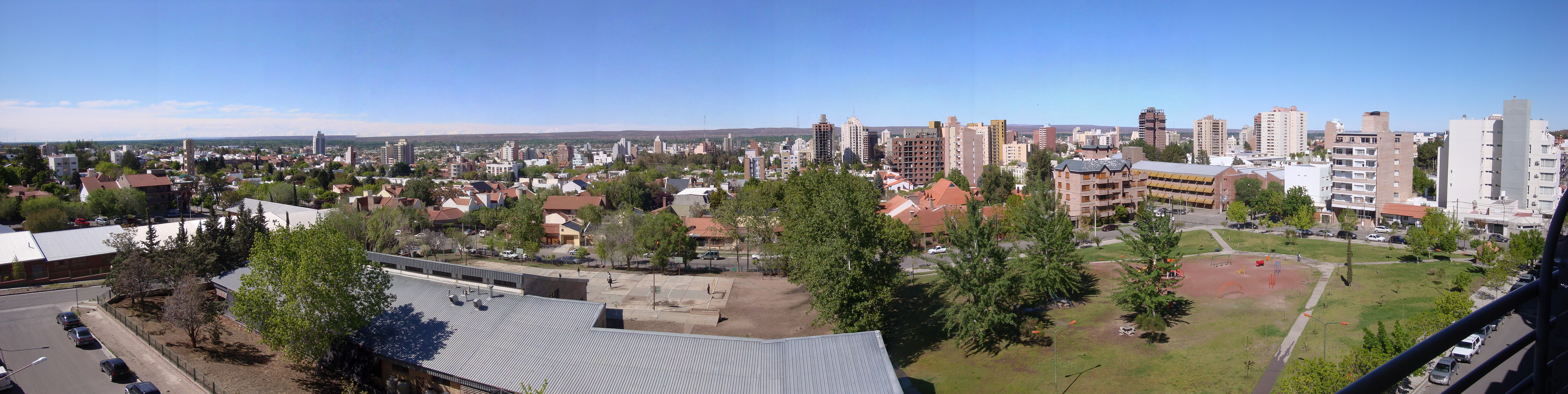
Panoramic view of Neuquén

Neuquén (Spanish pronunciation: [newˈken]; Mapudungun: Nehuenken) is the capital city of the Argentine province of Neuquén and of the Confluencia Department within that province, located in the extreme east of the province. It occupies a strip of land west of the confluence of the Limay and Neuquén rivers which form the Río Negro, making it part of the ecoregion of Alto Valle del Río Negro. The city had 287,787 inhabitants, and the surrounding Neuquén – Plottier – Cipolletti conurbation had a population of more than 500,000 at the 2022 Census, making it the largest urban agglomeration in Patagonia.

Founded in 1904, it is the newest provincial capital city in Argentina.

== Etymology ==
The name of the city comes from the Neuquén River, which in the Mapuche language means 'water that has strength'. This name was already used since 1884 for the federal territory. Since 1902, it was used for the railway station of the town, which at that time was a hamlet called Confluencia. The name of the town was officially chosen in 1904, when it was declared the capital of the territory. It is the only Argentine city that has a palindrome name, that is a word which reads the same backward as forward.

== Economy ==
Neuquén is both an important agricultural center, surrounded by fertile lands irrigated by the waters of the Limay and Neuquén rivers in an otherwise arid province, and a petrochemical industrial center that receives oil extracted from different points of the province. It belongs economically and geographically to the Alto Valle region that produces apples, pears, and other fruits.

With the discovery of the Vaca Muerta oil fields west of the city (the third largest shale gas and oil reserves in the world), it began experiencing a boom in real estate and construction. It has an airport, shopping centers, office spaces, and institutions to become the center of the operations of the oil and gas companies and their suppliers.

== Transport ==
National Route 22 (RN22) is the main road linking Neuquén with the rest of Argentina. Since 2021 it runs in eastern-western direction north of the city center through the Parque Industrial area, mostly as a four-lane motorway, linking the city with the Atlantic coast at Bahía Blanca to the East and Temuco (Chile), San Carlos de Bariloche and Zapala to the West and South-West. The former RN22, now called Avenida General Mosconi, a wide fast-transit avenue, runs in east-western direction through the southern part of the city center and divides the city into two halves.

The Presidente Perón Airport is 8 kilometres (5 miles) west of the city center near the boundary to Plottier and serves regular flights to Buenos Aires, Córdoba, Salta, Mendoza, Comodoro Rivadavia and San Martín de los Andes.

The Tren del Valle commuter rail service links Neuquén with neighbouring Cipolletti and Plottier. Freight trains run to Bahía Blanca and Zapala.

Local transport consists of 30 bus lines, connecting most areas of the city, including Plottier and Las Perlas. The network is run by bus companies Ko-Ko and Empresa Tigre Iguazú. Additionally, several suburban lines connect the city with other cities and towns in the wider metro area, like Cipolletti, Centenario, Senillosa, General Roca and Villa Regina.

While the Río Negro and Río Limay are navigable, there are no port facilities in Neuquén and nearby cities. There was some commercial navigation in the Alto Valle area in the first half of the 20th century, but it has been abandoned since then.

== History ==
The first inhabitants of the area were very mobile and moved according to the seasons of the year, climatic conditions, and the abundance of food and game. Around the 16th century the people living in different areas of the province began to be assimilated by the Mapuche people. One of the most important trails used by the Mapuches passed through the area of the confluence of the Limay and Neuquén rivers.

In the 17th century European explorers arrived in the area of the confluence.

In 1604, Hernando Arias de Saavedra decided to explore the trails to Patagonia. With the support of the ranchers of Buenos Aires, Santa Fe, and Corrientes, he departed from Buenos Aires and passed through the mountains of the Sierra de la Ventana. He reached what is now the city of Neuquén and continued on, possibly passing through what is today Auca Mahuida.

In 1782, departing from Carmen de Patagones, Basilio Villarino traveled upstream on the Río Negro. On 23 January 1783, he arrived at the confluence of the Limay and Neuquén Rivers, camping on an island. He then followed the Limay to the confluence of the Collón Curá, then from there to the Chimehuin River.

=== Neuquén as an Argentine Province ===
In 1885, the lands of what was at that time called Confluencia (i.e., "confluence," referring to the two rivers) were auctioned to a few people. Shortly after the Conquest of the Desert campaign conducted by the military over Patagonia, the Tehuelche and Pehuenche tribes that inhabited the province of Neuquén were either killed or pushed out of these lands.

Since there was no defined border with Chile, the Argentine government reached an agreement with the British-owned Buenos Aires Great Southern Railway company that was constructing a railway network, mainly in Buenos Aires Province, to build an extension to the town in exchange for lands, in order to populate it. In 1899, the railroad reached Cipolletti in Río Negro province, and three years later, after the construction of the bridge, arrived at Neuquén.

Neuquén was officially founded on 12 September 1904, and the capital of the territory was transferred from Chos Malal to the young town. The name "Neuquén" derives from the Mapudungun word nehuenken, meaning drafty, which the native people used in reference to this river.

By 1930, the town had only 5,000 inhabitants. In the 1960s, it acquired a new importance when oil deposits were found in the province by the state company YPF. The 1970s and 1980s saw massive demographic growth, accompanied by improvements such as the creation of the National University of Comahue in 1971.

In 2020, Sister Mónica Astorga Cremona, a Carmelite nun, founded Costa Limay Sustainable Complex for Transgender Women in Neuquén, the first permanent housing program in the world for transgender people.

== Climate ==
Neuquén has an arid climate (Köppen BWk). Precipitation is low, averaging 200 millimetres (8 in) per year, which is fairly evenly distributed throughout the year. The mean annual temperature is between 14 and 15 °C (57 and 59 °F). During December and January, the mean temperature in these months is about 23 °C (73 °F) while in July, it reaches below 6 °C (43 °F). Being located far away from any major bodies of water, the thermal amplitude is high along with a large diurnal range, which indicates continental characteristics of the climate of the city.

Winds are moderately strong throughout the year, which favors evapotranspiration. Most of the wind comes from the west and the southwest, both of which occur 40–50% of the time. Summers tend to be windier than winters with average wind speeds ranging from a low of 8 km/h (5.0 mph) in July to a high of 16 km/h (9.9 mph) in December. Mean daily sunshine hours range from a high of 11 hours/day in January to a low of 3 hours/day in June.

The highest temperature recorded was 42.3 °C (108.1 °F) on 21 January 1980 while the lowest temperature recorded was −12.8 °C (9.0 °F) on 13 June 1961.

Climate data for Neuquén, Argentina (1991–2020, extremes 1900–present)
Month	Jan	Feb	Mar	Apr	May	Jun	Jul	Aug	Sep	Oct	Nov	Dec	Year
Record high °C (°F)	42.3 (108.1)	41.6 (106.9)	40.5 (104.9)	33.1 (91.6)	31.0 (87.8)	28.1 (82.6)	25.6 (78.1)	30.7 (87.3)	34.0 (93.2)	36.7 (98.1)	40.8 (105.4)	40.8 (105.4)	42.3 (108.1)
Mean daily maximum °C (°F)	32.1 (89.8)	30.6 (87.1)	27.4 (81.3)	21.8 (71.2)	16.6 (61.9)	13.3 (55.9)	13.1 (55.6)	16.1 (61.0)	19.3 (66.7)	22.9 (73.2)	27.1 (80.8)	30.3 (86.5)	22.6 (72.7)
Daily mean °C (°F)	24.1 (75.4)	22.4 (72.3)	19.1 (66.4)	13.7 (56.7)	9.5 (49.1)	6.8 (44.2)	6.0 (42.8)	8.3 (46.9)	11.7 (53.1)	15.5 (59.9)	19.5 (67.1)	22.6 (72.7)	14.9 (58.8)
Mean daily minimum °C (°F)	15.9 (60.6)	14.4 (57.9)	11.8 (53.2)	7.2 (45.0)	4.0 (39.2)	1.7 (35.1)	0.5 (32.9)	2.0 (35.6)	4.8 (40.6)	8.4 (47.1)	11.9 (53.4)	14.6 (58.3)	8.1 (46.6)
Record low °C (°F)	2.3 (36.1)	2.1 (35.8)	−5.3 (22.5)	−4.8 (23.4)	−10.5 (13.1)	−12.8 (9.0)	−11.8 (10.8)	−10.6 (12.9)	−7.0 (19.4)	−2.9 (26.8)	−0.9 (30.4)	−3.3 (26.1)	−12.8 (9.0)
Average precipitation mm (inches)	13.5 (0.53)	12.6 (0.50)	14.8 (0.58)	21.9 (0.86)	26.4 (1.04)	17.6 (0.69)	17.9 (0.70)	9.6 (0.38)	16.5 (0.65)	32.9 (1.30)	17.7 (0.70)	10.3 (0.41)	211.7 (8.33)
Average precipitation days (≥ 0.1 mm)	2.2	2.7	2.6	4.2	5.3	5.7	4.4	3.0	3.9	4.0	2.8	2.2	43.1
Average snowy days	0.0	0.0	0.0	0.0	0.1	0.5	0.4	0.1	0.1	0.2	0.0	0.0	1.4
Average relative humidity (%)	38.1	45.4	53.6	63.0	70.2	70.9	68.0	58.8	51.1	46.5	39.9	37.2	53.6
Mean monthly sunshine hours	322.4	299.5	263.5	207.0	148.8	117.0	148.8	176.7	189.0	248.0	279.0	282.1	2,681.8
Mean daily sunshine hours	10.4	10.6	8.5	6.9	4.8	3.9	4.8	5.7	6.3	8.0	9.3	9.1	7.4
Percentage possible sunshine	69.3	76.3	66.7	65.0	48.3	42.0	44.3	55.3	54.0	63.3	66.0	60.0	59.2
Source 1: Servicio Meteorológico Nacional
Source 2: Secretaria de Mineria (percent sun 1961–1990), Meteo climat (record highs and lows 1900–present)

== Museums and historical landmarks ==
There are cultural spaces housed in former railroad buildings from the early 20th century, such as the Gregorio Álvarez and the Paraje Confluencia museums and the Emilio Saraco Art Gallery. The more recently built Museo Nacional de Bellas Artes, designed by Mario Roberto Alvarez, opened in 2004. The museum showcases both national and international artists. The building consists of four halls which include both the temporary and the permanent collection, as well as an auditorium and theater.

A variety of historical monuments dating from the 20th century, such as the Fotheringham Crossing Pyramid in the Sapere neighborhood, can be found throughout the city.

== Sports ==
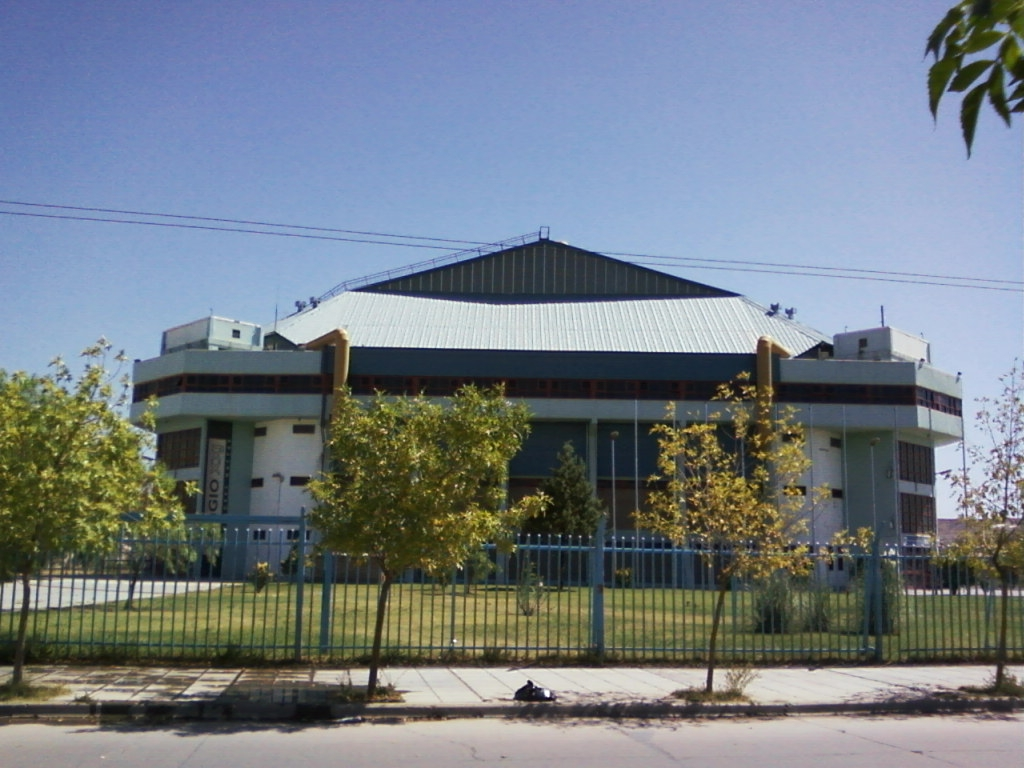
Estadio Ruca Che

Neuquén hosted the 2001 FIBA Americas Championship, where the city's basketball fans supported Argentina's national basketball team to win the gold medal. All games were played in the 8,000 seat Estadio Ruca Che. At the 1995 FIBA Americas Championship, Neuquén acted as co-host.

Since 2015, Neuquén has hosted the FIM Motocross World Championship: its race track at Villa La Angostura was voted the best of the season in the two following seasons.

== Sister cities ==
Neuquén is sister city, as designated by Sister Cities International with:

- Knoxville, Tennessee, United States
- Treviso, Veneto, Italy
- Valdivia, Chile

== Notable people ==
- Gabriel Arias (born 1987), dual Argentine-Chilean professional footballer and goalkeeper of the Chile national football team. Born in Neuquén
- Iñaki Basiloff (born 2001), Paralympic swimmer. Born in Neuquén
- Stephanie Beatriz (born 1981), American actress. Born in Neuquén
- Lorena Briceño (born 1978), Olympic judoka. Born in Neuquén
- Mauricio Carrasco (born 1987), professional footballer
- Mónica Astorga Cremona (born 1967), former Catholic nun, activist for trans women's rights
- Susana Freydoz (born 1951), former First Lady of Río Negro Province and convicted murderer
- Leandro Marín (born 1992), professional footballer. Born in Neuquén
- Amalia Pica (born 1978), expatriate artist in the UK. Born in Neuquén
- Fabián Sambueza (born 1988), professional footballer. Born in Neuquén
- Matías Sosa (born 1992), professional footballer. Born in Neuquén
- Eduardo Valdés (born 1956), National Deputy for the City of Buenos Aires. Grew up in Neuquén
