= Chichinales =

Coordinates: 39°06′S 66°56′W

- Municipality and village
- Interactive map of Chichinales
- Country: Argentina
- Province: Río Negro Province
- Department: General Roca Department, Río Negro
- Time zone: UTC−3 (ART)
- Climate: BSk

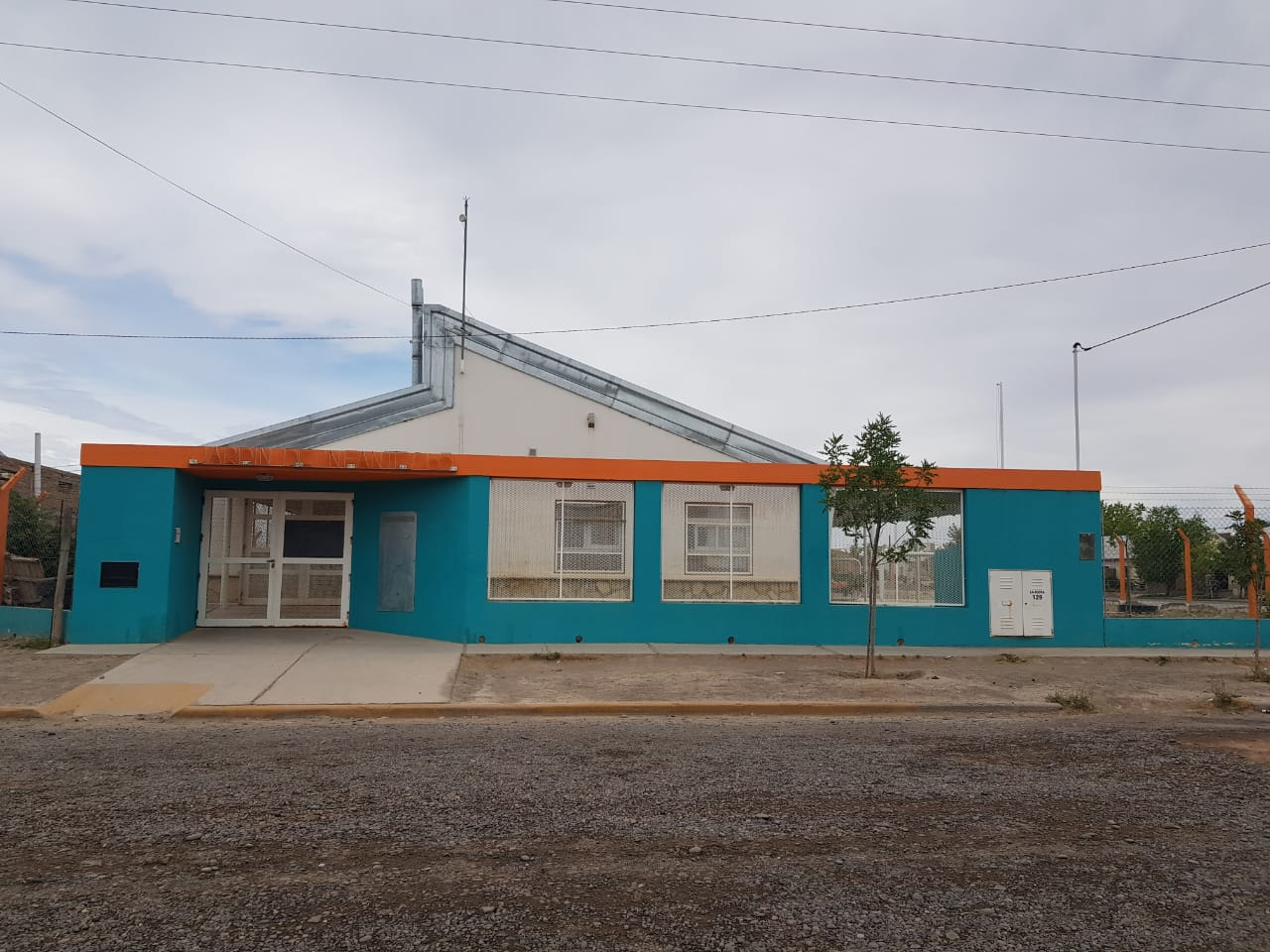
A school in Chichinales

Chichinales is a village and municipality in Río Negro Province in Argentina.
