= Cipolletti =

- City
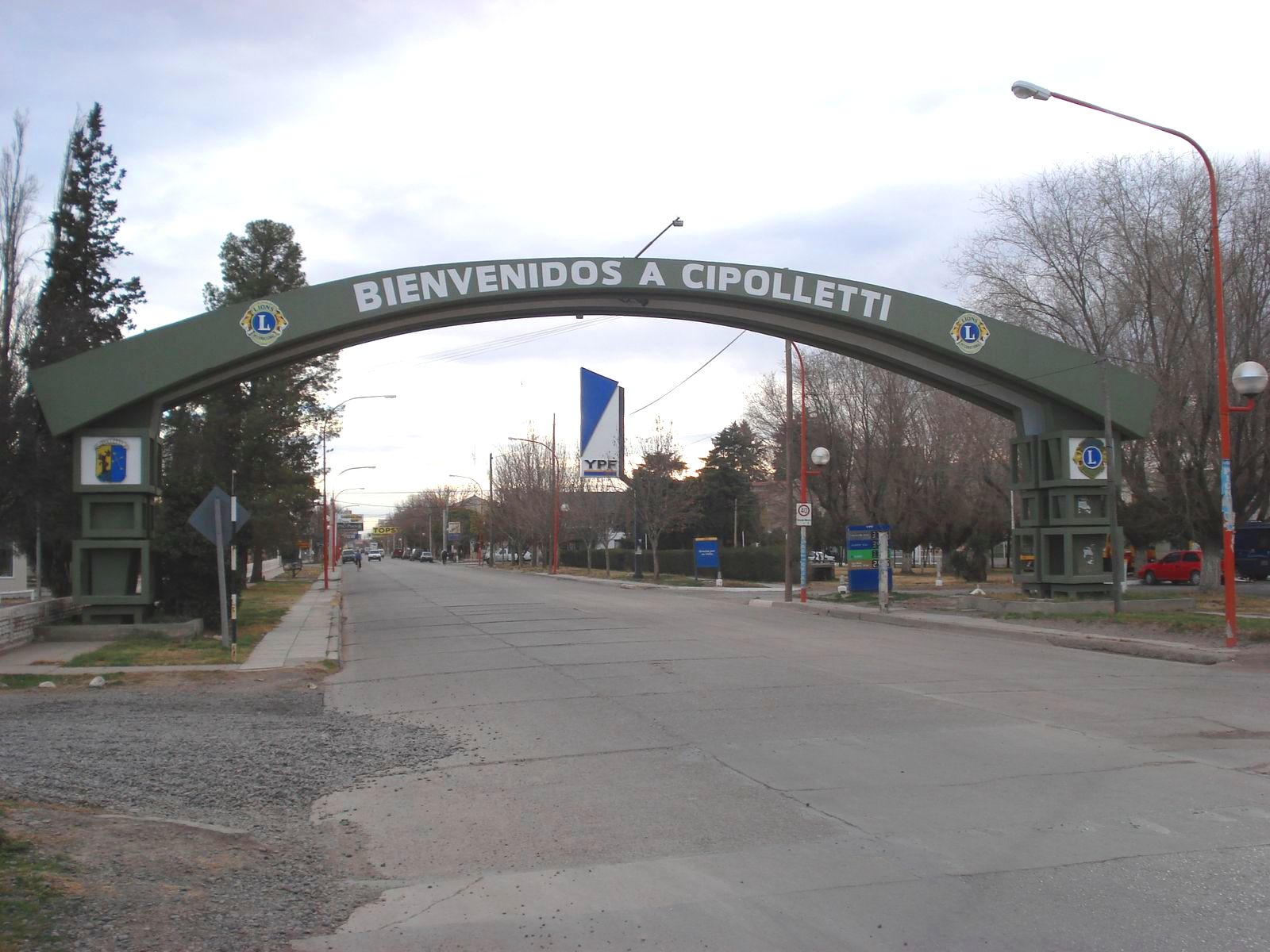

- Location of Cipolletti in Argentina
- Coordinates: 38°56′S 67°59′W
- Country: Argentina
- Province: Río Negro Province
- Department: General Roca
- Founded: October 3, 1903
- Founded by: Coronel Fernandez Oro

Government
  - Mayor: Claudio Di Tella (JSRN)

Area
  - Total: 52,547.8 km^{2} (20,288.8 sq mi)
- Elevation: 165 m (541 ft)

Population (2022 census)
  - Total: 95,524
  - Density: 20/km^{2} (52/sq mi)
- Demonym: cipoleño
- Time zone: UTC−3 (ART)
- CPA base: R8324
- Dialing code: +54 299
- Climate: BWk
- Website: Official website

Cipolletti (Spanish pronunciation: [sipoˈleti] or [tʃipoˈleti]) is a city in north of the Patagonian province of Río Negro, Argentina. With a population of 95,524 inhabitants at the 2022 census [INDEC], Cipolletti is the third-most populated settlement in the province, after San Carlos de Bariloche and General Roca. Together with the adjoining cities of Neuquén and Plottier, it forms the Greater Neuquén agglomeration, with a population of 500,336 people in 2022.

== History ==
Cipolletti was founded as a fort called Confluencia by General Lorenzo Vintter, in 1881. The name was changed later, after César Cipolletti, one of the forerunners of the study of the irrigation system of the Negro River, and heart of the apple and pear cultivation zone of the Alto Valle.

== Geography ==
The city is located on the north-eastern shore of the Neuquén River, just before it is joined by the Limay River to form the Negro River, a short distance upstream from the city of General Roca. Opposite Cipolletti, across the river, lies Neuquén, capital of the province of the same name, connected to it by road and railway bridges. Cipolletti's neighborhood of Las Perlas lies south of Neuquén, 14 km west from its city center, and has the character of an independent town.

=== Climate ===
Cipolletti has a borderline semi-arid climate (Köppen climate classification BSk/BWk). Winters are cool with a July mean of 6.0 °C (42.8 °F) and nighttime temperatures regularly drop below 0.0 °C (32.0 °F). Overcast days are common during the winter months, averaging 10–12 days from June to August. Spring and fall are variable seasons with temperatures that can reach up to 40 °C (104.0 °F) and below −7.0 °C (19.4 °F) although most days are warm during the day and cool during the night. Summers are hot, dry and sunny with a January mean of 21.9 °C (71.4 °F). Daytime temperatures average 30 °C (86.0 °F) while nighttime temperatures are cooler, averaging 15 °C (59.0 °F). Precipitation is low, averaging 213.7 millimetres (8 in), which is fairly evenly distributed throughout the year. The first date of frost occurs on May 4 while the last frost occurs on September 10. The highest temperature recorded was 43.8 °C (110.8 °F) on January 22, 2021 while the lowest recorded temperature was −13.6 °C (7.5 °F).

Climate data for Cipolletti (1901–1990, extremes 1901–present) (Note: The record highs and lows are based on the Secretaria de Mineria link for the period 1901–1990 while records beyond 1990 come from the Oficina de Riesgo Agropecuario link since it only covers from 1970–present. As a result, the most extreme values from either source are used.)
| Month | Jan | Feb | Mar | Apr | May | Jun | Jul | Aug | Sep | Oct | Nov | Dec | Year |
|---|---|---|---|---|---|---|---|---|---|---|---|---|---|
| Record high °C (°F) | 43.8 (110.8) | 42.0 (107.6) | 38.7 (101.7) | 34.1 (93.4) | 29.8 (85.6) | 28.5 (83.3) | 25.8 (78.4) | 31.5 (88.7) | 33.7 (92.7) | 36.7 (98.1) | 40.4 (104.7) | 40.7 (105.3) | 43.8 (110.8) |
| Mean daily maximum °C (°F) | 29.8 (85.6) | 29.0 (84.2) | 25.5 (77.9) | 20.9 (69.6) | 16.0 (60.8) | 12.5 (54.5) | 12.3 (54.1) | 14.9 (58.8) | 18.0 (64.4) | 22.0 (71.6) | 25.9 (78.6) | 28.5 (83.3) | 21.3 (70.3) |
| Daily mean °C (°F) | 21.9 (71.4) | 21.1 (70.0) | 17.7 (63.9) | 13.1 (55.6) | 9.3 (48.7) | 6.2 (43.2) | 6.0 (42.8) | 8.1 (46.6) | 11.3 (52.3) | 15.0 (59.0) | 18.8 (65.8) | 21.2 (70.2) | 14.1 (57.4) |
| Mean daily minimum °C (°F) | 15.4 (59.7) | 14.2 (57.6) | 11.2 (52.2) | 6.9 (44.4) | 4.0 (39.2) | 1.2 (34.2) | 0.9 (33.6) | 2.4 (36.3) | 5.3 (41.5) | 8.5 (47.3) | 11.9 (53.4) | 14.2 (57.6) | 8.0 (46.4) |
| Record low °C (°F) | −0.1 (31.8) | 0.6 (33.1) | −4.5 (23.9) | −7.0 (19.4) | −11.2 (11.8) | −11.3 (11.7) | −13.6 (7.5) | −10.9 (12.4) | −9.1 (15.6) | −4.4 (24.1) | −1.7 (28.9) | −0.7 (30.7) | −13.6 (7.5) |
| Average precipitation mm (inches) | 14.6 (0.57) | 14.4 (0.57) | 25.9 (1.02) | 16.3 (0.64) | 17.5 (0.69) | 16.6 (0.65) | 15.3 (0.60) | 11.7 (0.46) | 16.1 (0.63) | 36.7 (1.44) | 13.2 (0.52) | 15.4 (0.61) | 213.7 (8.41) |
| Average relative humidity (%) | 43.8 | 49.8 | 58.0 | 65.0 | 69.5 | 71.5 | 68.8 | 58.7 | 52.8 | 50.3 | 45.7 | 43.0 | 56.4 |
| Mean monthly sunshine hours | 372 | 279 | 240 | 196 | 148 | 114 | 141 | 172 | 204 | 237 | 273 | 325 | 2,661 |
| Percentage possible sunshine | 75 | 73 | 63 | 59 | 47 | 40 | 47 | 52 | 57 | 58 | 64 | 71 | 60 |
Source 1: Secretaria de Mineria (normals and extremes from 1901–1990)
Source 2: Oficina de Riesgo Agropecuario (record highs and lows), FAO (sun only)
