= List of cities in Río Negro =

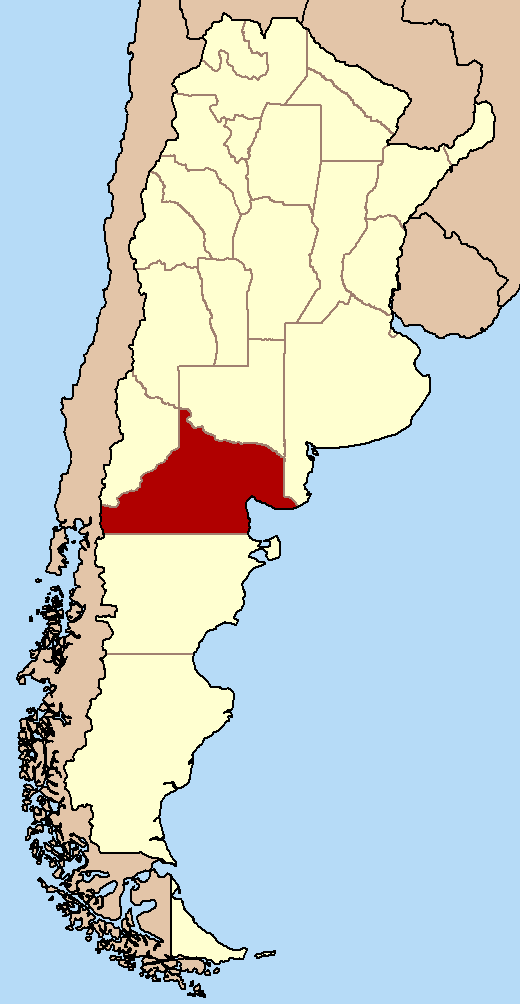
Río Negro Province, situation

List of the most important cities, towns and villages in the Río Negro Province in Argentina, with their municipal population (2001 census [INDEC]).

- Allen (26,083)
- Campo Grande (4,571)
- Colonia Catriel (15,169)
- Cervantes (5,173)
- Chichinales (4,060)
- Chimpay (3,905)
- Choele Choel (10,642)
- Cinco Saltos (19,819)
- Cipolletti (75,078)
- Comallo (1,306)
- Contralmirante Cordero (2,782)
- Coronel Belisle (1,841)
- Darwin (1,052)
- Dina Huapi (2,243)
- El Bolsón, Río Negro (15,537)
- General Conesa (5,595)
- General Fernández Oro (6,813)
- General Roca (78,275)
- Ingeniero Jacobacci (5,785)
- Ingeniero Luis A. Huergo (6,483)
- Lamarque (7,819)
- Los Menucos (2,689)
- Luis Beltrán (6,401)
- Mainqué (2,658)
- Maquinchao (2,195)
- Pilcaniyeu (1,467)
- Pomona (987)
- Río Colorado (13,675)

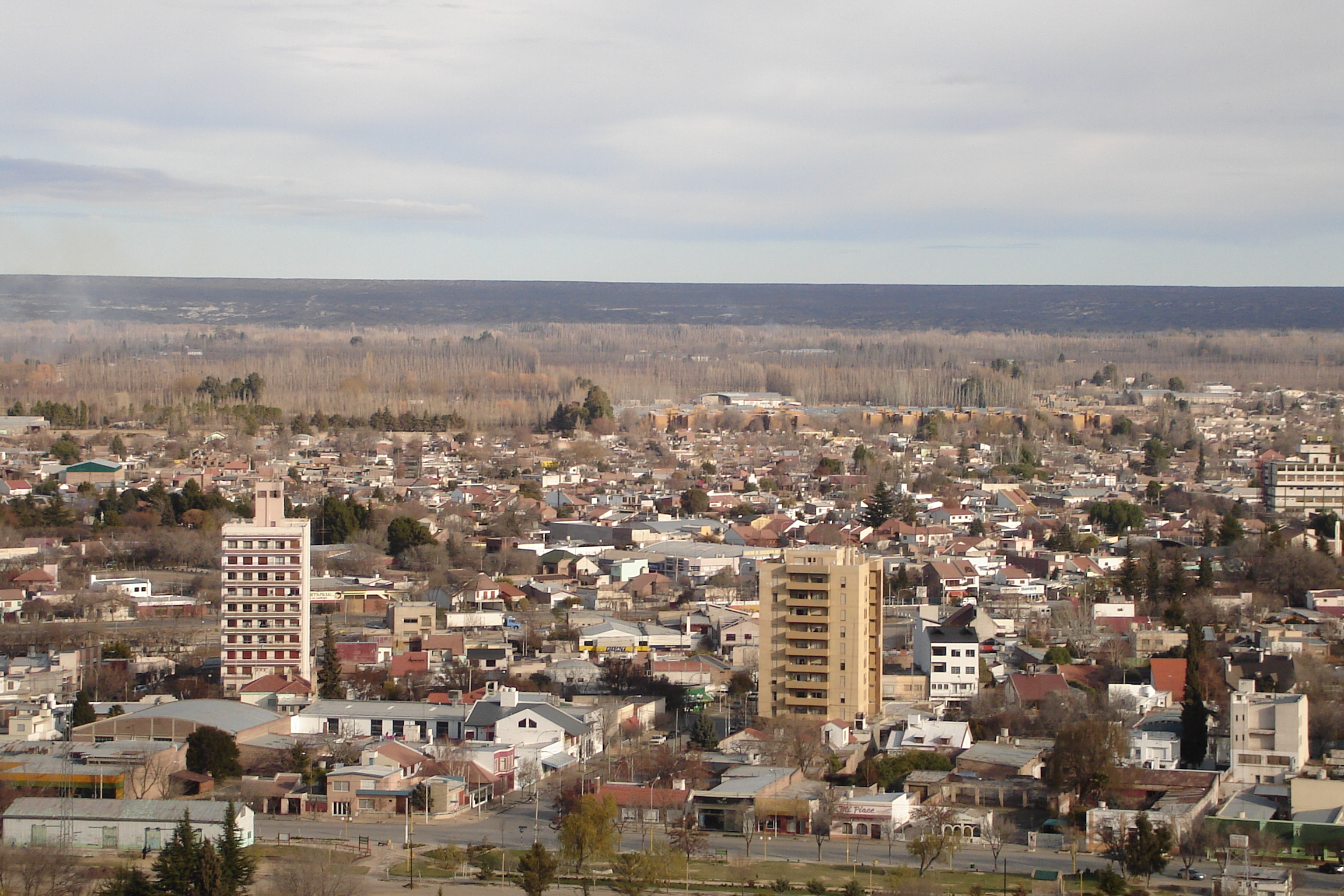
Villa Regina

- San Antonio Oeste (16,966)
  - Las Grutas (approx. 2,500)
- San Carlos de Bariloche (93,101)
- Sierras Coloradas (1,374)
- Sierra Grande (6,978)
- Valcheta (3,596)
- Viedma (47,437)
  - Balneario El Cóndor (approx. 1,300)
- Villa Regina (31,209)
