= Avellaneda Department, Río Negro =

Avellaneda Department
- Department
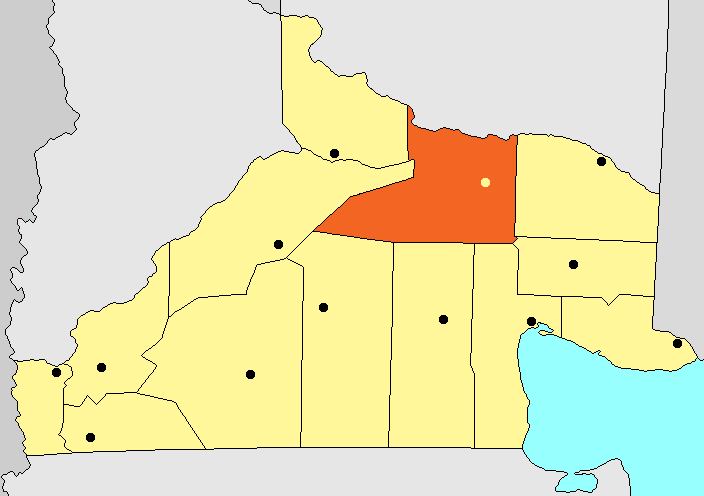
- Location within Río Negro Province

- Location in Argentina
- Coordinates: 39°S 66°W
- Country: Argentina
- Province: Río Negro Province
- Capitol: Choele Choel
- Localities: List: Chelforó; Chimpay; Choele Choel; Coronel Belisle; Darwin; Lamarque; Luis Beltrán; Pomona

Area
  - Total: 20,379 km^{2} (7,868 sq mi)

Population (2022 census [INDEC])
  - Total: 41,352
  - Density: 2.0291/km^{2} (5.2555/sq mi)

Avellaneda is a department of the Río Negro Province, Argentina.

It is crossed by the Negro River forming a fertile valley known as the Valle Medio. The river bifurcates and then both arms join again forming two main islands known as Isla Grande de Choele Choel and Isla Chica de Choele Choel and a few smaller ones. The Isla Grande holds the towns of Luis Beltrán, Lamarque and Pomona, as well as the most fertile area of the department, with cultivations of tomatoes, apples and pears among the most important.

Choele Choel, on the other side of the river from the Isla Grande and at the intersection of Argentine National Route 22 and Provincial Route 250 that crosses the island, is the transport hub of the area with an important long-distance bus terminal, and an airport currently operating only private flights.

Through Darwin, outside the fertile valley, passes the railway that connects Buenos Aires with Bariloche, but the line is currently almost inactive, with occasional cargo-train traffic that doesn't stop at the town.
