= 1994–95 Toluca FC season =

CD Toluca
1994-95 season
- Owner: Grupo Modelo
- President: Jose Fernandez del Cojo
- Manager: Roberto Silva (until 5 December 1994); Aurelio Pascuttini (until 7 January 1995); Moises Figueroa (until 21 January 1995); Luis Garisto
- Stadium: La Bombonera
- Primera Division: 16th
- Copa Mexico: Quarterfinals
- Top goalscorer: Marcelino Bernal (8 goals)
Home colours	Away colours
- All statistics correct as of 27 January 2019.

The 1994–95 CD Toluca season is the 78th campaign in existence and 45th consecutive season in the top flight division of Mexican football.

== Summary ==
In summertime Grupo Modelo reinforced the squad with several transfers in: young Hondurian Striker Carlos Alberto Pavón, Argentine Forward Claudio Spontón, Hugo Guerra, Jesús Alfaro, César Suárez, and Forward Martín Simental. Two decisions affected the club performance: the best player Roberto Depietri left the club after 4 superb campaigns and not renewing the contract for Blas Giunta. Meanwhile, a promising Carlos Pavón scoring goals was cut by the club board due to his matches abroad representing Honduras National Football Team, the same fate followed young talents Sigifredo Mercado and Ricardo Velázquez and the season became "an authentic Hell" for "Diablos".

The chaotic campaign was due to four different managers until Luis Garisto took the job and managing the season on a 16th league spot. The squad suffered 18 lost matches the worst record ever. During mid-season arrived future club legend Forward Jose Cardozo who was injured 8 weeks and scoring his first goal upon March. Owing to the campaign disaster, Grupo Modelo sacked Fernandez del Cojo and appointed Sergio Pelaez Farell as new club president for the next season.

== Squad ==
Note: Flags indicate national team as defined under FIFA eligibility rules; some limited exceptions apply. Players may hold more than one non-FIFA nationality.

No.	Pos.	Nation	Player
—	GK	MEX	Juan Gutierrez
—	DF	MEX	Eugenio Villazón
—	DF	MEX	Marcos Ayala
—	DF	MEX	Arnulfo Tinoco
—	DF	ARG	Horacio Humoller
—	MF	MEX	Cesar Suarez
—	MF	ARG	Blas Giunta
—	MF	MEX	Marcelino Bernal
—	MF	MEX	Jorge Rodriguez
—	FW	MEX	Jose Manuel Abundis
—	FW	PAR	Jose Cardozo

No.	Pos.	Nation	Player
—	GK	MEX	Jesus Alfaro
—	DF	MEX	Alberto Macias
—	DF	MEX	Jaime Jaramillo
—	DF	MEX	Ricardo Velazquez
—	DF	MEX	Salvador Carmona
—	MF	MEX	Hugo Romeo Guerra
—	DF	MEX	Hector Medrano
—	DF	MEX	Jorge Gomez
—	MF	MEX	Sigifredo Mercado
—	MF	MEX	Gilberto Mora
—	DF	MEX	Rodrigo Martinez
—	MF	MEX	Enrique Alfaro
—	FW	MEX	Martin Simental
—	FW	ARG	Claudio Spontón
—	FW	HON	Carlos Pavon

=== Transfers ===
In
Pos.	Name	from	Type
GK	Jesus Alfaro	Correcaminos UAT	
DF	Cesar Suarez	Atlante FC	
FW	Martin Simental	Toros Hidalgo	
FW	Carlos Pavon	Real España	
FW	Claudio Spontón	CA Platense	

Out
Pos.	Name	To	Type
MF	Roberto Depietri	CA Talleres	
FW	Nildeson	Correcaminos UAT	
MF	Apolinar Cortes	Toros Neza	
MF	Rafael Jardon	Atlético Morelia	
MF	Rogelio Romero	Santos Laguna	
MF	Mario Ordiales	Santos Laguna	

==== Winter ====
In
Pos.	Name	from	Type
FW	Jose Cardozo	Olimpia	

Out
Pos.	Name	To	Type
FW	Carlos Pavon	San Luis F.C.	

== Competitions ==
=== La Liga ===
==== League table ====
===== Group 3 =====
Pos	Team	Pld	W	D	L	GF	GA	GD	Pts	Qualification or relegation
1	Guadalajara	36	22	8	6	70	35	+35	52	Playoff
2	UNAM	36	15	11	10	49	36	+13	41	Playoff
3	Puebla	36	12	16	8	45	41	+4	40	Playoff
4	Toluca	36	10	8	18	44	57	−13	28	
5	Tampico Madero-TM Gallos	36	8	7	21	41	74	−33	23	Relegated

===== General table =====
Pos	Team	Pld	W	D	L	GF	GA	GD	Pts
14	Leon	36	11	9	16	39	55	−16	31
15	Morelia	36	9	12	15	54	75	−21	30
16	Toluca	36	10	8	18	44	57	−13	28
17	UAT	36	9	10	17	42	65	−23	28
18	UANL	36	7	10	19	34	50	−16	24

Source: Liga MX
Rules for classification: 1) Points; 2) Goal difference; 3) Number of goals scored; 4) Head-to-head results between tied teams; 5) Number of goals scored away; 6) Highest relegation coefficient; 7) Fair Play points

===== Results by round =====
Round	1	2	3	4	5	6	7	8	9	10	11	12	13	14	15	16	17	18	19	20	21	22	23	24	25	26	27	28	29	30	31	32	33	34	35	36	37	38
Ground	A	H	A	H	A	H	A	H	A	H	A	H	H	A	H	A	H	A	H	H	A	H	A	H	A	H	A	H	A	H	A	A	H	A	H	A	H	A
Result	W	W	L	L	D	W	L	W	W	L	-	D	D	W	D	L	W	D	W	D	L	D	L	D	W	L	W	L	L	-	L	D	D	D	W	W	L	L
Position	3	4	15	7	6	10	11	9	9	11	13	9	9	11	13	15	17	17	17	17	18	17	18	17	13	16	16	17	16	13	14	15	16	17	17	17	17	17

Source: Competitive matches
A = Away; H = Home; W = Win; D = Draw; L = Loss; P = Postponed; = Leader, Qualification for the quarter-finals; C = Qualification for the quarter-finals as group leader.; E = Qualification for the quarter-finals as group runner-up.; R = Qualification for the Repechaje.

==== Matches ====
4 September 1994 1	Toluca	3-0	Tampico Madero	Toluca
	Bernal 49'; Pavon 71'; Ayala 75'			Stadium: La Bombonera

9 September 1994 2	Necaxa	1-0	Toluca	Tlalpan
	José María Higareda 44'			Stadium: Azteca

18 September 1994 3	Puebla FC	1-0	Toluca	Puebla de los Angeles
	Salvador Luis Reyes 50'			Stadium: Cuauhtemoc

25 September 1994 4	Toluca	2-0	CF Monterrey	Toluca
	Bernal 9' (pen.); Claudio Sppontón 82'			Stadium: La Bombonera

2 October 1994 5	Leon	2-2	Toluca	Leon de los Aldama
	Valdez 39' (pen.); Dezotti 50'		16' Bernal; 77' Claudio Sppontón	Stadium: Nou Camp

9 October 1994 6	Toluca	1-2	Atlas FC	Toluca
	Pavon 87'		49' Domizzi; 56' Borgetti	Stadium: La Bombonera

14 October 1994 7	Tecos UAG	1-1	Toluca	Zapopan
	Gallaga 71'		41' Pavon	Stadium: 3 de Marzo

23 October 1994 8	Toluca	4-2	Santos Laguna	Toluca
	Tinoco 39'; Pavon 50', 65', 85'		69' Galindo; 73' Asprilla	Stadium: La Bombonera

29 October 1994 9	Cruz Azul	2-0	Toluca	Tlalpan
	Marcelo Delgado 13'; Juan Reynoso 60'			Stadium: Azteca

6 November 1994 10	Toluca	1-2	Atlético Morelia	Toluca
	Marcelino Bernal 88'		43' Marco Antonio Figueroa; 66' Arturo Reyna	Stadium: La Bombonera

6 November 1994 11	Atlante FC	0-0	Toluca	Benito Juarez
				Stadium: Azulgrana

19 November 1994 12	Toluca	4-2	Correcaminos UAT	Toluca
	Daniel Corral 9' (o.g.); Pavon 68'; Bernal 73'; Mora 86'		35' Sergio Almaguer; 61' Nildeson Silva	Stadium: La Bombonera

26 November 1994 13	Tigres UANL	1-1	Toluca	San Nicolas de los Garza
	Santos 49'		33' Mercado	Stadium: Universitario

30 November 1994 14	Toluca	0-1	Toros Neza	Toluca
			35'Mauricio Rojano	Stadium: La Bombonera

4 December 1994 15	Guadalajara	2-0	Toluca	Guadalajara
	Daniel Guzmán 3', 31'			Stadium: Jalisco

11 December 1994 16	Toluca	bye	Leones Negros UdeG	Toluca
				Stadium: La Bombonera

17 December 1994 17	CD Veracruz	1-0	Toluca	Veracruz
	Leonel Bolsonello 70'			Stadium: Pirata Fuente

23 December 1994 18	CD Toluca	0-3	América	Toluca
			29', 83' Francois Omam Biyik; 63' Luis Roberto Alves "Zague"	Stadium: La Bombonera

29 December 1994 19	Pumas UNAM	0-0	Toluca	Tlalpan
				Stadium: Olimpico Universitario

20	TM Gallos Blancos	2-0	Toluca	Queretaro
	Héctor del Ángel 27'; René Mendieta 47'			Stadium: Corregidora

21	Toluca	1-2	Necaxa	Toluca
	Alberto Macías 17'		52' Ricardo Peláez; 79' Ivo Basay	Stadium: La Bombonera

22	Toluca	2-0	Puebla FC	Toluca
	Marcelino Bernal 8'; Jorge Rodríguez 12'			Stadium: La Bombonera

23	CF Monterrey	3-0	Toluca	Monterrey
	Sergio Verdirame 2' (pen.), 40'; Fabián Guevara 17'			Stadium: Tecnológico

24	Toluca	1-0	Leon	Toluca
	Jorge Rodríguez 55'			Stadium: La Bombonera

25	Atlas FC	2-3	Toluca	Guadalajara
	Eduardo Berizzo 10'; Jared Borguetti 30'		2', 77' José Manuel Abundis; 88' Enrique Alfaro	Stadium: Jalisco

19 February 1995 26	CD Toluca	1-2	Tecos UA.G.	Toluca
	Enrique Alfaro 78'		Hugo Aparecido 34'; Mauricio Gallaga 41'	Stadium: La Bombonera

27	Santos Laguna	2-2	Toluca
	Pedro Muñoz 54'; Miguel Asprilla 82		José Manuel Abundis 29, Marcelino Bernal 78

5 March 1995 28	Toluca	0-4	Cruz Azul	Toluca
			32' Hermosillo; 41' Zamora; 57' José Luis Sixtos; 77' Pedro Duana	Stadium: La Bombonera

12 March 1995 29	Atlético Morelia	1-2	Toluca	Morelia
	Luis Hernán Pérez 37'		50' Abundis; 88' Cardozo	Stadium: Morelos

19 March 1995 30	Toluca	4-2	Atlante FC	Toluca
	Cardozo 31'; Jaime Jaramillo 61'; Eugenio Villazón 67'; Rodriguez 69'		45', 77' (pen.) Romano	Stadium: La Bombonera

26 March 1995 31	Correcaminos UAT	2-2	Toluca	Ciudad Victoria
	César Ovando 27' (pen.); Daniel Corral 70'		32', 48' Jaime Jaramillo	Stadium: Marte R. Gomez

2 April 1995 32	Toluca	1-3	Tigres UANL	Toluca
	Eugenio Villazón 63'		9' Lozano; 53', 55' Daniel Deeke	Stadium: La Bombonera

5 April 1995 33	Toros Neza	3-1	Toluca	Ciudad Nezahualcoyotl
	Mohamed 39'; Montes de Oca 44' (pen.); Vilallonga 47'		63' César Suárez	Stadium: Neza 86

9 April 1995 34	Toluca	1-2	CD Guadalajara	Toluca
	Bernal 85'		4' Guzmán; 40' Manuel Martínez	Stadium: La Bombonera

23 April 1995 36	Toluca	1-2	Veracruz	Toluca
	Cardozo 59'		64' Bolsonello; 67' Malibrán	Stadium: La Bombonera

29 April 1995 37	America	1-1	Toluca	Tlalpan
	Blanco 19'		59' Abundis	Stadium: Azteca

7 May 1995 38	Toluca	2-1	Pumas UNAM	Toluca
	Abundis 2'; Mora 29'		89' Braulio Luna	Stadium: La Bombonera

== Statistics ==
=== Goalscorers ===
8. Marcelino Bernal
