= Pomona, Río Negro =

Pomona
- Interactive map of Pomona
- Coordinates: 39°28′S 65°30′W
- Country: Argentina
- Province: Río Negro
- Established: September 30, 1933

Government
  - Intendant: Miguel Angel Jara
- Elevation: 126 m (413 ft)

Population (2010 census [INDEC])
  - Total: 1,500 (2,017)
- Time zone: UTC−3 (ART)
- CPA Base: R8367 (ex 8363)
- Climate: BSk

Pomona is a small village on the Choele Choel Island in the Avellaneda Department in the Río Negro Province, in Argentina. It was already a crossing point for the Negro River to the island in 1890, when it was known as Paso Peñalva, on the way to Choele Choel. It was formally founded in 1933 and named after the goddess Pomona, because of its gardens.

Provincial Primary School #7 is located there, containing an agrotechnic school and a municipal library. In the Pomona area, there are farms that cultivate mainly pears and apples, but also peaches and trees for wood. Its closest city is Lamarque, to which is connected by the National Route 250.
