= Ceferino Namuncurá =

Argentine religious student

Blessed Ceferino Namuncurá
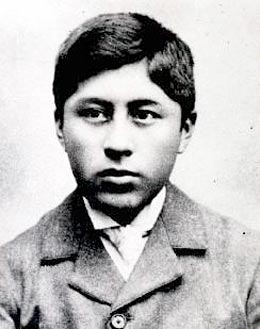

Blessed
- Born: August 26, 1886; Chimpay, Río Negro Province, Argentina
- Died: May 11, 1905 (aged 18); Rome, Italy
- Venerated in: Roman Catholicism
- Beatified: November 11, 2007, Chimpay, Río Negro Province, Argentina by Pope Benedict XVI
- Feast: August 26

Ceferino Namuncurá (August 26, 1886 – May 11, 1905) was a religious student. He was beatified in 2007.

== Early life ==
He was born at Chimpay, a small town in Valle Medio, Río Negro Province, Argentina, the sixth child of Rosario Burgos and a Mapuche cacique, Manuel Namuncurá. At the age of eight, he was baptized by a Salesian missionary priest, Domingo Milanesio. Namuncurá's early years were spent by the Río Negro river, and it was here that he, according to legend, miraculously survived a fall into the river.

His father Manuel, Chief of the Mapuches, promoted to honorary colonel in the Argentine army, decided that his son would study in Buenos Aires to prepare himself "to be useful to his people." Thanks to the friendship of Manuel with General Luís María Campos, Minister of War and the Navy of Argentina, the boy came to study in the National Workshops of the Navy as a carpenter's apprentice. There he would remain for three months. Being the only native Indian in the school, Ceferino was mistreated by the other students, and he soon fell ill. He wrote to his father that he was not happy in that place, and Manuel then asked former Argentine president Luis Sáenz Peña's advice. He recommended to Colonel Manuel Namuncurá that he send the boy to the Salesians of Don Bosco.

== Education ==
On September 20, 1897, Ceferino went to study with the Salesians at the Colegio Pío IX, a technical academy in Almagro, Buenos Aires. There, he showed himself to be an excellent student and choral musician. He enjoyed his studies and sports and performed card tricks for his classmates, and taught them archery. From April 2, 1901, Carlos Gardel, afterward a legendary tango singer and film actor, became a student at the academy and sang along with Ceferino in the chorus.

Manuel, his father, wanted him back home to serve as interpreter and secretary when he finished his studies. However, Ceferino was already enthusiastic about becoming a Salesian priest.

== In Italy ==
Although his health was already generally frail, Ceferino began studying for the priesthood. In 1904, he departed for Italy accompanying Mgr. Giovanni Cagliero, a former disciple of Don Bosco who was to become an Archbishop. Pope Pius X received them in September, after which Namuncurá moved to Turin and later to the Salesian College "Villa Sora" in Frascati, to continue his education. He became increasingly ill during the Italian winter. He was taken to Rome, where he finally succumbed to pulmonary tuberculosis on May 11, 1905, at the Fate bene fratelli hospital.

== Back to Argentina ==
In 1924 his remains were returned to Argentina and placed in the chapel at Fortín Mercedes, in the southern part of Buenos Aires Province. In 1945, a request for his beatification was presented to the Holy See. Between May 13 and July 10, 1947, the church officially started the process for Canonization of Ceferino Namuncurá, with 21 then-living witnesses giving testimony in evidence of his virtues. Theologians approved his spiritual writings on 10 June 1949.

At his birthplace of Chimpay, a small chapel was erected, where believers from Río Negro Province and beyond began to pray for his intercession.

On June 22, 1972, Pope Paul VI promulgated the Decree of Heroism of his virtues, and Ceferino was thus proclaimed venerable, becoming the first Catholic Argentine to receive that title and the first South American aborigine.

The devotion to Ceferino Namuncurá, the saintly young Mapuche, known popularly as The Lily of Patagonia ("El lirio de la Patagonia") became widespread in Buenos Aires and throughout Argentina. In particular, the indigenous people recognize him as one of their own. The affection of the people of Argentina for this selfless young man is quite touchingly sincere, and images and representations of his face are myriad. In 1991 his relics were translated from the small sanctuary chapel to the more spacious Sanctuary of Mary, Help of Christians, in the same town of Fortín Mercedes.

== Beatification ==
In 2000 a committee of Vatican pathologists declared that the healing of the uterine cancer of a young mother, Valeria Herrera from Córdoba, Argentina, could not be explained medically. Consequently the church authorities decreed that the healing was a miracle due to the intercession of Ceferino Namuncurá. This opened the way for Ceferino's beatification.

On July 6, 2007 Pope Benedict XVI decreed that the beatification should proceed. The beatification ceremony took place in Chimpay, Argentina, on November 11, 2007. It was one of the first few beatification ceremonies held outside the Vatican and in the blessed's land; it was the first beatification of a native South American. The solemn liturgy was presided over by Cardinal Tarcisio Bertone, papal Secretary of State and himself a Salesian of Don Bosco. More than ten thousand faithful participated, with an active role played by Mapuche delegations.

Ceferino's liturgical memorial is assigned to August 26.

== Legacy ==
Manuel Gálvez, the Argentine novelist and biographer, wrote a biography of Ceferino Namuncurá in 1947: El Santito de la Toldería. La vida perfecta de Ceferino Namuncurá. Ceferino Namuncura Park, along the Negro River, in Chimpay, is named in his honor.

In Cebu, Philippines, students of Don Bosco Technology Center staged a play entitled Zephyrin: The Musicale on March 14, 15, and 16, 2008, at SM Cinema One in Cebu City, Philippines, written by Jude Gitamondoc and directed by Daisy Brilliantes Ba-ad with the help of Don Bosco Technology Center Productions. The musical was a Salesian Production made in honor of the beatification of Ceferino. The musical featured amateur actors, mostly from high school and elementary. The story begins when Ceferino is only a child and ends after his death. The play was rerun on Nov. 10-12 at SM Seaside City Cebu's Centerstage.

== See also ==
- Religion in Argentina
