= National University of Río Negro =

- Universidad Nacional de Río Negro
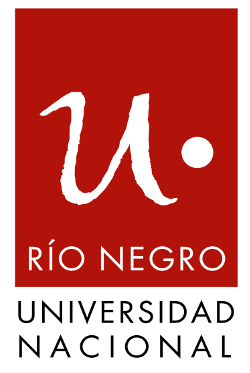
- Type: Public
- Established: 2007
- Chancellor: Juan Carlos del Bello
- Students: 2,303
- Location: Viedma, Río Negro Province, Argentina; 39.09543°S 67.09478°W
- Campus: multiple campuses
- Website: http://www.unrn.edu.ar/

The National University of Río Negro (Spanish: Universidad Nacional de Río Negro) is a public institution of higher learning located in Río Negro Province, Argentina, and established in 2007 as part of a plan to geographically diversify Argentina's National University system.

The university maintains campuses throughout Río Negro Province, one of Argentina's most-sparsely populated: Bariloche, Choele Choel, El Bolsón, General Roca, San Antonio Oeste, Viedma, and Villa Regina. The school offers 25 undergraduate courses and one post-graduate.

== See also ==
- Argentine Universities
