= Indio Comahue Monument =

Monument in Villa Regina, Argentina

Monument to the Comahue Indian
- Monumento al Indio Comahue
- Interactive map of Monument to the Comahue Indian
- Location: Villa Regina, Río Negro, Argentina
- Coordinates: 39°5′27.64″S 67°4′40.11″W
- Designer: Miguel de Lisi
- Material: Reinforced concrete, ceramic brick, iron
- Height: 12.92 metres (42.4 ft)
- Beginning date: July 1964
- Completion date: September 1964
- Opening date: November 7, 1964
- Dedicated to: Native inhabitants of the Comahue

The Monumento al Indio Comahue (Monument to the Comahue Indian) is a monument located in Villa Regina, in the Argentine province of Río Negro. It was constructed to honor the native inhabitants of the Comahue Region. The monument was completed in time for the inaugural Comahue National Fair in 1964.

Commissioned by the organizers of the fair, Bartolo Pasin and Rogelio Chimenti, it was designed by Miguel De Lisi and constructed in two months by local bricklayer Aldo Cardozo. Presently it is used as an overlook for its panoramic view. The monument is considered to be a symbol of the town, and as such it is depicted in the coat of arms.

== History ==
The monument was erected to commemorate the native inhabitants of Comahue. It was constructed for the first Comahue National Fair, in 1964. This was a 45-day event that aimed to highlight the economic potential of the Comahue Region, and at the same time commemorate the 40th anniversary of the founding of Villa Regina. Bartolo Pasin and Rogelio Chimenti, who organized the fair, proposed the construction to designer Miguel De Lisi, after seeing his work at the City Hotel in Mar del Plata.

=== Construction ===
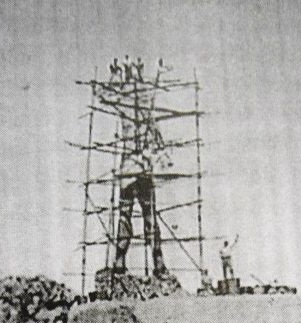
Construction of the Indio Comahue in 1964

De Lisi sent the drawings to the local construction team, led by Aldo Humberto Cardozo and Alberto Sartor. The monument had been originally planned to be 10 metres (33 ft) tall, but Cardozo re-scaled it to be nearly 11 metres (36 ft), and later also added a high base of 2 metres (6 ft 7 in). The completed monument, now standing at almost 13 metres (42.4 ft), depicts a native who is holding a long spear while watching the horizon.

Work started in July 1964, with the structure being built of reinforced concrete. It had an iron skeleton made up of 4 inch pipes (100mm), which was reinforced with radial sections that were soldered every 50 centimetres (20 in). Later, the figure was filled from the feet to the hips with ceramic brick and concrete, with the top half finished using a layer of reinforced concrete. The monument was completed in two months with an estimated weight of 80 tons, and a height of 12.90 metres (42.3 ft). In its construction, five hundred bags of cement, 2,500 kilograms (5,500 lb) of iron, 60 metres (200 ft) of steel, and 80 square metres (860 sq ft) of sand were used.

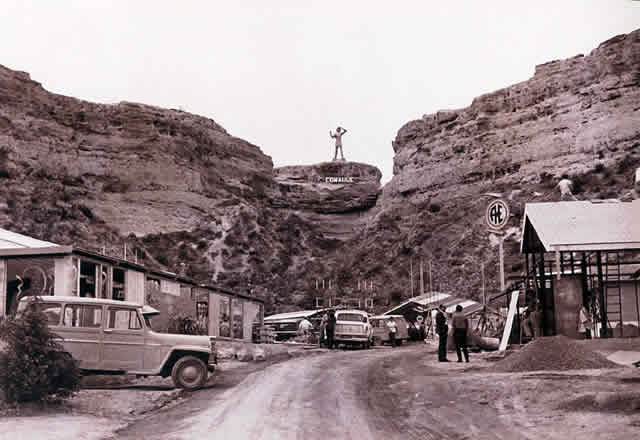
View of the finished monument from main street Villa Regina, during the preparations for the Comahue National Fair, 1964

It was later painted by a local man, Carlos Basabe Cerdá. The job proved to be very difficult due to strong winds that blew the wooden planks off the scaffolding and into a nearby ditch. A construction team later tied on the planks, solving the problem. The painters first applied a primer coat, then linseed oil, varnish, and finally a coat of copper glitter. The monument was inaugurated during the opening of the Comahue National Fair on September 7, 1964.

== The monument and Villa Regina ==
The structure is located on the northern hill of the town, which has an elevation of 70 to 80 metres (230 to 260 feet). The hill is mostly covered in bushes and can be accessed by two paths. Currently it is used as an overlook for its panoramic view of the town. It also serves to mark the finishing line for the annual trekking trail competition, Desafío al Indio Comahue.

Considered as the symbol of Villa Regina, the Indio Comahue is depicted in the city's coat of arms. It was also depicted in the previous seal of the Río Negro Province, designed by the government of the Argentine Revolution. The seal was replaced in 2009 by the one that the overthrown government designed in 1966, months before the coup d'état. The Comahue National Fair was relaunched in 2004, and is currently celebrated every two years.

On October 23, 2018, the Rio Negro provincial legislature passed law 5320 that declared the Indio Comahue a historical monument in accordance to the law 3656 for "Protection and Conservation of the Cultural Patrimony of the Río Negro Province". Meanwhile, two propositions were presented at the Argentine Senate to declare it a National Historical Monument in 2016 and 2018 respectively. In 2019, plots of land on the northern hill that included the location of the monument were subject to a lawsuit by lawyers that requested the municipality to auction them off for the settlement of unpaid fees. The dispute resulted from a previous lawsuit that granted an architect the rights to develop a housing project. To avoid danger to the monument, Municipal prosecutor Juan Carlos Giménez presented the judge the existing protection declaration by the Villa Regina municipal council, the Río Negro Province and the existing projects at the Argentine Senate.
