= General Enrique Godoy =

Coordinates: 39°05′S 67°09′W

- Municipality and village
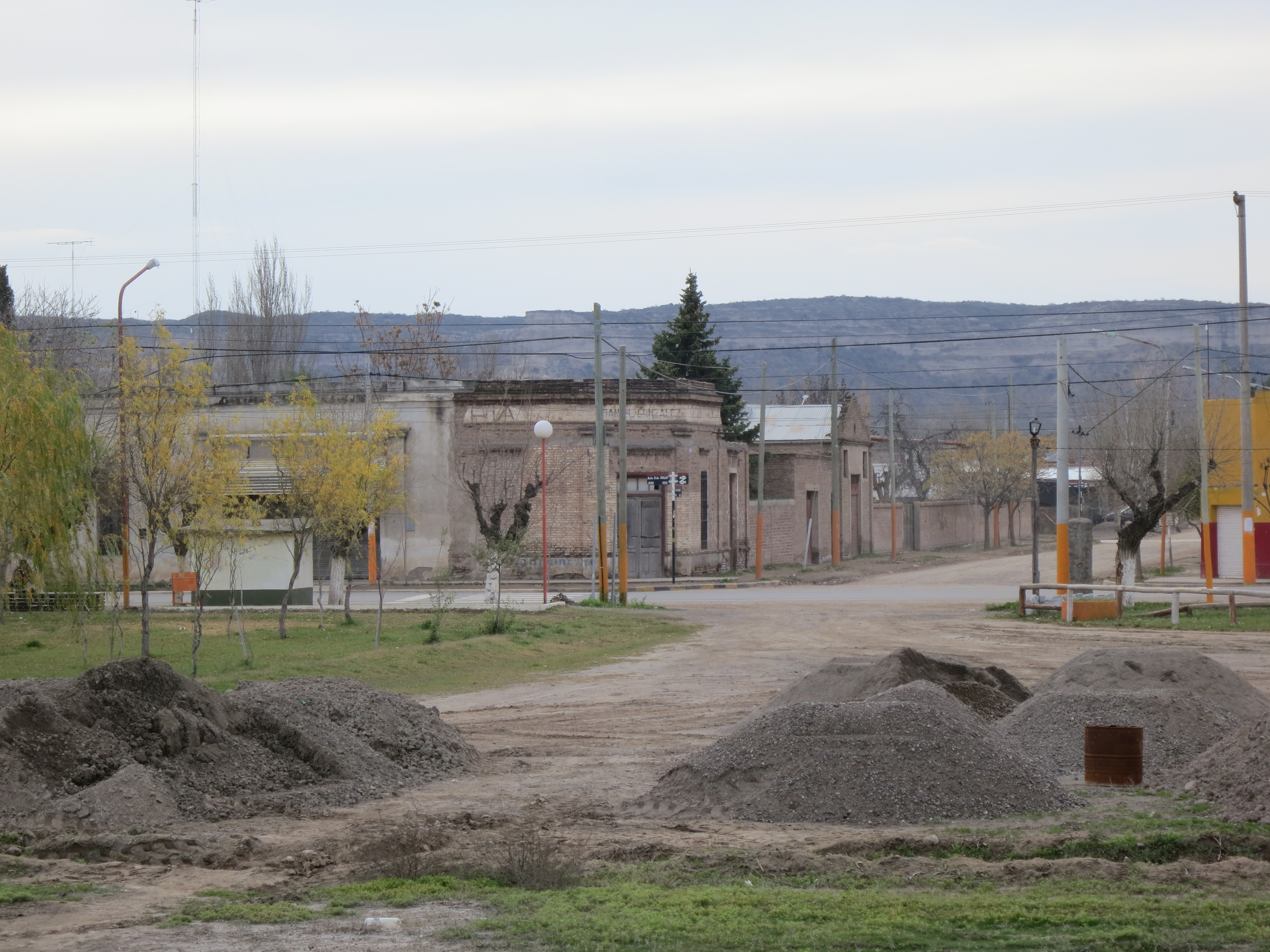
- Interactive map of General Enrique Godoy
- Country: Argentina
- Province: Río Negro Province
- Time zone: UTC−3 (ART)
- Climate: BWk

General Enrique Godoy is a village and municipality in the General Roca Department of the Río Negro Province in Argentina. It is situated in the Upper Valley (Alto Valle) region, known for its fruit production.

== History ==
After the Conquest of the Desert, president Julio Argentino Roca gave his secretary, Manuel Marcos Zorilla, 15,000 hectares of the area that included the present General Enrique Godoy and Villa Regina, which he called "Campo Zorilla" (Zorrilla Field, or fox field). Part of the property was acquired by Spanish physician Avelino Gutiérrez and his mathematician son-in-law Julio Rey Pastor in 1920 for urban development. The train station was opened in 1924 and the town was named after an expeditioner of the Desert conquest.

== Economy ==
The local economy is heavily centered on irrigated agriculture, specifically the cultivation of apples and pears. The town serves as a service hub for the surrounding rural farms (chacras).

== Climate ==
Climate data for General Enrique Godoy, Argentina (1941–1960)
Month	Jan	Feb	Mar	Apr	May	Jun	Jul	Aug	Sep	Oct	Nov	Dec	Year
Record high °C (°F)	41.4 (106.5)	39.6 (103.3)	36.0 (96.8)	33.0 (91.4)	28.0 (82.4)	22.2 (72.0)	24.3 (75.7)	28.9 (84.0)	31.5 (88.7)	36.0 (96.8)	39.2 (102.6)	40.0 (104.0)	41.4 (106.5)
Mean daily maximum °C (°F)	31.5 (88.7)	29.8 (85.6)	26.9 (80.4)	21.7 (71.1)	16.8 (62.2)	12.9 (55.2)	13.4 (56.1)	16.4 (61.5)	19.6 (67.3)	23.9 (75.0)	27.9 (82.2)	30.4 (86.7)	22.6 (72.7)
Daily mean °C (°F)	22.1 (71.8)	20.7 (69.3)	17.6 (63.7)	13.0 (55.4)	9.6 (49.3)	6.1 (43.0)	6.1 (43.0)	8.0 (46.4)	11.3 (52.3)	15.5 (59.9)	19.3 (66.7)	21.9 (71.4)	14.2 (57.6)
Mean daily minimum °C (°F)	13.9 (57.0)	12.3 (54.1)	9.5 (49.1)	5.8 (42.4)	3.4 (38.1)	0.7 (33.3)	0.0 (32.0)	1.1 (34.0)	3.8 (38.8)	7.3 (45.1)	10.6 (51.1)	13.2 (55.8)	6.8 (44.2)
Record low °C (°F)	4.0 (39.2)	2.2 (36.0)	−3.0 (26.6)	−4.9 (23.2)	−6.5 (20.3)	−10.1 (13.8)	−11.4 (11.5)	−11.7 (10.9)	−7.1 (19.2)	−3.7 (25.3)	0.2 (32.4)	−0.8 (30.6)	−11.7 (10.9)
Average precipitation mm (inches)	18.6 (0.73)	10.3 (0.41)	15.6 (0.61)	18.0 (0.71)	17.5 (0.69)	15.0 (0.59)	13.5 (0.53)	7.9 (0.31)	14.0 (0.55)	15.8 (0.62)	17.6 (0.69)	19.7 (0.78)	183.5 (7.22)
Average relative humidity (%)	42.5	49.5	56.5	63.0	67.5	71.0	66.5	62.0	47.0	47.5	43.0	41.5	54.7
Source: Secretaria de Mineria
