= Villa Regina =

- City
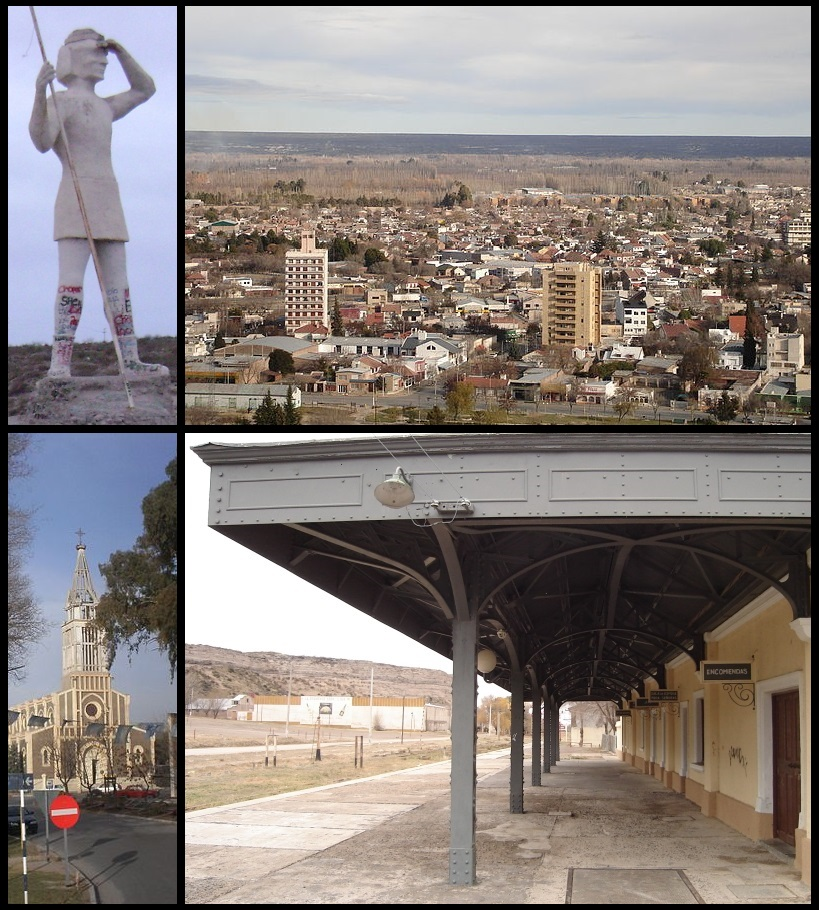
- Clockwise from top: Indio Comahue Monument, Downtown Villa Regina, train station and Nuestra Señora del Rosario parish

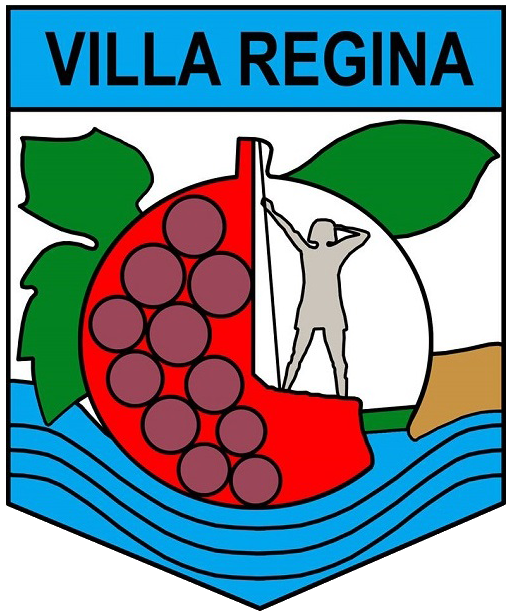
- Coat of arms
- Nickname: La Perla del Valle (The Pearl of the Valley)
- Location within Río Negro Province Location within Argentina
- Coordinates: 39°06′S 67°04′W
- Country: Argentina
- Province: (Río Negro Province) Río Negro
- Established: November 7, 1924

Government
  - Intendente: Luis Albrieu
- Elevation: 184 m (604 ft)

Population (2010)
  - Total: 33,089
- (INDEC census)
- Time zone: UTC−3 (ART)
- CPA Base: R8336
- Climate: BSk
- Website: web.archive.org/web/20090425135521/http://www.villaregina.gov.ar:80/

Villa Regina is a city in the General Roca Department of the province of Río Negro, Argentina. The city is connected to the rest of the towns in the Upper Río Negro Valley via National Route 22.

The city was built by the Italian-Argentine Colonization Company (Spanish: Compañía Italo-Argentina de Colonización), which purchased 5,000 hectares for urban development from the estate of Manuel Zorrilla. The lands were divided into four zones of 1,300 hectares, 1,200 hectares, 1,300 hectares, and 1,200 hectares. These zones were then subdivided into lots, which were sold to families that immigrated to Argentina from Italy. The settlement was established on November 7, 1924. It was originally named Colonia Regina de Alvear, after the wife of then-president Marcelo T. de Alvear, who had approved the project. The company developed the town with the help of Italian investors. In 1930, the government of Rio Negro created the municipality of Villa Regina, dissolving the Italian-Argentine Colonization Company. By 1939, the development of the four zones was completed. In 1987 the town wrote its first constitution, doing away with the position of municipal president and replacing it with the position of mayor.

Villa Regina is considered the capital of the Eastern Upper Valley micro-region. The surrounding area produces a large portion of the apple and pear harvests of Patagonia and also has a sizable grape harvest. The economy of the town is complemented by its canning and bottling plants, which compose the local industrial park. The city celebrates the Provincial Grape Harvest Festival annually and also hosts the National Comahue Fair biennially.

== History ==
=== Campo Zorrilla ===
The first known mention of the area was an entry in the diary of Colonel Manuel José Olascoaga, an officer in the Argentine army. On June 4, 1879, during the Conquest of the Desert, Olascoaga described it while camping with his troops: "Two hours on the way up from Chichinal, we camped on a place a bit far from the river, close to a water reservoir. [...] The ground is plain with ligere landforms. The canyons to the north increase their altitude westbound." During the expansion of the Buenos Aires Great Southern Railway (Spanish: Ferrocarril del Sur) to the lands conquered during the Desert Campaign, the new route passed by the area because it was flat. Manuel Marcos Zorilla, the private secretary of president Julio Argentino Roca, was given 15,000 hectares there, which he called Zorilla Field (Spanish: Campo Zorilla). Zorrilla officially received the lands in 1895, with the condition that he would have to cede, free of charge, the sections where the tracks of the Ferrocarril del Sur would be built.

In 1898 engineer César Cipolletti was hired by the Argentine government to analyze the Neuquén, Limay, Negro and Colorado rivers, to construct reservoirs to prevent floods, and to study the feasibility of building irrigation systems. Cipolletti concluded that the construction of irrigation channels from the rivers would turn the arid lands that surrounded the Upper Valley of the Negro river into cultivable land. Cipolletti started the construction of the channels in 1907. To attract Italian investors, he shared his ideas that same year at the Pontifical Gregorian University in Rome, but he died in 1908 while returning to Argentina. In 1923, Felipe Bonoli, an engineer who had accompanied him during the construction of the channels, purchased 5,000 hectares of land from the estate of Manuel Zorrilla on behalf of the Italian-Argentine Colonization Company (Spanish: Compañía Italo-Argentina de Colonización); he then dedicated this land to urban development. The next year, President Marcelo T. de Alvear approved the purchase and colonization of the area. The purchased land received irrigation from a branch of the main channel of the Nequén levee and was near Chichinales and the station Km. 1120 of the Ferrocarril del Sur.

=== Colonia Regina de Alvear ===
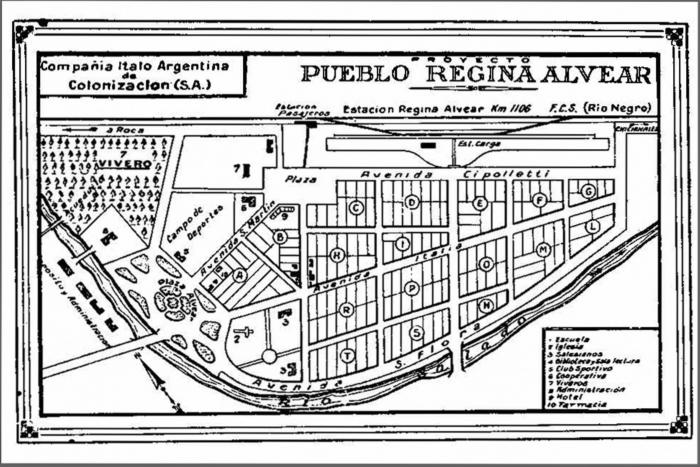
First map of the city, published by the Colonization Company

The colony was established on November 7, 1924, and was initially named Colonia Regina de Alvear, in honor of the first lady, Regina Pacini de Alvear. Héctor Valsecchi was named the first president of the company. Bonoli and his helper, Emilio Bignami, planned the organization and development of the area. The company spent most of its starting capital of US$1.4 million buying the 5,000 hectares. During the first year, they worked 1,300 hectares, which were divided into lots of 5, 10 and 15 hectares. To settle this area, the company gave preference to the Italian immigrants that already lived in Argentina. During the second stage, the company cultivated 1,200 hectares; these were given to Italian families that wanted to immigrate to Argentina. Those in this second wave of settlement were selected by the officials of the company. By 1927, 1,000 people had settled in the town. Soon a hospital, a church, a school, a library and a sports club were built. The Bank of Rome gave the settlement a loan of 5 million lire, in spite of Benito Mussolini's plan to use that money to support Italian workers in Italy. Further loans to the settlement were leveraged by Bonoli's connection to Ottavio Dinale. Dinale, a collaborator of Mussolini, had influence with the General Commissariat of Emigration (Italian: Commissariato Generale dell'Emigrazione). The loans were given by the Banca Commerciale Italiana, through the Francés y Italiano para América del Sur bank and the Italia y Río de la Plata bank.

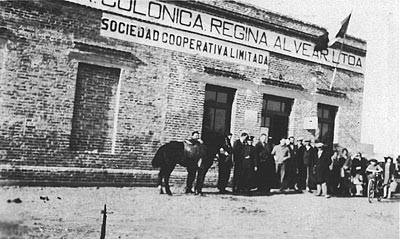
The Colonia Regina cooperative

Most of the settlers were from northern Italy, particularly from the Friuli-Venezia Giulia region. Part of the population included Slovenians who were escaping from persecution in Fascist Italy, as well as Poles and Czechoslovaks who were admitted after Italy introduced a new policy that restricted their immigration to Italy from Poland and Czechoslovakia, respectively. The inhabitants initially paid a 10% deposit of the total value of the land they received, which was delivered fenced and ploughed. The extensions included a house with a porch, bathroom and well. The houses built on the 10 and 15 hectare extensions came with four bedrooms, while the ones built on the 5 hectare lots had two. The development plan of the Colonization Company encouraged crop diversification and promoted the cultivation of alfalfa, vineyards, pear trees, and apple trees. In 1925, the settlers worked every Sunday for a month to build a 1.5 km (0.93 mi) path; they later built a church and a graveyard at the end of it. The next year, the train station of Villa Regina was inaugurated.

In 1927, the governor of Río Negro, León Quaglia, wrote a letter to Bonoli, requesting the creation of a government-directed development committee for the colony. Bonoli opposed the government's decision to intervene in the administration of the lands, pointing out the progress that the company had already made with the urban development, and stated that if a committee was formed the company could "consider its mission accomplished" and that the current settlers could suffer a "lamentable delay" in the construction of the projected developments. He requested that the governor halt the creation of the committee for a year. After president Alvear had rejected the company's plan to annex the ethnic enclave to Italy and had reminded the settlers that their land ultimately belonged to Argentina, the town was renamed Colonia Regina, removing "de Alvear". By 1928, the 5,000 hectares had been developed, including the addition of 1,200 new hectares that belonged to the former Zorrilla estancia. The area was subdivided into four zones, and a cooperative financed by the bank loans was created. The cooperative distributed food and provided the settlers with seeds, plants and tools to work their lands.

=== Becoming a municipality ===
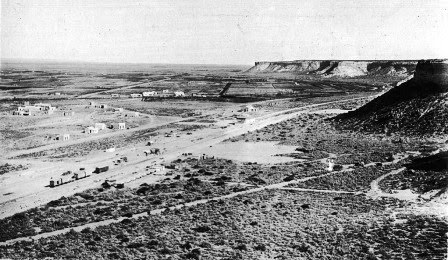
Colonia Regina in 1927

In December 1930, the government of Río Negro created the municipality of Villa Regina, dissolving the Italian-Argentine Colonization Company. During that same decade, the government-directed development committee was mostly composed of former employees of the company. By 1939, the development of the four zones was completed. Primary and secondary irrigation channels were built and were complemented by the construction of acequias, which are community-operated watercourses. The irrigation made the arid lands fertile, increasing the amount of land that could be cultivated.

The town remained distant from national politics until the Rio Negro National Territory became a province, causing the population to focus on European politics. The town was divided between the supporters of the Italian fascist regime and the supporters of the Italian socialists. During the Second Italo-Ethiopian War, 80% of the Italian population donated their gold to help the Italian war effort, while 20 settlers of the town departed to fight for Italy in the conflict. In 1937, an independent neo-fascist organization whose influence covered the Upper Río Negro valley area, called the Patagonic Nationalist Youth (Spanish: Juventud Nacionalista Patagónica) appeared in Villa Regina. The Patagonic Youth was mostly composed of descendants of the fascist enthusiasts that were part of the former Colonization Company. The organization aimed to support Argentine nationalism and gained a sizable membership because of its aversion toward the United Kingdom; this aversion was the reason most of Villa Regina supported the Axis powers during World War II. Relations between Argentina and the United Kingdom (UK) had been tense ever since the UK had seized the Falkland Islands (Spanish: Islas Malvinas) in 1833, causing most Argentines to sympathize with the UK's enemies, the Axis powers. Meanwhile, the Patagonic Youth were opposed by the Democráticos, who represented a major part of the population of Villa Regina, and by Acción Argentina, an organization favorable to the Allied Forces. After rival public demonstrations between the Patagonic Youth and Acción Argentina ended in riots in 1943 and 1944, triggering police repression, they were dismantled. The remaining members of these two groups founded other political parties that ultimately merged with Peronism, the political movement that ruled the town during the mid-1940s and the 1950s.

=== Recent years ===
The local branch of Rotary International was established on November 22, 1955, and was subsequently recognized by the international organization in 1957. The fires in the town were controlled by the General Roca fire department until the creation of the volunteer fire department of Villa Regina on June 18, 1960. The department was established by Antonio Pirri, who used his house as its headquarters; however, he was not the first chief of the fire department. The firemen started with a Jeep donated by the province of Río Negro and a fire engine donated by Pirri. In 1961, the department requested that the government cede lands to construct a building to house the operation. In May 1961, the donation was approved and the building was constructed; it began operating as the fire department headquarters in 1962.

Up until the 1960s, the economic activities of Villa Regina were regulated by the Chamber of Agriculture, Industry, and Commerce of the Upper Valley (Spanish: Cámara de Agricultura, Industria y Comercio del Alto Valle), or the CAIC, the organization that had also focused on the rest of the cities of the Upper Valley of Río Negro since 1931. On February 20, 1962, the Chamber of Commerce, Industry and Production of Villa Regina was created, replacing the role of the CAIC. The chamber was created to mediate between the different trade unions of the city and to unite their representatives on a board. In 1964, the First National Comahue Fair was held. The 45-day event, organized by the Chamber, was intended to showcase the economical potential of the Comahue Region, as well as to commemorate the 40th anniversary of the founding of Villa Regina. The fair was organized by Bartolo Pasin and Rogelio Chimenti, two local businessmen.

During the Argentine transition from the military junta of the National Reorganization Process to a democratic government, the first constitutional municipal convention took place on May 15, 1987. The convention wrote the Carta Orgánica de Villa Regina, the town's first constitution. The new government system had a mayor instead of a municipal president. The first mayor of Villa Regina was Alfredo Innamorati; he was elected on December 12, 1987.

In September 2013, a 700-metre road that connects the town with the northern hill was pre-innagured, upon the end of the first stage of its construction. The budget for the works was composed by ARS$500,000, invested by the municipal government; while it was complemented with additional ARS$2.5 million of the Argentinian government. The road, named after former Governor of Río Negro "Gobernador Don Marío José Franco", opened the access to 4,500 hectares of land to be urbanized by the municipal government. Further development of the road is scheduled for a span of two years, including the addition of pavement, construction of sidewalks and streetlights. Next to the road, the "Via Cristi" pedestrian path is set to be inaugurated during Easter in 2014, including the unveiling of a 20 metres (66 ft) statue of Christ on top of the northern hill.

== Geography ==
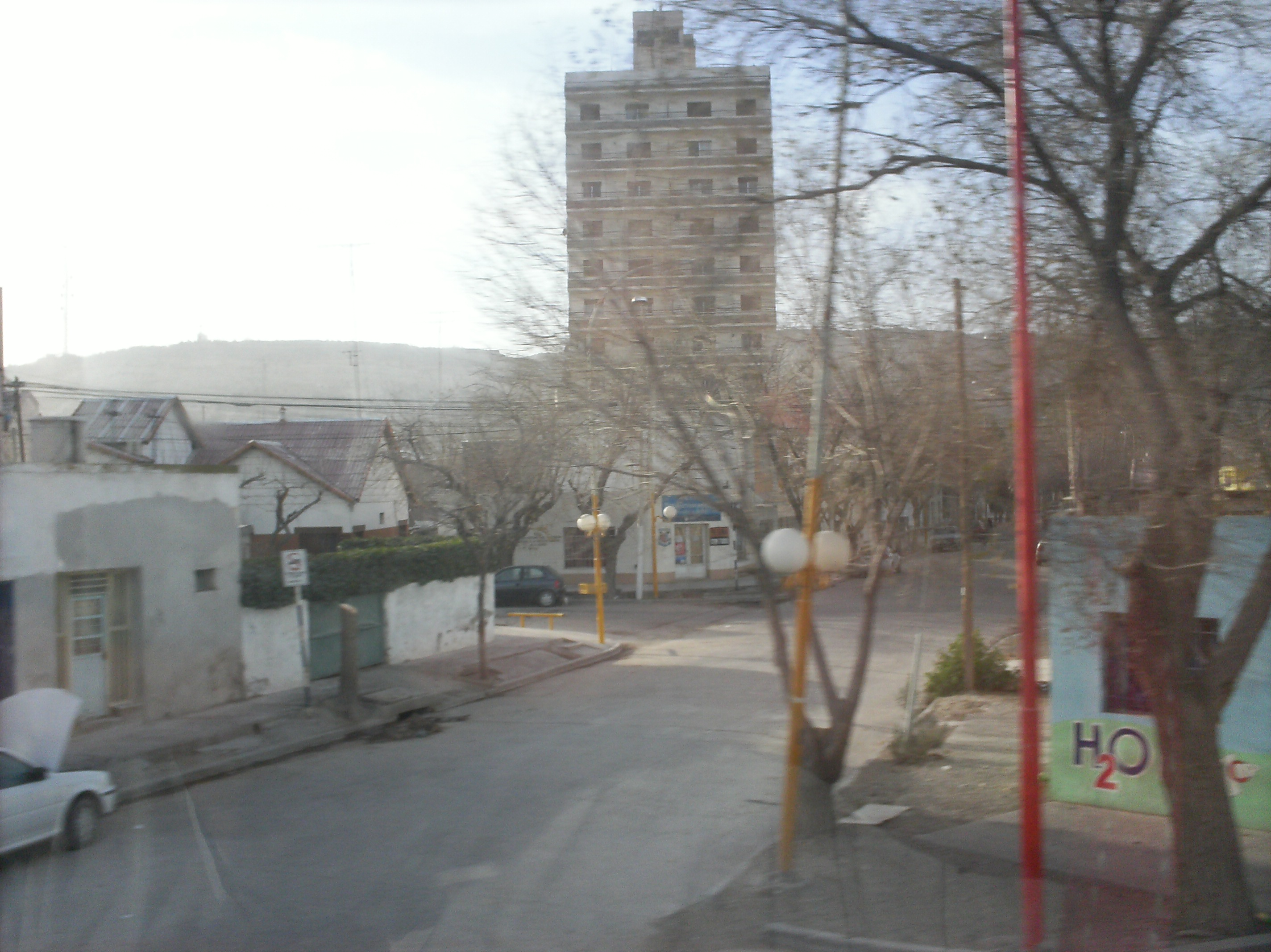
Downtown Villa Regina

Villa Regina lies 250 meters (820 feet) above sea level and is located along the Upper Río Negro (Black River) valley. It is within the limits of the General Roca department in the eastern Rio Negro province of northern Patagonia. Situated nearly 100 kilometers (62 miles) east of Neuquén and 500 kilometers (310 miles) northwest of Viedma, it is connected to the other cities in the orchard-rich Río Negro Valley via Highway 22. The region's landscape is characterized by a plateau to the north, the Río Negro Valley, and a plateau to the south. The plateaus have an average height of 100 meters (330 feet). The town encompasses the territory between the northern plateau and the productive areas near the Río Negro's border, which runs along the southern plateau. It has an irregular street system, with a mixture of old and modern buildings in its center. The flora is typical of the Patagonian steppe and includes small bushes with scarce spiny foliage like larrea, alpataco and atriplex lampa.

=== Climate ===
The area has a semi-arid climate. The average temperature in summer is 20 °C (68.0 °F), while the average temperature in winter is around 8.5 °C (47.3 °F). The yearly precipitation rate ranges from 200 to 400 millimeters (7.9 to 15.7 in) The wind speeds range from 10 kilometers per hour (6.2 mph) to 4.4 kilometers per hour (8.9 mph), between October and February.

Climate data for Villa Regina, Río Negro
Month	Jan	Feb	Mar	Apr	May	Jun	Jul	Aug	Sep	Oct	Nov	Dec	Year
Record high °C (°F)	39.2 (102.6)	36.5 (97.7)	37.7 (99.9)	31.2 (88.2)	27.5 (81.5)	27.2 (81.0)	22.9 (73.2)	28.5 (83.3)	29.8 (85.6)	34.3 (93.7)	34.5 (94.1)	38.4 (101.1)	39.2 (102.6)
Mean daily maximum °C (°F)	30.3 (86.5)	29.9 (85.8)	26.5 (79.7)	21.3 (70.3)	17.8 (64.0)	13.5 (56.3)	13.5 (56.3)	17.1 (62.8)	18.9 (66.0)	22.2 (72.0)	26.7 (80.1)	29.2 (84.6)	22.2 (72.0)
Daily mean °C (°F)	21.4 (70.5)	20.8 (69.4)	17.2 (63.0)	12.8 (55.0)	9.3 (48.7)	6.0 (42.8)	6.2 (43.2)	8.9 (48.0)	11.2 (52.2)	14.3 (57.7)	18.5 (65.3)	20.7 (69.3)	13.9 (57.0)
Mean daily minimum °C (°F)	12.5 (54.5)	11.3 (52.3)	8.1 (46.6)	3.6 (38.5)	1.6 (34.9)	−1.1 (30.0)	−0.8 (30.6)	0.3 (32.5)	3.1 (37.6)	6.0 (42.8)	9.9 (49.8)	11.6 (52.9)	5.5 (41.9)
Record low °C (°F)	1.4 (34.5)	−0.3 (31.5)	−5.4 (22.3)	−5.0 (23.0)	−6.8 (19.8)	−12.4 (9.7)	−10.9 (12.4)	−9.3 (15.3)	−5.9 (21.4)	−2.9 (26.8)	0.3 (32.5)	3.2 (37.8)	−12.4 (9.7)
Average precipitation mm (inches)	19.0 (0.75)	10.0 (0.39)	12.0 (0.47)	20.0 (0.79)	15.0 (0.59)	6.0 (0.24)	17.0 (0.67)	7.0 (0.28)	15.0 (0.59)	34.0 (1.34)	15.0 (0.59)	16.0 (0.63)	186.0 (7.32)
Average relative humidity (%)	57.0	65.0	70.0	73.0	76.0	76.0	76.0	65.0	63.0	65.0	63.0	59.0	67.3
Source: Secretaria de Mineria

Online meteorological data from a personal weather station

== Demographics ==
In 1930, after the 5,000 hectares had been developed and colonized, Colonia Regina had an estimated population of 3,000. The population decreased during the following years, as some settlers decided to move because they could not pay the installments on their lands and others were evicted because they could not pay these installments but refused to move. The 1947 census, the first Argentine census that surveyed Villa Regina, registered 2,154 inhabitants. The census registered 11,360 residents in 1960 and 10,975 in 1970. The Argentine census of 1980 recorded 18,375 inhabitants, which increased to 24,472 by the 1991 census. The census of 2001 registered a total of 27,516, which increased to 33,089 by the 2010 census.

Historical population
Year	Pop.	±%
1930	3,000	—
1947	2,154	−28.2%
1960	11,360	+427.4%
1970	10,975	−3.4%
1980	18,375	+67.4%
1991	24,472	+33.2%
2001	27,516	+12.4%
2010	33,089	+20.3%

== Economy ==
As the largest city in the area, Villa Regina is considered the capital of the Eastern Upper Río Negro Valley micro-region, which includes the rural municipalities of Chichinales, General Enrique Godoy, Ingeniero Luis A. Huergo and Mainqué. The economy of the area around Villa Regina is based largely on agriculture. The surrounding area produces 20% of Patagonia's apples and 28% of its pears. Additionally, the area has vineyards which are used to grow grapes that are then turned into sparkling wine. The city possesses the largest industrial park in the Río Negro province; its main industrial facilities are the canning and bottling plants. The companies in the area that produce concentrate apple juice are based in the city.

== Education ==
A campus of the National University of Comahue was established in the town in 1977. It serves as the university's department of food sciences and technologies. In 2010, it was inaugurated as a campus of the National University of Río Negro, which is focused on careers related to business management, technology and engineering.

The city is the seat of the eastern Upper Río Negro Valley "Zone II" of elementary education. The local Teacher Formation Institute was founded in 1976; it educates teachers of the area between the municipalities of Maniqué and Chelforó.

== Touristic attractions ==
The Indio Comahue Monument, erected on an overlook on the northern hill, is considered the symbol of the town and is also depicted in the municipal coat of arms. The monument is the finish line for the annual trekking trail competition, "Trekking al Indio Comahue." The local museum, the "Museo Comunitario," is located on the site of the former headquarters of the Italian-Argentine Colonization Company. Considered a landmark of the town, the parish church Nuestra Señora del Rosario was built in downtown Villa Regina in 1928 and features a Renaissance style, while the Santa Teresita del Niño Jesús chapel, a bandstand-like structure, was built by the settlers in 1933. It is notable for being the first building on the northern hill.

The Provincial Grape Harvest Festival (Spanish: Fiesta Provincial de La Vendímia), which started in 1973, is celebrated in March in the Cono Randazzo amphitheater. The Comahue National Fair was relaunched in 2004 to celebrate the 40th anniversary of the first one and currently is celebrated every two years. The fair features the exposition of products and demonstrations by companies, as well as regional cultural events.

The city beach on island 58 of the Río Negro is popular with the locals during the summer. Its landscape includes a large variety of trees, including cypress, eucalypt, poplar trees and willows. It also has a camping ground, which is open the entire year.

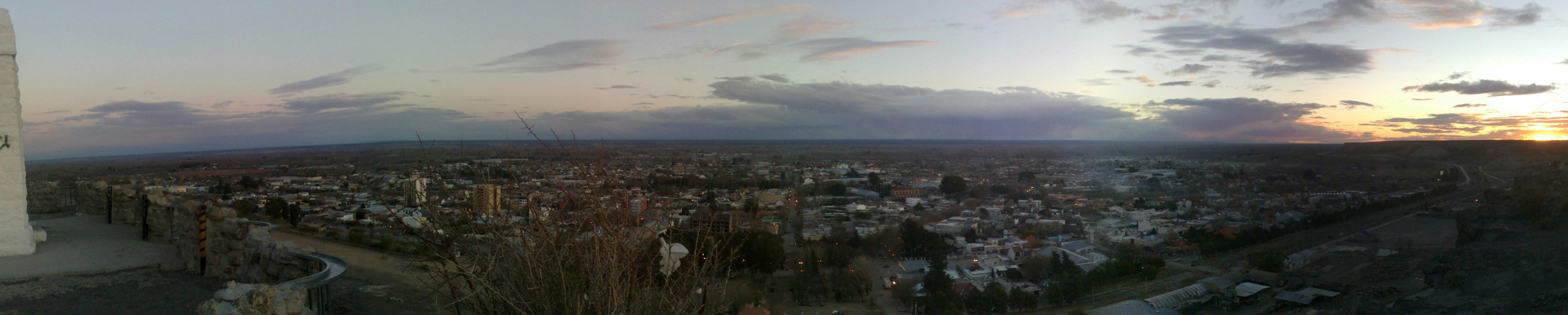
Panoramic view of the city from the northern hill

== References to the city ==
A local song called "Zamba para Villa Regina," written and performed by Mario Ormeño and Susana Furno, is an affectionate musical tribute to the city, expressing pride and love for Villa Regina in the Río Negro province. It was part of a 1974 celebration for the 50th anniversary of the city's founding.

The Italian song by Massimo Priviero called "Villa Regina" is included in the album "All'Italia"
