= Chimpay =

- Municipality and village
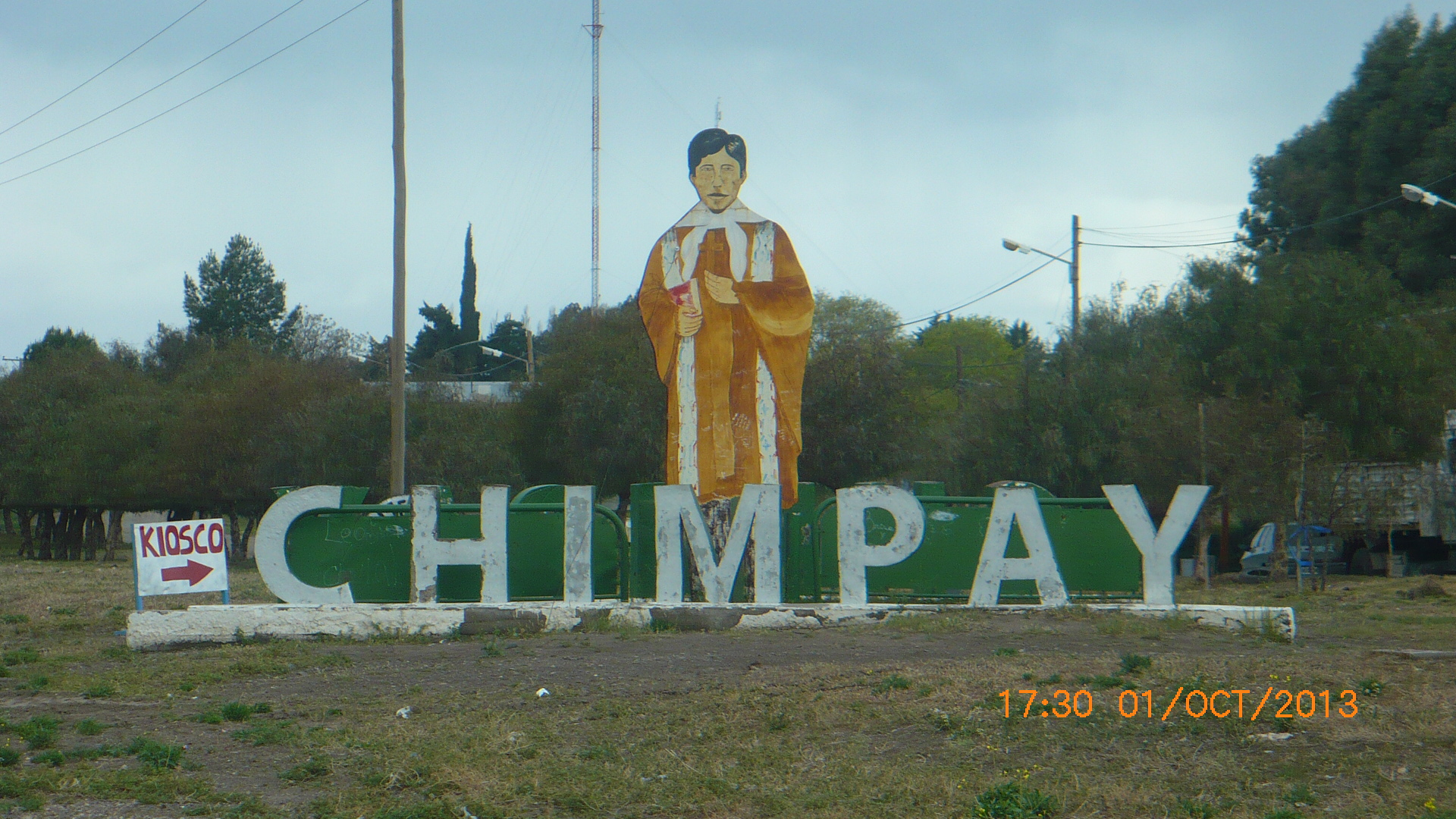
- Entrance to Chimpay

- Location within Argentina
- Coordinates: 39°10′S 66°09′W
- Country: Argentina
- Province: Río Negro Province
- Department: Avellaneda Department, Río Negro
- Established: May 11, 1905

Government
  - Intendant: Gustavo Sepulveda
- Elevation: 489 ft (149 m)

Population (2010 census [INDEC])
  - Total: 4,025
- Time zone: UTC−3 (ART)
- CPA Base: 8364
- Area code: +54 2946
- Climate: BSk

Chimpay is a municipality in Río Negro Province in Argentina. It lies on the National Route 22 in the Mid Valley of the Río Negro.

Populated by the Tehuelche and the Mapuche before the Conquest of the Desert, lonco Manuel Namuncurá established himself there for years, after receiving lands there as a condition to surrender to the Argentine Government. The village is known as the birthplace of his son, blessed Ceferino Namuncurá, who dedicated his short life to help the locals.

The economy is mostly based on its agriculture sector with religious tourism also playing a role. Known for its cherry production, the town is considered the Cherry Capital of the province.

== Etymology ==
Chimpay is a Mapudungun word that means 'curve' or 'turn'. In this case, it refers to the turn that the Río Negro makes near the town.

== History ==
Before it was incorporated to Argentina, the Middle Valley region of the Río Negro was populated by the Mapuche and the Tehuelche nations. The Argentinian Expeditionary Army arrived to the area in the 1870s during the Conquest of the Desert. After years of conflict, the local lonco, Manuel Namuncurá, surrendered to the Argentinian Army in 1884. Salesian priest Domingo Melanesio acted as a mediator in the negotiations with the Argentinian government.

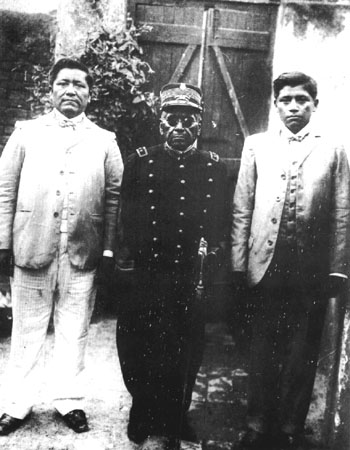
The Namuncurás, left to right: Julián, Manuel and Ceferino

The natives were granted lands in the current Chimpay area. Namuncurá was given the rank of Colonel of the Army by Argentina, and he settled in the area. With Rosario Burgos, a Chilean citizen kidnapped during a raid, he fathered Ceferino Namuncurá, born in 1886. Manuel Namuncurá then found a more suitable area for his tribe and he moved to the current town of San Ignacio, in the Neuquén Province.

The Chimpay railway station was inaugurated in 1889 as a stop in the Bahía Blanca-Confluencia line of the Buenos Aires Great Southern Railway. Around 1900, settlers started to populate the Mid Valley region, which was organized with Choele Choel as its center. At that time, the town was considered a lodging area for travelers. Chimpay later developed as an agricultural productive area.

Ceferino Namuncurá died from tuberculosis at the age of 18 in Rome, on May 11, 1905. Namuncurá was at the time attending a local seminary, and he had met Pope Pius X during his time there. As there had been no official founding ceremony for the town, the day of Namuncurá's death was considered Chimpay's founding date. The town established its first developing committee on April 6, 1934.

After his death, Ceferino Namuncurá was worshiped as a religious figure around the area. The worship of Namuncurá expanded to the rest of the country by the 1960s and Chimpay became a pilgrimage site. A statue of Namuncurá was erected in 1971. In 1999, his beatification was requested after the Milagro de Ceferino. The Argentinian religious authorities attributed the healing of the metastasized uterine cancer of a woman of the Córdoba Province to a miracle performed through the worship of Namuncurá. In 2007, Pope Benedict XVI beatified Namuncurá and he assigned cardinal Tarcisio Bertone to perform a ceremony in Chimpay. The service attracted an estimated crowd of 100,000.

== Geography ==
Chimpay belongs to the Avellaneda Department of the Río Negro Province in northern Patagonia. It lies in the Mid Valley of the Río Negro on the left bank of the river, surrounded by the typical steep slopes that are known in the area as bardas. The general elevation is 149 m (489 ft) above sea level. The climate is described as mild continental and semi-arid.

Served by the National Route 22, it is located about 858 km (533 mi) from the national capital, Buenos Aires.

== Demographics ==
As of the 2010 Argentine census, there was a total of 4,025 inhabitants in the municipality. It recorded a growth of 25,4% in comparison to the 2001 census, when 3,003 people lived in the municipality. Previous censuses showed a total of 1,268 (1991) and 880 (1980) inhabitants, respectively.

== Economy ==
The region's economy is mainly based on agriculture. A number of fruit companies settled in the Mid Valley between the late 1990s and the early 2000s, with an associated population growth. Chimpay is known as the leader in cherries production in the province. Religious tourism, especially among Ceferino Namuncurá's devotees, also brings important revenue to the local economy.

== Local culture ==
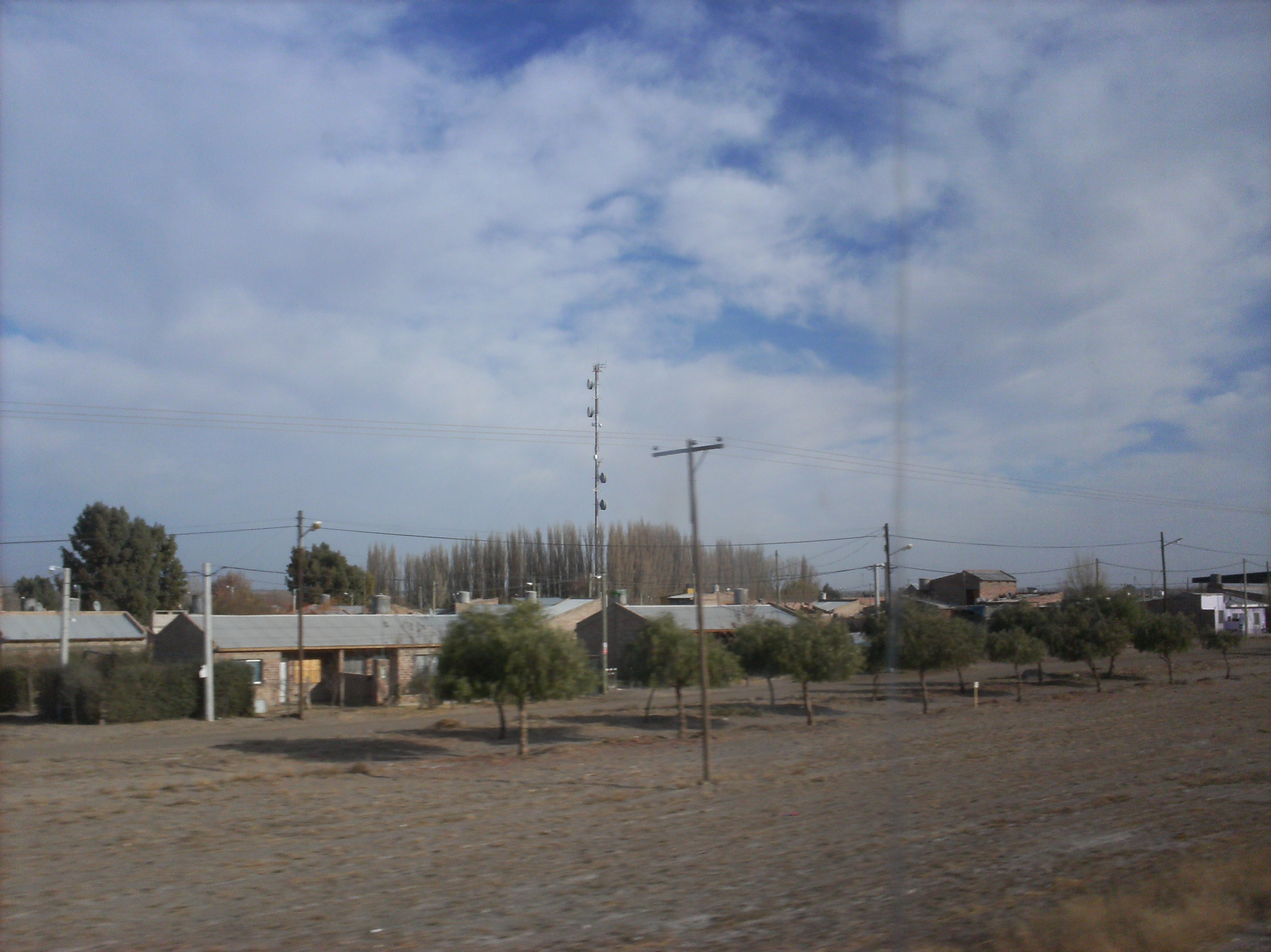
Gravel road in Chimpay

Chimpay is strongly influenced by the figure of blessed Ceferino Namuncurá, who dedicated his short life to helping his people and pursued the goal of becoming a priest to return to the region. Although a small-town life with little activity on its streets most of the year, thousands of pilgrims arrive there in August to celebrate Namuncurá's birth date. The celebration lasts a few days and different activities such as religious services, cultural events and a local craftsmen fair, take place.

The Ceferinian park has around 4 ha of extension with trees, paths and a lagoon. The chapel located there has Mapuche and Tehuelche elements, such as graphic symbols, a mural displaying Jesus Christ with the natives and a tent-shaped roof. Additionally, a 5 m (16 ft) marble statue of him on a 4 m (13 ft) base was unveiled in 2009.

Known for its cherry production, the Provincial Cherry Festival is held every year. In its three days, cultural events, an agricultural fair and a craftsmen fair, among others, take place.
