= Roberto Depietri =

Argentine footballer (1965–2021)

Personal information
- Full name: Roberto Andrés Depietri
- Date of birth: 10 October 1965
- Place of birth: Darwin, Río Negro, Argentina
- Date of death: 4 June 2021 (aged 55)
- Place of death: Bahía Blanca, Argentina
- Positions: Midfielder; winger

Senior career*
Years	Team	Apps	(Gls)
1982–1989	Olimpo	184	(98)
1989–1990	Gimnasia (LP)	35	(11)
1990–1994	Toluca	118	(30)
1994–1995	Talleres	11	(0)
1995–1996	U.N.A.M.	21	(6)
1996	Unión de Santa Fe	2	(0)
1997	Olimpo	1	(0)
Total		372	(145)
- * Club domestic league appearances and goals

Roberto Andrés Depietri (10 October 1965 – 4 June 2021) was an Argentine footballer and representative of players who was mostly distinguished in his career playing for the Bahía Blanca Club Olimpo. He was an attacking midfielder and sometimes a winger. Between 2017 and 2018, he was secretary of Club de Gimnasia y Esgrima La Plata and also represented international player Rodrigo Palacio.

== Career ==
Depietri was born in Darwin, Río Negro in 1965.

Depietri played in both his native Argentina and Mexico, playing in Argentina mostly for Club Olimpo of Bahía Blanca and Club de Gimnasia y Esgrima La Plata. Between 1994 and 1995 he also played for Talleres de Córdoba and briefly in 1996 for Unión de Santa Fe before retiring in Club Olimpo in 1997. In Mexico, Depietri played for Deportivo Toluca for four years between 1990 and 1994 and Club Universidad Nacional between 1995 and 1996.

== Death ==
Depietri contracted COVID-19 in May 2021, and died from the disease on 4 June 2021, aged 55, in Bahía Blanca, Buenos Aires Province.
