= Gilberto Mora (footballer, born 1976) =

Mexican footballer (born 1976)

Personal information
- Full name: Gilberto Mora Olayo
- Date of birth: 4 February 1976 (age 50)
- Place of birth: Mexico City, Mexico
- Height: 1.72 m (5 ft 8 in)
- Position: Midfielder

Team information
- Current team: Tijuana (assistant)

Senior career*
Years	Team	Apps	(Gls)
1997	Toluca	2	(0)
2002–2009	Chiapas	116	(2)
2008	→ Puebla (loan)	15	(2)
2009–2010	Puebla	30	(0)
2010–2011	Tijuana	22	(3)

Managerial career
- 2014–2015: Chiapas Reserves and Academy
- 2015–2017: Tijuana Reserves and Academy
- 2017–2018: Tijuana Premier
- 2018–2021: Tijuana Reserves and Academy
- 2021–2022: Sinaloa (Assistant)
- 2022–2026: Tijuana Reserves and Academy
- 2026–: Tijuana (assistant)
- * Club domestic league appearances and goals

Gilberto Mora Olayo (born 4 February 1976) is a Mexican professional football coach and a former player who coaches the Under-17 team of Tijuana Reserves and Academy. Mora played as a left midfielder until his retirement in 2011.

During his 13 year professional career he played for Toluca FC II, Jaguares, Puebla FC, and Club Tijuana.

== Personal life ==
Mora's son, also named Gilberto Mora, is also a professional footballer.
