= Lamarque, Argentina =

City in Rio Negro Province, Argentina

Coordinates: 39°25′25″S 65°42′0″W

Lamarque is a city in the Avellaneda Department of Río Negro Province, Argentina. It is located within the Río Negro (Black River) valley, about 15 km (9.3 mi) from the city of Choele Choel in the southeast of Isla Grande de Choele Choel. According to the 2010 census by INDEC, the urban area had a population of 7,686.

Lamarque is the birthplace of writer Rodolfo Walsh.
