= Dina Huapi =

- Municipality and village
- Interactive map of Dina Huapi
- Coordinates: 41°04′12″S 71°09′54″W
- Country: Argentina
- Province: Río Negro Province
- Department: Pilcaniyeu Department

Government
  - Type: Mayor-council type

Population (2010)
  - Total: 3,469
- Time zone: UTC−3 (ART)
- Postal code: R8402
- Area code: 0294
- Climate: Csb

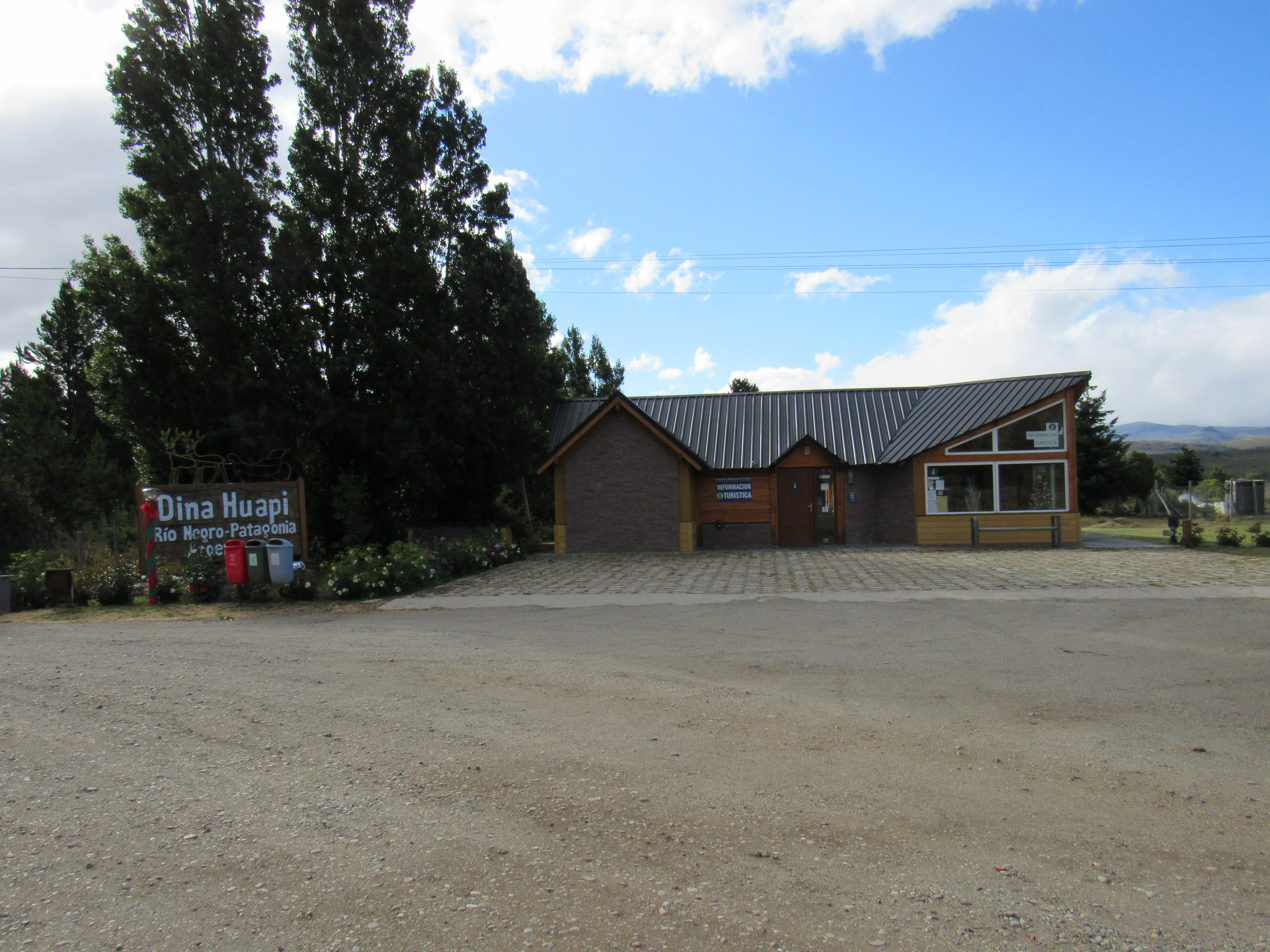
Dina Huapi

Dina Huapi is a village and municipality in Río Negro Province in Argentina.

The area of Dina Huapi was settled by Danish immigrants. The first part of the name is taken for the Spanish name for Denmark; Dinamarca.

== Location ==
It's located on the southeast margin of the eastern end of the Nahuel Huapi Lake, immediately south of the source of the Limay River. The National Route 40 crosses its path through the town, and leads to the neighbouring city of San Carlos de Bariloche to the southwest and to the province of Neuquén to the northeast.

== Climate ==
The climate of this town is cold, arid and continental. The average annual precipitation is about 250 mm per year, partly in the form of snow. The average for the month of January is 17 °C (63 °F), reaching an absolute maximum Tº of 36 °C (97 °F) and that of July is 0°C (32 °F), being able to drop to -22 °C (-8 °F).
