= Claudio Spontón =

Argentine footballer

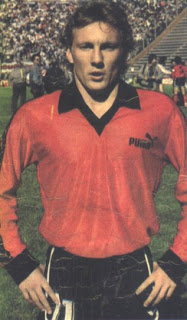

Personal information
- Full name: Claudio Ariel Spontón Imhoff
- Date of birth: 14 September 1968 (age 58)
- Place of birth: Malabrigo, Santa Fe, Argentina
- Height: 1.64 m (5 ft 5 in)
- Position: Forward

Youth career
- Platense

Senior career*
| Years | Team | Apps | (Gls) |
| 1987–1990 | Platense | | |
| 1991–1992 | River Plate | 8 | (1) |
| 1992–1993 | San Martín Tucumán | 21 | (2) |
| 1994 | Platense | | |
| 1994–1995 | Toluca | 22 | (2) |
| 1995 | Lanús | 14 | (0) |
| 1996 | Deportivo Español | 8 | (0) |
| 1997 | Unión Española | 9 | (0) |
| 1997–1999 | Platense | | |
| 1999–2000 | Gimnasia y Tiro | 14 | (5) |
| 2000 | Alianza Lima | 8 | (1) |
| 2000–2001 | Olimpo | 14 | (2) |
| 2002–2003 | Instituto | 12 | (0) |
| 2003 | Acassuso | 6 | (0) |
| 2004 | Estudiantes de Río Cuarto | 6 | (1) |
| Total | | 351 | (55) |

Managerial career
- 2005: Colo-Colo (assistant)
- 2006: Everton (assistant)
- 2007–2008: Unión Española (assistant)
- 2011–2012: Lanús (assistant)
- 2014: Defensores de Salto
- 2019–2020: Platense (reserves)
- 2020: Platense (caretaker)
- 2020–2021: Chaco For Ever (assistant)
- 2021: Platense (reserves)
- 2021: Platense (caretaker)
- 2021–2022: Platense
- 2023: América de Quito
- * Club domestic league appearances and goals

Claudio Ariel Spontón Imhoff (born 14 September 1968) is an Argentine football manager and former player who played as a forward.

== Career ==
Besides Argentina, Spontón played for Toluca in Mexico, Unión Española in Chile and Alianza Lima in Peru.

As a football coach, he has led Defensores de Salto Platense and América de Quito.

== Personal life ==
Claudio is the older brother of the also footballer Waldo Sponton.

He has a close friendship with the former Argentine international Marcelo Espina and was his assistant coach in Chile.
