= Darwin, Río Negro =

Coordinates: 39°12′S 65°46′W

Darwin (Río Negro)
- Municipality and village
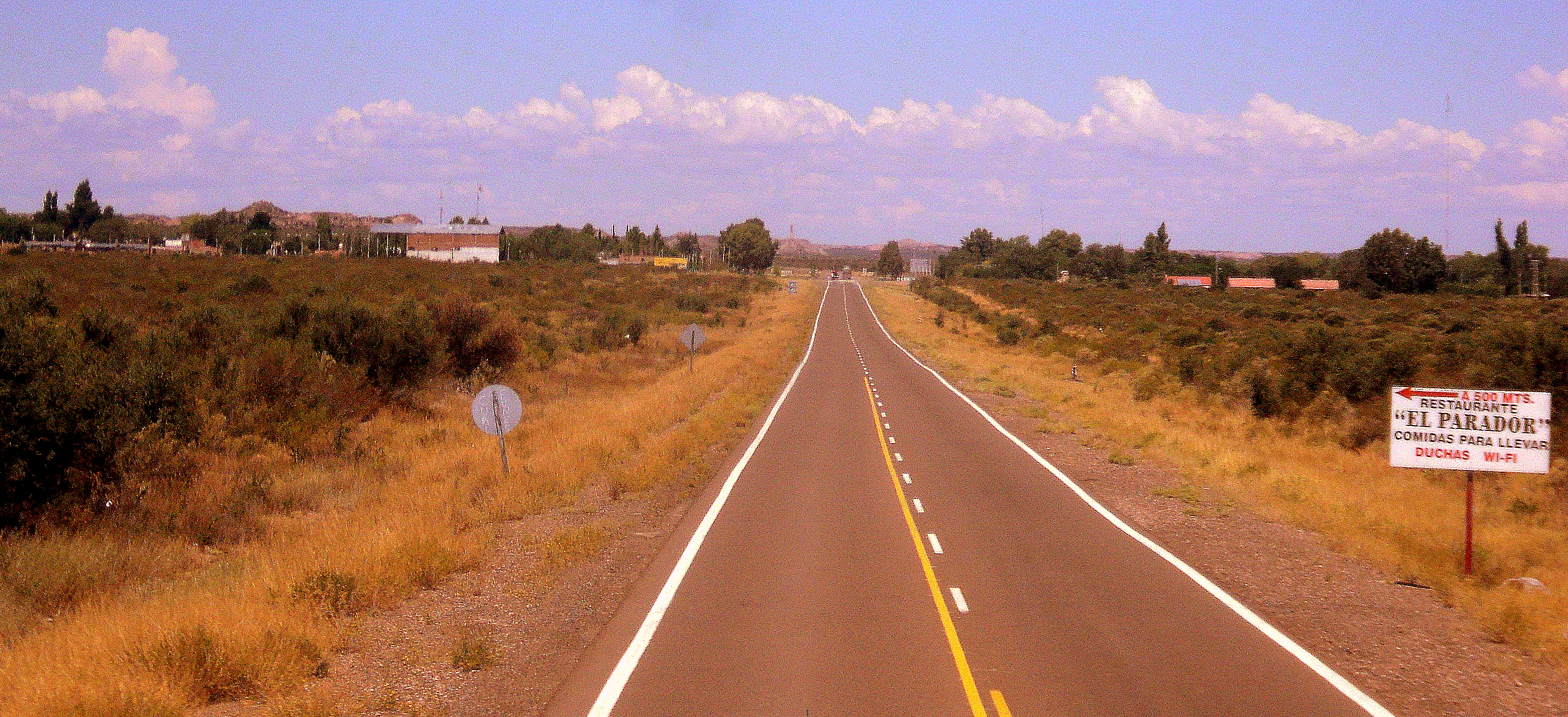
- Interactive map of Darwin (Río Negro)
- Country: Argentina
- Province: Río Negro Province
- Department: Avellaneda Department, Río Negro

Government
  - Intendant: Víctor Hugo Mansilla
- Time zone: UTC−3 (ART)
- Climate: BSk

Darwin is a village and municipality in Río Negro Province in Argentina.
