= Río Negro (Argentina) =

River in Patagonia, Argentina

Negro Curú Leuvú, Río de los Sauces
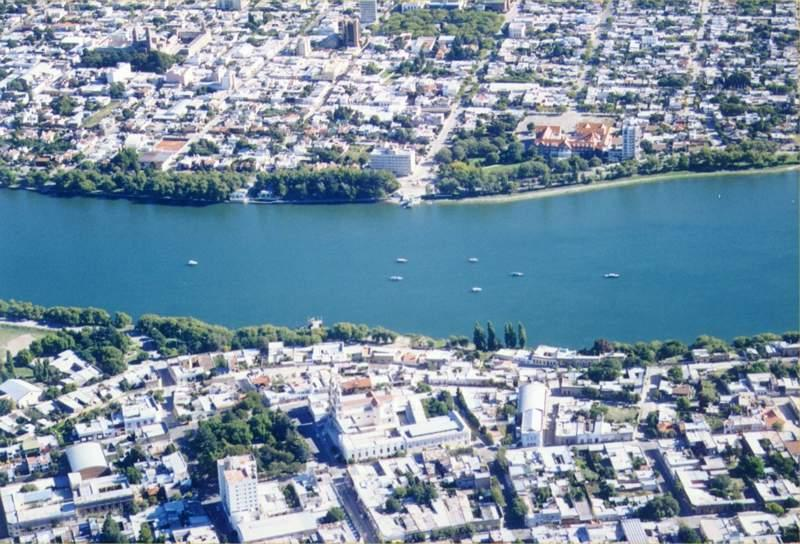
- Rio Negro near the mouth, seen from its northern bank, between the cities of Viedma, Río Negro and Carmen de Patagones, Buenos Aires

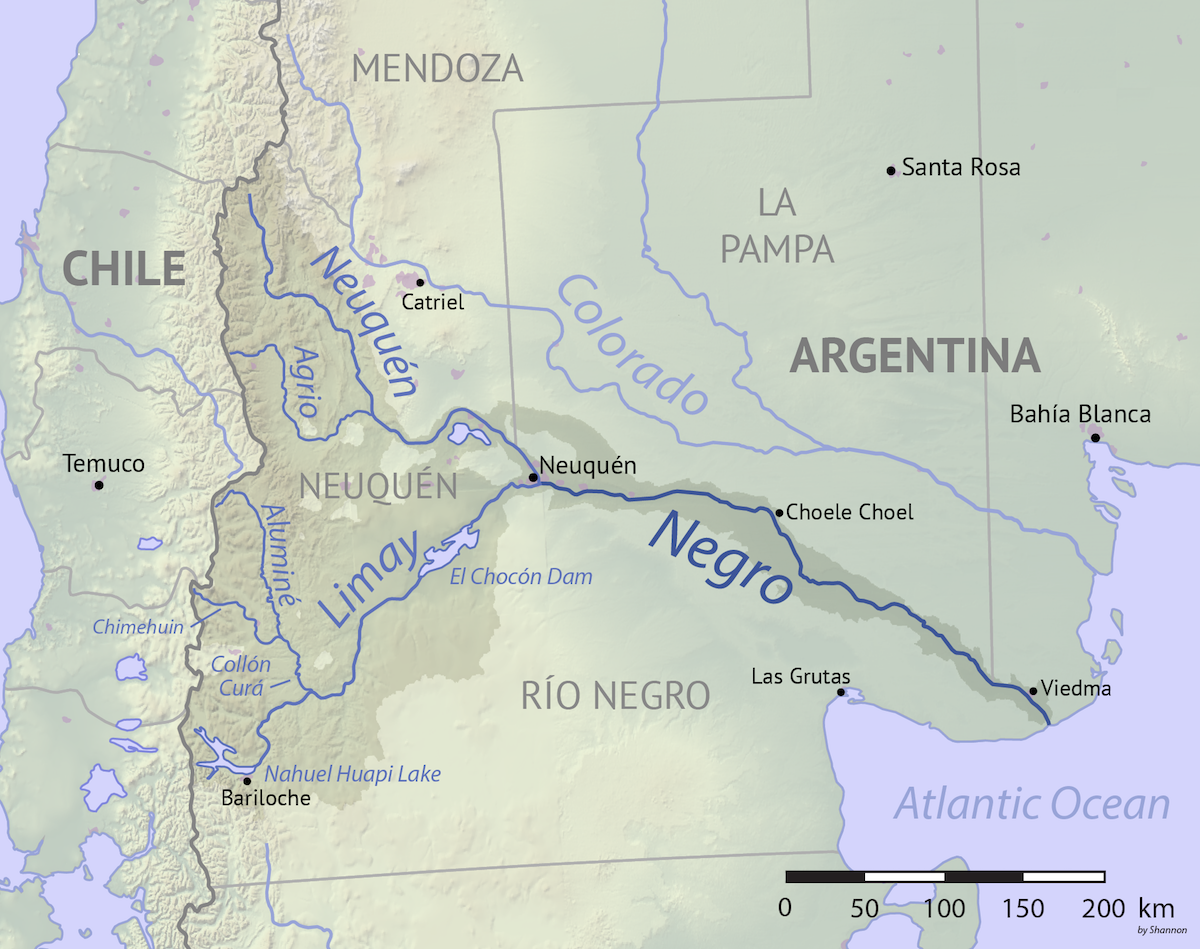
- Map of the Río Negro drainage basin

Location
- Country: Argentina
- Provinces: Neuquén; Río Negro; Buenos Aires
- Region: Patagonia
- Cities: Neuquén; Villa Regina

Physical characteristics
- Source: Limay River
  - location: Nahuel Huapi Lake, Neuquén
  - coordinates: 41°03′20″S 71°09′07″W
  - elevation: 770 m (2,530 ft)
- 2nd source: Neuquén River
  - location: Near Laguna Fea, Neuquén
  - coordinates: 36°10′53″S 70°34′16″W
  - elevation: 2,800 m (9,200 ft)
- Source confluence
  - location: Neuquén, Río Negro
  - coordinates: 38°59′40″S 68°00′07″W
  - elevation: 250 m (820 ft)
- Mouth: Atlantic Ocean
  - location: El Cóndor, Río Negro
  - coordinates: 41°01′50″S 62°47′23″W
  - elevation: 0 m (0 ft)
- Length: 550 km (340 mi)
- Basin size: 102,000 km^{2} (39,000 sq mi)
- Discharge
  - location: Primera Angostura
  - average: 762.5 m^{3}/s (26,930 cu ft/s)
  - minimum: 181 m^{3}/s (6,400 cu ft/s)
  - maximum: 2,068 m^{3}/s (73,000 cu ft/s)

Basin features
- Tributaries
  - left: Neuquén River
  - right: Limay River

Río Negro (Spanish pronunciation: [ˈri.o ˈneɣɾo]; Black River) is the main river of Patagonia in terms of the size of its drainage basin, its associated agricultural produce and population living at its shores. In eastern Patagonia it is also the largest by flow rate. The river flows through the Argentine province of Río Negro which is named after it. Its name comes from the literal translation of the Mapuche term Curu Leuvu, although the water is more green than black. Formerly, it was also known as "river of the willows" because of the big number of weeping willows that grow along the bank. It is 635 km in length.

It originates from the junction of the Limay River and Neuquén River at the border with the Neuquén Province, and flows southeast incised through steppes to the Atlantic Ocean at 41.0223°S 62.7903°W, near El Cóndor beach resort some 30 km (19 mi) downstream from Viedma, Río Negro province's capital.

The river allows the Río Negro province to produce 70% of the pears and 72% of the apples of Argentina. The main area of orchards lie in the middle and upper course of the river. About 48% of the Southern Hemisphere's pears are produced in Río Negro. Besides irrigation, the river is also source of hydroelectricity with small dams on its course. The river's lower 400 km are navigable.

In 1604 the inland area of the river was reached by Spanish explorers departing from Buenos Aires in search of the mythical City of the Caesars. The river served briefly as a natural demarcation between "civilization" and the indigenous territories in the late 1870s and early 1880s during the Conquest of the Desert. In the 1900s Welsh settlers from Chubut were granted land in Choele Choel.

== Valleys ==
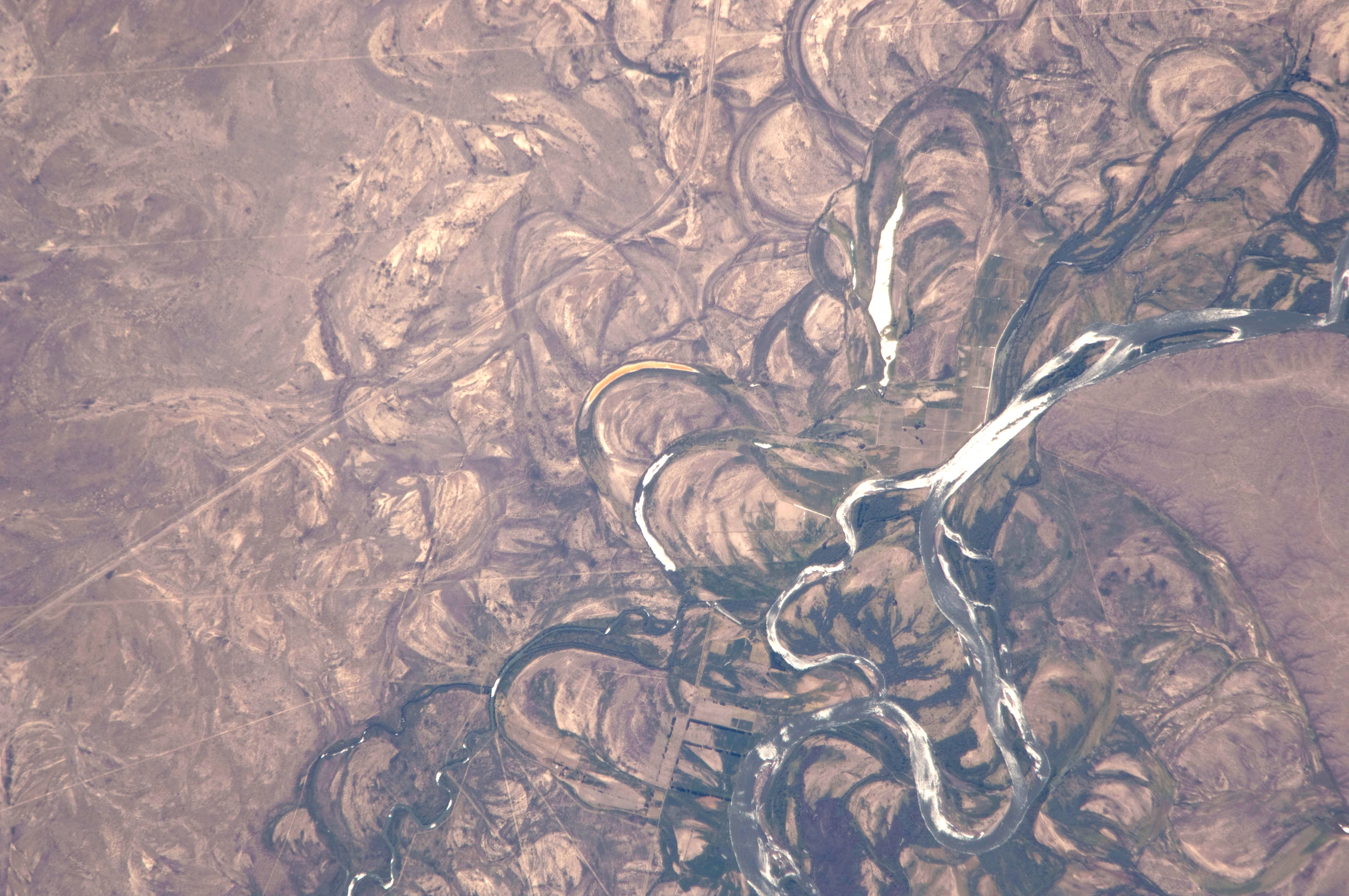
Meander scars, oxbow lakes, and abandoned meanders in the broad flood plain of the Río Negro near Colonia Josefa. 2010 photo from ISS

The river is divided into three parts: The Alto Valle (High Valley) near the beginning of the river, Valle Medio (Medium Valley) near Choele Choel, and Valle Inferior (Lower Valley) near its end.

The river crosses the steppe plains of the province through a forest of around 3 km (1.9 mi) in the Alto Valle, and as wide as 20 km (12 mi) towards the Valle Inferior. In the dry plain it is possible to find seashells and pebble.

=== Alto Valle ===
The main cities in Alto Valle are: General Roca, Cipolletti, Cinco Saltos, followed by many others on the National Route #22. Together with San Carlos de Bariloche, this is the most prosperous part of the province. Most pear and apple plantations are at the Alto Valle, but many also at the Valle Medio.

=== Valle Medio ===
Next to Choele Choel is the Choele Choel Island, in which are Lamarque, Luis Beltrán and Pomona, all of them on National Route #250.

Besides apple and pear cultivation, tomato is also an important crop, being Lamarque the National Capital of the Tomato. Outside the valley, on the more arid lands around town such as Chimpay and Darwin, some cattle is also raised.

=== Valle Inferior ===
Although the term is not as used term as the previous two, Valle Inferior refers to Viedma and all the cities on the province's coast. Fruit is also produced but is not a primary activity. Onion is cultivated as well as some cereals. Alfalfa and maize is cultivated both for human consumption and for feeding cattle, which is the most important activity.

== Name ==
In spite of its name of Negro ("black") the colour is more greenish than black. Nevertheless, the name is the literal translation of its aboriginal Mapuche name of Curú Leuvú. The river was also known by the name of Río de los Sauces ("River of Willows") for the abundant weeping willows along its lower course.

== Regatta ==
The Regata del Río Negro (Black River Regatta), run in this river, is the longest kayak boat-race in the world with its 653 km (406 mi). The competition is divided in six stages and last 8 days (with two days for resting).

The categories are

- K1 men Senior
- K2 men Senior
- K2 men Junior (17 to 20 years)
- K2 women Senior
- K1 men Maxi (older than 36)
- K2 men Maxi
- Touring (open, non professional recreative category)
