= Coronel Belisle =

Coordinates: 39°11′S 65°59′W

- Municipality and village
- Interactive map of Coronel Belisle
- Country: Argentina
- Province: Río Negro Province

Government
  - Intendant: Diego Agüero
- Time zone: UTC−3 (ART)
- Climate: BSk

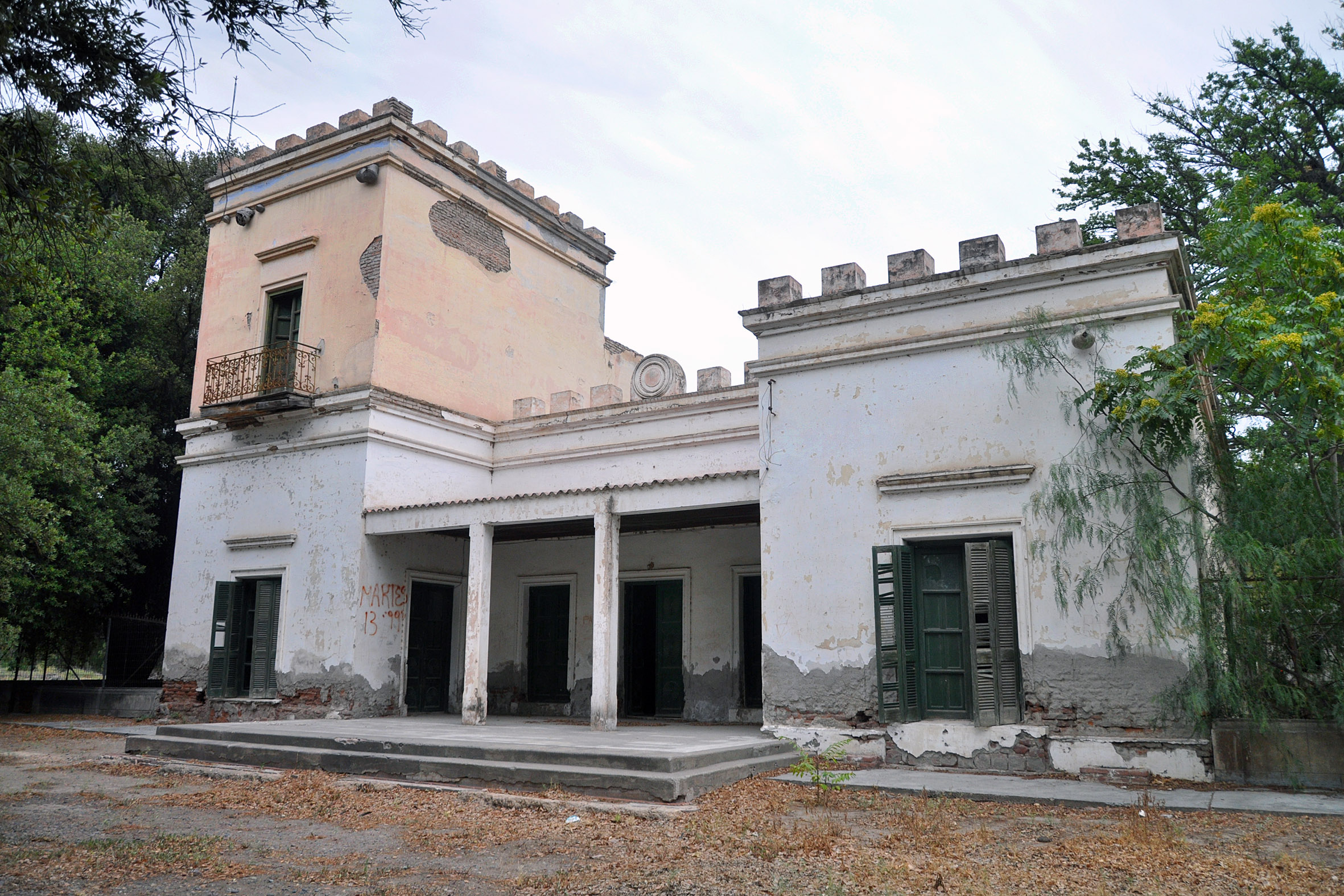
Coronel Belisle

Coronel Belisle is a village and municipality in Río Negro Province in Argentina.
