= Chelforó =

Coordinates: 39°04′S 66°32′W

- Municipality and village
- Interactive map of Chelforó
- Country: Argentina
- Province: Río Negro Province
- Time zone: UTC−3 (ART)

Chelforó is a village and municipality in Río Negro Province in Argentina.
