= Luis Beltrán, Río Negro =

Coordinates: 39°19′S 65°46′W

- Municipality and village
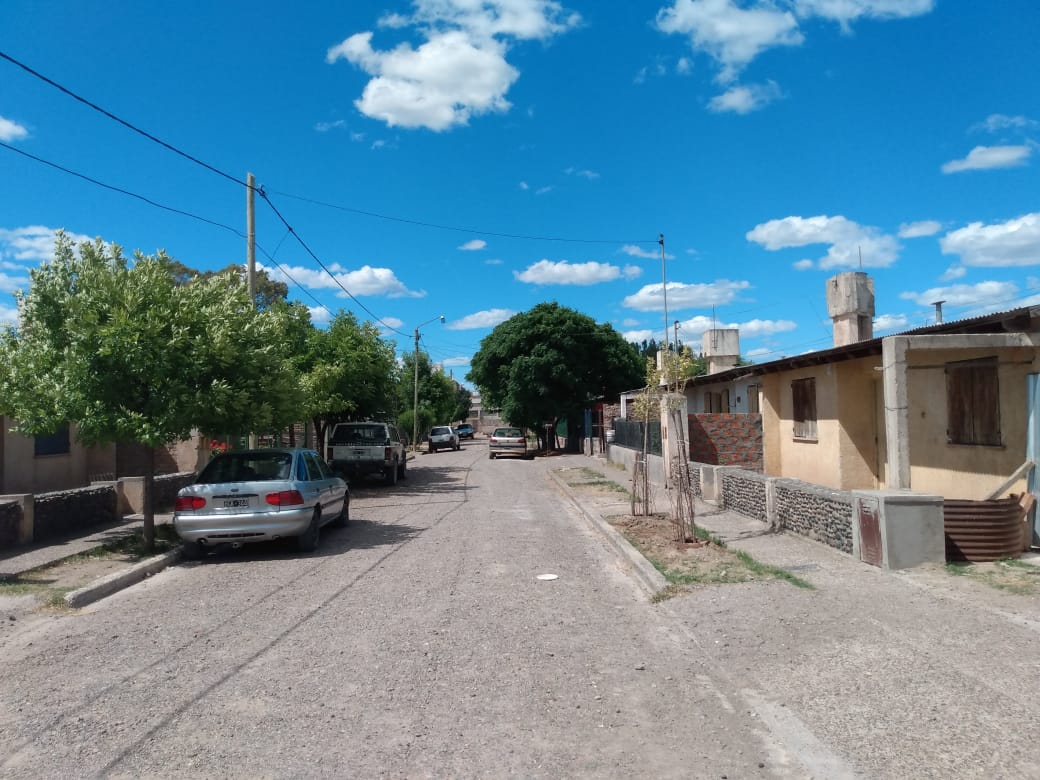
- Luis Beltrán, a city in Río Negro, Argentina

- Seal
- Interactive map of Luis Beltrán, Río Negro
- Country: Argentina
- Province: Río Negro Province
- Time zone: UTC−3 (ART)
- Climate: BSk

Luis Beltrán (Río Negro) (Welsh: Tir Pentre, lit. 'Land (of the) Town') is a village and municipality in Río Negro Province in Argentina.

== Climate ==
Mean annual temperature is 15.3 °C (59.5 °F). June to August are the coldest months with mean temperatures below 10 °C (50 °F) while the warmest months are December to February when mean temperatures exceed 21 °C (70 °F). The record high is 43.3 °C (109.9 °F) in January 2013. There are 215 frost-free days with the first date of frost normally occurring on 29 April and the last date of frost occurring on 25 September.

Precipitation is highly variable from year to year but is generally concentrated in the summer and autumn. The mean annual precipitation is 299.3 millimetres (11.8 in).

Climate data for Luis Beltrán, Río Negro (temperature 1973–2018, precipitation 1971–2018, humidity and precipitation days 1988–2018, extremes 1988–2017)
Month	Jan	Feb	Mar	Apr	May	Jun	Jul	Aug	Sep	Oct	Nov	Dec	Year
Record high °C (°F)	43.3 (109.9)	41.0 (105.8)	38.6 (101.5)	34.0 (93.2)	30.4 (86.7)	24.8 (76.6)	25.2 (77.4)	30.6 (87.1)	34.0 (93.2)	35.2 (95.4)	39.5 (103.1)	41.8 (107.2)	43.3 (109.9)
Mean daily maximum °C (°F)	31.7 (89.1)	30.3 (86.5)	27.0 (80.6)	21.8 (71.2)	17.4 (63.3)	13.7 (56.7)	13.8 (56.8)	16.7 (62.1)	19.5 (67.1)	22.3 (72.1)	27.0 (80.6)	30.2 (86.4)	22.5 (72.5)
Daily mean °C (°F)	23.5 (74.3)	22.1 (71.8)	19.3 (66.7)	14.7 (58.5)	10.8 (51.4)	7.8 (46.0)	7.2 (45.0)	9.2 (48.6)	12.0 (53.6)	15.7 (60.3)	19.0 (66.2)	22.3 (72.1)	15.3 (59.5)
Mean daily minimum °C (°F)	15.1 (59.2)	13.9 (57.0)	11.9 (53.4)	7.4 (45.3)	4.3 (39.7)	1.8 (35.2)	0.9 (33.6)	2.1 (35.8)	4.6 (40.3)	8.2 (46.8)	11.1 (52.0)	14.2 (57.6)	7.9 (46.2)
Record low °C (°F)	4.5 (40.1)	2.8 (37.0)	−0.5 (31.1)	−3.5 (25.7)	−7.0 (19.4)	−9.7 (14.5)	−10.0 (14.0)	−9.4 (15.1)	−7.7 (18.1)	−2.9 (26.8)	−2.5 (27.5)	2.6 (36.7)	−10.0 (14.0)
Average precipitation mm (inches)	26.1 (1.03)	36.6 (1.44)	42.0 (1.65)	30.4 (1.20)	18.2 (0.72)	18.7 (0.74)	13.7 (0.54)	18.9 (0.74)	24.0 (0.94)	25.6 (1.01)	22.3 (0.88)	21.2 (0.83)	299.0 (11.77)
Average rainy days	4	4	5	5	5	5	3	3	4	5	4	3	50
Source: Instituto Nacional de Tecnología Agropecuaria
