= Choele Choel =

- City
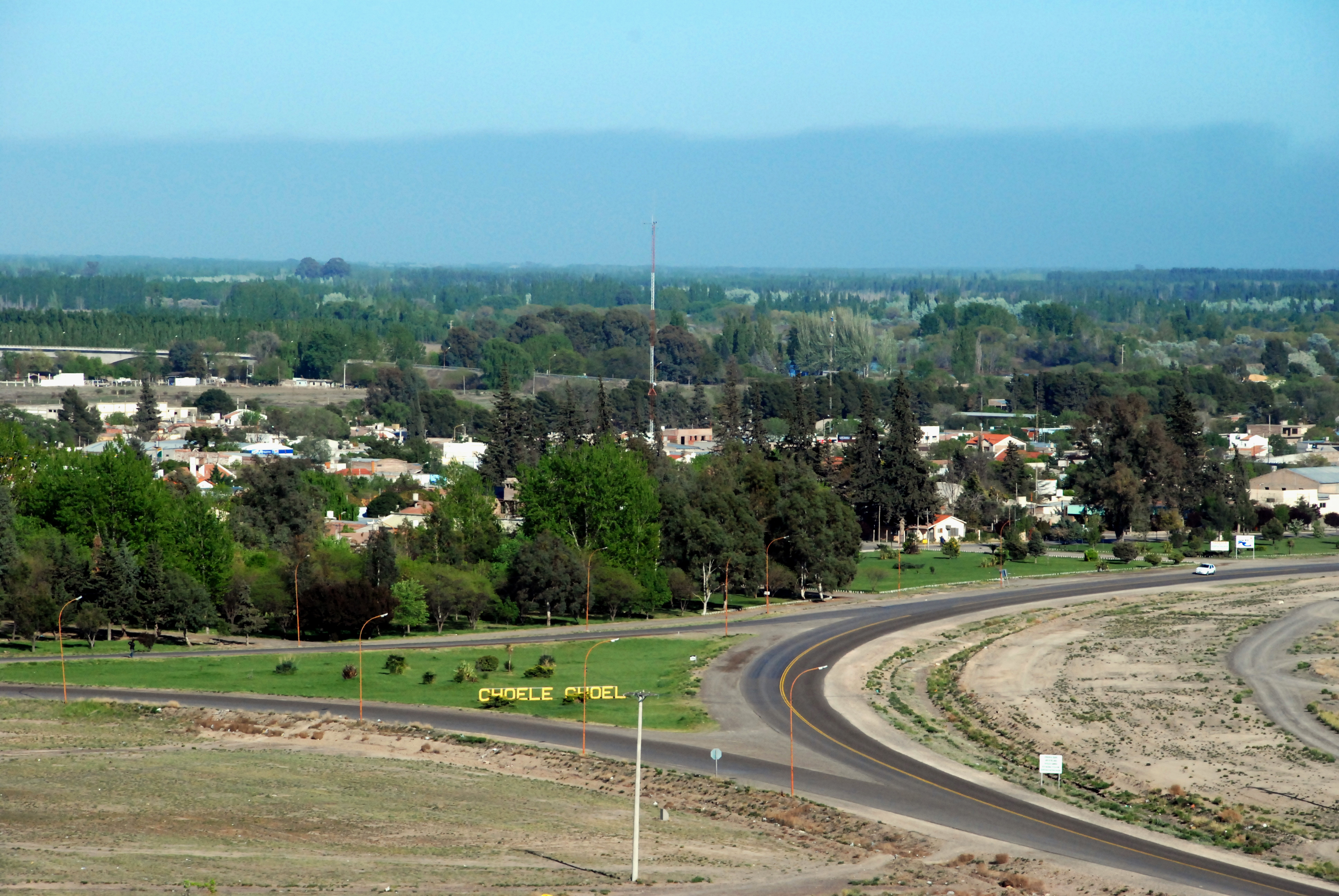

- Coat of arms

- Location of Choele Choel in Argentina
- Coordinates: 39°16′S 65°41′W
- Country: Argentina
- Province: Río Negro
- Department: Avellaneda
- Established: July 9, 1879

Government
  - Intendant: Diego Ramello
- Elevation: 118 m (387 ft)

Population (2010 census [INDEC])
  - Total: 10,642
- Demonym: Choelense
- Time zone: UTC−3 (ART)
- CPA Base: R8360
- Climate: BSk
- Website: Official website

Choele Choel is the capital of the department of Avellaneda in the Argentine province of Río Negro, and the most important settlement within the Valle Medio ("Middle Valley") agricultural area of the Río Negro River in Patagonia.

== Overview ==
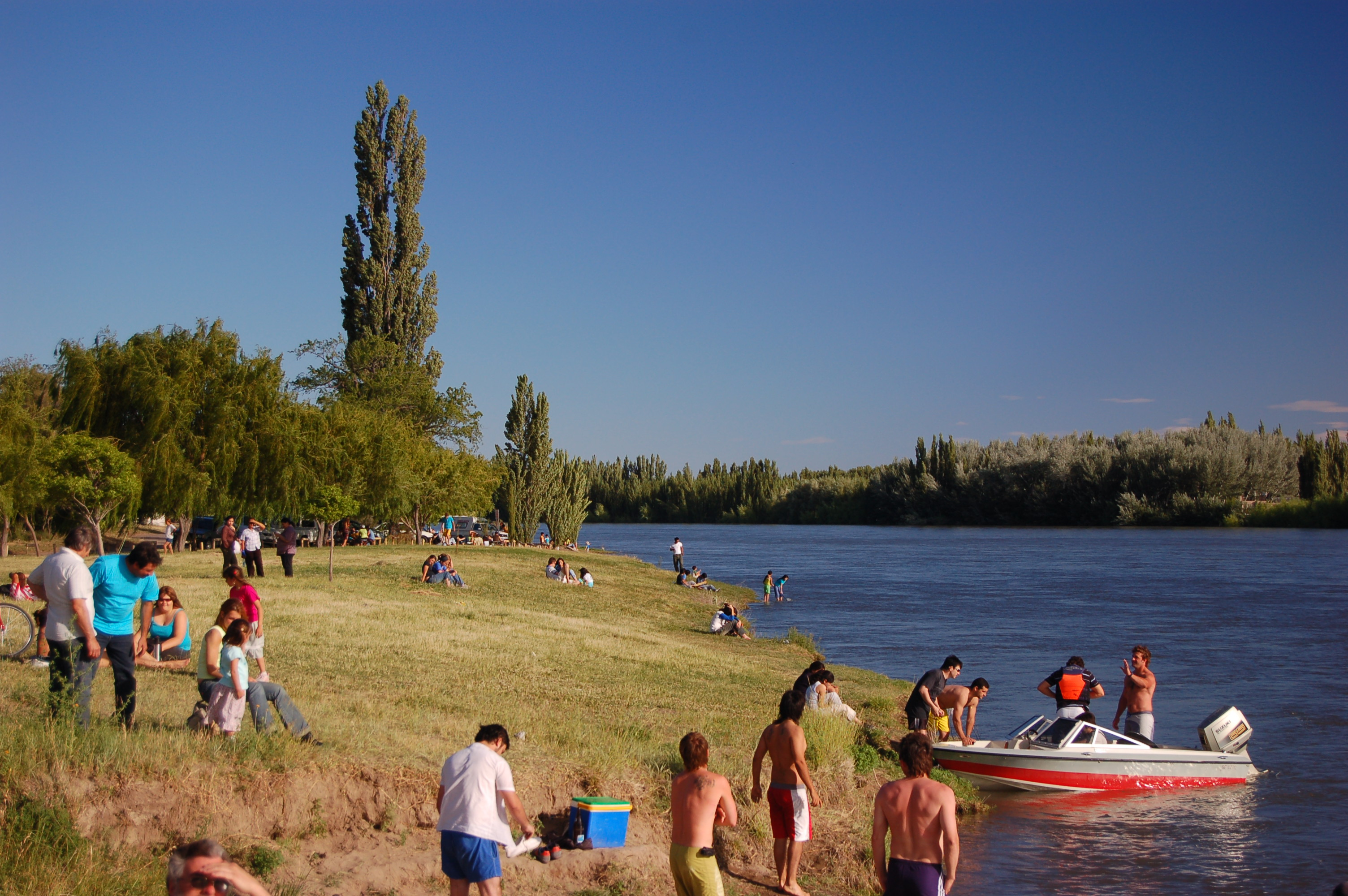
Recreational river-shore in Choele Choel.

Choele Choel is located at the intersection of National Routes #22 and #250, around 1000 kilometres from Buenos Aires, 180 from General Roca, 193 from the Las Grutas beach resort, and 460 from Puerto Madryn. It has a population of 10,642 (2010 census [INDEC]).

Its long-distance bus terminal is a common stop for buses going to both sea-side Patagonia (Puerto Madryn, Río Gallegos, Ushuaia) and North-Andean Patagonia (Bariloche, El Bolsón).

During the 1990s, the airport used to serve regular flights to Buenos Aires, but currently serves only infrequent private charters.

== History ==
Originally named Nicolás Avellaneda, it was founded on July 9, 1879, by General Conrado Villegas. After a flood, the inhabitants moved to a place known as Pampa de los Molinos. They would stay there until March 18, 1882, when the settlement was moved to its current location.

The town acquired special importance during the Conquest of the Desert, when the border between the white man and the Native Americans was pushed south the shore of the Río Negro River.

In 1883, a post office was installed in the town. Salesians arrived in 1890. The Provincial School #10 was created in 1904, and in 1917 the Library. Irish Argentine writer Rodolfo Walsh was born in the town in 1927.

In the 1900s a group of Welsh settlers who were considering leaving Argentina were granted land in Choele Choel. Choele Choel is home to a sizable Russian community (some of them Old Believers). Besides the European immigrant communities common to most of Argentina, the town received refugees from Laos in the 1970s.

=== Etymology ===
There are several versions regarding the meaning of Choele Choel: it might be from the Mapuche language, translated as "yellow flower race," or from the Tehuelche language ("small river rolling-stones"). Another version translates it as "bark scarecrows."

== Climate ==
Choele Choel has a semi-arid climate (Köppen climate classification BSk). Winters are cool with a July mean of 7.5 °C (45.5 °F), with nighttime temperatures that frequently drop below 0 °C (32.0 °F) and occasionally below −10 °C (14.0 °F) on the coldest nights. Cloudy days are common during winter, averaging 7–9 days from June to August, although sunny days can occur as well. Spring and fall are transition seasons that feature warm days, averaging 18 to 28 °C (64.4 to 82.4 °F) and cool nights, averaging 4 to 12 °C (39.2 to 53.6 °F) although temperatures can reach as high as 42 °C (107.6 °F) and low as −10.5 °C (13.1 °F) during these seasons. Summers are hot, dry and sunny, with daytime temperatures averaging 31 to 32 °C (87.8 to 89.6 °F) and cool nighttime temperatures, averaging 14 to 15 °C (57.2 to 59.0 °F). Precipitation is low, averaging 308.9 millimetres (12 in) which is fairly evenly distributed throughout the year.

Climate data for Choele Choel
Month	Jan	Feb	Mar	Apr	May	Jun	Jul	Aug	Sep	Oct	Nov	Dec	Year
Record high °C (°F)	44.9 (112.8)	43.9 (111.0)	42.4 (108.3)	36.7 (98.1)	31.0 (87.8)	26.4 (79.5)	25.9 (78.6)	29.9 (85.8)	34.7 (94.5)	38.2 (100.8)	42.0 (107.6)	44.1 (111.4)	44.9 (112.8)
Mean daily maximum °C (°F)	32.9 (91.2)	31.6 (88.9)	28.2 (82.8)	23.0 (73.4)	18.0 (64.4)	13.9 (57.0)	13.9 (57.0)	16.7 (62.1)	19.5 (67.1)	23.9 (75.0)	28.3 (82.9)	30.9 (87.6)	23.4 (74.1)
Daily mean °C (°F)	24.2 (75.6)	22.9 (73.2)	19.5 (67.1)	15.0 (59.0)	11.0 (51.8)	7.7 (45.9)	7.5 (45.5)	9.4 (48.9)	12.0 (53.6)	16.0 (60.8)	20.2 (68.4)	22.8 (73.0)	15.7 (60.3)
Mean daily minimum °C (°F)	15.4 (59.7)	14.2 (57.6)	11.6 (52.9)	5.9 (42.6)	4.7 (40.5)	1.8 (35.2)	1.5 (34.7)	2.6 (36.7)	4.9 (40.8)	8.2 (46.8)	11.7 (53.1)	14.1 (57.4)	8.1 (46.6)
Record low °C (°F)	3.2 (37.8)	2.0 (35.6)	−2.0 (28.4)	−6.4 (20.5)	−10.5 (13.1)	−12.8 (9.0)	−12.2 (10.0)	−11.0 (12.2)	−6.9 (19.6)	−8.8 (16.2)	−0.6 (30.9)	−1.0 (30.2)	−12.8 (9.0)
Average precipitation mm (inches)	21.0 (0.83)	23.5 (0.93)	32.2 (1.27)	29.3 (1.15)	29.9 (1.18)	19.6 (0.77)	20.9 (0.82)	13.7 (0.54)	24.4 (0.96)	36.0 (1.42)	28.3 (1.11)	30.1 (1.19)	308.9 (12.16)
Average relative humidity (%)	37.0	41.0	48.0	54.5	62.3	66.5	64.0	53.8	49.8	46.3	40.8	38.3	50.2
Source: Secretaria de Mineria

== Access ==
The points of access are through National Routes RN 22 and RN 250. Choele Choel also has an authorised airport for small private planes and helicopter arrivals.

== Activities ==
The most developed activities in this location are cattle breeding, agriculture, and manufacturing of raw materials such as tomatoes, apples, pears, strawberries, etc. into sauces and jellies.
