= Miguel Saiz =

Argentine politician (1949–2019)

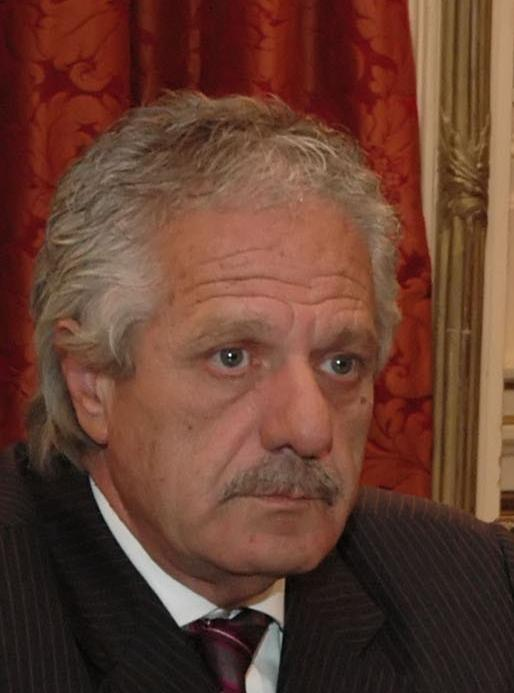

Governor of Río Negro Province
- In office December 10, 2003 – December 9, 2011
- Lieutenant: Mario De Rege; Bautista Mendioroz
- Preceded by: Pablo Verani
- Succeeded by: Carlos Soria

Personal details
- Born: May 17, 1949 Montevideo, Uruguay
- Died: October 22, 2019 (aged 70) Buenos Aires
- Party: Radical Civic Union
- Profession: lawyer

Miguel Ángel Saiz (May 17, 1949 – October 22, 2019) was an Uruguay-born Argentine politician latterly of the Radical Civic Union (UCR), who served as governor of Río Negro Province between 2003 and 2011.

== Beginnings ==
Born in Montevideo, Uruguay, Saiz studied at the National University of Córdoba and became a lawyer. He became affiliated with the centrist UCR in 1983, and subsequently directed the National Register of Secured Credit, was Vice President of the Forensic Fund of Río Negro, and President of the SanCor co-operative's insurance division. He was elected Councilman in General Roca in 1989, and mayor of the city in 1991; he was re-elected in 1995 and served until 1999. He became a provincial deputy that year and was president of the Río Negro branch of the UCR-led Alliance (in power nationally between 1999 and 2001 under President Fernando de la Rúa).

== Governorship of Río Negro ==
Saiz was elected governor of the province in 2003, defeating Carlos Soria. He became a leading supporter within UCR ranks of the left-wing Peronist President Néstor Kirchner, and helped form the "K Radicals" caucus (UCR supporters of Kirchner).

Saiz ran for re-election against Justicialist Party politician Miguel Ángel Pichetto in the 2007 gubernatorial race. President Kirchner considered backing Saiz at the expense of his own party, though ultimately opted to play no role in the provincial election. Saiz won re-election over Pichetto by around 5% with the support of various leftist parties, and his membership in the UCR was subsequently suspended by the party committee. Eventually in 2011, he withdrew supporting Cristina Kirchner.

During his tenure in office he banned the use, storage and transport of mercury and cyanide in Río Negro, allowed fracking, incentivized science and the development and technology through state-owned INVAP, eliminated slums by building new affordable housing, and invested on the Tren Patagónico rail line.

== Later years and death ==
In the 2013 legislative elections, Saiz became the UCR's senatorial candidate for Río Negro after defeating Horacio Massaccesi and Fernando Chironi in the primaries. He lost, coming in third place after Miguel Pichetto and Magdalena Odarda.

In 2016 he was sentenced to 6 months in prison (suspended) and was barred from holding public office for 12 years for abusing his authority as a public officeholder.

Saiz died of cardiovascular disease on 22 October 2019, aged 70, in Buenos Aires, where he had traveled to watch a football match between Boca Juniors and River Plate and attend political meetings.

Preceded by Pablo Verani	Governor of Río Negro; 2003—2011	Succeeded by Carlos Soria
