= Susana Freydoz =

Argentine nutritionist and murderer (born 1951)

- Born: Susana Graciela Freydoz; 18 April 1951 (age 75); Neuquén, Neuquén Province, Argentina
- Occupation: Nutritionist
- Spouse: Carlos Soria (m. 1970; died 2012)
- Children: 4 (including María Emilia and Martín)
- Status: Paroled in 2023
- Conviction: Murder under aggravating circumstances (Note: In the Penal Code of Argentina, murder with aggravating factors is punishable by life imprisonment. However, in Freydoz's case, the court found mitigating factors within the charges.)
- Penalty: 18 years in prison

Susana Graciela Freydoz (born 18 April 1951) is an Argentine nutritionist and convicted murderer who served as First Lady of Río Negro Province as the wife of Governor Carlos Soria.

On 1 January 2012, Freydoz shot and killed her recently inaugurated husband after an emotional crisis caused by pathological jealousy following the public knowledge of Soria's affair with a 36-year-old kinesiologist and daughter of one of his friends.

== Early life and youth ==
Freydoz was born in April 1951 in Neuquén, Neuquén Province, the daughter of Alberto José Freydoz and Ana Emma Kranke. She met Carlos Soria in the 1960s in General Roca, Río Negro, moving to Buenos Aires when they finished school to pursue different careers at the University of Buenos Aires (UBA).

After enrolling in UBA, Freydoz decided to study nutrition while Soria joined the faculty of law. As told by Freydoz's and Soria's friends at the time they studied at UBA, their relationship was marked by Freydoz organising Soria's daily life, including cooking for him, doing the laundry, and economically contributing to their lives by working at a grocery store or selling cockades in Buenos Aires Underground stations.

== Marriage ==
Freydoz and Soria were married in the late 1970s. The couple had four children and, after Freydoz's and Soria's graduations, the family resided in General Roca. Their eldest son, Martín, testified at his mother's trial that Soria was largely absent from the home because he served as a senator in Buenos Aires. Martín added that Freydoz was dedicated to their upbringing and that he learned to help with the house's chores from an early age.

After the killings of Maximiliano Kosteki and Darío Santillán, two young men who were killed by police in Buenos Aires in June 2002 amid persisting protests from the December 2001 riots, public outcry forced Soria, then in charge of the Secretariat of Intelligence, to move back to Río Negro Province, where he served as the mayor of General Roca for eight years until 2011.

The relationship between Freydoz and Soria, marked by his constant authoritarian behaviour and infidelities, began to collapse in the context of the 2011 Argentine general election and Soria's victory in the race for Governor of Río Negro Province. Towards the end of 2011, a long-standing affair between Soria and Paula, a 36-year-old kinesiologist and daughter of one of Soria's lifelong friends, began to cause rumours and gossip in the couple's social circles and media.

After the 10 December 2011 inauguration of Soria as Governor, Freydoz's mental health took a downward turn, beginning to suffer from paranoia and pathological jealousy. According to two of Freydoz's friends who testified at the trial, she was consumed by anger at the intimate nature of the relationship between Soria and the young woman. Elena Müller, a close friend of Freydoz, said in court that she had told her that if she caught Soria and Paula together, she would "smash" them.

== Murder ==
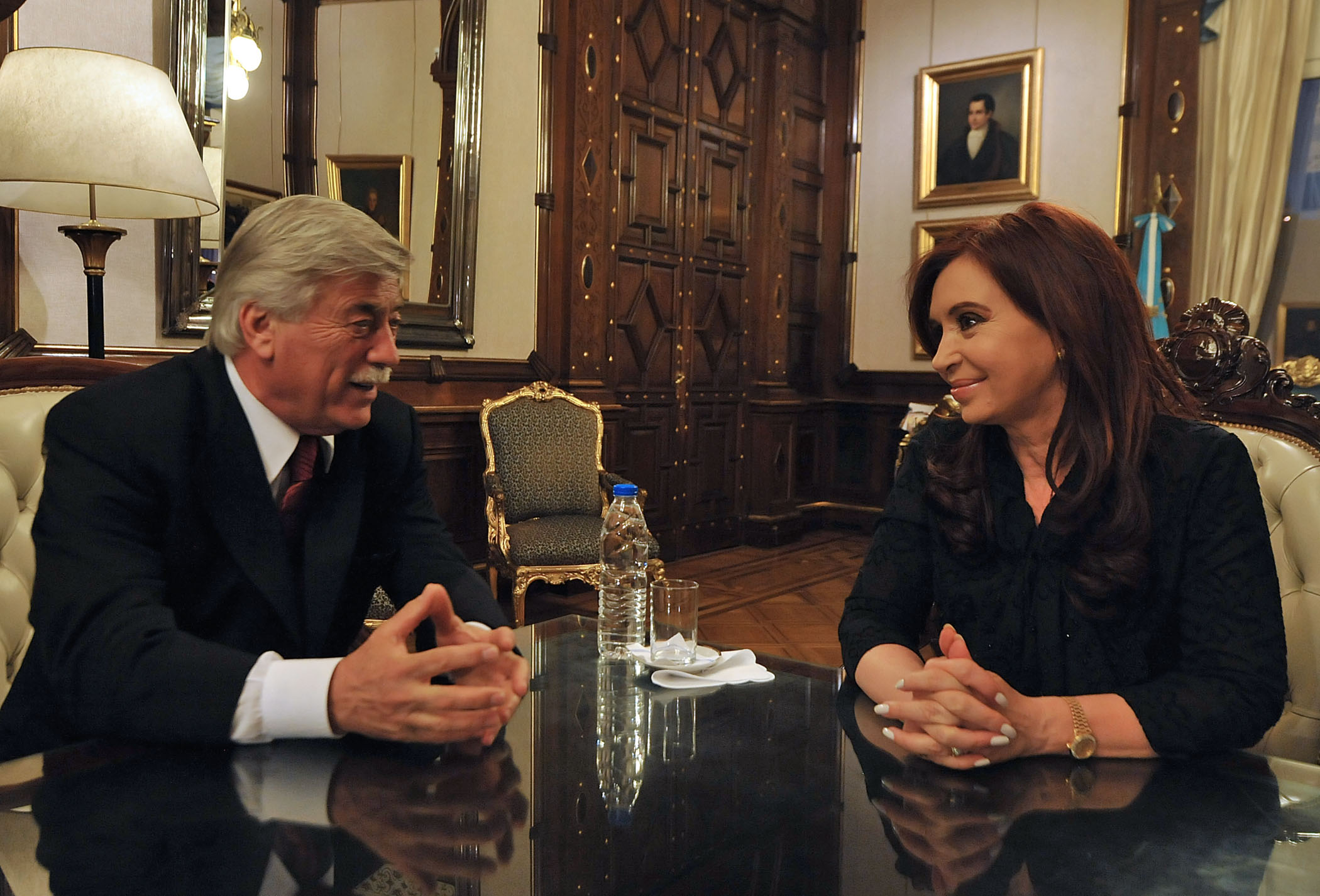
Soria met in September 2011 with President Cristina Fernández de Kirchner, who supported his governorship race in Río Negro.

On New Year's Eve 2011, Soria and Freydoz began arguing in the evening as the family prepared pork shoulder for dinner. Freydoz, angered by the long-standing love affairs with Soria, scolded him for several unrelated issues, including cutting thick slices of pork and for the heat inside the kitchen when Soria turned on the oven to reheat the meat. Soria, tired of Freydoz's criticisms, went to the backyard and got into the swimming pool. She followed him and blamed her husband for making his granddaughters ask to join him in the pool when he knew that their parents did not want the girls to swim at that hour. Soria did not respond and deliberately submerged under water to avoid hearing Freydoz, which upset her further.

The family had invited all the Soria children to an estate in Paso Córdoba, a village near General Roca. However, aware of their parents constant arguments, Martín had refused to go with his family on New Year's Eve. After dinner, the arguments between Soria and Freydoz increased when she confronted him over his romantic affairs. According to María Emilia, the couple's daughter who spent the evening with them, Soria retired to his room at around 3 a.m. and was followed by an increasingly angry Freydoz who slammed the bedroom's door behind her.

Inside the room, Freydoz continued to reproach Soria's extramarital relationships and rumors of children out of wedlock while leaving her behind to raise the children and take care of his ailing father in the 1970s. María Emilia was washing the dishes and had closed her bedroom's door, where her boyfriend Mariano Valentín was waiting for her, due to shame at her parents' strong argument with Valentín at home. As María Emilia was finishing with the dishes, she heard a gunshot from her parents' room and began screaming. Valentín reported waking up to his girlfriend's screams and that he rushed out of the room to look what had happened. When they entered the room, they found Freydoz shaking and babbling. She had taken a .38 Smith & Wesson revolver from the bedside table and shot Soria in the face as he lay in bed amid the verbal exchange.

Freydoz's daughter stated that her mother was upset because Soria had not toasted with her at midnight and that the last thing she heard from her father was that he told Freydoz to kill herself (when she said that he was going to cause that) and to stop "busting (my) balls." Freydoz had previously threatened Soria with committing suicide by jumping off a ninth floor like the First Lady of Neuquén Province Liliana Planas who killed herself in December 2009 after dealing with depression in the relationship with her husband, Governor Jorge Sobisch. It was later known that when Freydoz grabbed the revolver, she pointed the gun to either her head or chest and told Soria that she was going to kill herself. Upon realising that Soria was indifferent to her alleged imminent suicide, Freydoz lost control of her anger and shot him in the face less than 170 cm (67 in) from Soria.

María Emilia and Valentín took Freydoz out of the room in fear that she could commit suicide with the same revolver. Police and medical personnel arrived shortly afterward and doctors pronounced Soria dead on the scene. Martín drove to the residence when he was informed of the shooting, frantically reacting to seeing his father dead and asking his mother, "What did you do to him? Bitch!" Freydoz was taken to the home of a relative in Allen, Río Negro, where she remained sedated until her arrest in the following days. She was subsequently charged with the aggravated murder of her husband.

== Reactions ==
Freydoz's eldest son Martín Soria speaking to media about the crime (File in Spanish language), 6 January 2012

The killing of Governor Soria shocked the province. Soria's running mate and Vice-Governor Alberto Weretilneck initially stated that Soria had died during a domestic accident while handling a firearm. Rumors among provincial high-ranking officials already pointed in the early hours of the following day to the suspicion that Soria had been shot by Freydoz during a strong argument between them.

From national authorities, Senator Miguel Ángel Pichetto, the chief of the bloc of Senators for the ruling Front for Victory party (to which Soria belonged), said that he had briefed President Cristina Fernández de Kirchner about Soria's death, adding that Fernández de Kirchner had instructed him to uphold institutionality in Río Negro Province.

Multiple governors of Argentine provinces expressed shock and sadness at Soria's death. José Manuel de la Sota, the governor of Córdoba Province said the news of Soria's killing left him "cold" and referred to Soria as "a friend" adding that he lamented his tragic death. Governor of Buenos Aires Province Daniel Scioli described Soria as a "hardworking political man" as well as a "fighter" and a "great Peronist."

Others who expressed condolences were former President Eduardo Duhalde who remembered Soria as hardworking during his position at the Secretariat of Intelligence. Fabiana Ríos, governor of Tierra del Fuego Province, José Luis Gioja, governor of San Juan Province and Governor of La Rioja Province Luis Beder Herrera also expressed condolences, calling Soria a great Peronist militant, and calling for the quick solving of the case.

Former Río Negro governor Pablo Verani said that Soria was "excessively passionate" but added that he (Verani) was "destroyed" at Soria's death.

The following day, Vice-Governor Weretilneck took office as successor to Soria. Weretilneck declared a day off in honor of Soria and several days of mourning. At the funeral, Oscar Parrilli represented the national government in his role as General Secretariat of the Presidency.

Soria's killing drew attention to the relationships of politicians and their wives in Argentina. Writing for Todo Noticias, journalist Julio Bazán compared Freydoz to other cases of tragedies in high-stakes politics, citing the case of President Carlos Menem's former partner Martha Meza, mother of Menem's son Carlos Nair. The woman committed suicide in 2003 by ingesting a lethal dose of herbicide amid the political scandal following her demand that Menem recognize Carlos Jr. as his child.

Bazán also mentioned President Menem's executive order in 1990 to forcefully evict First Lady Zulema Yoma from the presidential residence in Olivos, Buenos Aires, which resulted in uniformed military members pushing Yoma and her children off the residence's premises. Another case brought by Bazán was the 1993 public shaming of First Lady of San Luis Province María Alicia Mazzarino after her husband, Governor Adolfo Rodríguez Saa, was kidnapped and tortured at a motel by the boyfriend of his lover Esther Sesín. Bazán made a mention of a book about these tragedies and infidelities written by author Cynthia Ottaviano.

== Legal proceedings ==
=== Trial ===
Freydoz was charged with murder under two aggravating circumstances: the relationship with the victim and the use of a firearm; crimes that, under the Penal Code of Argentina, warrant a sentence of life imprisonment if no mitigating factors can be proven.

The trial against Freydoz began on 15 October 2012 in General Roca. Freydoz's defense alleged that due to Soria's lifelong authoritarian character and infidelities, Freydoz had reached a point at which she killed him under emotional distress. The defense also said that Freydoz had mixed alcoholic drinks with alprazolam on the night of the crime and that she was therefore not fully responsible for her actions.

Among the witnesses who testified during the trial, biochemist Cristina Rubio said that Freydoz was mentally fit at the time of the killing and that she responded coherently when interviewed in the first hours after the shooting. Rubio also confirmed that the levels of alcohol and medications in Freydoz's blood stream were not toxic when she shot Soria.

Two witnesses supported the position of the state that Freydoz was not insane or mentally disturbed when she killed Soria. Edgardo Peacock, a urologist and friend of Soria since 1964, stated that Soria had never confided any infidelity and that Freydoz was distant and cold, as well as extremely critical of her husband. Peacock also testified that he never saw visible mental troubles in Freydoz. Peacock's wife, Elsa Romagnoli, who was close to Freydoz, agreed with her husband that Freydoz did not show mental disturbances, pointing instead to an obsessive jealousy. She said that the couples shared their last dinner on 22 December 2011, where Soria scolded Freydoz for constantly calling him "daddy."

Peacock added that Freydoz's obsession regarding Soria and Paula went as far as Freydoz calling the medical agency where Paula worked as a kinesiologist, complaining to the administratives of the medical center that Paula did not work as a kinesiologist, and suggesting that she was providing her husband with intimate services. Ending his testimony, Peacock stated that while never confessing to an infidelity, several comments from Soria indicated that he had a romantic affair with another woman.

The prosecution also gave a report about what they called the "suicide game", chronicling the long-standing threats by Freydoz to Soria about her imminent suicide. Documents included instances in which Soria called her "fucking crazy" and accused her of manipulative behavior. In another incident, Soria had opened the windows of the upper-level room and asked Freydoz to jump off and kill herself. Freydoz's response to Soria's outbursts when dealing with her suicidal ideation was taking high doses of alprazolam.

One of the most extensive testimonies came from the couple's maid, Lilia Cárdenas, who had worked for them since 1995. Cárdenas contradicted Peacock and said that it was Soria who was cold and distant, recalling Freydoz's 60th birthday, and that Soria returned from a political trip and did not greet his wife for her birthday, passing by her side and entirely ignoring her. Cárdenas said that in the months preceding the killing, Freydoz used to cry and had become so mentally unstable that one of her sons, Germán, who did not live in General Roca, had asked Soria to commit Freydoz to a mental institution for treatment. In addition to that, Cárdenas reported that Soria had agreed with his son Germán and that he was concerned about Freydoz's mental state, however not taking any decision following opposition from their other children to have their mother hospitalized against her will. Cárdenas was the only person aside Freydoz's children to visit Freydoz since her arrest and throughout her incarceration.

On 7 November 2012, the prosecution requested that Freydoz be sentenced to life in prison, considering that she had not acted under emotional distress, instead pointing to her extreme jealousy, which had included stalking Soria when he went out. One of the reasons that the state gave for the killing was that Freydoz, jealous about Soria's affair with one of his friend's daughters, was also upset with Soria's hectic weeks in politics, where he had met with President Cristina Fernández de Kirchner and planned an imminent move to Viedma to serve as Governor. Those were, according to the prosecution, an immediate cause for Freydoz to decide to kill him.

=== Sentencing ===
On 20 November 2012, the court convicted Freydoz on the count of aggravated murder by a vote of 2–1, with the partial dissent of judge María García Balduini. The two concurring judges, Carlos Gauna Kroeger and Fernando Sánchez Freytes, found that "extraordinary mitigating circumstances" had occurred at the moment of the crime as Freydoz was suffering a "jealousy drama" that prompted her to act on an impulse. Freydoz was sentenced to 18 years in prison and preemptively sent to the mental health ward at the Municipal Hospital of Cipolletti.

Judges Gauna Kroeger and Sánchez Freytes had found other important mitigating factors, including Freydoz's immediate remorse after the killing, asking for help during the trial, and her major depressive disorder as a result of her actions. Dissenting judge García Balduini voted in favor of the prosecution and argued that Soria's murder amounted to a magnicide (punishable by life imprisonment) because Freydoz had killed the "recently elected Governor whom the people [of Río Negro Province] had deposited their hopes for a good and worthy life." The presiding judge (Gauna Kroeger) ordered the Federal Penitentiary Service to preserve Freydoz's safety from reprisals or attacks by others, as well as securing that Freydoz did not evade the punishment imposed by the court.

After learning of the dissenting opinion of judge García Balduini, defense counsel Alberto Riccheri said that he would appeal the verdict, strongly criticising the judges for invoking Freydoz's refusal to testify as an argument against her. Riccheri added that Freydoz had the right to remain silent and that she did not speak because of the effects of the psychiatric treatment. He further stated that if he had not protested in court it was because he would have been held in contempt of court, but he assured that it would be easily proven that Soria's death had not been a case of magnicide but an attempted suicide that resulted in a homicide. In the same statement to the press, Riccheri criticised the emotionality of the court which, in his view, had a "desperate need" to highlight the alleged "pain of Río Negro's people" caused by Freydoz's actions.

== Incarceration and aftermath ==
Freydoz remained at the Municipal Hospital in Cipolletti until April 2013, when an upper court in General Roca ordered that she be transferred to prison and stripping her of the mental health inmate status. Upon being informed that she was due to be sent to prison, Freydoz attempted suicide on 11 April by overdosing on psychiatric medications. She was taken to the hospital in critical state and entered into a coma.

Her state worsened due to contracting pneumonia and she remained in the intensive care unit for a month. When she recovered, another court in General Roca ordered her transfer to a psychiatric hospital in Buenos Aires. That same month, a prosecutor charged some personnel of the Cipolletti Hospital with negligence for allowing Freydoz to have access to high doses of potentially lethal medications as well as not paying proper attention to a hospital report that indicated that Freydoz could hurt herself if she knew that she was going to be sent to prison instead of a mental hospital.

Following Freydoz's transfer to a private mental clinic in Almagro, Buenos Aires, her son Martín spoke to local radio in Río Negro condemning the justice system for failing to determine whether his mother was sane or insane. Soria criticized what he considered to be contradictory when detectives told him that Freydoz had to pay for the crime like "any boy who steals a radio receiver" shortly before her suicide attempt. Soria added that he did not hold contempt for the 60 medical personnel of Cipolletti Hospital accused of negligence, instead blaming the courts.

The prosecution in the Soria case appealed the verdict and requested twice that she be re-sentenced to life imprisonment. However, the request was turned down twice by the Supreme Tribunal of Río Negro and, in May 2015, the sentence of 18 years in prison was upheld and finalised by the Supreme Court.

Freydoz remained incarcerated at the Federal Penitentiary Complex in Ezeiza, Buenos Aires, until 2020, when due to health reasons she was granted house arrest at the home of a relative in her native Neuquén. In 2022, she was granted brief permits to leave the house and, in April 2023, a court in Río Negro granted her request for parole on the condition that she continued psychiatric treatment. During her time at the Ezeiza Federal Complex, Freydoz had studied and graduated in sociology and completed several work courses and capacitations which benefited her application for parole.
