= Paso Córdoba =

Coordinates: 39°03′S 67°35′W

Paso Córdova
- Municipality and village
- Interactive map of Paso Córdova
- Country: Argentina
- Province: Río Negro Province
- Time zone: UTC−3 (ART)

Paso Córdova is a village of General Roca municipality in Río Negro Province in Argentina.

On 1 January 2012, provincial First Lady Susana Freydoz shot and killed her husband, Governor Carlos Soria, on an estate in Puerto Córdoba during an argument over Soria's romantic affairs.
