= Mónica Esther Silva =

Argentine politician

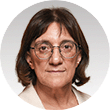

National Senator
- In office 10 December 2023 – 10 December 2025
- Constituency: Río Negro Province

Personal details
- Party: Together We Are Río Negro

Mónica Esther Silva is an Argentine politician who was a member of the Argentine Senate from 2023 to 2025.

== Biography ==
Silva holds a degree in History and serves as a professor at the National University of the South.

In August 2014, Silva was appointed Minister of Education of the Province of Río Negro under Governor Alberto Weretilneck. Prior to her appointment, she served as Director of Planning, Higher Education, and Training.

Following Weretilneck’s re-election as governor after a term in the Senate, Silva assumed his seat in the Argentine Senate in April 2023.

== See also ==
- List of Argentine deputies, 2023–2025
