= Martín Soria =

Argentine lawyer and politician

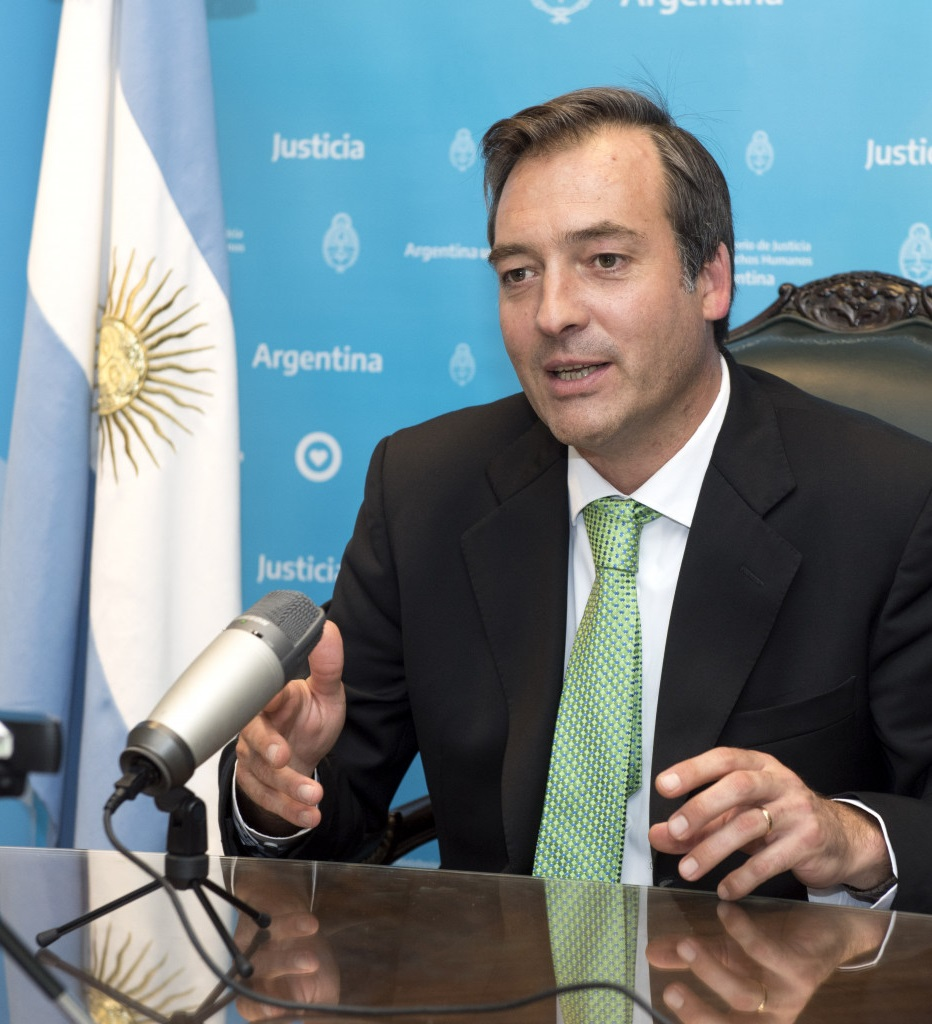

National Deputy
- Incumbent
- Assumed office 10 December 2023
- Constituency: Río Negro
- In office 10 December 2019 – 27 March 2021
- Constituency: Río Negro

Minister of Justice and Human Rights
- In office 29 March 2021 – 10 December 2023
- President: Alberto Fernández
- Preceded by: Marcela Losardo
- Succeeded by: Mariano Cúneo Libarona

Mayor of General Roca
- In office 10 December 2011 – 10 December 2019
- Preceded by: Carlos Soria
- Succeeded by: María Emilia Soria

Personal details
- Born: 15 December 1975 (age 50) General Roca, Río Negro Province, Argentina
- Party: Justicialist Party
- Other political affiliations: Frente de Todos (2019–2023); Union for the Homeland (2023–present)
- Parent(s): Carlos Soria and Susana Freydoz
- Education: University of Buenos Aires

Martín Ignacio Soria (Spanish pronunciation: [maɾˈtin iɣˈnasjo ˈsoɾja]; born 15 December 1975) is an Argentine lawyer and politician, who served as a Minister of Justice and Human Rights of Argentina from 29 March 2021 to 10 December 2023. Having previously served as a member of the Argentine Chamber of Deputies elected in Río Negro Province, Soria was designated to succeed Marcela Losardo following her resignation.

Soria previously served as intendente (mayor) of his hometown of General Roca from 2011 to 2019, succeeding his father Carlos Soria and preceding his sister, María Emilia Soria. He belongs to the Justicialist Party.

In 2023, he was once again elected to the Chamber of Deputies for the Union for the Homeland coalition.

== Electoral history ==
=== Executive ===
Electoral history of Martín Soria
| Election | Office | List | Votes | | | Result | Ref. |
| Election | Office | List | Total | % | P. | Result | Ref. |
|---|---|---|---|---|---|---|---|
| 2011 | Mayor of General Roca | Front for Victory | 32,430 | 64.93% | 1st | Elected | |
| 2015 | Mayor of General Roca | Front for Victory | 36,337 | 71.23% | 1st | Elected | |
| 2019 | Governor of Río Negro | Front for Victory | 136,170 | 34.97% | 2nd | Not elected | |

=== Legislative ===
Electoral history of Martín Soria
| Election | Office | List | # | District | Votes | | | Result | Ref. |
| Election | Office | List | # | District | Total | % | P. | Result | Ref. |
|---|---|---|---|---|---|---|---|---|---|
| 2019 | National Deputy | Frente de Todos | 1 | Río Negro Province | 170,935 | 45.10% | 1st (Note: Presented on an electoral list. The data shown represents the share of the vote the entire party/alliance received in that constituency.) | Elected | |
| 2023 | National Deputy | Union for the Homeland | 1 | Río Negro Province | 134,429 | 32.84% | 1st | Elected | |

Political offices
| Preceded by Carlos Soria | Mayor of General Roca; 2011–2019 | Succeeded by María Emilia Soria |
| Preceded by Marcela Losardo | Minister of Justice and Human Rights; 2021–2023 | Succeeded by Mariano Cúneo Libarona |
