= Massaccesi =

Massaccesi (or Massacessi) is an Italian surname. Notable people with the surname include:

- Aristide Massaccesi (1936–1999), Italian filmmaker known professionally as Joe D'Amato
- Horacio Massaccesi (born 1948), Argentine politician
- Pedro Massacessi (born 1966), Argentine retired footballer
