= Miguel Ángel Pichetto =

Argentine lawyer and politician

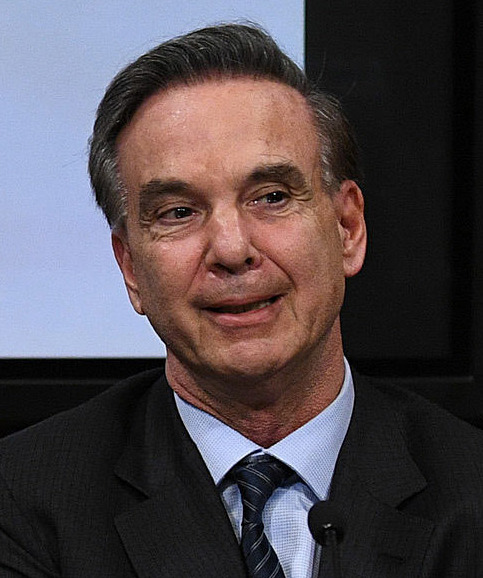
- Pichetto in 2018

National Deputy
- Incumbent
- Assumed office 10 December 2023
- Constituency: Buenos Aires

National Senator
- In office 10 December 2001 – 10 December 2019
- Constituency: Río Negro

Councillor of Magistracy
- In office 10 December 1993 – 10 December 1997
- Appointed by: Chamber of Deputies

National Deputy
- In office 10 December 1993 – 10 December 1997
- Constituency: Río Negro

Provincial Deputy of Río Negro
- In office 10 December 1987 – 10 December 1993
- Constituency: San Antonio

Mayor of Sierra Grande
- In office 10 December 1985 – 10 December 1987
- Preceded by: Beluz González
- Succeeded by: Hugo Lastra

President of Encuentro Republicano Federal
- Incumbent
- Assumed office 11 March 2021

Personal details
- Born: 24 October 1950 (age 75) Banfield, Buenos Aires Province, Argentina
- Party: Justicialist Party (1983–2020); Encuentro Republicano Federal (2021–present)
- Other political affiliations: FREJUPO (1989–1995); Front for Victory (2003–2015); Juntos por el Cambio (2019–2023); Hacemos Federal Coalition (2023-present)
- Spouse: María Teresa Minassian
- Education: National University of La Plata
- Profession: Lawyer, Politician

Miguel Ángel Pichetto (born 24 October 1950) is an Argentine lawyer and conservative Peronist politician. He is Auditor General of the Nation. He was National Senator for Río Negro Province for eighteen years and was the vice-presidential candidate of Juntos por el Cambio in the 2019 general election.

Ideologically, he considers himself a Peronist, republican and capitalist, while also an admirer of Julio Argentino Roca and Carlos Saúl Menem administrations.

== Biography ==
Pichetto was born in Banfield, Buenos Aires. He earned a law degree at the National University of La Plata in 1976 and relocated to Río Negro Province, where he served as counsel for Hierro Patagónico Sierra Grande, a pig iron smelter, and for the Provincial Government.

== Political career ==
He was elected to the Sierra Grande City Council in 1983, and in 1985 became mayor of the city, serving until 1987. Pichetto married María Teresa Minassian, with whom he had two children.

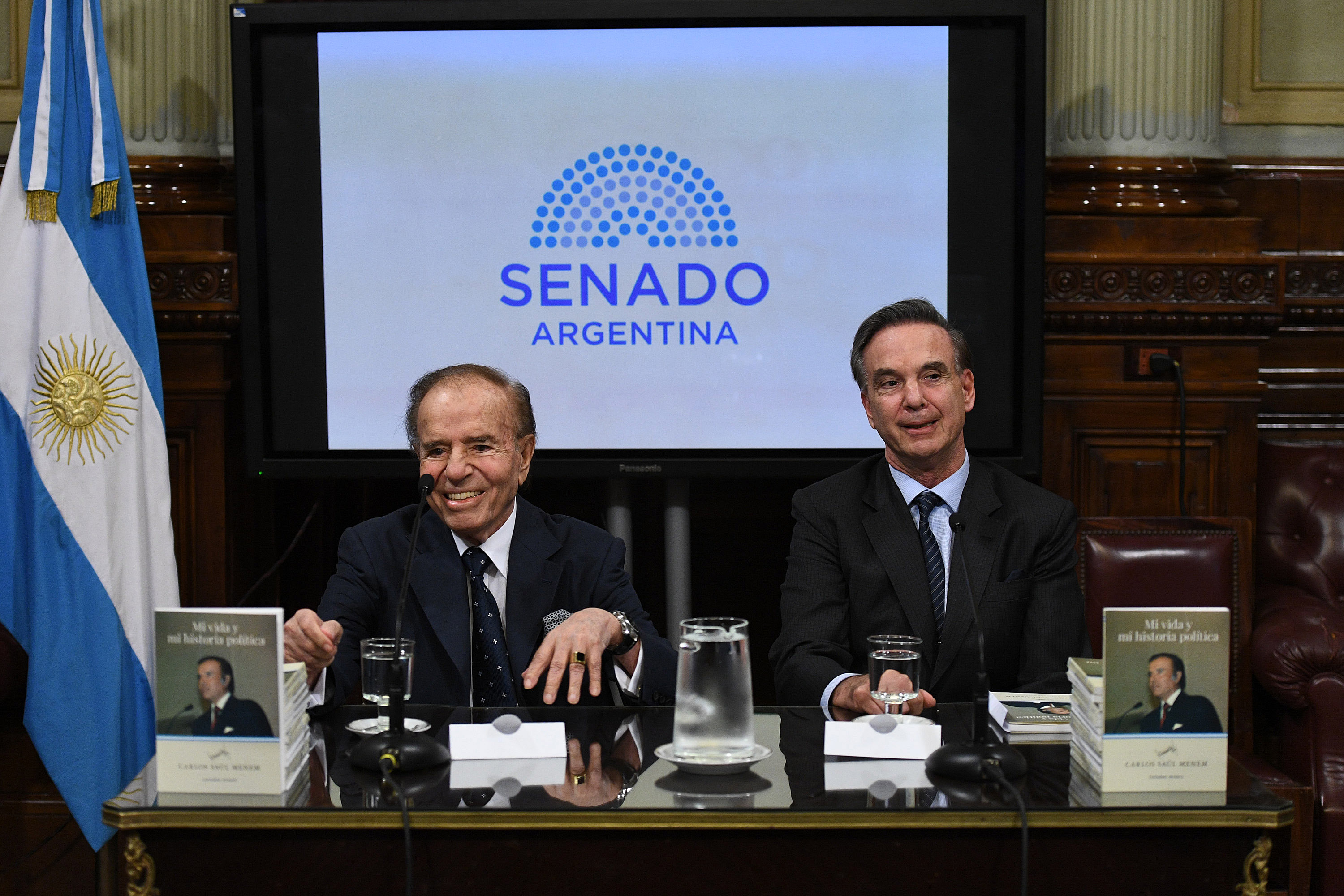
Pichetto with his friend, Carlos Menem

Pichetto was elected to the Provincial Assembly in 1988, and was re-elected in 1991. He was named president of the Río Negro Province chapter of the PJ, and was elected to the Argentine Chamber of Deputies in 1993. He was named vice-president of the Justicialist caucus in the Lower House in 1997; elections that year resulted in steep losses for the PJ, and Pichetto was not re-elected to a second term. Throughout his career he was a "disciplined" party man, and supported President Carlos Menem's neo-liberal break from the traditionally populist PJ platform during the 1990s. Pichetto took a leading role on legal, justice and penal matters and was appointed to the Council of Magistracy of the Nation, the senior justice advisory body, in 1998, and re-elected in 2001. He sat on the committees on prosecution, the appointment of judges and judicial school, and later chaired the disciplinary committee, and served on the administration and finance committees.

Pichetto was elected senator in 2001, his term ending in 2007. He was elected President of the PJ caucus in the Senate on December 30, 2002, and despite his earlier support for the more conservative Menem, became a prominent Kirchnerist. He thus joined the center-left Front for Victory faction of the PJ in support of President Néstor Kirchner.

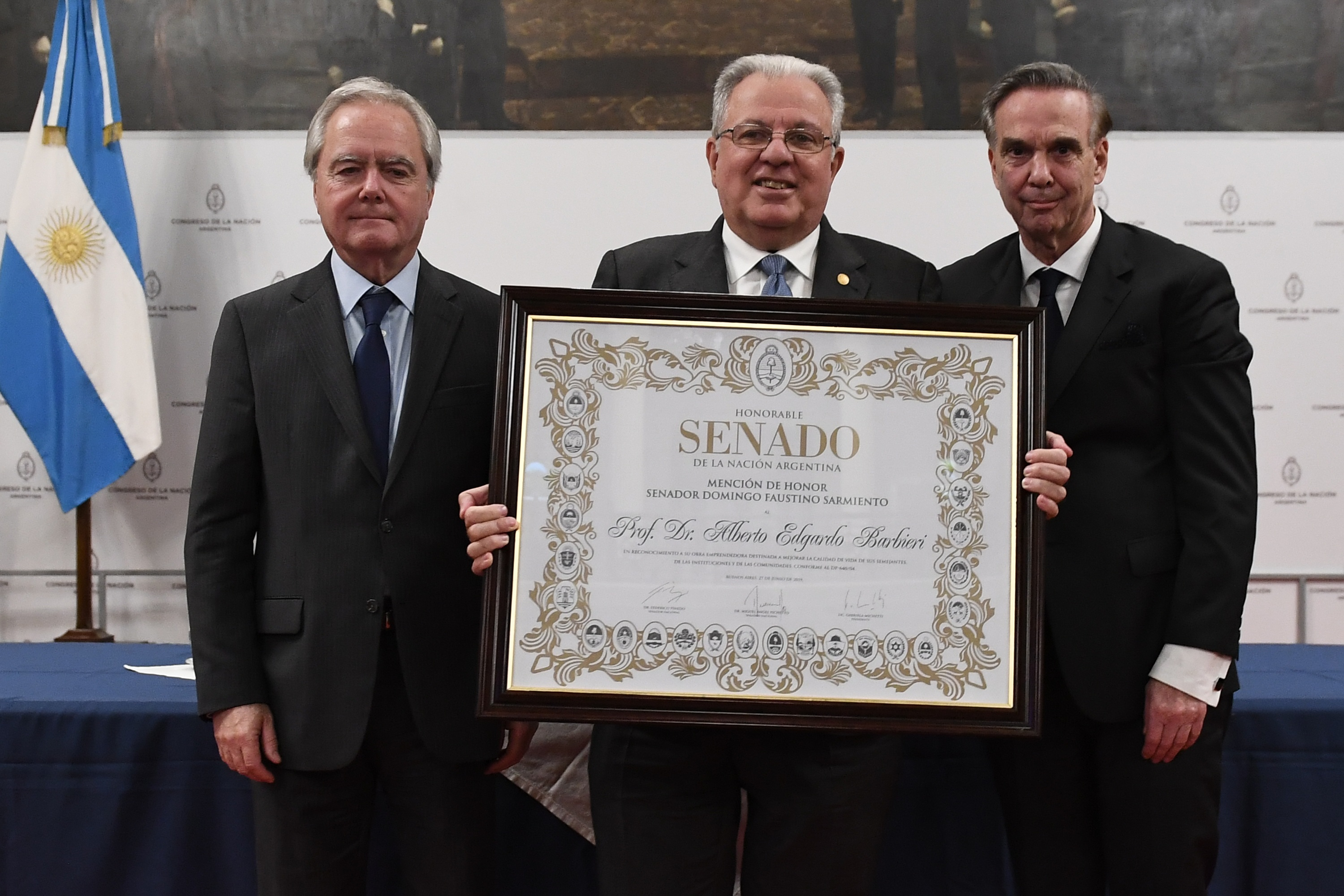
Pichetto, Federico Pinedo and the rector of UBA

Pichetto campaigned for governor of Río Negro Province in the 2007 elections. There was some doubt as to whether Kirchner would support fellow Peronist Pichetto, or the incumbent UCR governor, Miguel Saiz, who was a leading supporter of Kirchner from (the opposition) UCR ranks. Kirchner ultimately kept out of the provincial elections, and Pichetto lost to Saiz.

Pichetto was re-elected to the Senate that year, however. He retained a key role in the passage of numerous Kirchnerist initiatives through the Senate, though differences arose with President Cristina Fernández de Kirchner over his support of the Law of the Protection of Glaciers in 2010: he was among those who voted for the bill, which passed on September 30 and was later vetoed by the president. Pichetto also objected to the president's support of Río Negro Governor Miguel Saiz of the UCR (to whom he lost in 2007). These differences cost Pichetto clout in the Senate among fellow Kirchnerists, and contributed to the president's decision against endorsing Pichetto as the PJ candidate for governor in 2011; Carlos Soria won the nomination instead, and was ultimately elected governor.

The untimely death of Governor Soria in January 2012 enhanced Pichetto's role in Río Negro politics. He was appointed president of the Río Negro PJ, and his son, Juan Manuel Pichetto, was appointed Minister of Production in the horticulture-rich province - becoming thought of by opponents as a "shadow governor" to Soria's successor, Alberto Weretilneck.

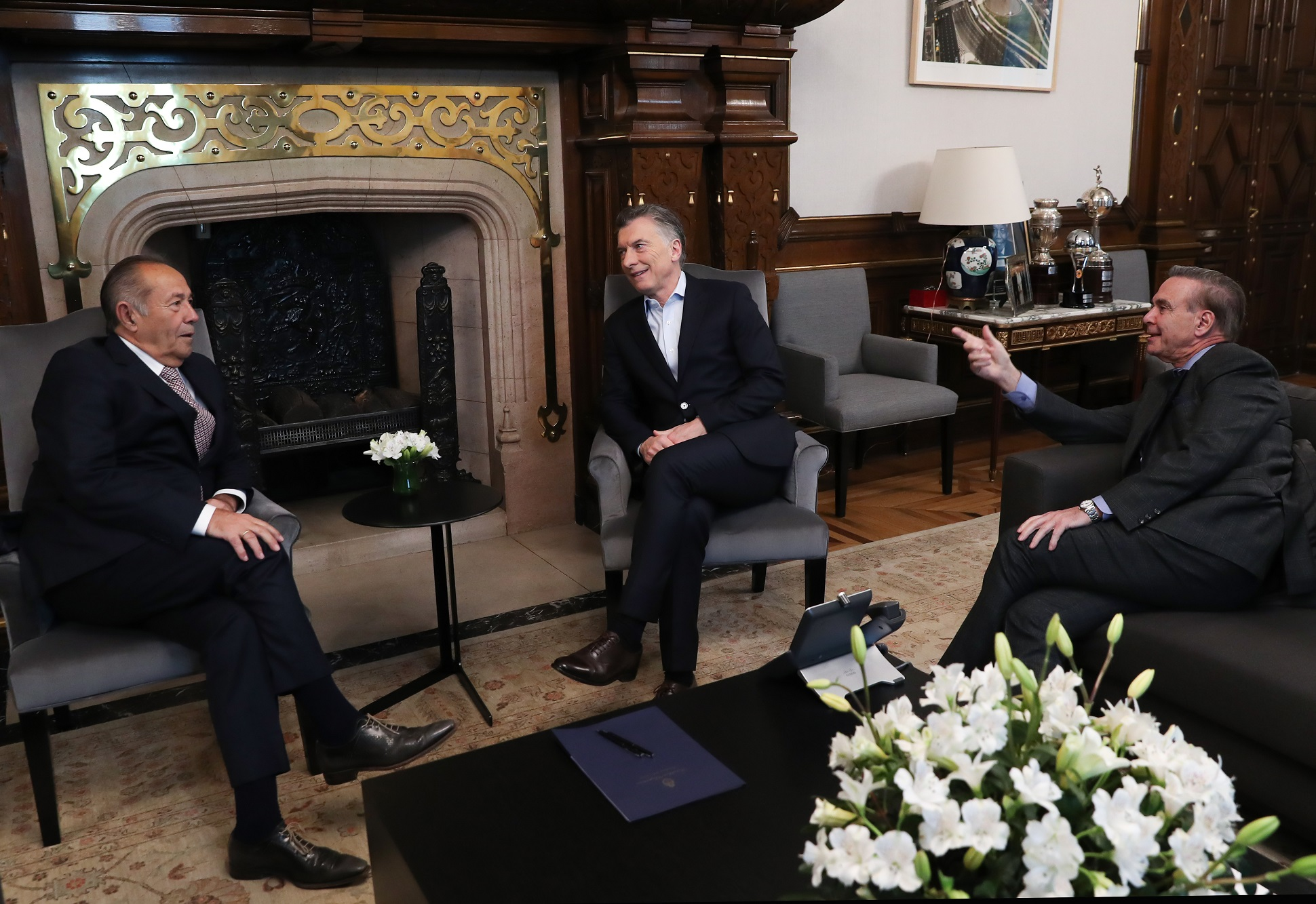
Pichetto with Macri and Adolfo Rodríguez Saá

From his bench Pichetto accompanied the main projects of the government of Cristina Fernández de Kirchner, such as resolution 125, the nationalization of the AFJP and the media law.

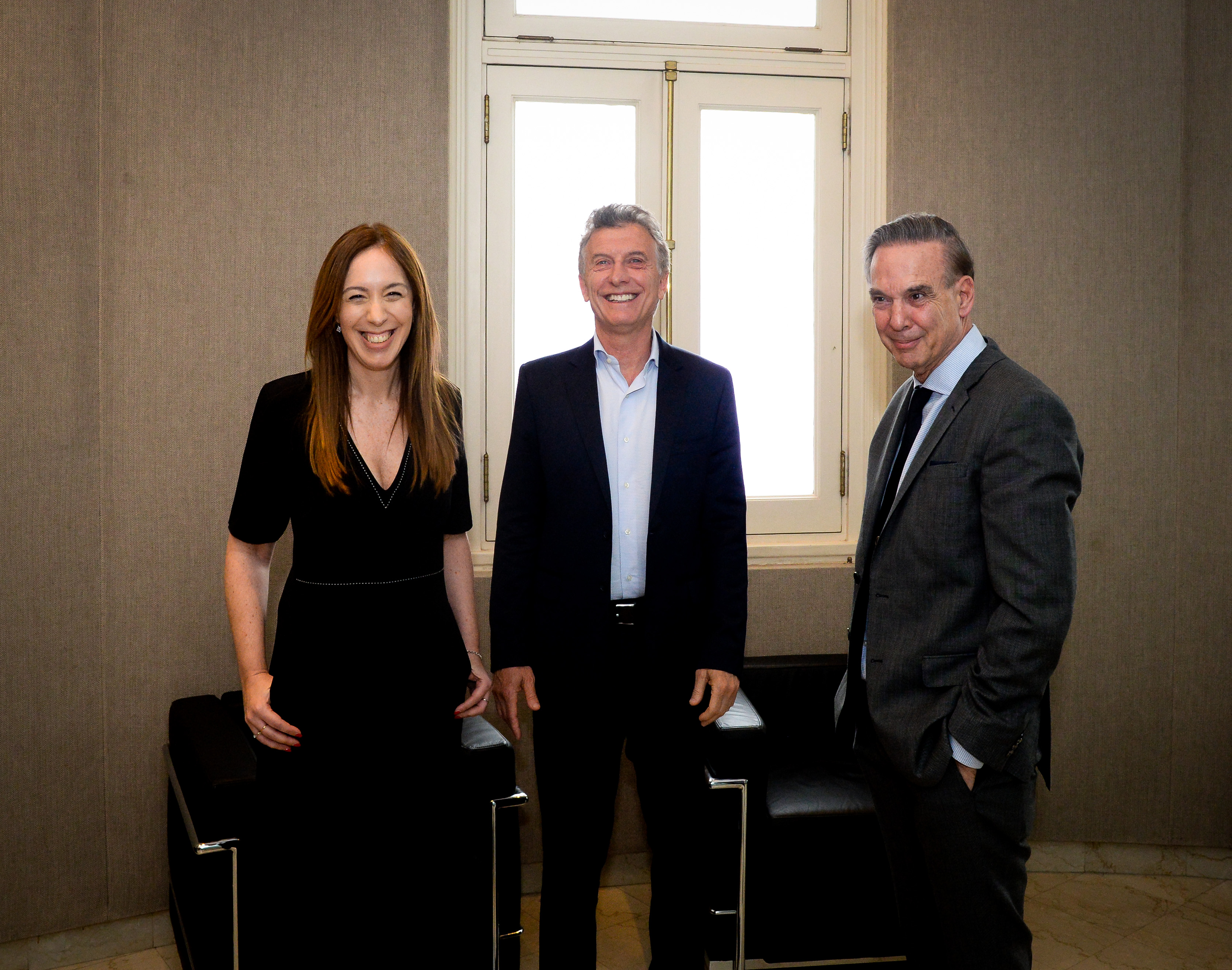
Pichetto with Macri and Vidal. In 2019 he joined the government and Juntos por el Cambio.

After Mauricio Macri assumed the presidency in 2015, Pichetto accompanied several of the legislative projects of the new management. One of them was the voluntary payment of US$9.3 billion to the vulture funds, which would allow him to leave the country of the default in which he was. He also supported the pension reform carried out in 2017. The interior minister, Rogelio Frigerio, highlighted the role of Pichetto, since it has been fundamental for the approval of more than 200 laws favorable to the government of Cambiemos.

In 2020 Pichetto formally left the Justicialist Party (of which he had been a member since 1983) and joined the UNIR Constitutional Nationalist Party, also announcing his intention to create a new national political party in 2021.
