= Together We Are Río Negro =

Argentine political party

Together We Are Río Negro Juntos Somos Río Negro
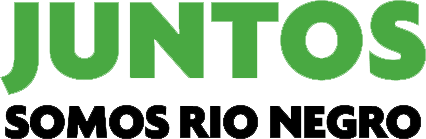
- Leader: Alberto Weretilneck
- Founded: 2015; 11 years ago
- Headquarters: Ceferino Namuncurá 124, Viedma, Río Negro
- Membership (2017): 4,126
- Ideology: Regionalism; Río Negro integration Factions: Peronism
- Political position: Big tent
- Argentine Chamber of Deputies (Río Negro seats): 2 / 5
- Argentine Senate (Río Negro seats): 1 / 3
- Seats in the Río Negro Legislature: 28 / 46

Website
- Official website

Together We Are Río Negro (Spanish: Juntos Somos Río Negro; JSRN) is a provincial political party in the Río Negro Province of Argentina. It was formed in 2015 as an electoral coalition to back the candidacy to the governorship of incumbent Alberto Weretilneck; it was later officially registered as a political party.

Members of the original coalition formed in 2015 included the provincial chapters of the Broad Front, the Victory Party and the Faith Party, and provincial parties such as the Patagonic People's Movement. It currently holds a majority of seats in the provincial legislature and the incumbent and former governors, Weretilneck and Arabela Carreras, belong to JSRN. In addition, the party has representation at the federal level in both chambers of the National Congress, with Mónica Esther Silva serving in the Senate and Agustín Domingo serving in the Chamber of Deputies, both since 2023.

== Electoral results ==
=== Chamber of Deputies ===
Election year	Votes	%	seats won	total seats	position	presidency
2019	121,478	32.05 (#2nd)	1	1 / 3	Minority	Alberto Fernández (PJ—FDT)
2021	140,634	37.30 (#1st)	1	1 / 2	Minority	Alberto Fernández (PJ—FDT)

=== Senate ===
Election year	Votes	%	seats won	total seats	position	presidency
2019	153,338	45.51 (#2nd)	1	1 / 3	Minority	Alberto Fernández (PJ—FDT)

=== Río Negro governorship ===
Election year	Candidate	# of overall votes	% of overall vote	Result
2015	Alberto Weretilneck	192,562	52.80 (1st)	✓ Elected
2019	Arabela Carreras	204,920	52.64 (1st)	✓ Elected

=== Río Negro provincial legislature ===
Election year	Circuit vote			Population vote			total seats	position
Election year	Votes	%	seats won	Votes	%	seats won	total seats	position
2015	174,084	48.33 (#1st)	12 / 22	169,947	47.31 (#1st)	14 / 24	26 / 46	Majority
2019	199,389	51.68 (#1st)	13 / 22	196,025	51.92 (#1st)	15 / 24	28 / 46	Majority
