= Arabela Carreras =

Argentine politician (born 1970)

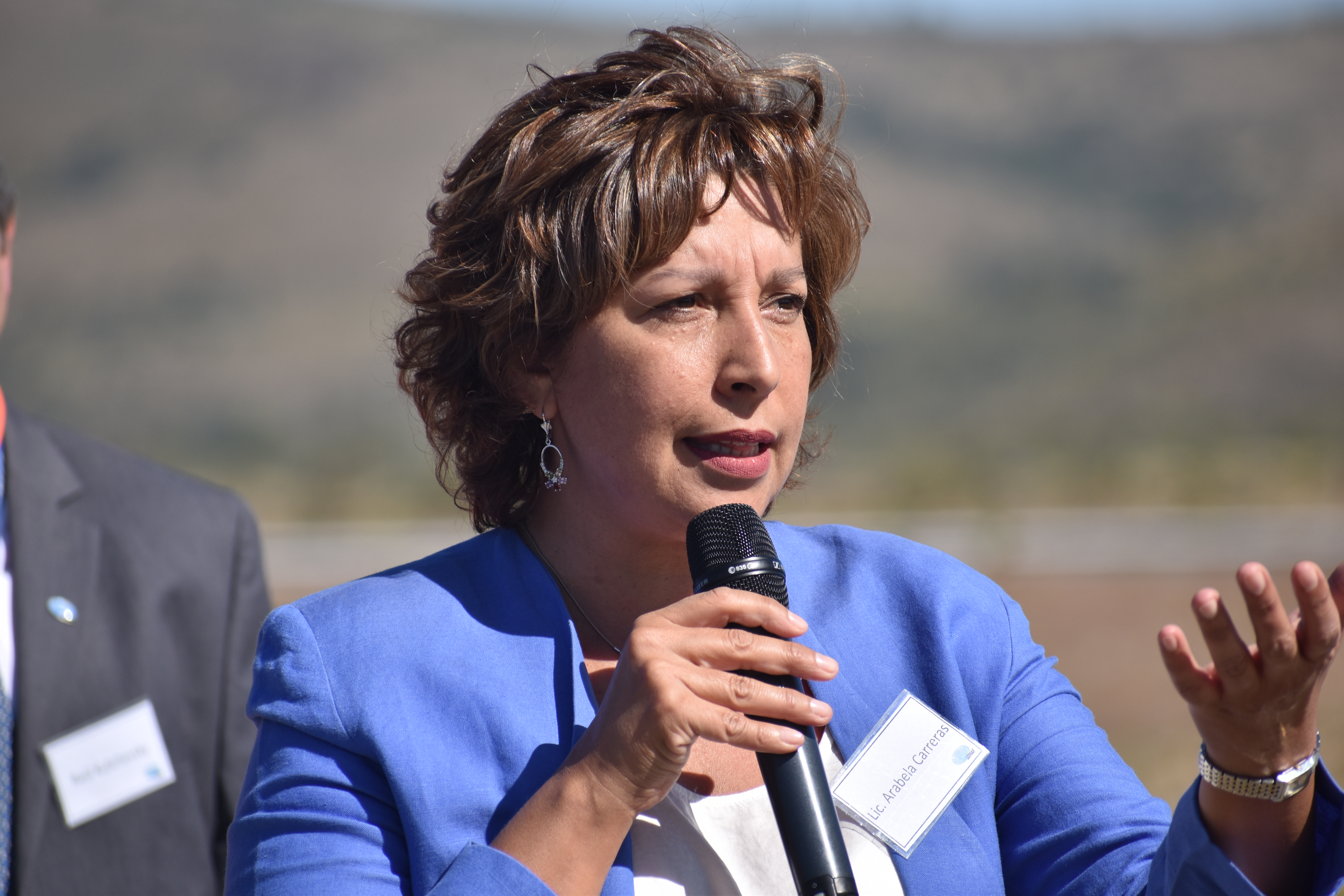

Governor of Río Negro
- In office 10 December 2019 – 10 December 2023
- Vice Governor: Alejandro Palmieri
- Preceded by: Alberto Weretilneck
- Succeeded by: Alberto Weretilneck

Minister of Tourism, Culture and Sports of Río Negro
- In office 20 September 2017 – 15 February 2019
- Governor: Alberto Weretilneck
- Preceded by: Silvina Arrieta
- Succeeded by: Daniel Sanguinetti

Provincial Legislator of Río Negro
- In office 10 December 2011 – 20 September 2017
- Constituency: Provincial list

Personal details
- Born: 21 January 1970 (age 56) Bariloche, Argentina
- Party: Together We Are Río Negro
- Other political affiliations: Front for Victory (2004–2011)
- Education: National University of Córdoba

Arabela Marisa Carreras (born 21 January 1970) is an Argentine teacher and politician. She was Governor of Río Negro Province since from 2019 to 2023, the first woman to hold the post. From 2017 to 2019 she was the province's Minister of Tourism, Culture and Sports. She also served as a provincial legislator and as councilwoman in her hometown, San Carlos de Bariloche.

== Early life and education ==
Arabela Marisa Carreras was born on 21 January 1970 in San Carlos de Bariloche, Río Negro Province. She studied modern literature at the National University of Córdoba, graduating with a licenciatura. From 1996 to 2007 she worked as a high school teacher.

== Political career ==
Carreras's political career began in the municipality of her native Bariloche under the mayoralty of Alberto Icaré. In 2006, when the city reformed its constitutional charter, Carreras was a constituent of the convention, which she presided. She represented the SUR-Front for Victory alliance. In 2007, she was elected councilwoman of the city. In 2011 she was elected to the provincial legislature in the Front for Victory ticket. Early in her tenure at the Legislature she supported the derogation of an "anti-cyanide" mining regulation, which prompted criticism and protests in Bariloche. In 2014 she reversed her opinion, and instead proposed holding a binding referendum in the province to settle whether to limit surface mining in Río Negro or not.

From 2015 to 2017 she was the provincial executive's representative to the Río Negro Council of Magistracy. In 2017 she was appointed as the provinces Minister of Tourism, Culture and Sports by Governor Alberto Weretilneck.

Ahead of the 2019 general election, Carreras was nominated as Juntos Somos Río Negro's – Weretilneck's political alliance – candidate to the governorship. She won the election with over 50% of the vote.

Political offices
Preceded by Alberto Weretilneck	Governor of Río Negro; 2019–2023	Succeeded by Alberto Weretilneck
