= Osvaldo Álvarez Guerrero =

Argentine politician (1940–2008)

National Deputy
- In office 10 December 1987 – 10 December 1991
- Constituency: Río Negro
- In office 25 May 1973 – 23 March 1976
- Constituency: Río Negro

Governor of Río Negro
- In office 10 December 1983 – 10 December 1987
- Preceded by: Carlos Fernando San Juan (as de facto Federal Interventor)
- Succeeded by: Horacio Massaccesi

Personal details
- Born: 1940 Florida, Buenos Aires Province, Argentina
- Died: Buenos Aires, Argentina 27 July 2008 (aged 67–68)
- Party: Radical Civic Union

Osvaldo Álvarez Guerrero (1940 – 27 July 2008) was an Argentine Radical Civic Union (UCR) politician. He served as Governor of Río Negro Province and as a National Deputy.

Born in Florida (a suburb of Buenos Aires, Álvarez Guerrero joined the Radical Civic Union of the People (UCRP, the more conservative faction led by Ricardo Balbín) in 1958 in his home town of Vicente López, a neighboring community. He became a lawyer and relocated to Viedma, in Río Negro Province, in 1964. UCR Governor Carlos Nielsen appointed him subsecretary of social affairs, serving in that post until the military coup of 28 June 1966 which toppled President Arturo Illia. That year he moved to San Carlos de Bariloche, where he practiced as a lawyer, taught philosophy and wrote for newspapers including La Nación and Diario Río Negro. He later wrote several books, particularly on political history.

Upon the return of democracy, Álvarez Guerrero helped relaunch the UCR in Río Negro and was a leading player in the national internal Radical movement of Raúl Alfonsín and Conrado Storani. In 1973 he became President of the provincial committee of the UCR and was elected to the Argentine Chamber of Deputies. Following the coup of 1976, he was arrested and 'disappeared' for 72 hours, being released following protests by his party, including former President Illia, although he lost his passport and the right to leave the country.

In October 1983, following the return of democracy, Álvarez Guerrero was elected governor of Río Negro with 63% of the vote. He was a staunch federalist and a prime mover behind attempts to move the Argentine federal capital to Viedma. He was returned to the Chamber of Deputies in 1987. Álvarez Guerrero was elected first vice-president of the National Committee of the UCR in 1989, and in 1991 he became President of the National Convention.

He became a vocal critic of the 1993 Olivos Pact between UCR leader Raúl Alfonsín and President Carlos Menem (of the opposition Justicialist Party), and opposed the subsequent 1994 reform of the Argentine Constitution, resigning in 1994 over the nomination of his successor as governor, Horacio Massaccesi, as UCR candidate for president. He took part in the launch of the center-left ARI, although he distanced himself when his fellow activists left the UCR.
