= María Emilia Soria =

Argentine lawyer and politician

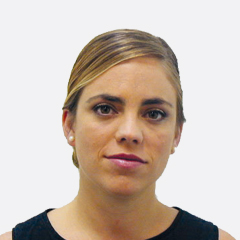

Mayor of General Roca
- Incumbent
- Assumed office 10 December 2019
- Preceded by: Martín Soria

National Deputy
- In office 10 December 2013 – 10 December 2019
- Constituency: Río Negro

Personal details
- Born: 20 July 1985 (age 41) General Roca, Río Negro, Argentina
- Party: Justicialist Party
- Other political affiliations: Front for Victory (2013–2017); Frente de Todos (2019–present)
- Education: Argentine Catholic University

María Emilia Soria (born 20 July 1985) is an Argentine lawyer and politician, currently serving as intendenta (mayor) of General Roca, Río Negro. She belongs to the Justicialist Party.

Soria previously served as a National Deputy elected in Río Negro Province from 2013 to 2019. She is the daughter of former Río Negro governor Carlos Soria and Susana Freydoz, and sister of former General Roca mayor Martín Soria.

== Early life and education ==
Soria was born on 20 July 1985 in General Roca, Río Negro, only daughter of Carlos Ernesto Soria and Susana Freydoz. She has three brothers: Martín, Germán, and Carlos. María Emilia studied law at the Pontifical Catholic University of Argentina (UCA), graduating in 2010. Before entering politics, she worked at a private law firm in General Roca and at the Alto Valle state attorney's office.

== Political career ==
Soria ran for one of Río Negro's seats in the National Chamber of Deputies in the 2013 legislative election, as the first candidate in the Front for Victory list. With 50.76% of the vote, the FPV was the most voted list in the province, and Soria was easily elected. During her first term as deputy, she formed part of the parliamentary commissions on Justice, Agriculture and Livestock, Family and Women, Freedom of Expression, and Natural Resources.

She was re-elected for a second term in 2017, again as the first candidate in the FPV list, which received 49.36% of the vote. In October 2017, she voted in favour of stripping Julio De Vido of his parliamentary immunity, going against most of the FPV bloc. She also voted against the Mauricio Macri administration's 2017 pension reform. Soria was a supporter of the legalisation of abortion, voting in favour of the 2018 Voluntary Termination of Pregnancy Bill.

In 2019, she ran for the mayoralty of General Roca, and won with 56.12% of the vote. She is the city's first female mayor. She succeeded her brother, Martín, who had served as mayor since 2011. María Emilia and Martín's father, Carlos Soria, had served as mayor from 2003 to 2011. Her vacant seat in the Chamber of Deputies was filled by Ayelén Spósito.

== Personal life ==
Soria is married and has two children. In 2012, she rose to prominence during the trial of her mother for her father's murder, a case which drew national attention.

Political offices
| Preceded by Martín Soria | Mayor of General Roca; 2019–present | Succeeded by Incumbent |
