= Alejo Tabares =

Argentine footballer

Personal information
- Full name: Alejo Germán Tabares
- Date of birth: 20 June 2001 (age 25)
- Place of birth: General Roca, Argentina
- Height: 1.79 m (5 ft 10 in)
- Position: Left-back

Team information
- Current team: All Boys
- Number: 11

Youth career
- Cimac
- Deportivo Roca
- 2018–2020: Lanús

Senior career*
Years	Team	Apps	(Gls)
2020–2022	Lanús	2	(0)
2022–2024	Estudiantes RC	0	(0)
2022–2023	→ Cipolletti (loan)	30	(0)
2024–	All Boys	40	(1)
2025	→ Newell's Old Boys (loan)	14	(0)

International career
2019	Argentina U18		
- * Club domestic league appearances and goals as of 17:37, 17 March 2026 (UTC)

Alejo Germán Tabares (born 20 June 2001) is an Argentine professional footballer who plays as a left-back for All Boys.

== Club career ==
Tabares started out in the youth ranks at Cimac, which preceded a move to Deportivo Roca. In 2018, Tabares headed to Lanús. He made the breakthrough into their first-team squad towards the end of 2020, scoring in a friendly against Arsenal de Sarandí before appearing as an unused substitute for defeats to Boca Juniors and São Paulo in early November. Later that month, on 25 November, Tabares made his senior debut in a Copa Sudamericana round of sixteen, first leg defeat to Bolívar; replacing José Sand with minutes remaining at the Estadio Hernando Siles.

On 28 January 2022, Tabares joined Primera Nacional club Estudiantes de Río Cuarto.

== International career ==
Tabares represented Argentina's U18s at the 2019 COTIF Tournament in Spain.

== Career statistics ==
As of 26 November 2020.

Appearances and goals by club, season and competition
Club	Season	League			Cup		League Cup		Continental		Other		Total	
Club	Season	Division	Apps	Goals	Apps	Goals	Apps	Goals	Apps	Goals	Apps	Goals	Apps	Goals
Lanús	2020–21 (Note: Soccerway counts Copa de la Liga Profesional appearances as league appearances.)	Primera División	0	0	0	0	0	0	1 (Note: Appearance(s) in the Copa Sudamericana)	0	0	0	1	0
Career total			0	0	0	0	0	0	1	0	0	0	1	0
