= Ramallo massacre =

Argentinian bank robbery

Coordinates: 33°30′0.5″S 60°3′55.5″W

The Ramallo massacre (Spanish: Masacre de Ramallo) occurred on September 17, 1999, in Villa Ramallo, in northern Buenos Aires Province, Argentina, when three armed robbers broke into the local offices of the Banco de la Nación Argentina, taking six hostages. After several hours, they tried to escape in a car, using the bank manager and an accountant as human shields, and holding the manager's wife. A few meters ahead, a special group of the provincial police, the GEO, killed one of the suspects and the two hostages.

Another suspect, Martín Saldaña, was found hanged in his cell just hours after the massacre; though it was assumed that he had committed suicide, in January 2007 new findings indicated that he had been murdered, possibly by first hitting him on the head and then strangling him.

Doubts about police behaviour arose after the whole country saw footage of the police special unit deliberately shooting the car with hostages inside. The GEO was dissolved in the aftermath by Eduardo Duhalde.

After the massacre, several government officials blamed the media coverage for the tragic outcome, accusing journalists of an unprofessional treatment of the news. The provincial governor Eduardo Duhalde claimed that negotiations may have been negatively affected by the police constant communication with radio and television reporters.

On October 17, 1999, Secretary of Justice and Security Buenos Aires Carlos Soria confirmed that police had acted as accomplices of the thieves who robbed the National Bank of Villa Ramallo, a fact which preceded the slaughter of two hostages and a criminal during the escape attempt. "There is, unfortunately, and as we all imagined, some police personnel directly involved," Soria told Radio América, Télam reported.

In 2002, the surviving assailant and six accomplices were sentenced at trial. In 2004, two police officers were sentenced for killing two of the hostages.

== See also ==
- List of massacres in Argentina
