= Agustín Domingo =

Argentine politician

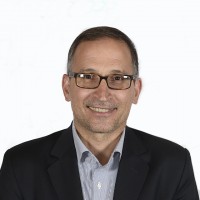

Member of the Chamber of Deputies of Argentina
- Incumbent
- Assumed office 10 December 2021
- Constituency: Río Negro Province

Personal details
- Born: May 8, 1973 (age 52)
- Party: Together We Are Río Negro
- Occupation: Accountant

Agustín Domingo is an Argentine politician who is a member of the Chamber of Deputies of Argentina.

== Biography ==
He worked as an accountant before being elected to the Chamber of Deputies in 2021.
