= Alberto Weretilneck =

Argentine politician

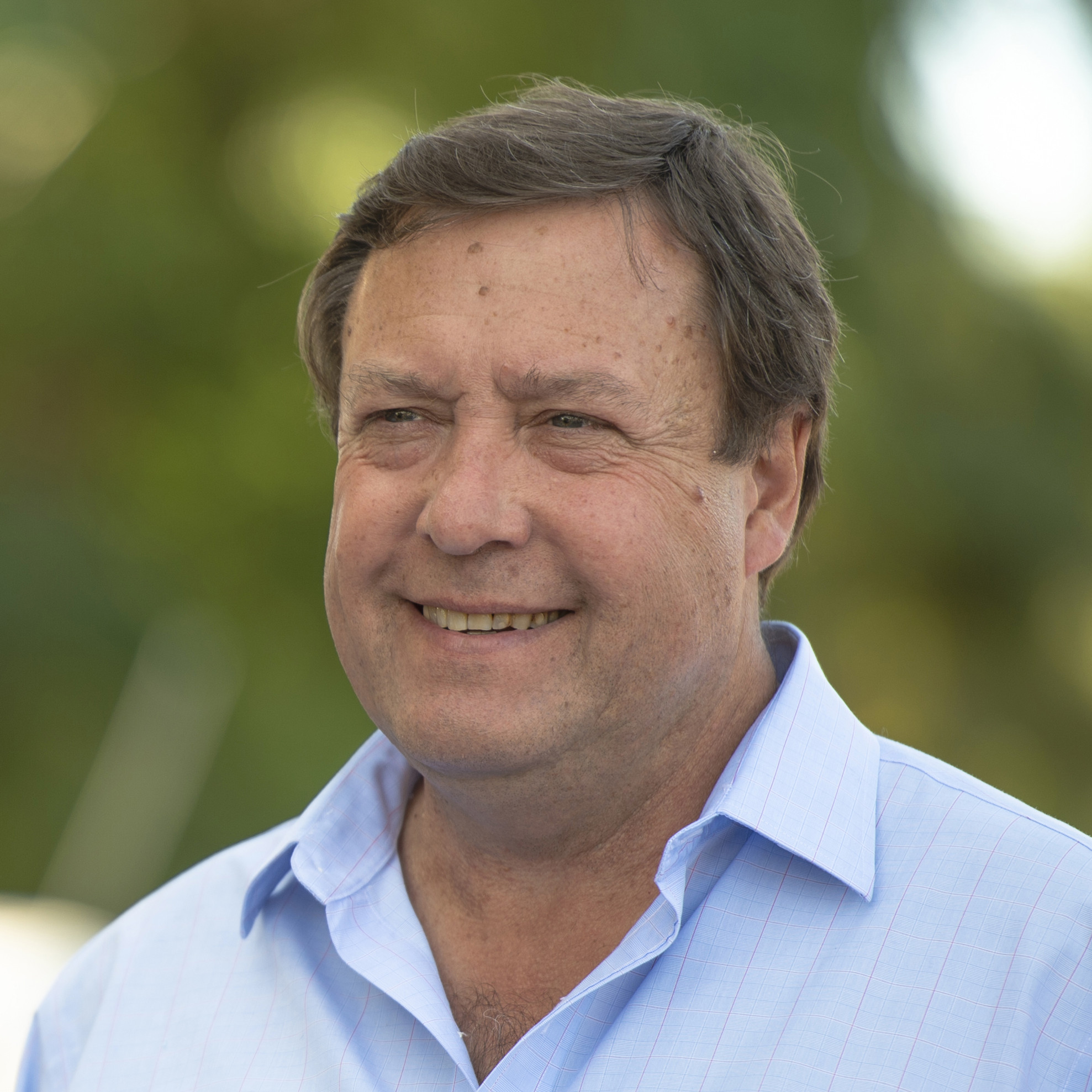

Governor of Río Negro
- Incumbent
- Assumed office 10 December 2023
- Vice Governor: Pedro Oscar Pesatti
- Preceded by: Arabela Carreras
- In office 1 January 2012 – 10 December 2019
- Vice Governor: Carlos Peralta (2012–2014); Pedro Pesatti (2014–2019)
- Preceded by: Carlos Soria
- Succeeded by: Arabela Carreras

National Senator
- In office 10 December 2019 – 10 December 2023
- Constituency: Río Negro

Vice Governor of Río Negro
- In office 10 December 2011 – 1 January 2012
- Governor: Carlos Soria
- Preceded by: Bautista Mendioroz
- Succeeded by: Ana Piccinini

Mayor of Cipolletti
- In office 10 December 2007 – 7 December 2011
- Preceded by: Julio Arriaga
- Succeeded by: Abel Baratti

Personal details
- Born: 11 October 1962 (age 64) El Bolsón, Río Negro Province, Argentina
- Party: Together We Are Río Negro (since 2015); Broad Front (until 2014)

Alberto Weretilneck (born 11 October 1962) is an Argentine politician currently serving as governor of Río Negro Province since 2023. He previously held the same position from 2012 to 2019.

From 2019 to 2023, he was a Senator for Río Negro, and he served as intendente (mayor) of Cipolletti from 2007 to 2011.

== Biography ==
Born in El Bolsón, Río Negro, he joined the center-left Broad Front, and was elected mayor of Cipolletti, Río Negro Province, in 2007. He became a supporter of Kirchnerism and was elected Vicegovernor in 2011; he was also named Vice President of the Broad Front on 17 December, serving with Adriana Puiggrós.

Weretilneck joined Justicialist Party nominee Carlos Soria in December 2010 as his running mate for the 2011 gubernatorial campaign; while they belonged to different parties, their coalition was endorsed by both Weretilneck's Broad Front and President Cristina Kirchner's Front for Victory (which headed the Justicialist Party). Elected with Soria that September in a landslide, Weretilneck became governor on 1 January 2012, after the killing of Soria by his own wife Susana Freydoz, who shot him in the face after an argument over Soria's infidelities and affair with a much younger woman.

Weretilneck's administration worked closely with the opposition UCR in the Provincial Legislature, while also participating in housing plans funded by the Federal Government which allowed the construction of 2,600 homes. During his first term the Viedma Riverwalk was built, as well as the repavement of Routes 3 and 251 (which serve the province's remote southern half). He also inaugurated 22 new primary schools and extended the school; among the new schools opened was the Lucerinta Cañumil Elementary School, the first officially bilingual Mapudungun/Spanish school in the province.

Governor Weretilneck was comfortably reelected to a second term in 2015. His Juntos Somos Río Negro (Together We Are Río Negro) alliance defeated the Front for Victory (FpV) candidate, Senator Miguel Ángel Pichetto, by 53% to 34%.
