= Governor of Río Negro Province =

- Provincial coat of arms

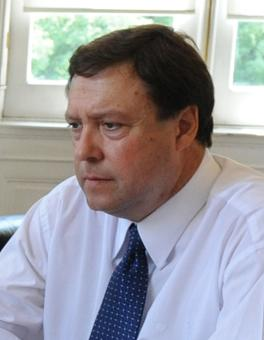
- Incumbent; Alberto Weretilneck since 10 December 2023
- Appointer: Direct popular vote
- Term length: 4 years
- Inaugural holder: Lorenzo Vintter

The Governor of Río Negro (Spanish: Gobernador de la Provincia de Río Negro) is a citizen of the Río Negro Province, in Argentina, holding the office of governor for the corresponding period. The governor is elected alongside a vice-governor. Currently the governor of Río Negro is Alberto Weretilneck.

== Governors since 1983 ==
Governor	Term in office	Party	Election	Vice Governor
Osvaldo Álvarez Guerrero	10 December 1983 – 10 December 1987	UCR	1983	—N/a
Horacio Massaccesi	10 December 1987 – 10 December 1995	UCR	1987	Pablo Verani
Horacio Massaccesi	10 December 1987 – 10 December 1995	UCR	1991	Edgardo Gagliardi
Pablo Verani	10 December 1995 – 10 December 2003	UCR	1995	Bautista Mendioroz
Pablo Verani	10 December 1995 – 10 December 2003	UCR	1999	Bautista Mendioroz
Miguel Saiz	10 December 2003 – 10 December 2011	UCR	2003	Mario de Rege
Miguel Saiz	10 December 2003 – 10 December 2011	UCR	2007	Bautista Mendioroz
Carlos Ernesto Soria	10 December 2011 – 1 January 2012	PJ	2011	Alberto Weretilneck
Alberto Weretilneck	1 January 2012 – 10 December 2019	FG	—N/a	Carlos Peralta
Alberto Weretilneck	1 January 2012 – 10 December 2019	JSRN	2015	Pedro Pesatti
Arabela Carreras	10 December 2019 – 10 December 2023	JSRN	2019	Alejandro Palmieri
Alberto Weretilneck	10 December 2023 – Incumbent	JSRN	2023	Pedro Oscar Pesatti

== See also ==
- List of current provincial governors in Argentina
- Legislature of Río Negro
