= Horacio Massaccesi =

Argentine politician (born 1948)

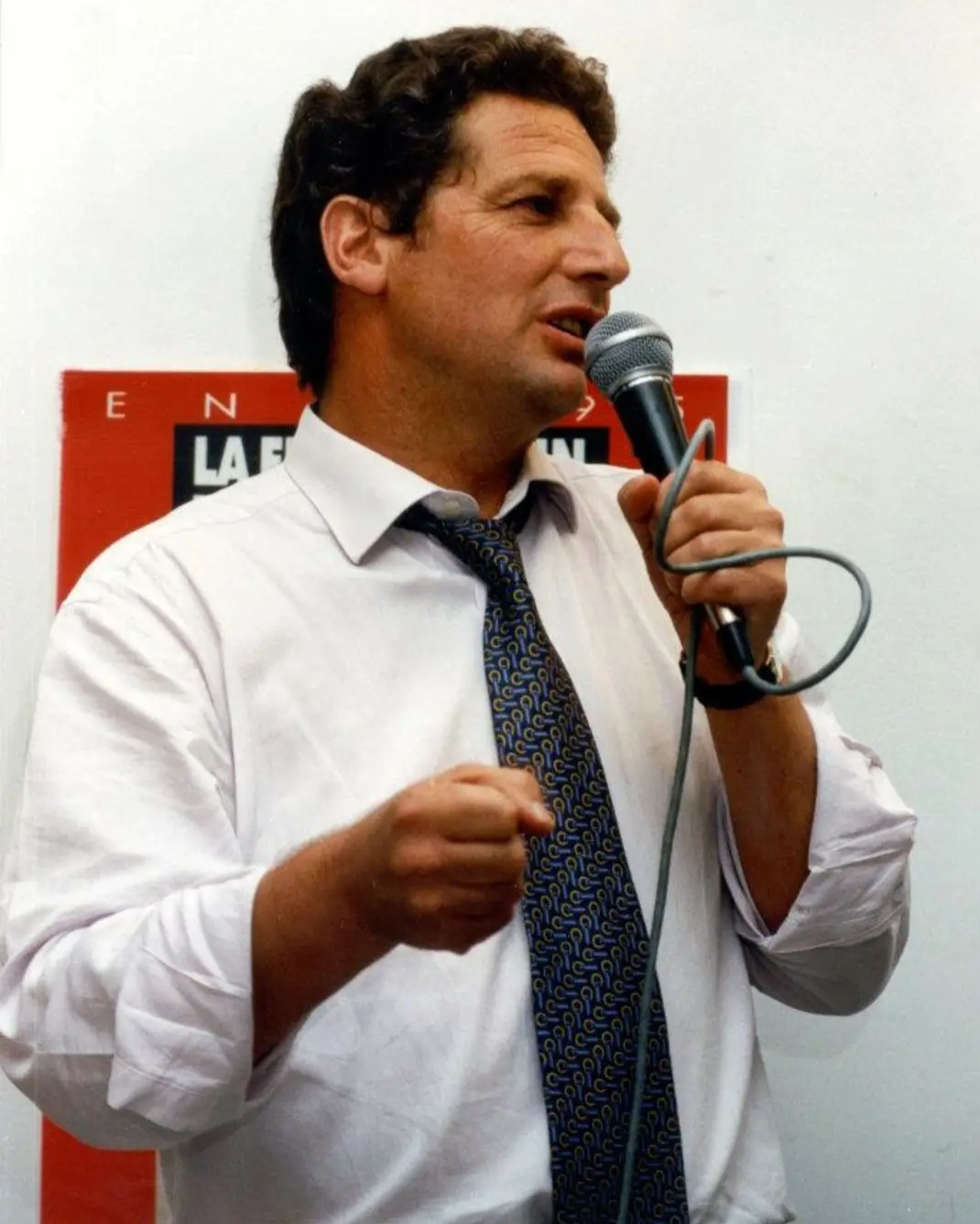
- Massaccesi in 1995

National Senator
- In office August 10, 1997 – December 10, 2001
- Constituency: Río Negro

Governor of Río Negro
- In office December 10, 1987 – December 10, 1995
- Preceded by: Osvaldo Álvarez Guerrero
- Succeeded by: Pablo Verani

Personal details
- Born: September 12, 1948 (age 77) Villa Regina
- Party: Radical Civic Union (UCR)
- Spouse: Patricia Querejeta
- Profession: Lawyer

Horacio Massaccesi (born September 12, 1948) is an Argentine politician who was the former governor of Río Negro Province.

== Life and times ==
=== Early career ===
Massaccesi was born in 1948 to an Italian Argentine family in Villa Regina, then a largely agricultural town on the banks of the Río Negro in Argentina's region of Patagonia. He joined the centrist Radical Civic Union (UCR) in 1974, while in law school, and on Argentina's return to democracy in 1983, Massaccesi was elected to the Provincial Legislature. Governor Osvaldo Álvarez Guerrero named him Minister of Government (similar to a Chief of Staff) in 1984, a recognition which led to his election to the Argentine Chamber of Deputies (Lower House of Congress) in 1985.

Elected by a 38-35% margin over populist Justicialist Party candidate Remo Costanzo, Massaccesi became one of only two UCR Governors elected in 1987, after the popular Álvarez Guerrero was termed out of office. Upon taking office, Massaccesi advanced a new Provincial Constitution. Enacted in 1988, the document allowed him to run for reelection. Following Justicialist Party candidate Carlos Menem's landslide defeat of the UCR for the presidency in 1989, Massaccesi adopted a pragmatic stance towards the unpredictable Menem, distancing himself with Álvarez Guerrero. Continuing financial instability, however, led Menem's new Economy Minister, Domingo Cavallo, to retain around US$60 million in revenue sharing funds derived from the orchard-rich Río Negro Province's growing export earnings. The province, which in turn owed the central bank US$100 million, found itself in circumstances not unlike most provinces in Argentina at the time.

=== Robin Hood of patagonia ===
This leading to a budgetary crisis in his province and an inability to pay some 30,000 provincial employees, on July 4, 1991 Governor Massaccesi entered the General Roca branch of the public Bank of the Province of Río Negro, wherein he signed a decree authorizing the seizure of nearly US$17 million from an account held by the Central Bank of Argentina. Explaining that "I was told repeatedly that no help was coming. What were my options - to not pay my people?"

Massaccesi was indicted by Justice Minister León Arslanian for grand larceny, Cavallo ordered the province's accounts frozen, and the President hinted that a conservator would be appointed in the governor's stead; ultimately, however, the wave of goodwill Massaccesi earned nationally led Menem to suspend any action against the "Robin Hood of Patagonia." By mutual agreement, the province repaid the central bank within 30 days of the event.

The Governor was reelected that September by a margin of 46-27%, following which he became a conditional ally of the Menem Administration, whose free market policies were a reversal of his populist 1989 platform. He and Menem also shared a personal affinity, including an interest in tennis and River Plate (one of Argentina's preeminent football teams). Massaccesi supported the newly returned President of the UCR, former President Raúl Alfonsín, in his 1993 political overtures to the then-popular Menem. Hoping to avoid defeat in the upcoming 1995 elections, Alfonsín negotiated the Olivos Pact with Menem, by which the Argentine Constitution would be extensively amended to allow the President reelection - in return for an expansion of the Argentine Senate and other changes designed to favor the UCR.

=== Bid for the presidency ===
His popularity and staunch support for the pact earned Massaccesi Alfonsín's support for the UCR nomination, which the Governor won in 1994 by a margin of 2-to-1 over Federico Storani, a young UCR figure opposed to the changes. The low turnout in the UCR's 1994 primaries bode poorly for Argentina's oldest existing political party, however, and in 1995, Massaccesi and his running mate, Córdoba Province Congressman Antonio "La Tuta" Hernández, received 17% of the vote (placing third and dealing the UCR its worst national defeat, up to then). Termed out as Governor, Massaccesi left a province in financial straits, though he earned plaudits for his policies streamlining the bloated provincial government and for supporting new casinos, for instance. The UCR retained the post and he was elected to the Argentine Senate that November, though charges pending on the 1991 "Robin Hood" incident barred him from the Senate until 1997.

Massaccesi founded Noticias de la Costa, a Viedma newspaper, with his second wife Patricia Querejeta in 1996. Keeping a low profile in the Senate, he did not run for reelection in 2001 (a disastrous year for the UCR, which had gained the presidency in 1999 on an Alliance ticket with the center-left Frepaso). Distanced from the UCR, he endorsed centrist Peronist candidate Adolfo Rodríguez Saá's failed 2003 presidential bid. Rodríguez Saa, a member of the UCR's main opposition, the Justicialist Party, was Governor of nearby San Luis Province. That year, Massaccesi published Haceme Senador (Make Me a Senator), a criticism of the role of the media in the political process.

=== Massaccesi today ===
The former Governor was convicted of embezzlement of public funds by a federal court in General Roca on May 6, 2005, for his seizure of the central bank funds in 1991, and given a suspended jail sentence, as well as being barred from public office. Massaccesi appealed the decision on the grounds that the ruling implied that the funds were absconded with for personal gain, when they were used in their entirety to pay public salaries (the courts have thus far denied him an appeal).

Massaccesi and his wife continue to live in Viedma, where they devote their time to their news daily, Noticias de la Costa.
