= Lorenzo Vintter =

Argentine military officer

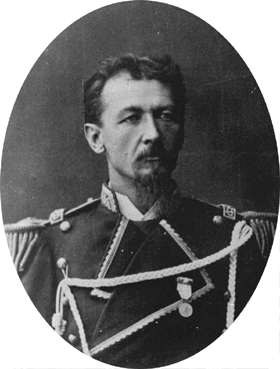
- Gral. Vintter

Governor of Formosa, Argentina
- In office 1901–1902
- Preceded by: José María Uriburu
- Succeeded by: Irinéo Lima

Personal details
- Born: 11 October 1842 Buenos Aires, Argentina
- Died: 5 July 1915 (aged 72) Buenos Aires, Argentina
- Spouse: Marcelina Villalba
- Occupation: Military officer, politician

Military service
- Allegiance: Argentina
- Branch/service: Argentine Army
- Years of service: 1862–1900
- Rank: General
- Battles/wars: Paraguayan War; Conquest of the Desert; Revolution of the Park

Lorenzo Vintter (11 October 1842 – 5 July 1915) was an Argentine military officer, who participated in the War of the Triple Alliance and the Conquest of the Desert. He was governor of the Patagonia and Río Negro regions. He also served as governor of Formosa between 1901 and 1904.
