= Carlos Soria =

Argentine lawyer and politician

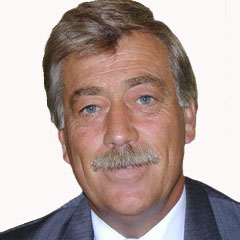
- Soria in 1995.

Governor of Río Negro
- In office December 10, 2011 – January 1, 2012
- Lieutenant: Alberto Weretilneck
- Preceded by: Miguel Saiz
- Succeeded by: Alberto Weretilneck

Mayor of General Roca
- In office December 10, 2003 – December 9, 2011
- Preceded by: Miguel Saiz
- Succeeded by: Martín Soria

Secretary of State Intelligence
- In office January 2, 2002 – July 10, 2002
- Preceded by: Carlos Sargnese
- Succeeded by: Miguel Ángel Toma

National Deputy
- In office December 10, 1999 – January 2, 2002
- Constituency: Buenos Aires

Minister of Justice and Security of Buenos Aires Province
- In office September 21, 1999 – December 10, 1999
- Preceded by: Osvaldo Lorenzo
- Succeeded by: Aldo Rico

National Deputy
- In office December 10, 1983 – September 21, 1999
- Constituency: Río Negro

Personal details
- Born: March 1, 1949 Bahía Blanca, Argentina
- Died: January 1, 2012 (aged 62) General Roca, Río Negro, Argentina
- Party: Justicialist Party/Front for Victory
- Spouse: Susana Freydoz
- Children: Martín, María Emilia, Germán, Carlos
- Education: University of Buenos Aires
- Profession: Lawyer

Carlos Ernesto Soria (March 1, 1949 – January 1, 2012) was an Argentine lawyer and Justicialist Party politician who served as governor of Río Negro Province from December 10, 2011, until his murder at the hands of his wife Susana Freydoz.

== Early life and career ==
Soria was born in Bahía Blanca in 1949, and was raised in a nearby rural town, General Daniel Cerri. His father, Ernesto Soria, was an outspoken Peronist, and was arrested shortly after the 1955 coup against President Juan Perón. Following his release several months later, the Sorias relocated to Bariloche. The elder Soria was again arrested amid a crackdown on Peronist protests during a state visit to Bariloche by U.S. President Dwight Eisenhower in March 1959, and was imprisoned in Bahía Blanca. He was released in April 1962 and the family settled in General Roca, Río Negro, where they opened a neighborhood store.

Carlos Soria enrolled at the University of Buenos Aires, earning a law degree in 1973. Elections that March returned Peronists to power, and Soria was elected to the local Justicialist Party (JP) chapter. He was later elected to the Provincial Council of the JP, and upon the return of democracy in 1983, won a seat in the Argentine Chamber of Deputies.

== Tenure in Congress ==
Soria would be elected to Congress for four consecutive terms, becoming Chairman of the Constitutional Affairs Committee. He also served in the Justice, Impeachments, and Money Laundering committees; chaired the joint committee investigating the 1992 Israeli Embassy attack in Buenos Aires and the 1994 AMIA bombing (the two most significant acts of Islamic terrorism in Argentine history); and served in the Council of Magistracy of the Nation.

Soria shared President Carlos Menem's opposition to trials opened in 1996 in Spanish courts against Dirty War perpetrators by Judge Baltasar Garzón, and personally led a delegation to protest these trials; when Judge Garzón turned the tables on the delegation by calling them to testify, they returned, however, creating an embarrassing diplomatic incident. He later presented a bill to restrict rights and toughen sentences for those accused of violent crime, as well as another which would have granted congressional immunity to all members in perpetuity; both bills were defeated.

Soria would later be indicted for obstruction of justice in his capacity as Chair of the Joint Committee on the AMIA bombing, and though he was cleared of all charges, the Río Negro PJ dropped him from their party list ahead of the 1999 elections. Soria was then offered a place in the Buenos Aires Province PJ list for Congress by Governor Eduardo Duhalde. Shortly before the October 1999 elections, moreover, Duhalde appointed Soria as Provincial Minister of Justice. His appointment took place on the heels of the September 16 Ramallo massacre, a botched Provincial Police intervention during an armed bank robbery that resulted in the deaths of two hostages. Soria promptly released hitherto sequestered police files relating to the case which confirmed that the robbery, as well as the deaths of all robbers and hostages alike, had been orchestrated by Provincial Police officers.

Remaining on the electoral list for National Deputies, Soria took his seat in Congress in December representing the Province of Buenos Aires. He became among the leading congressional opponents of President Fernando de la Rúa's austerity package, scuttling a 2000 decree which would have cut public sector salaries (this ultimately took place the following year). President de la Rúa's resignation in December 2001, and the subsequent Congressional designation of Duhalde as provisional president resulted in Soria's appointment as Secretary of State Intelligence (SIDE) in January 2002.

== Tenure at State Intelligence ==
Taking office, as President Duhalde did, amid widespread protest, Soria's tenure at SIDE would eventually be marred by a June 26 incident in which two piqueteros, Maximiliano Kosteki and Darío Santillán, were shot in the back in Avellaneda by Provincial Police officers. SIDE had produced intelligence reports stating that the overthrow of the national government had been openly advocated in piqueteros' assemblies, and that these were attended by the extremist group Revolutionary Armed Forces of Colombia (FARC). Phone conversations between minutes before the assassinations between a policeman implicated in the incident and the Undersecretary of Intelligence at the time, Oscar Rodríguez, proved SIDE involvement in the tragedy in subsequent trials.

Fallout from this incident was compounded by allegations made by Senator Cristina Fernández de Kirchner that SIDE personnel were spying on her husband, Santa Cruz Governor Néstor Kirchner, who had recently declared his intention to run for President the following year. These controversies, and Soria's own plans to run for Governor of the Province of Río Negro, prompted his resignation from SIDE in July. He was narrowly defeated in provincial elections in August 2003 by UCR candidate Miguel Saiz, though in elections held later in 2003, Soria narrowly won the election for mayor of the city of General Roca (the largest in the province). Duhalde and Soria continued to face charges in court related to the 2002 deaths. Soria declared at trial in 2005 that "democracy works with order, and we needed to establish order"; both men were cleared of all charges.

== Return to Río Negro ==
Soria was overwhelmingly reelected as mayor of General Roca in 2007, garnering 73% of the vote. He clinched the Justicialist Party nomination for Governor of Río Negro in 2011, and ran with the support of the Front for Victory (FpV) faction of the party despite his long-standing alliance with the FpV's main rival, Duhalde. Soria's principal opponent in the race, UCR nominee César Barbeito, also professed his support of the FpV's standard-bearer, President Cristina Kirchner. The president formally endorsed Soria despite their past differences, however, while maintaining her distance from both candidates. Soria was elected governor in September with 51% of the vote, besting Barbeito by nearly 14%.

== Death ==
Soria died on January 1, 2012, during the new year celebrations with his family at his farm near General Roca. He was shot in the face with a .38 caliber weapon at around 5 am, and was moved immediately to a nearby hospital, where he died minutes later. The police did not determine initially whether the death was caused by an accident or foul play; his wife was held for further questioning. He received a private funeral. His widow, Susana Freydoz, was charged with murder on January 19, 2012. That November, Susana Freydoz was convicted of murder and sentenced to 18 years in prison.

Vice-governor Alberto Weretilneck succeeded Soria as governor. Weretilneck considered calling new elections, despite provisions in the Constitution of Río Negro Province that would allow him to complete the remainder of Soria's term. He however chose not to call new elections and was reelected in 2015.

== See also ==
- List of secretaries of intelligence of Argentina

Government offices
| Preceded by Carlos Sergnese | Secretary of Intelligence; 2002 | Succeeded by Miguel Ángel Toma |
Political offices
| Preceded by Miguel Saiz | Governor of Río Negro Province; December 9, 2011 – January 1, 2012 | Succeeded by Alberto Weretilneck |
