= General Roca, Río Negro =

General Roca
- City
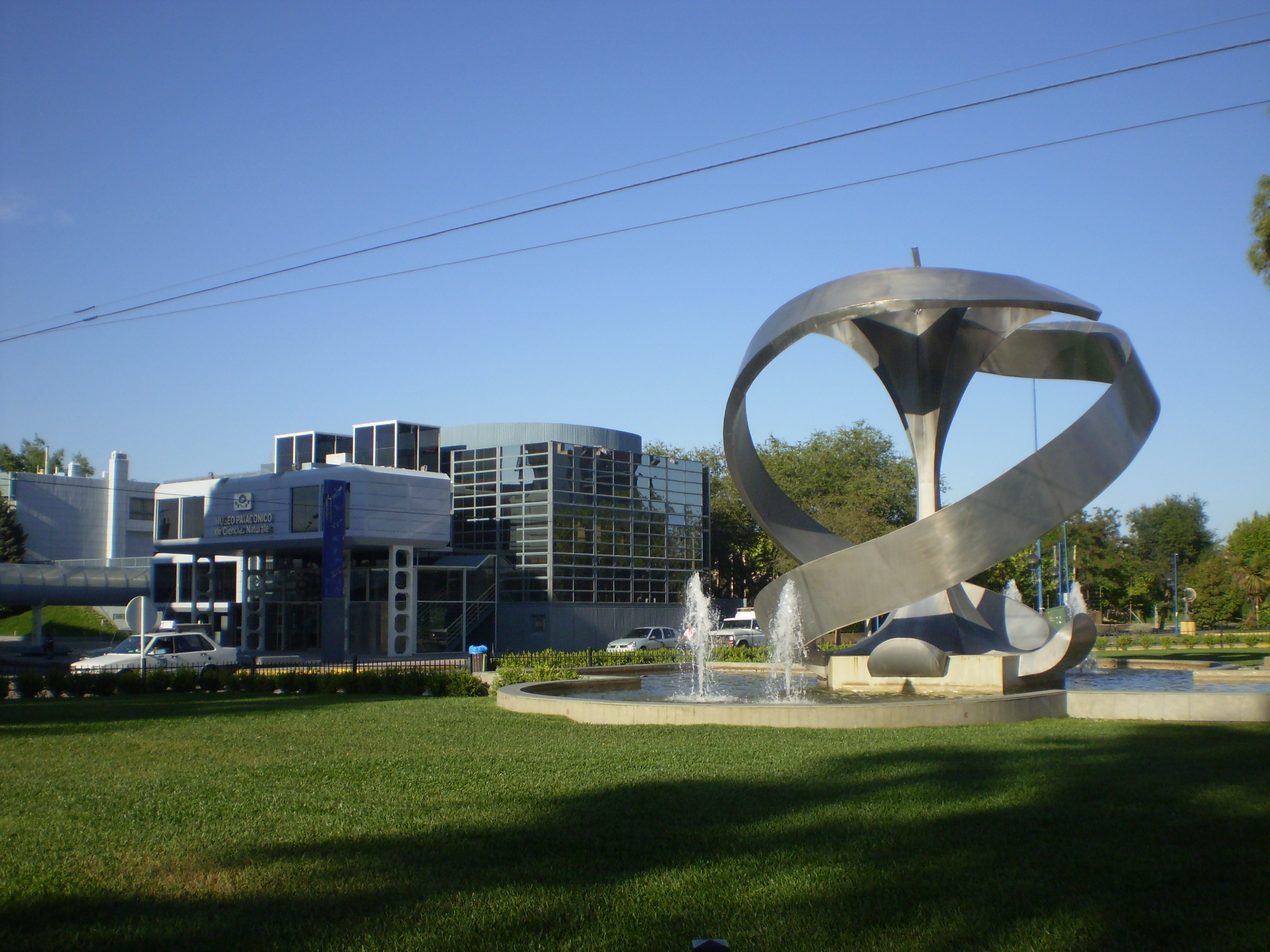
- Monument to the Apple and the Museum of Natural History, one of the world's foremost dinosaur fossil displays

- Location of General Roca in Argentina
- Coordinates: 39°2′S 67°35′W
- Country: Argentina
- Province: Río Negro Province
- Department: General Roca
- Founded: September 1, 1879

Government
  - Intendant: María Emilia Soria (PJ)
- Highest elevation: 300 m (980 ft)
- Lowest elevation: 227 m (745 ft)

Population (2022 census)
  - Total: 102,750
- Time zone: UTC−3 (ART)
- CPA base: R8332
- Dialing code: +54 298
- Climate: BWk
- Website: Official website

General Roca is a city in the northeast of the Argentine province of Río Negro, northern Patagonia. It was founded on September 1, 1879, by Colonel Lorenzo Vintter, on the order of War Minister Julio A. Roca, during the Conquest of the Desert. The place of the first settlement was known by native mapuche people as Fiske Menuco, which means "deep water". It was destroyed in 1899 by a flooding of the Río Negro, and had to be rebuilt 5 kilometres (3.1 mi) northwest in higher lands.

Its present population is approximately 102,750 (according to 2022 census [INDEC]), making it the second most populated city in the province after Bariloche, and the second most important in the Alto Valle after Neuquén. The main activity around the city is the intensive agriculture under irrigation, which made possible an intense agro-industrial activity. The main crops are pears and apples. The city hosts the annual National Festival of the Apple, which is held in early February.

General Roca, named after Julio A. Roca, is located 1,200 kilometres (750 mi) from Buenos Aires, 505 kilometres (314 mi) from Bahía Blanca, 513 kilometres (319 mi) from Viedma and 400 kilometres (250 mi) from the deepwater port of San Antonio Este. The city is connected to the east by Argentine National Route 22, and is also crossed by provincial routes 6 and 65, which connect it to other cities in the Alto Valle, with the south of the province, and with the La Pampa Province. Through the centre of the city drives the wide rail train lane that joins Zapala with Bahía Blanca and Buenos Aires. The local airport connects General Roca with other points of the country, mainly with Buenos Aires and Mendoza. Nonetheless, due to lack of maintenance, the airport has not been used since the year 2000.

Together with Villa Regina, Allen, Cinco Saltos, Cipolletti, Neuquén and many other smaller towns, they constitute the lineal urbanization of the Alto Valle of the Negro River. The city is surrounded by a patchwork of irrigated land totaling 100,000 hectares (250,000 acres). Besides apple and pear orchards, there are vineyards and other establishments producing peaches and a variety of other fruits and vegetables. Within the industrial sector, the fruit-refrigerating storehouses, fruit and vegetable packaging, and other agriculture-related industries stand out.

== Tourist attractions ==
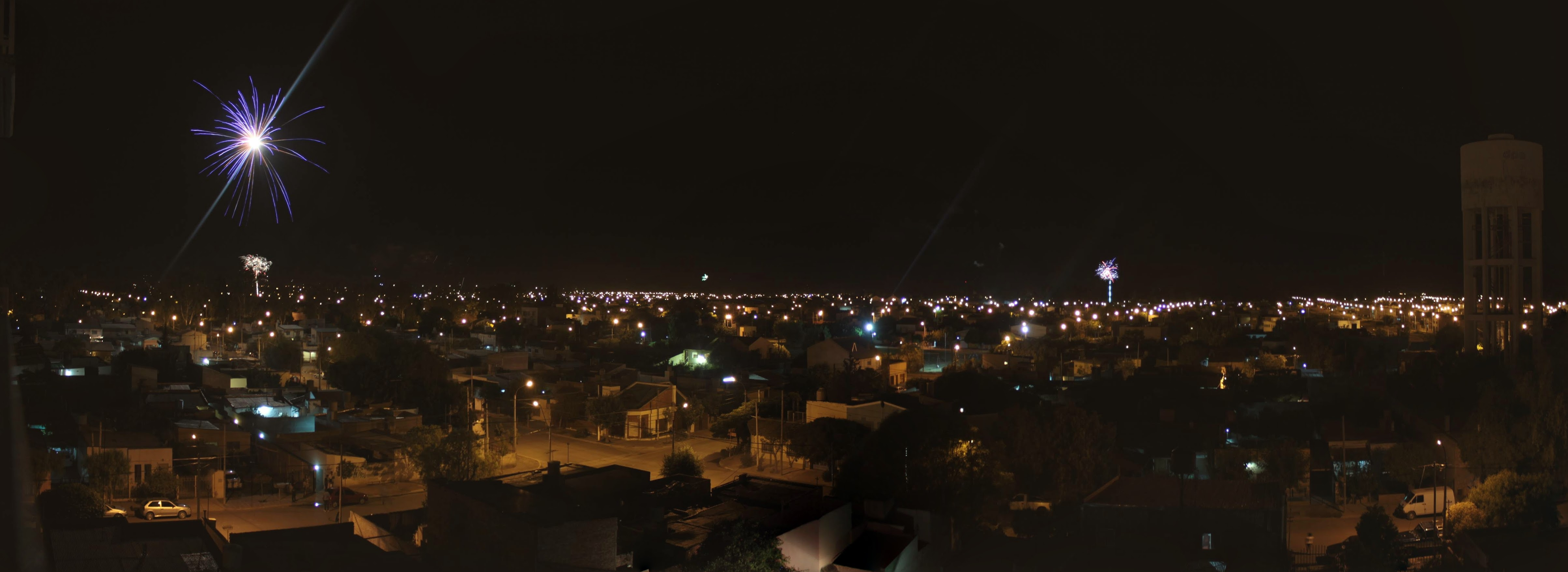
A panoramic picture of General Roca at night where fireworks can be seen.

=== "Old Town" ===
The place of the first settlement where General Roca was founded, near Río Negro shoreline, is known as "Old Town". Several buildings dating back to the time before the flooding and subsequent move of the town can be still visited:

- San Miguel School
- María Auxiliadora Sanctuary
- Old María Auxiliadora School
- Villegas Square
- Stefenelli Train Station

== 2016 meteor event ==
In the afternoon of 20 June 2016, a series of loud blasts could be heard in General Roca, causing buildings to shake and windows to rattle, but police, firefighters and emergency workers could not find any evidence of an explosion or natural calamity. No damage was reported. The astronomical observatory in nearby Neuquén later revealed that the cause had been a meteor that burst in the atmosphere over the city, at an estimated speed of 2,400 kilometres per hour (1,500 mph). Astronomer Roberto Figueroa estimated that the meteor measured approximately 12 metres (39 ft) across and probably broke on atmospheric entry, falling mostly as ash, but some larger fragments could have reached the lower atmosphere and caused an audible boom.

== Geography ==
=== Climate ===
General Roca has a semi-arid climate with warm to hot summers, combined with cool winters. Rainfall is sparse year round, resulting in a relative arid influence of the climate, being located in the Andean rain shadow.

Climate data for General Roca, Río Negro (1997–2011)
Month	Jan	Feb	Mar	Apr	May	Jun	Jul	Aug	Sep	Oct	Nov	Dec	Year
Record high °C (°F)	40.7 (105.3)	37.9 (100.2)	36.7 (98.1)	30.9 (87.6)	30.4 (86.7)	24.3 (75.7)	23.8 (74.8)	28.2 (82.8)	28.1 (82.6)	32.9 (91.2)	36.2 (97.2)	38.2 (100.8)	40.7 (105.3)
Mean daily maximum °C (°F)	31.3 (88.3)	31.4 (88.5)	26.4 (79.5)	22.7 (72.9)	17.1 (62.8)	13.3 (55.9)	12.7 (54.9)	15.1 (59.2)	19.5 (67.1)	22.3 (72.1)	27.2 (81.0)	29.4 (84.9)	22.4 (72.3)
Daily mean °C (°F)	22.9 (73.2)	22.7 (72.9)	17.6 (63.7)	12.9 (55.2)	8.5 (47.3)	7.2 (45.0)	5.4 (41.7)	7.7 (45.9)	11.3 (52.3)	14.6 (58.3)	18.9 (66.0)	21.2 (70.2)	14.2 (57.6)
Mean daily minimum °C (°F)	14.3 (57.7)	15.1 (59.2)	9.3 (48.7)	4.8 (40.6)	1.4 (34.5)	1.9 (35.4)	0.6 (33.1)	1.6 (34.9)	3.0 (37.4)	6.8 (44.2)	10.4 (50.7)	13.1 (55.6)	6.8 (44.2)
Record low °C (°F)	5.5 (41.9)	3.8 (38.8)	0.7 (33.3)	−4.4 (24.1)	−9.7 (14.5)	−9.3 (15.3)	−9.0 (15.8)	−8.9 (16.0)	−5.9 (21.4)	−2.4 (27.7)	−1.1 (30.0)	4.6 (40.3)	−9.7 (14.5)
Average precipitation mm (inches)	20.1 (0.79)	14.7 (0.58)	21.3 (0.84)	19.0 (0.75)	18.5 (0.73)	23.0 (0.91)	17.4 (0.69)	11.1 (0.44)	25.5 (1.00)	22.3 (0.88)	12.1 (0.48)	14.2 (0.56)	206.1 (8.11)
Source: Departamento Provincial de Aguas

Climate data for General Roca (Alto Valle agricultural experimental station) 1990–2004, extremes 1923–1987 and 1990–2004
Month	Jan	Feb	Mar	Apr	May	Jun	Jul	Aug	Sep	Oct	Nov	Dec	Year
Record high °C (°F)	42.0 (107.6)	40.0 (104.0)	40.2 (104.4)	40.0 (104.0)	31.2 (88.2)	29.2 (84.6)	27.3 (81.1)	30.9 (87.6)	34.3 (93.7)	39.1 (102.4)	40.0 (104.0)	40.5 (104.9)	42.0 (107.6)
Mean daily maximum °C (°F)	30.4 (86.7)	29.0 (84.2)	26.3 (79.3)	21.2 (70.2)	16.9 (62.4)	13.4 (56.1)	13.5 (56.3)	16.9 (62.4)	19.3 (66.7)	23.2 (73.8)	26.2 (79.2)	29.1 (84.4)	22.1 (71.8)
Daily mean °C (°F)	24.2 (75.6)	22.5 (72.5)	19.2 (66.6)	13.8 (56.8)	9.9 (49.8)	7.0 (44.6)	6.7 (44.1)	9.1 (48.4)	12.7 (54.9)	17.0 (62.6)	20.4 (68.7)	23.2 (73.8)	15.5 (59.9)
Mean daily minimum °C (°F)	13.1 (55.6)	11.7 (53.1)	9.8 (49.6)	5.3 (41.5)	2.5 (36.5)	0.4 (32.7)	−0.7 (30.7)	0.5 (32.9)	3.4 (38.1)	6.9 (44.4)	9.8 (49.6)	12.4 (54.3)	6.3 (43.3)
Record low °C (°F)	−0.6 (30.9)	−1.7 (28.9)	−5.5 (22.1)	−7.3 (18.9)	−12.7 (9.1)	−12.6 (9.3)	−13.2 (8.2)	−12.5 (9.5)	−12.5 (9.5)	−5.0 (23.0)	−3.0 (26.6)	−2.4 (27.7)	−13.2 (8.2)
Average precipitation mm (inches)	18.6 (0.73)	18.0 (0.71)	25.0 (0.98)	27.2 (1.07)	25.9 (1.02)	22.3 (0.88)	16.9 (0.67)	8.8 (0.35)	18.8 (0.74)	26.1 (1.03)	21.9 (0.86)	14.2 (0.56)	243.7 (9.59)
Average precipitation days	2.3	2.1	3.8	4.7	5.2	5.7	3.7	2.3	3.9	3.7	3.5	2.3	43.2
Average relative humidity (%)	58	61	64	67	70	72	72	66	64	63	59	60	65
Mean monthly sunshine hours	303.8	274.0	235.6	174.0	133.3	108.0	136.4	179.8	186.0	229.4	255.0	288.3	2,503.6
Percentage possible sunshine	68	68	61	54	42	39	47	54	52	57	60	62	55
Source: Instituto Nacional de Tecnología Agropecuaria

== Notable people ==
- Susana Freydoz (born 1951) – wife of Governor Carlos Soria, mother of mayors Martín and María Emilia Soria, and convicted murderer
- Alejo Tabares (born 2001) – footballer
