= List of political scandals in Argentina =

This article provides a list of political scandals that involve officials from the government or politicians of Argentina.

== Cadet scandal (1942) ==
In September 1942, a sex and political scandal broke out in Buenos Aires, regarding the involvement of young cadets from the Colegio Militar de la Nación in alleged sex parties held by gay men of the upper classes.

== Assassination of Pedro Eugenio Aramburu (1970) ==
On 1 June 1970, former de facto president Pedro Eugenio Aramburu was killed by Montoneros militants three days after his kidnapping. The case divided the military and led to the collapse of President Juan Carlos Onganía, also a military leader, who was accused of showing himself indifferent to Aramburu's killing and with some people, among them Aramburu's son, suggesting that elements from Onganía's government had been involved in the kidnapping and execution of Aramburu.

The controversy led to the reinstatement of capital punishment in Argentina and increased violence in the country.

== Swiftgate (1991) ==
Swift, an American food processing company, wanted to apply for a grant to keep open its facilities in the province of Santa Fe. The presidential adviser Emir Yoma was accused of asking for a commission or kickback in exchange for facilitating the process. In December 1990, the ambassador of the United States, Terence Todman, sent a note to the Argentine government, which backed a complaint from Swift of a bribery request to "speed up" the release of tax paperwork for machinery for its plant in Rosario. As a result of the events, Yoma had to resign for asking the bribe and Antonio Erman Gonzalez left the Ministry of Economy.

== Yomagate (1991) ==
The cause of Yomagate was an investigation of a cocaine trafficking operation. According to the investigation, large sums of drug money from New York City would have been destined to Argentina, to be laundered by various financial transactions, with the purchase of real estate, jewellery or entrepreneurship. Another portion of the money was to be diverted at the same time to Uruguay. The cause of Yomagate involved Amira Yoma, the secretary and sister-in-law of then Argentine president Carlos Menem, her ex-husband Ibrahim al-Ibrahim (co-director of customs at the Ezeiza airport) and various notorious drug traffickers and launderers like Monzer al-Kassar. Amira Yoma went under preventive detention, which was then overruled by the head of the Chamber the Federal Criminal Court Luisa Riva Aramayo; after which the investigation was cancelled and the investigation cleared all suspects of all charges.

== Bombing of the Israeli embassy in Buenos Aires (1992) ==
On 17 March 1992, 29 civilians were killed and 242 additional civilians were injured when the Israeli embassy of Argentina was bombed by the Islamic Jihad Organization. President Néstor Kirchner pronounced that the incidenrt, along with the AMIA bombing in 1994, with no real inquiries, equalled a "national disgrace".

== Carrasco murder case (1994) ==
On 6 March 1994, conscript Omar Carrasco disappeared from the artillery unit base where he was stationed in Zapala, Neuquén Province. After his body was found a month later and it was discovered that Carrasco had been tortured and murdered, social outrage at the military and mandatory military service peaked. President Carlos Menem initially defended the armed forces but changed his position after meeting with Carrasco's parents and receiving information from authorities that the young man had indeed been murdered by his superiors after three days of hazing and harassment.

As a result of the social backlash and pressure, as well as from other political factions, which Menem at times blamed for using the case for a smear campaign, he issued a decree on 31 August 1994 abolishing conscription in Argentina.

== Arms exports (1995) ==
In 1995 it emerged that illegal arms shipments of 6500 tons of weapons and ammunition had been exported from Argentina to Croatia and Ecuador between 1991 and 1995. At the time of the shipments Croatia was under a United Nations arms embargo, and Argentina was prohibited from selling weapons to Ecuador under the terms of a peace agreement signed in 1942. The Río Tercero explosion was found to have been orchestrated to destroy the evidence of the arms sales.

== Disappearance of Jorge Julio López (2006) ==
Jorge Julio López, a retired bricklayer who was kidnapped during the National Reorganization Process, a disappeared again during the democratic government of Néstor Kirchner after testifying in trial against the convicted murderer Miguel Etchecolatz. As of 2025, Jorge Julio López remains missing.

== Suitcase scandal (2007) ==
A scandal involving Venezuela and Argentina, souring the relations between the countries.

== Agrarian strikes (2008) ==
In March 2008, Cristina Fernández de Kirchner's government introduced a new sliding-scale taxation system for agricultural exports, effectively raising levies on soybean exports to 44% from 35% at the time of the announcement. The aim was to raise government funds for social investment by increasing the government's share of returns from rising world grain prices, and also to reduce domestic food prices by encouraging farmers to switch to growing staple foods like wheat and corn, rather than export crops such as soybeans. Farmers, on the other hand, felt that the export duties were already too high. Strikes ensued until July when the tariffs on agricultural exports were returned by the government.

== Triple crime (2008) ==
After three pharmaceutical businessmen, Sebastián Forza, Damián Ferrón, and Leopoldo Bina, were tortured and murdered in 2008, an investigation ensued. The investigations in the following days revealed that the three men had ties with narcotics trafficking cartels. The drugstore of José Luis Salerno, a former associate of Ferrón's, was closed. Forza and Ferrón had a lab in Ingeniero Maschwitz that manufactured illegal drugs. The import of ephedrine into Argentina was restricted a month later, limiting it only to the labs that prepare legal drugs that contain it. It was also discovered that Forza financed the political campaign of Cristina Fernández de Kirchner during the 2007 general elections. The suspects were arrested and found guilty.

In December 2015, three of the incarcerated broke out of prison. Governor María Eugenia Vidal fired the leaders of the jailing system of the Buenos Aires province, who were suspected of having abetted the escape. They were later found and returned to prison

== Kirchners and the media (2009) ==
The Governments of Néstor Kirchner and Cristina Fernández de Kirchner had several conflicts with major media groups. Kirchner accused the Clarín Group, La Nación, Perfil, and related media of having promoted their overthrow.

== Buenos Aires wiretapping case (2009) ==
In October 2009, Sergio Burstein, a leader of the Jewish community who had led the opposition against the appointment of Fino Palacios as Police Chief due to his connections with the 1994 AMIA terrorist attack, criminally denounced that he was being spied on by the Police of the City of Buenos Aires.

In October 2018, the National Chamber of Criminal Cassation annulled the entire case.

== Schoklender scandal (2011) ==
Sergio Schoklender, known for his murder of his parents in 1981, was accused of embezzlement of public funds for a project arranged by the Mothers of the Plaza de Mayo.

== Soria-Freydoz scandal (2012) ==
In the first hours of New Year's Day 2012, the recently inaugurated Governor of Río Negro Province Carlos Soria was shot and killed by his wife Susana Freydoz, who had become pathologically jealous due to Soria's infidelities, including an affair with a 36-year-old kinesiologist and daughter of one of his long-time friends.

The killing sparked a political scandal in General Roca, where the Sorias are a political family and in the nation too, with journalist Julio Bazán writing that Freydoz resembled the treatment and conflicts between high-stakes political couples, citing other examples in the country's history.

== Boudougate (2012) ==
Vice President Amado Boudou was accused of being involved in the Revocation of the bankruptcy of the Ciccone Calcográfica printing house. In August 2018, following a lengthy investigation, he was convicted of corruption. He was then sentenced to five years and ten months in prison, and banned for life from holding public office.

== The Route of the K-Money (2013) ==
An investigation, led by journalist Jorge Lanata found evidence of embezzlement and an associated money trail involving businessman Lázaro Báez. In mid-2020 he was transferred to house arrest as the proceedings were put on hold due to the COVID-19 pandemic. After two days of popular protests Báez was moved again to a secret location where he awaits trial under police custody.

== Hotesur scandal (2014) ==
Hotesur was a firm that administered the hotels in El Calafate that belong to Cristina Fernández de Kirchner and her family. Initially, it was suspected of not paying taxes, but the investigation headed by judge Claudio Bonadio led to suspicions about a possible case of money laundering, involving the businessman Lázaro Báez as well. As a result, the government attempted to force an impeachment of Bonadio.

== Alberto Nisman (2015) ==
Alberto Nisman, a lawyer who specialized in international terrorism was found shot in the head in his apartment in Buenos Aires on 19 January 2015.

== Noble siblings case (2016) ==
A case concerning the biological identity of Marcela and Felipe Noble Herrera, adoptive daughter and son of Ernestina Herrera de Noble, owner of Grupo Clarín. The Grandmothers of the Plaza de Mayo believe them to be children of women who disappeared during the Dirty War, and have requested samples for DNA profiling to compare with their database of victim families. Marcela and Felipe rejected the study. The administrations of both presidents Néstor and Cristina Kirchner supported a compulsory blood collection in order to carry out the DNA profiling. The opposing parties and legal precedence, on the other hand, support the Nobles right to privacy.

== José López scandal (2016) ==
In 2016, José Francisco López, a low-profile politician who worked at the Ministry of Federal Planning, Public Investment and Services under minister Julio de Vido during the presidencies of Néstor and Cristina Fernández de Kirchner, was detained in compromising circumstances, while allegedly trying to hide bags containing millions of dollars in a convent.

== Spying on families of ARA San Juan (2017) ==
In 2017 it was revealed that the Federal Intelligence Agency (AFI) had engaged in illegal spying and monitoring of the families of the victims of the disappearance of ARA San Juan.

== Chocobar Doctrine (2017) ==
On 8 December 2017, Buenos Aires City Police officer Luis Chocobar shot at two young men who were escaping after stabbing an American man in La Boca in a robbery attempt. One of them, 18-year-old Juan Pablo Kukoc, died as a result of the gunshot wounds, while a 17-year-old accomplice was wounded and arrested.

Following the shooting, Chocobar was indicted for excessive use of force. However, Macri's government strongly supported Chocobar's actions and hosted him as a hero in Casa Rosada. Security Minister Patricia Bullrich endorsed the Chocobar Doctrine, allowing broader rights for police officers to use lethal force.

== Notebook scandal (2018) ==
Driver Óscar Centeno alleged that he had frequently carried bags filled with US dollars to several locations, including public buildings and even the personal house of Cristina Fernández de Kirchner. Those bags would be payments for bribes. The prosecutors of the case asked for a search and seizure raid at the houses of Cristina Fernández de Kirchner.

== Argentine COVID-19 vaccination scandal (2021) ==
Literary critic Beatriz Sarlo denounced that she was offered to be vaccinated "under the table," but refused to identify the people who did it. Faced with the complaint, Fernán Quirós, the Minister of Health of the Autonomous City of Buenos Aires, indicated that this did not happen in his jurisdiction. As a result of the scandal the country's Minister of Health Ginés González García resigned from office.

== Attempted assassination of Cristina Fernández de Kirchner (2022) ==
On 1 September 2022, vice president Cristina Fernández de Kirchner was the target of an assassination attempt. A man approached her as she met with supporters outside of her official residence in Recoleta, Buenos Aires.

== Disappearance of Cecilia Strzyzowksi (2023) ==
The suspected femicide of a woman implicates her boyfriends parents who were candidates in the 2023 Argentine provincial elections. Emerenciano Sena and Marcela Acuña were leaders of the United Socialists political party and candidates for the Chaco Province.

== VIP retirement payments (2024) ==
In June 2024, various media outlets reported amid the conflict between pensioners and the government of Javier Milei that some individuals associated with heads of state in the country's history were earning millions of pesos as a form of VIP retirement payments.

Among these cases exposed by media were the cases of former presidents Cristina Fernández de Kirchner and Alberto Fernández, former first ladies Zulema Yoma and Bety Nelly Andrés (de facto), and a daughter of former president José María Guido.

== Davos remarks scandal (2025) ==
On 23 January 2025, Milei spoke at the World Economic Forum in Davos, Switzerland. In his speech, Milei strongly criticized what he referred to as gender ideology and lambasted those supporting the participation of transsexuals in sports. Milei also made a mention of the case of an American gay couple, William and Zachary Zulock, who were sentenced in December 2024 to 100 years in prison without the possibility of parole for raping their adoptive children and producing child pornography by exploiting them.

As a consequence of the comparison, Milei faced political and social backlash, as well as from the press, sparking the anti-fascist march on 1 February 2025, which repeated itself under broader demands in 2026.

== LIBRA Memecoin Scam Scandal (2025) ==
It is an ongoing scandal, started on February 14, 2025 by a post on X by president Javier Milei, recommending the brand new memecoin $LIBRA. The cryptocurrency plummeted shortly after, and the Argentine president was accused of participating in a rug pull.
