= Yoma (disambiguation) =

Yoma (יומא) is the fifth tractate of Seder Moed ("Order of Festivals") of the Mishnah and of the Talmud.

Yoma may also refer to:

== People ==
Surname

- Amira Yoma (born 1952), Argentine political advisor and restaurateur
- Jacobin Yoma (born 1966), French former professional boxer
- Jorge Yoma (born 1953), Argentine politician
- Zulema Yoma, former first lady of Argentina

Given name

- Yoma Komatsu, the eldest member of the J-Pop group BeForU

== Species ==
- Yoma sabina, Species of butterfly
- Yoma (butterfly), a genus of butterfly
- Yoma danio, a fish in the Cyprinid family

== Other uses ==
- Yoma Bank, Largest commercial banks of Myanmar
- Chin Hills-Arakan Yoma montane forests, a tropical and subtropical moist broadleaf forest ecoregion in western Myanmar
- Yoma Central, Development project in Myanmar
- Yoma Paw Kya Tae Myet Yay, Burmese Film

== See also ==
- Yom (disambiguation)
- Yōma (disambiguation)
