= Menem (surname) =

Menem is a surname. Notable people with the surname include:

- Carlos Menem (1930–2021), President of Argentina from 1989 to 1999
- Carlos Menem Jr. (1968–1995), son of Carlos Menem
- Eduardo Menem (born 1938), Argentine politician, brother of Carlos Menem
- Martín Menem (born 1975), Argentine politician, nephew of Carlos Menem
- Zulema María Eva Menem (born 1970), daughter of Carlos Menem
