= Yomagate =

1991 political scandal in Argentina

The Yomagate was a political scandal that took place in Argentina in 1991, during the government of Carlos Menem. The name combines the last name of the involved (Amira Yoma), and the suffix "Gate" of habitual use in journalism after the Watergate scandal (USA, 1972–1974).

== Description ==
The cause of Yomagate was an investigation of a cocaine trafficking operation. According to the investigation, large sums of drug money from the U.S. city of New York would have been destined to Argentina, to be laundered by various financial transactions, with the purchase of real estate, jewelry or entrepreneurship. Another portion of the money was to be diverted at the same time to Uruguay.

The cause of Yomagate involved the secretary and sister-in-law of then Argentine president Carlos Menem, her ex-husband Ibrahim al-Ibrahim (co-director of customs at the Ezeiza airport) and various notorious drug traffickers and launderers like Monzer al-Kassar.

Amira Yoma went under preventive detention, which was overruled by the head of the Chamber the Federal Criminal Court Luisa Riva Aramayo; the investigation was cancelled and the investigation cleared all suspects of all charges.

== See also ==
- Carlos Menem
- Alfredo Yabrán
- Monzer al-Kassar
