= Amira Yoma =

Argentine politician (born 1952)

Advisor to the Ministry of Labor
- In office 7 May 1999 – 22 May 1999

Advisor to the White Helmets Commission
- In office 18 August 1998 – 3 May 1999

Director of Hearings
- In office 8 July 1989 – 24 July 1991
- Succeeded by: Beatriz López

Personal details
- Born: Amalia Beatriz Yoma; 18 August 1952 (age 73) Nonogasta, Argentina
- Spouses: Ibrahim al Ibrahim (1986–1989); Jorge "Chacho" Marchetti
- Occupation: Political advisor, restaurateur

Amalia Beatriz "Amira" Yoma (born 18 August 1952) is an Argentine political advisor and restaurateur. She is best known for being the Director of Hearings in the presidential administration of her then brother-in-law Carlos Menem, and for being charged in the drug money laundering scandal which came to be called Yomagate.

Her nickname "Amira" means "princess" in Arabic. She is the youngest of eight siblings, including Emir and Zulema Yoma. Other notable members of her family are her cousin Jorge Yoma, her brother-in-law Carlos Menem, and her niece Zulema Menem.

== Biography ==
From ages 6 to 20, Amira Yoma lived in Damascus, Syria, where she would learn to speak Arabic. She returned at the request of her sister Zulema.

In 1983 she began working with Carlos Menem as Director of Hearings in La Rioja Province, then went on to hold a position at the provincial bank. In late 1986 she married Ibrahim al Ibrahim, and they lived in Wilde until 1989 when they moved to Buenos Aires. They divorced later that year.

Also in 1989, after Menem's election as president, Yoma would be designated Director of National Hearings, the most prominent office of the Casa Rosada after the president's. In the early years of the administration she was an emblematic figure in official meetings and among Menem's favorites. In 1991 she was forced to resign due to a drug money laundering scandal, which would also affect her ex-husband Ibrahim al Ibrahim, who was in charge of the Ezeiza customs office.

At the president's direction, several attempts were made to grant her some political function, one of which was denied by Guido di Tella, the Minister of Foreign Affairs. Yoma also called the FrePaSo deputy Graciela Fernández Meijide to request that her return to power not be fiercely criticized by the opposition.

In her declaration before the Senate on 1 December 1994, she would take responsibility for issuing a passport to arms dealer Monzer al-Kassar. In 1995 she married journalist Jorge "Chacho" Marchetti and, that same year, she would travel to Spain to meet with the Narcogate judge, Baltasar Garzón.

She was rarely interviewed on television, granting exceptions to Mirtha Legrand and Mariano Grondona.

After several years with a low profile, Yoma returned to the government in August 1998, when she was appointed as an advisor to the White Helmets Commission for six months. The government justified this appointment, which she celebrated on Legrand's program on 18 August 1998 and which carried a monthly salary of 1,730 pesos, based on her mastery of Arabic. Her strong personality brought her into conflict with White Helmets leader Octavio Frigerio, so she left the post. As a result, she asked her ex-brother-in-law to relocate her, and she was eventually hired by the then Ministry of Labor and Social Security. When she was discovered by the press in a new political position, she explained her hiring: "I do different things, but I cannot speak of them."

On 7 May 1999 she became part of the orbit of Antonio Erman González in the Ministry of Labor with a salary of 4,000 pesos. After this, according to her statement, she rejected a proposal to be an advisor to the Ministry of Social Development offered by then minister José Figueroa, "because it did not seem ethical to have another contract." She became unemployed after González resigned as minister.

She next moved to Marbella, where many Syrians lived, and where her husband "Chacho" Marchetti decided to open a restaurant. Despite this, four police officers continued to guard her house in the Buenos Aires neighborhood of Belgrano R, as it was said that she was on an official mission. The business closed due to a mad cow scare, and the couple returned to Buenos Aires.

== Yomagate or Narcogate ==
In the 1990s, Cali Cartel accountant Ramón Humberto Puentes was arrested in Punta del Este at the request of Spanish judge Baltasar Garzón, on suspicion of smuggling cocaine into Uruguay. Among his belongings was a hardcover notebook that exposed figures of Argentine power at the time. Amira Yoma was mentioned as moving a "cargo" from New York, in an entry reading "Amira 720 (– 50)".

After further investigation, the name of her then husband Ibrahim al Ibrahim, who had been appointed head of the customs office of Ezeiza by decree of Vice President Eduardo Duhalde, was also found, designated as having moved "7,559,000 dollars".

In several successive trips Amira Yoma moved to Uruguay a quantity of money impossible to quantify, hidden in the doors and body of a Peugeot 505 gray color truck.

— Extract from the Uruguayan court's file

On 1 March 1991, the Spanish magazine Cambio 16 published that Judge Garzón was investigating figures of power very close to Carlos Menem, including Amira Yoma, Ibrahim al Ibrahim, and Mario Caserta, Undersecretary of Public Services. According to an informant, the job of Yoma and Ibrahim was to pick up suitcases of money in New York and take them to Buenos Aires as sealed baggage, where they were then collected and taken to Uruguay.

In July 1992, Yoma was arrested and released on bail on the charge of bringing suitcases with "narco-dollars" into the country. Her case would eventually be dismissed by the Argentine court in April 1994 at the request of the prosecutor Carlos Stornelli and recorded by chamber secretary Gabriel Cavallo, despite the fact that the Spanish justice system continued with the international arrest warrant.

== 2004–present ==
Yoma was in court on another charge in 2004, this time for alleged irregularities in credits contracted by the family tannery Yoma SA, known as the Yoma Group, with national, provincial, and city banks. The family's entire case would be dismissed that September by federal judge Claudio Bonadio.

In November 2009 while Yoma was driving her car to a friend's house, she was intercepted and her vehicle was fired at twice before she escaped. Then, at 3:00 am, she received a phone call in which she was threatened. "Enough doing press. We're going to kill you. You are going to have to leave the country."

On a television program in October 2012, Yoma spoke about the incident with the suitcases:

The accusation was for 50 thousand dollars that I had taken. And that I brought in suitcases with dollars. But I brought suitcases with clothes. After that, I had to sign the resignation and then I did not leave my house anymore because I was ashamed.

Amira Yoma currently runs a Middle Eastern restaurant in the Buenos Aires neighborhood of Belgrano with her husband, former journalist Jorge "Chacho" Marchetti.
