= Yomi (disambiguation) =

Yomi may also refer to:

== Words ==
Yomi (黄泉) is the Japanese word for the underworld.

- Yomi (読み), meaning reading, such as the on'yomi and kun'yomi of kanji

== People ==
- Yomi Adegoke, British journalist and author
- Yomi Awoniyi, Nigerian architect and politician
- Yomi Bankole, Nigerian table tennis player
- Yomi Black, Nigerian actor
- Yomi Denzel, Swiss entrepreneur (1996)
- Yomi Fash Lanso, Nigerian actor (born 1968)
- Yomi Hirasaka, Japanese novelist
- Yomi Kasali, Nigerian minister
- Yomi Owope, Nigerian writer, TV presenter and communications specialist
- Yomi Scintu, German footballer

== Fictional characters ==
- Koyomi Mizuhara, a fictional character in the anime and manga series Azumanga Daioh nicknamed "Yomi"
- Yomi (YuYu Hakusho) (黄泉), a fictional character in the anime and manga series YuYu Hakusho.
- Yomi, an effeminate character in the manga Riki-Oh
- Yomi (ヨミ), a fictional character in the anime and manga series Babel II
- Yomi Isayama (黄泉), a fictional character in the manga series Ga-rei and the prequel anime series Ga-Rei: Zero
- Yomi (ヨミ), a fictional character in the anime and manga series Babel II
- Yomi Takeda (武田 詠深), a main character of the manga series Tamayomi
- Yomi (詠), a character of the game Senran Kagura

== Other uses ==
- Yomi (card game) a card game by David Sirlin

== See also ==
- Yom (disambiguation)
- Yoma (disambiguation)
