= Noticias (magazine) =

Argentine magazine

- Editorial Director: Gustavo González
- Categories: News
- Frequency: Weekly
- Publisher: Editorial Perfil
- Total circulation (2011): 58,000
- First issue: 17 November 1976
- Country: Argentina
- Language: Spanish

Noticias de la Semana (News of the Week) is a weekly newsmagazine published in Argentina, where it is known simply as Noticias (News). The magazine was founded by Jorge Fontevecchia in 1976 and published by him in a format similar to American publications such as Time or Newsweek. Noticias was known as La Semana (The Week) until 1989. The magazine is also known in Argentina for its loss of photojournalist José Luis Cabezas, who was murdered in 1997 on the orders of local shipping magnate Alfredo Yabrán.

The magazines is part of Editorial Perfil. Former President Néstor Kirchner reportedly ordered government advertising withheld from the magazine, as well from other media critical of his government, and privileged supporting media instead. Editorial Perfil sued the government regarding this, and the Court supported the magazine's claim. Chief of Staff Aníbal Fernández denied any discrimination against the publisher, a statement refuted by Perfil.

In 2014, Cardinal Mario Poli, archbishop of Buenos Aires, rejected the decision of the magazine, directed by Jorge Fontevecchia, to carry the image of the crucified president Cristina Kirchner on its cover.
