= Atilio Benedetti =

Argentine politician

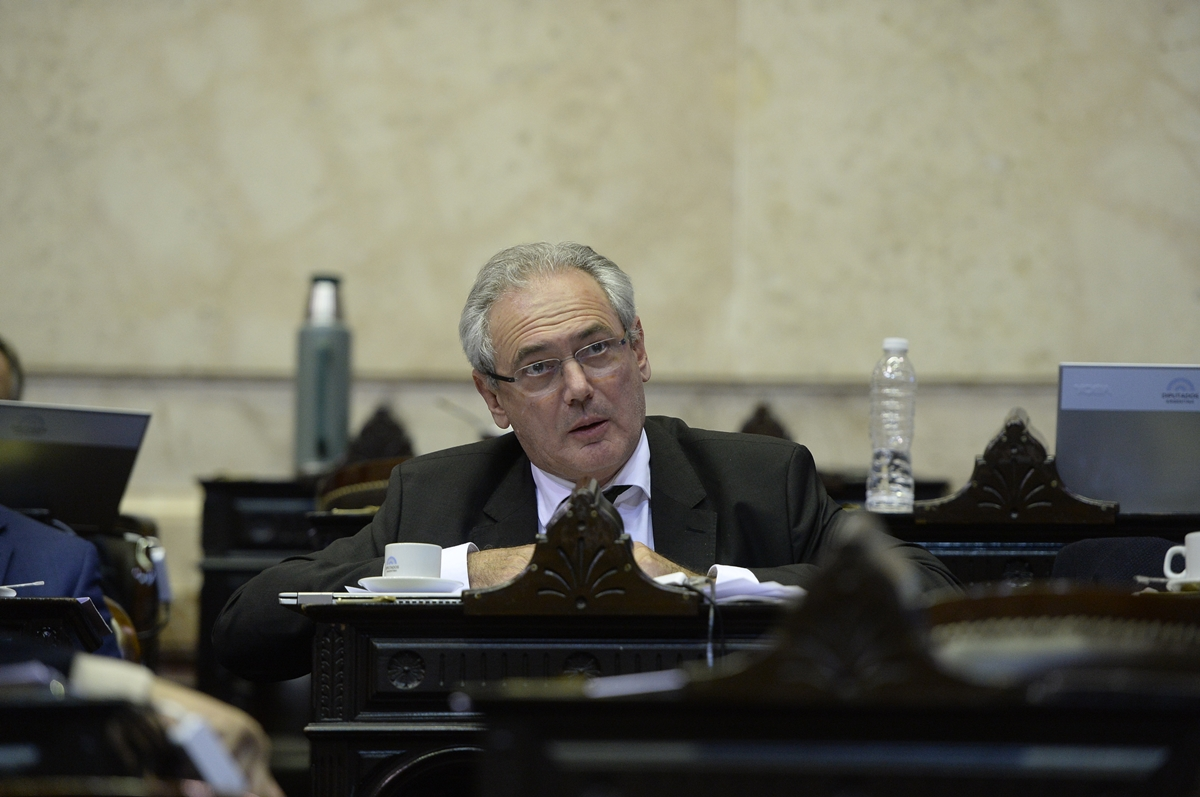

National Deputy
- In office 10 December 2017 – 10 December 2021
- Constituency: Entre Ríos
- In office 10 December 2009 – 10 December 2013
- Constituency: Entre Ríos

Mayor of Larroque
- In office 10 December 1995 – 10 December 1999

Personal details
- Born: 1 January 1955 (age 71) Larroque, Argentina
- Party: Radical Civic Union
- Other political affiliations: Social and Civic Agreement (2009–2013); Juntos por el Cambio (2015–present)
- Education: National University of Entre Ríos

Atilio Francisco Salvador Benedetti (born 1 January 1955) is an Argentine bromatologist, businessman and politician. A member of the Radical Civic Union, Benedetti served as intendente (mayor) of his hometown of Larroque from 1995 to 1999, and as a member of the board of directors of the Banco Nación from 2015 to 2017. Later, from 2017 to 2021, he served as a National Deputy.

Business-wise, Benedetti presides Tierra Greda S.A. and served as chairman of the Entre Ríos Stock Exchange. With a net worth of US$5.5 million (as of 2020), Benedetti was wealthiest member of the Argentine Congress during his tenure.

== Early and personal life ==
Benedetti was born on 1 January 1955 in Larroque, a small city in Southern Entre Ríos. He studied bromatology (food science) at the National University of Entre Ríos, graduating in 1978. Benedetti is married to María Cristina Cháves, and has three children.

== Career ==
Benedetti's political career began in the Juventud Radical, the youth wing of the Radical Civic Union (UCR). In 1983, following the return of democracy to Argentina, he was elected to the City Council of Larroque. In 1995, he was elected to the mayoralty of the city. Benedetti has also served in a number of posts within the Radical Civic Union, most notably as member of the Provincial Committee of Entre Ríos (from 2000 to 2002) and as president of the Entre Ríos Provincial Congress from 2006 to 2008.

=== National Deputy ===
Benedetti rose to prominence during the 2008 agrarian strike. As a major stakeholder in agrarian businesses, Benedetti positioned himself as a staunch opponent of President Cristina Fernández de Kirchner's proposed raise on tariffs for agricultural products. Following the conflict, Benedetti ran for one of Entre Ríos' seats in the Chamber of Deputies, heading the Social and Civic Agreement list. The list was the most voted in Entre Ríos, with 35.01% of the vote, and Benedetti was easily elected. He was sworn in on 4 December 2009. He was one of the 11 so-called "agro-deputies" elected in 2009. He did not run for re-election in 2013.

Benedetti ran for a second term in the 2017 legislative election, this time heading the Cambiemos list. The list was the most voted in the province, with 53.02% of the vote, and Benedetti was elected.

In 2010, as a national deputy, Benedetti voted against the Equal Marriage Law, which legalised same-sex marriage in Argentina. He was a supporter of the legalisation of abortion in Argentina, voting in favour of the two Voluntary Interruption of Pregnancy bills that were debated by the Argentine Congress in 2018 and 2020.

Ahead of the 2021 primary election, Benedetti was confirmed as one of the candidates in the "Juntos" list in Entre Ríos. He was the fifth candidate in the JxC list that competed in the general election, and he was not re-elected.

=== 2019 gubernatorial run ===
Benedetti ran for the governorship of Entre Ríos in the 2019 provincial election; he was Cambiemos's candidate, with deputy Gustavo Hein as his running mate. The Benedetti–Hein ticket received 35.57% of the vote, losing to incumbent governor Gustavo Bordet of the Justicialist Party, who received 57.43% of the vote.
