= Eduardo Menem =

Argentine politician

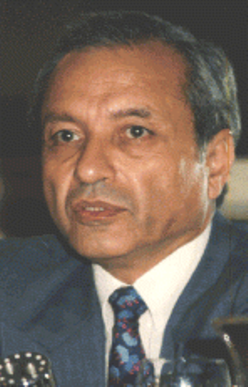
- Menem in 1997

National Senator
- In office 10 December 1983 – 9 December 2005
- Succeeded by: Carlos Menem
- Constituency: La Rioja

Personal details
- Born: 30 April 1938 (age 87) Anillaco, La Rioja, Argentina
- Party: Justicialist Party
- Children: Martín Menem
- Relatives: Carlos Menem (brother)
- Profession: Lawyer

Eduardo Menem (born 30 April 1938) is an Argentine Justicialist Party politician. He is a former Senator and the brother of former President Carlos Menem.

Born to a family of Syrian origin in Anillaco, Menem was elected Senator for La Rioja Province for four terms (1983-1989, 1989–1995, 1995–2001, 2001-2005). He served as provisional President of the Senate between 1989 and 1999, holding executive power on many occasions during trips abroad by the President, in the absence of a vice-President after the resignation of Eduardo Duhalde. He also worked as president of the Constitutional Assembly that enacted the 1994 amendment of the Argentine Constitution.

After leaving the Congress, he joined the internal line of the PJ that opposes Kirchnerism. Despite not being part of the Congress, he supported the actions of Julio Cobos in 2010, which were criticized by Néstor and Cristina Kirchner.

== Books ==
- "Nueve años en el Congreso de la Nación" (English: Nine years in the National Congress), 1992
- "La Constitución reformada" (English: The Constitution amended), 1994
- "Los Derechos de la mujer" (English: Women's rights), 2005
