= Yōma =

Yōma or Youma may refer to:

- Yōma (洋間), a Japanese architectural term for a room in Western style; see Washitsu
- Yōma (妖魔), one of several Japanese words for monster; see Yaoguai
- Youma (town) (油麻镇), in Guiping, Guangxi, China
- Youma Diakite (born 1971), Malian model and television personality

== See also ==
- Yoma (disambiguation)
