= State reform law =

The state reform law (Spanish: Ley de reforma del estado) was sanctioned on August 17, 1989, in Argentina, during the presidency of Carlos Menem. It allowed the privatization of state enterprises, and the fusion or disbanding of state organizations. It was proposed by the Justicialist Party and got the support of the Union of the Democratic Centre.

== Bibliography ==
- Romero, Luis Alberto (2013) [1994]. A History of Argentina in the Twentieth Century. United States: The Pennsylvania University Press. ISBN 978-0-271-06228-0.
