= Gustavo Hein =

Argentine politician

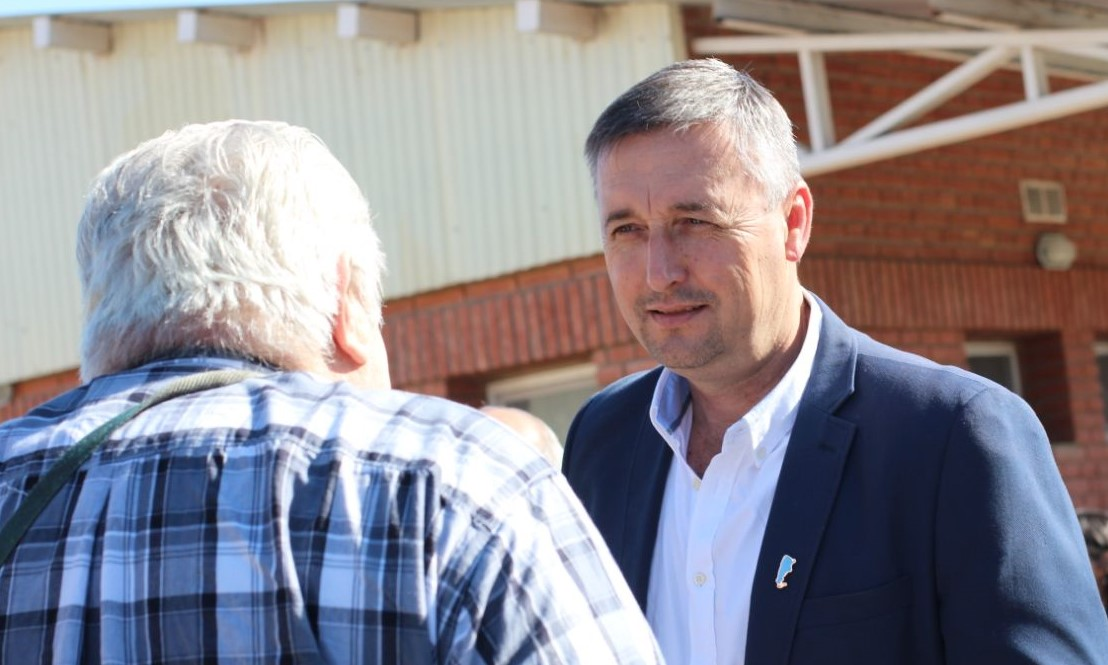

National Deputy
- Incumbent
- Assumed office 10 December 2019
- Constituency: Entre Ríos

Mayor of Basavilbaso
- In office 10 December 2015 – 10 December 2019
- Preceded by: Silvio Valenzuela
- Succeeded by: Hernán Bessel

Personal details
- Born: 27 May 1972 (age 53) Basavilbaso, Argentina
- Party: Republican Proposal
- Other political affiliations: Juntos por el Cambio (2015–present)

Gustavo René Hein (born 27 May 1972) is an Argentine politician currently serving as a National Deputy elected in 2019. A member of Republican Proposal (PRO), and the party's president in Entre Ríos Province, Hein previously served as intendente (mayor) of Basavilbaso, Entre Ríos, from 2015 to 2019.

== Career ==
Hein first ran for office in 2015, when he was a candidate for mayor of his hometown of Basavilbaso for the Cambiemos alliance, which grouped the PRO, the UCR and other political forces. He faced off and won against former mayor Fabián Flores, of the Justicialist Party. His administration of Basavilbaso received the "National Quality Prize" in 2018.

In 2017, Hein became president of the Entre Ríos chapter of PRO, following a long-lasting judicial intervention on the party led by then-interior minister Rogelio Frigerio. Hein's term as party president ended in 2020, when new party elections took place and a new candidate, Eduardo Caminal (who counted with supported from both Hein and Frigerio) took office.

=== National Deputy ===
Near the end of his first term as mayor, in the 2019 legislative election, Hein ran for one of Entre Ríos' seats in the Chamber of Deputies as the second candidate in the Juntos por el Cambio list, behind Gabriela Mabel Lena. The list was the most voted in Entre Ríos, with 45.72% of the vote, both Lena and Hein were elected. He was sworn in on 4 December 2019 and formed part of the Juntos por el Cambio parliamentary inter-bloc.

As a national deputy, Hein formed part of the parliamentary commissions on Budgets and Finances, Small and Medium-sized Enterprises, Maritime Interests, Agriculture and Livestock, Internal Security, and Co-operative Affairs and NGOs. Owing to his faith, he was a vocal opponent of the legalisation of abortion in Argentina. He voted against the Voluntary Interruption of Pregnancy bill debated by the Argentine Congress in 2020, which eventually passed and went on to legalise abortion in 2021. Hein was also one of 7 deputies to who abstained on the trans labour quota bill passed by the Chamber in 2021.

=== 2019 gubernatorial run ===
Hein was the running mate of the UCR's Atilio Benedetti for the governorship of Entre Ríos in the 2019 provincial election as part of the Cambiemos alliance. The Benedetti–Hein ticket received 35.57% of the vote, losing to incumbent governor Gustavo Bordet of the Justicialist Party, who received 57.43% of the vote.

== Personal life ==
Hein was born on 27 May 1972 in Basavilbaso, Entre Ríos Province. He is married and has two children. Hein is an Evangelical Christian.

In 2019, Hein's private residence was subject to an arson attack allegedly by a neighbour. Nationwide PRO leader Patricia Bullrich initially attributed the attack on a Kirchnerist activist, but Hein and his attorneys later clarified the attacker had been stalking him for three years and that the man in question had no evident political affiliation, but rather acted out of personal reasons. The arsonist was later sentenced to three years in prison.
