= José Luis Cabezas =

Argentine news photographer and reporter

- Press pass photo of Cabezas
- Born: November 28, 1961; Wilde, Buenos Aires
- Disappeared: 25 January 1997; Pinamar
- Status: Dead
- Died: January 25, 1997 (aged 35); General Madariaga
- Cause of death: Photographing the gangster Alfredo Yabrán
- Monuments: No se olviden de Cabezas in Colegiales, Buenos Aires
- Occupations: Journalist, Photographer
- Employer: Noticias magazine
- Spouse: María Cristina Robledo
- Children: Agustina, Juan, Candela
- Relatives: Gladys Cabezas

José Luis Cabezas (Wilde, Buenos Aires, 28 November 1961 – General Madariaga, 25 January 1997) was an Argentine news photographer and reporter who worked for Noticias, a leading local newsmagazine. The case of Cabezas gained widespread attention after he was kidnapped and killed by people hired by Alfredo Yabrán in retaliation for having taken a photo of him in Pinamar –a seaside resort in Atlantic Coast– in February 1996. The photo, which displayed Yabrán and his wife, was published on the cover of Noticias magazine in March 1996, unveiling Yabrán's face to public.

The murder of Cabezas was widely covered by the Argentine media and was a shock not only for the society but for some of the most renowned politicians of that time, which had close ties with Yabrán.

== Kidnapping and murder ==
On 25 January 1997, Cabezas was murdered at Pinamar, Argentina's most exclusive beach resort on the Atlantic Ocean, visited by politicians, businessmen, actors, sports figures and other celebrities.

Cabezas was kidnapped after being the first to make public photographs of Alfredo Yabrán, a postal service mogul. He was beaten, handcuffed, tortured, and taken to a pit in the countryside where he was fatally shot twice in the head. His body was placed inside a vehicle rented by Noticias, and burned.

The murder occurred during the provincial government of Eduardo Duhalde in the Province of Buenos Aires, and was seen as a possible criminal message from the police in the province of Buenos Aires area to its management, "They threw a corpse at me" said shortly after the event the President Carlos Saul Menem, who had promised to clarify the case, but there was strong criticism of him by the way the research was carried out and because of his close links with Alfredo Yabrán himself.

It also happened just as the press in Argentina enjoyed the best public image. Noticias was and is still known for its exposures of allegedly corrupt individuals and institutions. The murder of Cabezas was viewed as an attack on independent journalism by those institutions. The media, journalist associations, human rights groups and many lay people took to the streets to ask for swift justice; there were marches, caravans of vehicles and trains, public rallies, all sorts of homages, photo expositions. A popular slogan, No se olviden de Cabezas ("Don't forget Cabezas") became the symbol for this need of justice and a warning for those unaware of the people's frustration with impunity.

== Investigation ==
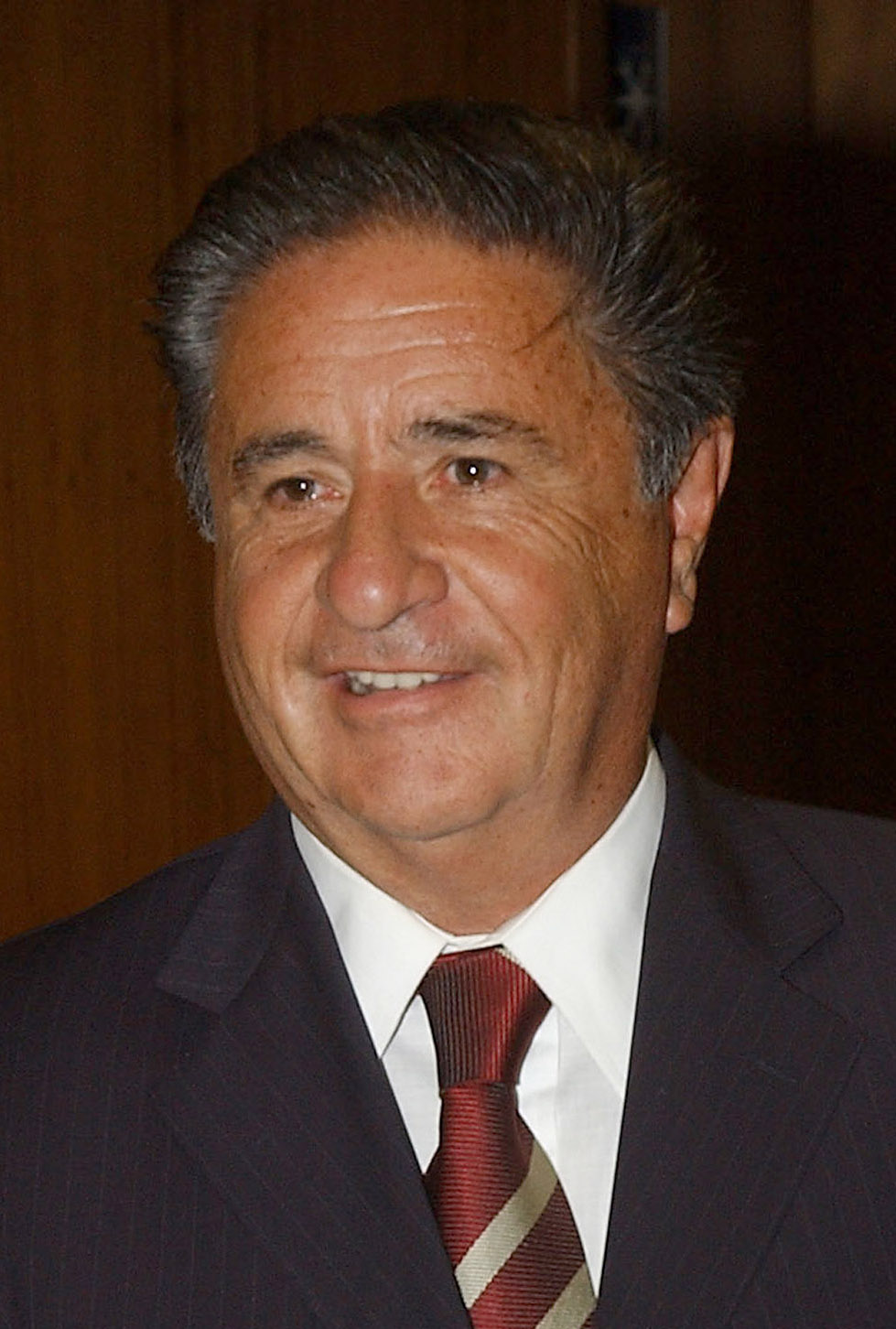
Governor of Buenos Aires, Eduardo Duhalde, was questioned about his responsibility in the activities of the Provincial Police

The investigation led, on the one hand, to the detention of five people linked to the owner of a brothel at Mar del Plata's port (they were known as Los Pepitos). On the other hand, a police informant called Carlos Redruello, a police officer called Gustavo Prellezo and four minors from La Plata area (called Los Horneros) were taken in custody. In each case the public largely believed that these people were being used as scapegoats, in order to cover up maneuvers by Buenos Aires Province Governor Eduardo Duhalde. Prellezo was linked to two other policemen, Sergio Cammarata and Aníbal Luna, who had been shadowing Cabezas, and were also detained. Prellezo's wife, Silvia Belawsky (also a police officer), was revealed to have requested background information on Cabezas a few weeks before the crime.

Two distinct lines of investigation took shape. One focused on Buenos Aires Provincial Police (Policía Bonaerense); the other on one of the prominent businessman Alfredo Yabrán.

Noticias published an investigation about the, alleging that Buenos Aires police's practices were plagued with corruption and illegal violence, and that they had ties to prostitution, drug trafficking, and illegal gambling. The title of this article, Maldita Policía ("Damned Police"), became the nickname of the Police service in the media.

Alfredo Yabrán allowed no one to take photos of him, and was proud to claim that not even the intelligence services had one, even though he was one of the most notorious businessmen on Argentina. He had good relations with the government and a way to eliminate competition. Several journalists who had tried to get into Yabrán's secrets had been threatened or attacked.

In 1996, José Luis Cabezas took a picture of Yabrán in Pinamar and Noticias published it, along with news about his businesses. In 1997, Cabezas and his fellow journalist Gabriel Michi continued the investigation, ultimately trying to get an interview. Cabezas and Michi then began to see signs that their research was bothering Yabrán. The murder took place a few days later.

=== Sentence and further development ===
The trial conducted on February 2, 2000, condemned to life imprisonment all the eight members of the band called "Los Horneros": Horacio Braga, Joseph Auge, Sergio González, Héctor Retana and Gregorio Ríos, Sergio Camaratta, Aníbal Luna and Gustavo Aníbal Prellezo, but currently they have all been released.

Gustavo Prellezo, a former officer and inspector of the Buenos Aires police, was sentenced to life imprisonment, but granted house arrest on 23 September 2010 on the basis of having a hernia injury.

Miguel Retana, convicted, died in prison. He was the only member convicted that confessed and accused Gustavo Prellezo of being both, the leader and shooter.

- Sergio Aníbal Camaratta, a policeman from Pinamar, was sentenced to life imprisonment, but was later released after paying a 40,000 pesos bail. He currently works in a security firm in pinamar called "Servicio Organizado de Seguridad" (SOS) (which he denied). The agency, owned by the owners of the Constructora del Bosque, is in the name of Silvia Melgarejo Rosana, wife of Camaratta who drive around pinamar in a brand new Toyota 4x4 and a Jeep even if he claims to be unemployed.

Aníbal Luna, was sentenced to life imprisonment but was released and is also working in pinamar in the security firm Servicio Organizado de Seguridad (SOS).

- Gregorio Rios, head of custody and close friend of Alfredo Yabrán, was sentenced as an instigator of the crime and been denied release in December 2006, his life sentence of 27 years finally ended in house arrest.

José Luis Auge was convicted, and released in 2004.

Sergio Gustavo González was sentenced to life imprisonment, but in February 2006 he was released by reduction of sentence to 20 years.

Horacio Anselmo Braga was sentenced to 18 years and was released on January 25, 2007. Several factors influenced his release, per example: he was benefited from the "2 for 1" (subtract 2 years for each year sentence processing), scored well in psychiatric reports presented good conduct and paid a deposit of 20,000 pesos to exit the Penitentiary number 9. That same day, 6,000 people gathered in Pinamar in seeking justice for Cabezas.

Alberto Gómez, Commissioner of Pinamar, was convicted after being accused of having "liberated the area" where the crime occurred

== Popular culture ==
=== Documentaries ===
In May 2022, Netflix premiered the documentary film The Photographer: Murder in Pinamar, directed by Alejandro Hartmann, presenting the Cabezas Case and its aftermath in 1990s Argentina.
