= Anillaco =

Coordinates: 28°48′S 66°56′W

- Municipality and village
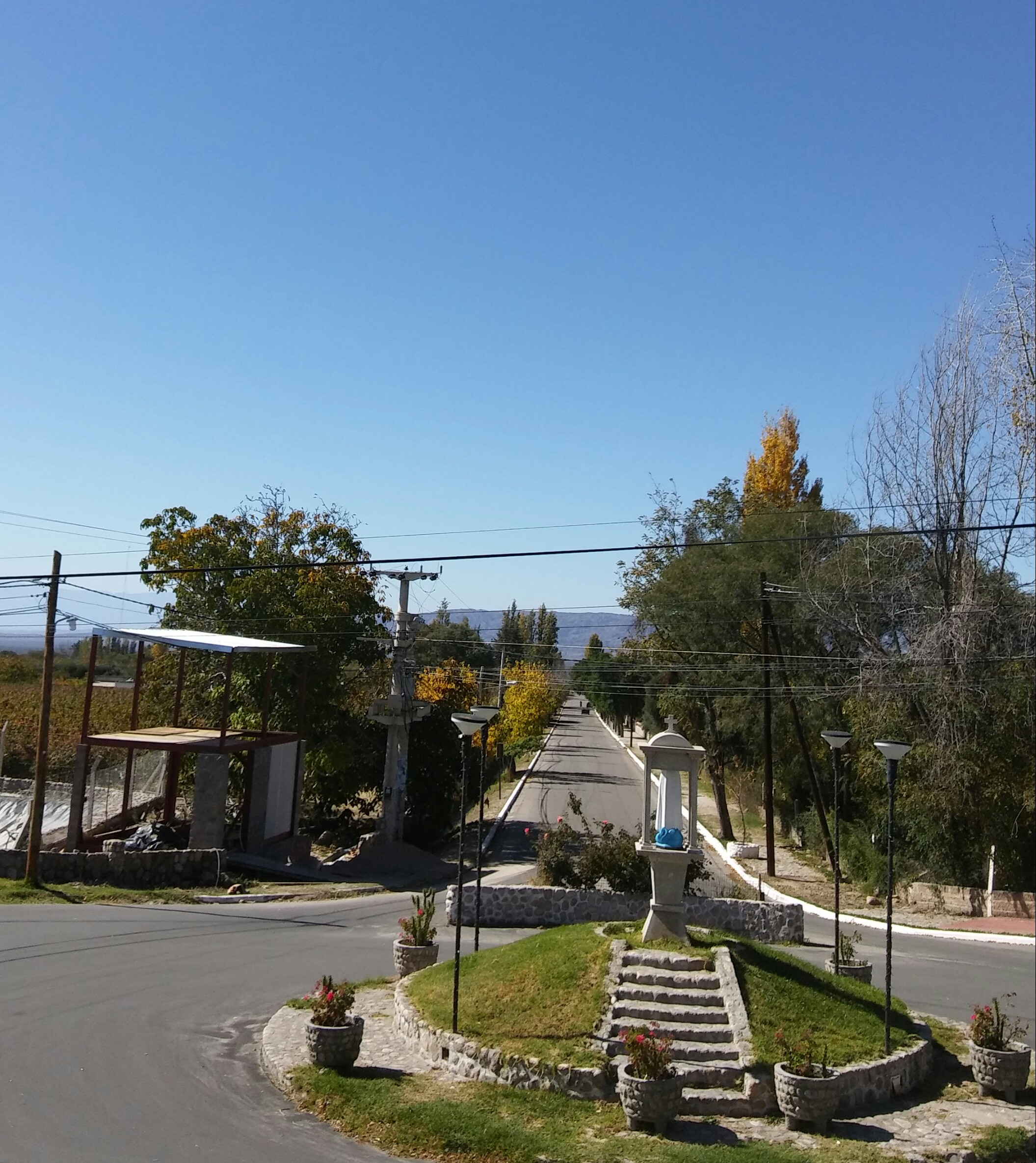
- Anillaco roundabout
- Interactive map of Anillaco
- Country: Argentina
- Province: La Rioja Province
- Time zone: UTC−3 (ART)
- Climate: BWk

Anillaco is a municipality and village in La Rioja Province in northwestern Argentina. It is the birthplace of former president of Argentina Carlos Menem.
