= Zulema María Eva Menem =

Argentine politician (born 1970)

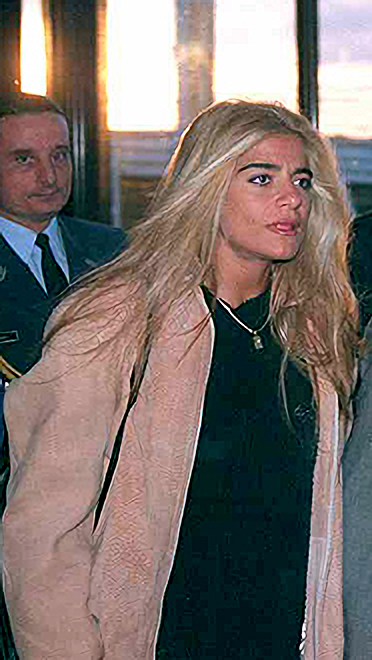
- Menem in 1997

First Lady of Argentina
- In role 26 April 1995 – 10 December 1999
- President: Carlos Menem
- Preceded by: Zulema Fátima Yoma de Menem
- Succeeded by: Inés Pertiné Urien

Personal details
- Born: 25 December 1970 (age 55) La Rioja, Argentina
- Spouse: Paolo Bertoldi (m. 2003)
- Children: 2
- Parent(s): Carlos Menem; Zulema Fátima Yoma
- Relatives: Carlos Menem Jr. (Brother)

Zulema María Eva Menem (Arabic :زوليما ماريا إيفا منعم) (born 25 December 1970) is an Argentine politician who replaced her mother in the role of First Lady at formal occasions after the latter separated in 1991 from her father, President of Argentina Carlos Menem. Menem was born in La Rioja Province.

To avoid confusion with her mother, Zulema Fátima Yoma, since both could be called "Zulema Menem", the media refers to her as Zulemita.

== Biography ==
Zulemita initially appeared in gossip magazines as the daughter of the President. She began to perform protocol work after her parents divorced. Zulemita accepted the first lady role. She received decorations from the kings of Spain and Sweden.

Zulemita broke her relationship with her father after his marriage to Chilean Cecilia Bolocco. This marriage affected her inheritance due to the subsequent birth of Máximo Saul Menem.
