= Jorge Yoma =

Argentine politician (b. 1953)

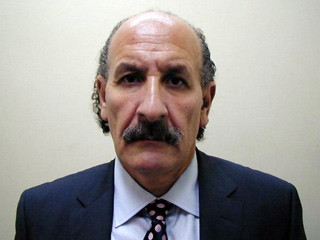

National Deputy
- In office December 10, 2009 – December 10, 2013
- Constituency: La Rioja
- In office December 10, 1989 – December 10, 1993
- Constituency: La Rioja
- In office July 19, 1989 – December 10, 1989
- Preceded by: Julio Corzo
- Succeeded by: Bernardo Eligio Herrera
- Constituency: La Rioja

Ambassador of Argentina to Mexico
- In office December 10, 2007 – December 10, 2009
- Preceded by: Oscar Guillermo Galie
- Succeeded by: Patricia Vaca Narvaja

Ambassador of Argentina to Peru
- In office May 10, 2018 – December 10, 2019
- Preceded by: Ana María Ramírez
- Succeeded by: Carlos Álvarez

National Senator
- In office December 10, 1995 – December 10, 2005
- Constituency: La Rioja

Councilor of Magistracy
- In office November 12, 2001 – November 12, 2005
- Appointed by: National Senate
- In office May 30, 1994 – August 22, 1994
- Appointed by: La Rioja

Minister of Government and Justice of La Rioja
- In office 1995–1995
- Governor: Bernabé Arnaudo

Personal details
- Born: November 10, 1953 (age 72) Chilecito, Argentina
- Party: ERF (since 2021); Justicialist Party (until 2021)
- Relatives: Amira Yoma (cousin)
- Education: National University of Córdoba

Jorge Raúl Yoma (born November 10, 1953) is an Argentine politician and lawyer who served as both a national deputy and senator on various occasions, as well as positions in the province of La Rioja. He was Argentine ambassador to Mexico between 2007 and 2010. In March 2018, he was appointed by President Mauricio Macri as Argentine ambassador to Peru.

== Career ==
He was twice a National Representative for province of La Rioja, first between 1989 and 1993, and later between 2009 and 2013. In addition, he was a National Senator for that province between 2001 and 2005. While he held that position, he was a member of the Judicial Council.

In his last stage as a deputy he chaired the committees on Constitutional Affairs of the Chamber of Deputies of the Nation, on Constitutional Affairs of the Honorable Senate of the Nation and the Bicameral Commission "City of Buenos Aires".

He was Minister of Government and Justice of La Rioja in 1995.

He was national councilor of the Justicialist Party (PJ), normalizing controller of the PJ of Tucumán in 1993 and 1994, and president of the National Electoral Board of that party.

He was president of the Frente con Todos Party of La Rioja and of the Lema Riojano por el Trabajo y la Producción in La Rioja in 2003.

== Ambassador to Mexico (2007–2009) ==
Appointed Ambassador to Mexico in 2007, he moved the Embassy and Consulate General of Argentina from the building where a bank with Canadian capital operated. In Mexico City he organized the "Argentine Week of Historical Recognition of the Mexican People", for which he placed a plaque at the entrance thanking Mexican hospitality during the Argentine exile due to dictatorships.

Months before the 2001 crisis, Senator Jorge Yoma presented a bill to repeal the decrees that established, among other measures, a reduction in the salaries of state employees promoted by the Minister of Labour Patricia Bullrich. They demanded that the Alliance Government begin a dialogue between the ruling party and the opposition as soon as possible and call for social consultation. Also as senator, Yoma promoted, from the presidency of Constitutional Affairs of the Upper House, the regulations of the Bicameral Commission that will be responsible for endorsing or rejecting the decrees of the Executive and moving forward with a project to regulate decrees of necessity and urgency.

=== Projects ===
In his capacity as deputy and together with Diana Conti, he presented a project to reform the Electoral Code to allow voluntary voting for young people from 16 years of age. Yoma had already promoted a similar initiative when he was a senator in 1997. If the initiative is approved, it would be effective from 2013. "Statistics indicate that around 1,500,000 young people would be added to the electoral roll; about 750,000 each year," Yoma told Télam. As references he uses countries like Brazil, Nicaragua, Cuba and Ecuador.

He held the presidency of the Transportation Commission and the Bicameral Commission of Agreements of the Legislative Assembly, the vice-presidency of the Culture and Social Media Commission and was a member of the Environment and Natural Resources commissions.

== Controversies ==
In mid-2010 he had a clash with the American rabbi Eli Meir Libersohn, who had purchased 200 thousand hectares of land in Valle Hermoso, west of La Rioja, whom he accused (without naming him) of illicit enrichment and money laundering.
