= Yoma Central =

Development project in Myanmar

- Interactive map of Yoma Central
- Location: Downtown Yangon, Myanmar
- Coordinates: 16.780222251968844°N 96.15784036135761°E
- Status: under consturstion
- Groundbreaking: 2017, Jan. 16
- Estimated completion: 2026
- Demolished: 2 old FMI center buildings
- Website: yomacentral.com

Companies
- Architect: Cecil Balmond OBE
- Developer: Yoma Land

Technical details
- Cost: 700$million
- Buildings: 4towers and 1three storied building
- Size: 9.5 acres (3.8 ha)
- Leasable area: 2,440,000 square feet (227,000 m^{2})
- No. of residents: 112apartments at peninsula resident

Yoma Central is a major mixed-use development project in Downtown Yangon, Myanmar, located at the intersection of Bogyoke Aung San Road and Sule Pagoda Road, beside Bogyoke Aung San Market. The development entails a number of buildings, including the historic Myanma Railway headquarters first built in 1877, two new office towers, luxury residencies, and a business hotel. The development will eventually encompass 2,440,000 square feet (227,000 m^{2}). Groundbreaking was held on 16 January 2017. Following the 2021 Myanmar coup d'état, construction of the site, including a hotel, was paused in June 2021.

The build–operate–transfer project is being developed on land owned by Myanma Railways. The project is being developed by a joint venture comprising Yoma Strategic (48%), FMI (12%), Mitsubishi (30%), the Asian Development Bank (5%), and the International Finance Corporation (5%).

== Controversies ==
The focal point of Yoma Central, the former Myanma Railways headquarters, is listed on Yangon City Heritage List, meaning it cannot be modified or demolished without approval. The developers nonetheless gutted the building's interior, leaving only the external facade intact. Further work in July 2018 caused the collapse of an exterior wall. The developer's approach to conservation has been criticized by the Yangon Heritage Trust.

Yoma Central has also been the source of ongoing labor disputes. In March 2020, construction workers at the site protested the lack of paid leave during the Thingyan holiday. In January 2021, hundreds of Yoma Central construction workers protested the late payment of wages and unpaid social security allowances.

== See also ==
- Yangon
