= Alfredo Yabrán =

Argentine businessman (1944–1998)

- Born: 1 November 1944; Larroque, Entre Rios, Argentina
- Died: 20 May 1998 (aged 53)
- Occupation: Businessman

Alfredo Enrique Nalib Yabrán (1 November 1944 – 20 May 1998) was a businessman in Argentina, with close links with the government, in particular with the administration of Carlos Saúl Menem. Yabrán killed himself while facing arrest for suspected involvement in the murder of photojournalist José Luis Cabezas.

== Biography ==
Yabrán was born in Larroque, province of Entre Rios, in 1944, the seventh son of Nallib Miguel Yabrán and Emilia Tufic Marpez, both children of Lebanese immigrants.

He moved to Buenos Aires in the early '60s, as he began to do business in the areas of security and banking transactions. In the '70s, he became one of the main shareholders of Ocasa, and at the end of President Raúl Alfonsín's term he began to operate airport security in Ezeiza.

His name became known due to allegations of the former economy minister Domingo Cavallo. At a session of the Congress in 1995, the then finance minister denounced Yabrán as a kind of mafia boss with political and judicial protection. Yabrán, currently known by the general public, was largely unknown at the time and the press did not have any pictures of him.

Legally, Yabrán only declared a few companies, but Cavallo accused him of driving, through proxies, other major companies. Among them, Correo OCA (which handled 30% of the Argentine postal market), Ocasa (which Yabrán claimed to have sold ), Ciccone Calcográfica (a print and minting company that printed the Patacones Bonaerenses in the 2001 recession) and a transport and logistics company called Villalonga Furlong. These companies were sold to the Exxel Group for $605 million.

The main accusation against Yabrán was that their transport and security companies were being used to hide drugs, weapons trafficking, and money laundering.

Among other things, he owned the private courier company OCASA, and the immense 2,723,269 sq ft (253,000.0 m^{2}) - of which 645,834 sq ft (59,999.9 m^{2}) are covered - EDCADASSA warehouses at the Ezeiza international airport in Buenos Aires.

When his name became known due to allegations of former economy minister Domingo Cavallo, Yabrán was extremely secretive and jealous of his privacy. After the murder of photojournalist José Luis Cabezas, who had been investigating Yabrán, he was forced to come out in public and face the suspicions of society.

=== Close links with Menem's government ===
The killing of Cabezas embarrassed President Carlos Menem's government while Menem admitted that Emir Yoma was Alfredo Yabrán's friend, he denied that Yabran knew him.

His former wife Zulema Yoma insisted that they were close friends, and was proven right when it was found out that Yabran had given Menem a mansion in Buenos Aires as a marriage gift.

Justice Minister Elias Jassan had to resign over the 102 calls he personally made to Yabran and because of the calls that he had with Yabran's bodyguards the day after the murder of Cabezas.

Cabinet Minister Jorge Rodriguez was criticised for receiving Yabran in the Casa Rosada.

=== Suicide ===
In 1998, Yabrán was found dead in one of his houses, with a gunshot through his face which left him nearly unrecognisable.
