= Larroque, Entre Ríos =

Larroque
- Municipality and city
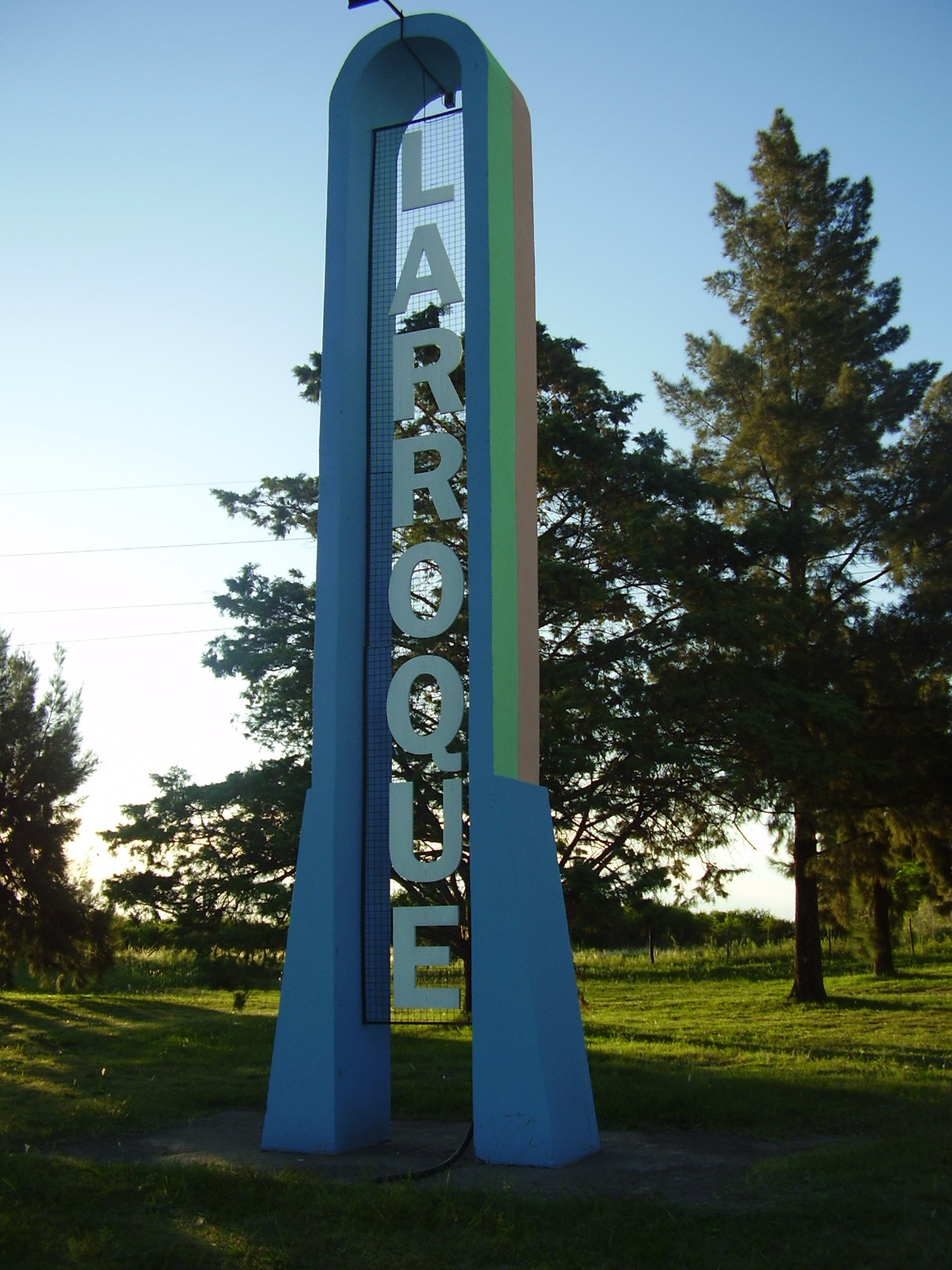
- Larroque, Entre Rios, Argentina

- Location within Argentina
- Coordinates: 33°02′00″S 59°01′00″W
- Country: Argentina
- Province: Entre Ríos
- Department: Gualeguaychú Department
- Founded: 1 December 1909

Government
  - Intendant: Francisco Benedetti (Cambiemos)

Population (2010 census)
  - Total: 6,451
- Time zone: UTC−3 (ART)

Larroque is a city in the Entre Ríos Province, in north-eastern Argentina. It is located on the South of the province, between Gualeguay and Gualeguaychú. It has a population of 6,451 according to the 2010 Census.

== History ==
Larroque was officially founded in 1909, when the train station of the same name of the General Urquiza Railway was inaugurated. The first settlers had established there in the 19th century, when the place was known as Kilometer 23. It is a municipality of first class since 1986.

== Notable people ==
- Annemarie Heinrich, photographer.
- María Esther de Miguel, writer.
- Alfredo Yabrán, businessman.
- Agustín Velotti, tennis player.
- Gastón Benedetti Taffarel, football/soccer player.
