= Monzer al-Kassar =

Syrian-born arms dealer

- منذر الكسار
- Born: 1945 (age 80–81); Hama, Syria
- Other name: "Prince of Marbella"
- Occupation: Arms dealer
- Spouse: Raghdaa Habbal
- Relatives: Ghassan
- Criminal charges: Selling arms
- Penalty: 30 years imprisonment

Monzer al-Kassar (Arabic: منذر الكسار) (born in 1945), also known as the "Prince of Marbella", is a Syrian arms dealer. He has been connected to numerous crimes, including the Achille Lauro hijacking and the Iran-Contra scandal. On 20 November 2008, he was convicted in U.S. federal court as part of a U.S. government sting, for agreeing to sell arms to undercover agents posing as suppliers for the Revolutionary Armed Forces of Colombia (FARC), a Colombian guerrilla organization. He was sentenced to thirty years' imprisonment.

== Early years ==
Al-Kassar was born in Hama and grew up in the nearby town of Nebek. His father was a lawyer and diplomat who at various times was Syria's ambassador to Canada and India.

According to U.S. authorities, Monzer's mentor in the drug and arms trade was his older brother, Ghassan, who had begun selling drugs in the late 1960s. Ghassan remained in the arms business until his death of natural causes in 2009.

Al-Kassar attended law school in the late 1960s.

According to a 2009 report by the United States Congress, Monzer al-Kassar supplied weapons and military equipment to armed groups engaged in violent conflicts in Nicaragua, Brazil, Cyprus, Bosnia, Croatia, Somalia, Iran and Iraq. In 1970, al-Kassar had his first Interpol-recorded arrest, for theft, in Trieste, Italy.

== United Kingdom ==
In the early 1970s, Al-Kassar resided in London, including the Sloane Square area. During this time, he was reportedly involved in international trading activities, including the import and export of various goods. In 1982, he married Raghdaa Habbal, who came from a well-connected Syrian family in Beirut.

== "The Prince of Marbella" ==
After his expulsion from the UK, al-Kassar moved, along with his wife and by then two children, to Marbella, Spain. There he bought a mansion, that he named "Palacio de Mifadil" ("Palace of My Virtue", in a combination of Spanish and Arabic), and quickly developed a reputation as a wealthy, ostentatious businessman. The European press soon began to call him "The Prince of Marbella". In 1985 he was the subject of a profile in the French magazine Paris Match, which wrote, "in a few years, this Syrian merchant became one of the most powerful businessmen in the world."

The Spanish government alleges that in 1985, al-Kassar sold arms to the hijackers of the Achille Lauro cruise ship, and that afterwards he flew the hijackers' leader, Abu Abbas, to safety in one of his private airplanes. Al-Kassar has denied the charge. In 1995, a court in Madrid acquitted Al-Kassar of all charges related to the hijacking.

In 1987, investigations into the Iran-Contra scandal found that al-Kassar had been paid 1.5 million GBP by someone in the U.S. government to sell arms to Nicaraguan Contras; according to an article in The New Yorker, the money came from "a Swiss bank account controlled by Oliver North and his co-conspirators."

In 1992, al-Kassar made arms sales valued in the millions of USD to Croatia, Bosnia and Somalia, violating United Nations arms embargoes to all three countries. That same year, al-Kassar obtained an Argentine passport, with the alleged plan to move there, with the assistance of then-president Carlos Menem, whose parents were from the same town in Syria as those of al-Kassar, and who may have been a relative. (In 2000, he was indicted in Argentina for "obtaining documents under false pretences".) Also in 1992, the Spanish government arrested him for his alleged earlier involvement in the Achille Lauro hijacking, along with "falsification of documents" and "possession of illegal weapons and vehicles". He spent more than a year in jail before being released on bail. The trial came in 1995, and he was found not guilty on all charges.

In July 2006, the government of Iraq placed him at No. 26 on their "most wanted" list, calling him "one of the main sources of financial and logistics support" for the Iraqi insurgency.

== DEA sting ==
After the September 11 attacks in 2001, there was renewed interest in the United States in apprehending those connected to terrorism, as well as new laws that gave greater power for "extraterritorial jurisdiction", or the ability of the U.S. government to investigate and arrest people suspected of committing crimes outside the United States. In 2006, the Drug Enforcement Administration decided to put together a sting to trap al-Kassar, code-named "Operation Legacy" and led by Jim Soiles and the DEA's Special Operations Division. They enlisted a 69-year-old Palestinian former member of the Black September Organization, referred to publicly only as "Samir", who was then being held in a U.S. prison. Samir spent much of 2006 trying to arrange a meeting with al-Kassar, and was finally able to in December 2006.

In February 2007, the DEA had Samir arrange a meeting between al-Kassar and two Guatemalan informants posing as FARC insurgents who wanted to purchase weapons to use against American military forces. The group met several more times, and at later meetings the informants were wearing hidden video cameras, which recorded al-Kassar agreeing to the terms of the deal.

The informants, at the request of the DEA, then tried to lure al-Kassar to Romania, ostensibly in order to collect his payment for the sale, where he could be easily arrested by U.S. agents; but al-Kassar refused. They instead convinced him to board a flight to Madrid for the same purpose. In June 2007, the Cuerpo Nacional de Policía (Spanish National Police) at the Barajas Airport in Madrid arrested him after he got off the plane. He was charged with conspiring to kill Americans, supplying terrorists, obtaining anti-aircraft missiles and money laundering.

On 13 June 2008, al-Kassar was extradited to the United States of America for trial; he arrived in New York in shackles the following day. On 20 November 2008, he was convicted in federal court of five charges, among them money laundering and conspiring to sell arms to suppliers for FARC. Sentencing for al-Kassar and co-defendant Luis Felipe Moreno Godoy was scheduled for 18 February 2009. The relatives of Leon Klinghoffer, the man murdered in the Achille Lauro incident, were in court for the verdict. Al-Kassar was represented by Ira Sorkin.

24 February 2009 al-Kassar was sentenced to 30 years in prison for conspiring to sell weapons to Colombian rebels.

A New Yorker article about the sting speculated that al-Kassar had been unusually lax in his behavior with the fake arms buyers, and that this may have been caused by financial desperation on al-Kassar's part, since, due to a decrease in world conflicts, the international arms trade was slower than it had been during the late 20th century.

== Imprisonment ==
Since 2009, al-Kassar has been serving his sentence at different federal prisons. He is currently held at United States Penitentiary, Florence High. He is due for release in 2032.

Since 2018, he has actively posted on Facebook, maintaining that he is innocent of the charges against him, and accusing the DEA and the Mossad of falsifying evidence used to convict him.

Monzer Al Kassar, pro se and incarcerated, appealed from the District Court’s denial of his 18 U.S.C. § 3582(c)(1)(A) motion for compassionate release. Al Kassar argued that he was at high risk of contracting severe illness from COVID-19 due to his chronic health conditions, which, he argued, was an extraordinary and compelling reason to release him. The District Court denied his initial motion, finding that the risk of contracting COVID-19 at the prison where Al Kassar is detained, USP Marion, was minimal at the time. Al Kassar renewed his motion three months later, arguing that conditions at the prison had deteriorated. The District Court denied the renewed motion, ruling that Al Kassar had established extraordinary and compelling reasons for compassionate release, but that 18 U.S.C. § 3553(a) factors weighed against releasing him.
