= Carlos Menem Jr. =

Argentine rally driver (1968–1995)

Carlos Saúl Facundo Menem Yoma (23 November 1968 – 15 March 1995), otherwise known as Carlos Menem Jr., was an Argentine rally driver. He was the son of former president of Argentina Carlos Menem and Zulema Yoma.

Menem was born in La Rioja Province, Argentina. He started his rally career in 1987. Menem competed in the World Rally Championship and PWRC. He died on March 15, 1995, while piloting a Bell 206B-3 helicopter with his friend and fellow racing driver, Silvio Oltra. The helicopter reportedly struck overhead power lines while taking off at San Nicolás, Argentina, and crashed, killing both men.

Although originally Menem's father agreed with the state's determination that the crash was an accident, later in life he accused Hezbollah of assassinating his son. The former president claimed he could not say anything at the time due to it being a state secret.
