= Yom (disambiguation) =

Yom rendered as day in English translations from the Hebrew (יום) and Arabic (يوم)

Yom may refer to:

== Hebrew holidays ==
- Yom Tov, in plural Yamim Tovim, literally the Good Day(s), the Jewish holidays
- Yom tov sheni shel galuyot The second festival day in the Diaspora
- Yom Kippur, Day of Atonement
- Yom Kippur Katan Minor Day of Atonement
- Yom Ha'atzmaut, establishment of the modern state of Israel
- Yom HaShoah, full name Yom HaZikaron laShoah ve-laG'vurah, Holocaust and Heroism Remembrance Day
- Yom Hazikaron Day of Remembrance for the Fallen Soldier
- Yom Yerushalayim Jerusalem Day

== Persons ==
- Yom Tov Asevilli (1250–1330), also known as Ritva, medieval rabbi and Halakhist famous for his commentary on the Talmud
- Yom-Tov Ehrlich (1914–1990), Hasidic musician, composer, lyricist of Yiddish music
- Yom-Tov Lipmann Heller (1579–1654), Bohemian rabbi and Talmudist
- Yom-Tov Lipmann-Muhlhausen, controversialist, talmudist, kabbalist and philosopher of the 14th and 15th centuries
- Yom Tov Tzahalon (c. 1559–1638), student of Moses ben Joseph di Trani and Moshe Alshich, publisher of a collection of responsa
- Yom Sang-seop (1897–1963), South Korean writer

== Others ==
- Ha-Yom, Hebrew-language newspaper published from 1886 to mid-1888 from Saint Petersburg, Russia
- Yom Kippur War, 1973 Arab–Israeli War
- Yom language or Pilapila, and formerly Kiliŋa or Kilir, a Gur language of Benin
- Yom River, the main tributary of the Nan River, Thailand
- Yom (TV series), a 2017 Indian animated television series
- Yom (clarinetist), French musician (French Wikipedia)
- Yom (artist), Japanese illustrator (Japanese Wikipedia)
