= Zulema Yoma =

First Lady of Argentina

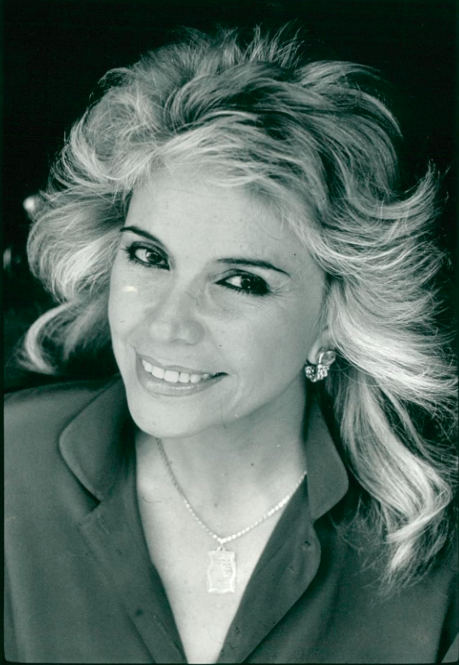
- Yoma in 1989

First Lady of Argentina
- In role 8 July 1989 – 26 April 1995; Suspended: 28 October 1991 – 26 April 1995
- President: Carlos Menem
- Preceded by: María Lorenza Barreneche
- Succeeded by: Zulema María Eva Menem

Personal details
- Born: Zulema Fátima Yoma; 18 December 1942 (age 83) Nonogasta, La Rioja Province, Argentina
- Spouse: Carlos Menem (m. 1966; div. 1995)
- Children: Zulema María Eva Menem; Carlos Saúl Facundo Menem (died 1995)

Zulema Fátima Yoma (born 18 December 1942) is an Argentine public figure who served as First Lady of Argentina during the presidency of her former husband, Carlos Saúl Menem. She is widely known for her claim that the 1995 helicopter crash that killed their son was a political assassination rather than an accident, as well as for her controversial refusal to acknowledge Antonella Pinetta as her granddaughter.

== Early life and marriage ==
She was born in Nonogasta, La Rioja Province, in December 1942 and met Menem in 1964 before they were married in 1966.

Yoma was married to Carlos Saúl Menem for 25 years, who served as President of Argentina from July 1989 to December 1999. Her parents were Syrian Muslims, as Menem's were. Yoma and Menem had two children, a son, Carlos Saúl Facundo Menem Yoma, who died in a helicopter crash in 1995, and a daughter, Zulemita, who, following her parents' divorce in 1991, fulfilled the role of First Lady at formal occasions for the remaining eight years of her father's presidency.

== Controversies ==
Her son, Carlos Saúl Facundo Menem, died in a helicopter crash in 1995. Although the crash was ruled an accident, there are conspiracy theories that say he was actually murdered, which Zulema Yoma and her daughter Zulemita believe. Yoma felt her son's death was politically motivated and even stated that the corpse buried in the tomb of the Islamic cemetery is not that of her son, requesting an exhumation.

Her son had an illegitimate daughter, Antonella Pinetta, born in 1988. Yoma did not recognize her as her granddaughter and refused to acknowledge the paternity test, requesting that the test be matched from the body of her son and to support her request for the exhumation of the body. Finally, the body was exhumed in November 2017 and was identified as her son's.
