= Carlos Menem =

President of Argentina from 1989 to 1999

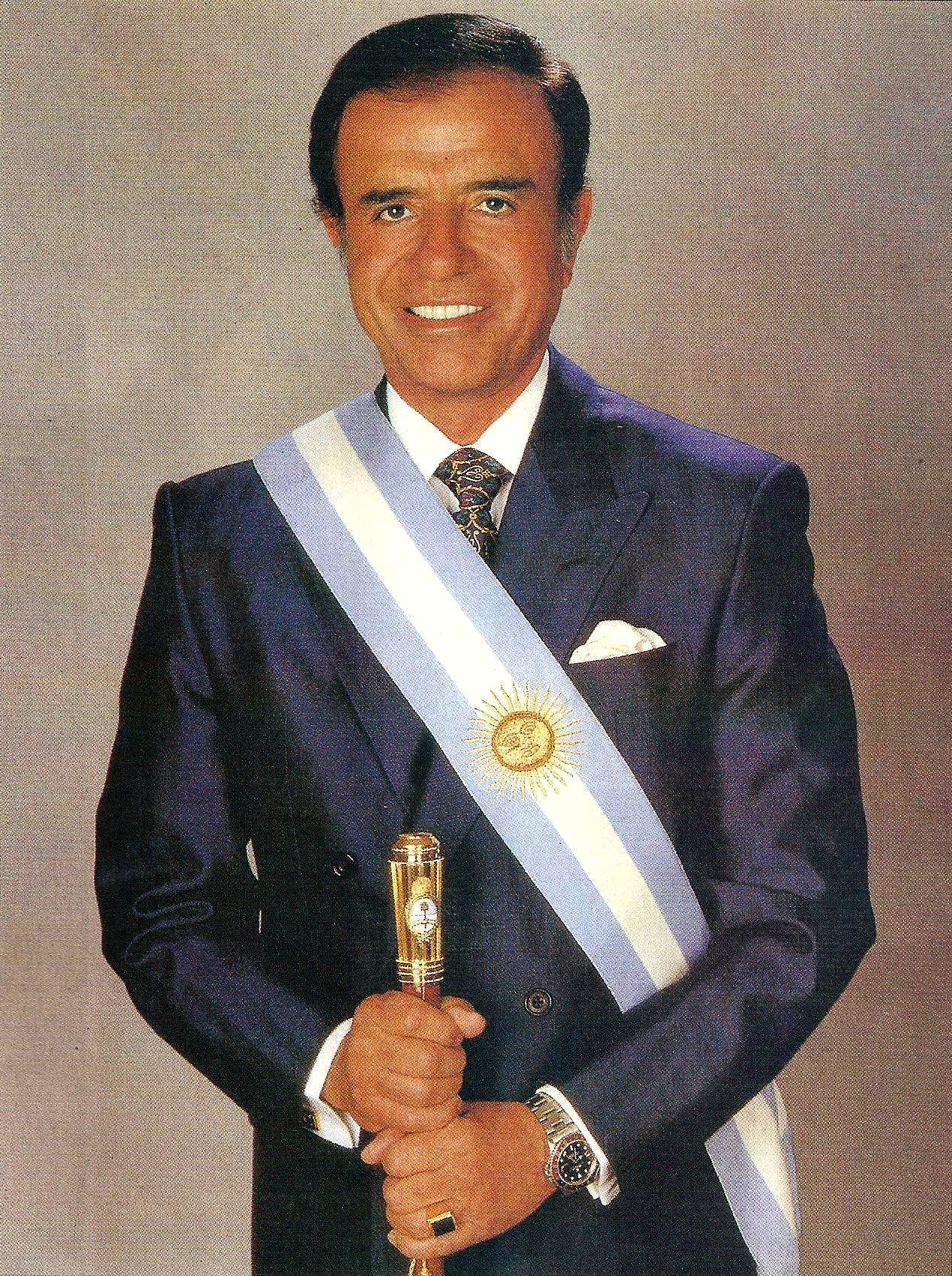
- Official portrait, 1995

50th President of Argentina
- In office 8 July 1989 – 10 December 1999
- Vice President: Eduardo Duhalde (1989–1991); None (1991–1995); Carlos Ruckauf (1995–1999)
- Preceded by: Raúl Alfonsín
- Succeeded by: Fernando de la Rúa

National Senator
- In office 10 December 2005 – 14 February 2021
- Preceded by: Eduardo Menem
- Constituency: La Rioja

President of the Justicialist Party
- In office 28 November 2001 – 11 June 2003
- Preceded by: Rubén Marín
- Succeeded by: Eduardo Fellner
- In office 10 August 1990 – 13 June 2001
- Preceded by: Antonio Cafiero
- Succeeded by: Rubén Marín

Governor of La Rioja
- In office 10 December 1983 – 8 July 1989
- Vice Governor: Alberto Gregorio Cavero
- Preceded by: Guillermo Jorge Piastrellini (de facto)
- Succeeded by: Alberto Gregorio Cavero
- In office 25 May 1973 – 24 March 1976
- Vice Governor: Libardo Sánchez
- Preceded by: Julio Raúl Luchesi (de facto)
- Succeeded by: Osvaldo Héctor Pérez Battaglia (de facto)

Personal details
- Born: Carlos Saúl Menem; 2 July 1930 Anillaco, La Rioja, Argentina
- Died: 14 February 2021 (aged 90) Buenos Aires, Argentina
- Resting place: San Justo Islamic Cemetery
- Party: Justicialist
- Other political affiliations: Front for Loyalty (2003); Justicialist Popular Unity Front (1989–1995)
- Spouses: Zulema Yoma (m. 1966; div. 1995) Cecilia Bolocco (m. 2001; div. 2011)
- Children: 4, including Carlos Jr. and Zulemita
- Relatives: Eduardo Menem (brother); Martín Menem (nephew)
- Education: National University of Córdoba
- Carlos Menem's voice Recorded c. 1989–1999

Carlos Saúl Menem (Spanish pronunciation: [ˈkaɾlos saˈul ˈmenen]; 2 July 1930 – 14 February 2021) was an Argentine politician who served as the president of Argentina for ten years, from 1989 to 1999. He identified as Peronist, serving as President of the Justicialist Party for 13 years (from 1990 to 2001 and again from 2001 to 2003), and his political approach became known as Menemism.

Born in Anillaco, La Rioja, to a Syrian family, Menem was raised as a Muslim, but later converted to Roman Catholicism to pursue a political career. (Note: Until 1994, the Argentine Constitution required that the President be a Catholic.) Menem became a Peronist during a visit to Buenos Aires. He was elected governor of La Rioja in 1973, deposed and detained following the 1976 Argentine coup d'état, and re-elected in 1983. He defeated the Buenos Aires governor Antonio Cafiero in the primary elections for the 1989 presidential elections. Hyperinflation and riots forced outgoing president Raúl Alfonsín to resign early, shortening the presidential transition.

Menem's presidency supported the Washington Consensus and tackled inflation with the Convertibility plan in 1991. The plan was complemented by a series of privatizations and was initially a success. Argentina re-established diplomatic relations with the United Kingdom, suspended since the 1982 Falklands War, and aligned itself with the United States. Under his administration, the country participated in the 1991 Gulf War and suffered two terrorist attacks: an attack on the Israeli embassy in 1992 and the 1994 AMIA bombing. The Peronist victory in the 1993 midterm elections allowed him to persuade Alfonsín, by then leader of the opposition party Radical Civic Union, to sign the Pact of Olivos for the 1994 amendment of the Argentine Constitution. This amendment allowed Menem to run for re-election in 1995, winning a second, four-year term. A new economic crisis began, and the opposing parties formed a political coalition, winning the 1997 midterm elections and the 1999 presidential election.

Menem was investigated on various criminal and corruption charges, including illegal arms trafficking (he was sentenced to seven years in prison), embezzlement of public funds (he was sentenced to 4 1/2 years to prison), extortion and bribery (he was declared innocent of both charges). His position as senator earned him immunity from incarceration.

Menem ran for the presidency again in 2003, but faced with a likely defeat in a ballotage against Néstor Kirchner, he chose to pull out, effectively handing the presidency to Kirchner. He was elected senator for La Rioja in 2005. By the time he died in 2021 at age 90, he was the oldest living former Argentine president. (Note: The rest of former living Presidents of Argentina at the time of his death were Isabel Perón, Adolfo Rodríguez Saá, Eduardo Duhalde, Cristina Fernández de Kirchner and Mauricio Macri, all younger than him. Alberto Fernández, president of Argentina at the time of his death, was also younger than him.) He is regarded as a polarizing figure in Argentina, mostly due to corruption and economic mismanagement throughout his presidency.

Carlos Menem is also remembered for his passion for sports. He was an avid supporter of the River Plate football club and enjoyed surrounding himself with prominent athletes such as Diego Maradona and Gabriela Sabatini.

== Early life and education ==
Carlos Saúl Menem (Arabic: كارلوس سول منعم) was born on 2 July 1930 in Anillaco, a small town in the mountainous north of La Rioja Province, Argentina. His parents, Saúl Menem (Arabic: شاول منعم) and Mohibe Akil (Arabic: مهيبة عقيل), were of Syrian Arab ancestry, from Yabroud, who had emigrated to Argentina. He attended elementary and high school in La Rioja, and joined a basketball team during his university studies. He visited Buenos Aires in 1951 with the team, and met the president Juan Perón and his wife Eva Perón. This influenced Menem to become a Peronist. He studied law at the National University of Córdoba, graduating in 1955.

After President Juan Perón's overthrow in 1955, Menem was briefly incarcerated. He later joined the successor to the Peronist Party, the Justicialist Party (Partido Justicialista) (PJ). He was elected president of its La Rioja Province chapter in 1973. In that capacity, he was included in the flight to Spain that brought Perón back to Argentina after his long exile. According to the Peronist politician Juan Manuel Abal Medina, Menem played no special part in the event.

== Governor of La Rioja ==
=== 1st term (1973–1976) and arrest ===
Menem was elected governor of La Rioja in 1973 when the proscription of Peronism was lifted. He was deposed during the 1976 Argentine coup d'état that overthrew President Isabel Perón. He was accused of corruption and having links with the guerrillas of the Dirty War. He was detained on 25 March, kept for a week at a local barracks, and then moved to a temporary prison on the ship 33 Orientales in Buenos Aires. He was detained alongside former ministers Antonio Cafiero, Jorge Alberto Taina, Miguel Unamuno, José Deheza, and Pedro Arrighi, the unionists Jorge Triaca, Diego Ibáñez, and Lorenzo Miguel, the diplomat Jorge Vázquez, the journalist Osvaldo Papaleo, and the former president Raúl Lastiri. He shared a cell with Pedro Eladio Vázquez, Juan Perón's personal physician. During this time he helped the chaplain Lorenzo Lavalle, despite still being a Muslim. In July he was sent to Magdalena, to a permanent prison. His wife Zulema visited him every week, but rejected his conversion to Roman Catholicism. His mother died during the time and dictator Jorge Rafael Videla denied his request to attend her funeral. He was released on 29 July 1978, on the condition that he live in a city outside his home province without leaving it. He settled in Mar del Plata. After meeting with Admiral Eduardo Massera, who intended to run for president, as well as Carlos Monzón, Susana Giménez, and Alberto Olmedo, he was ordered to move to Tandil and report daily to Chief of Police Hugo Zamora. The order was lifted in February 1980. He returned to Buenos Aires, and then to La Rioja. He resumed his political activities, despite the prohibition, and was detained again. His new forced residence was in Las Lomitas in the province of Formosa. He was one of the last politicians to be released from prison by the National Reorganization Process.

=== 2nd and 3rd terms (1983–1989) ===
Military rule ended in 1983, and the Radical Raúl Alfonsín was elected president. Menem ran for governor again and was elected by a clear margin. The province benefited from tax regulations established by the military, which allowed increased industrial growth. His party gained control of the provincial legislature, and he was re-elected in 1987 with 63% of the vote. The Partido Justicialista at the time was divided into two factions, the conservatives that still supported the political doctrines of Juan and Isabel Perón, and those who proposed a renovation of the party. The internal disputes ceased in 1987. Menem, with his prominent victory in his district, was one of the leading figures of the party and disputed its leadership.

== Presidential elections ==
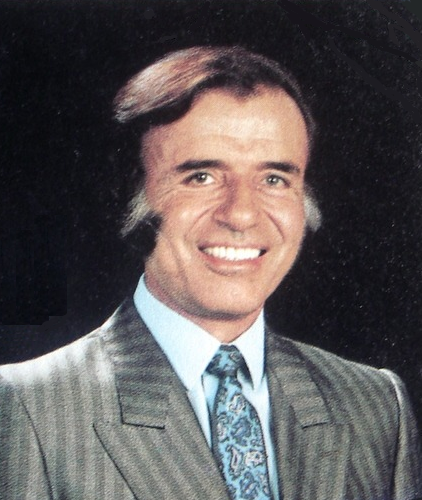
Menem's 1989 campaign photo.

Antonio Cafiero, who had been elected governor of Buenos Aires Province, led the renewal of the Partido Justicialista, and was considered their most likely candidate for the presidency. Menem, on the other hand, was seen as a populist leader. Using a big tent approach, he got support from several unrelated political figures. As a result, he defeated Cafiero in the primary elections. He sought alliances with Bunge and Born, union leaders, former members of Montoneros, and the AAA, people from the church, "Carapintadas", etc. He promised a "revolution of production" and huge wage increases, but it was not clear exactly which policies he was proposing. The rival candidate, Eduardo Angeloz, tried to point out the mistakes made by Menem and Alfonsín. Jacques de Mahieu, a French ideologue of the Peronist movement (and former Vichy collaborator), was photographed campaigning for Menem. His campaign slogans were ¡Siganme! (Follow me!) and ¡No los voy a defraudar! (I won't let you down!)

The elections were held on 14 May 1989. Menem won by a wide margin, and became the president-elect of Argentina. He was scheduled to take office on 10 December, but inflation levels took a turn for the worse, growing into hyperinflation, causing public riots. The outgoing president Alfonsín resigned and transferred power to Menem five months early, on 8 July. Menem's accession marked the first time since Hipólito Yrigoyen took office in 1916 that an incumbent president peacefully transferred power to an elected successor from the opposition.

== Presidency ==
"Carlos Menem's first presidency marked the end of a period fraught with uncertainties, during which successive de facto or constitutional national administrations had failed in trying to order the economy, curb monetary emission, and dismantle the powerful armed state apparatus in the 1940s during the presidency of Juan Perón and further enlarged by his successors. Menem drastically corrected, with accurate intuition and a firm pulse, the mistaken tendency to include among the functions of the State a number of business, industrial and commercial activities that had nothing to do with its essential mission. The results of its economic policy were reflected in an anticipated entry into the globalized world that was built after the fall of the Berlin Wall, in a rapid modernization of the country's productive infrastructure, and stability, which is the basis of long-term growth. Unfortunately, Menem's reformist drive collapsed when his second government began. His program of structural transformation of the country was interrupted and many strategic changes that were essential for the reforms of the previous period to produce the expected results were not executed."

— Editorial of the newspaper La Nación.

=== Economic policy ===
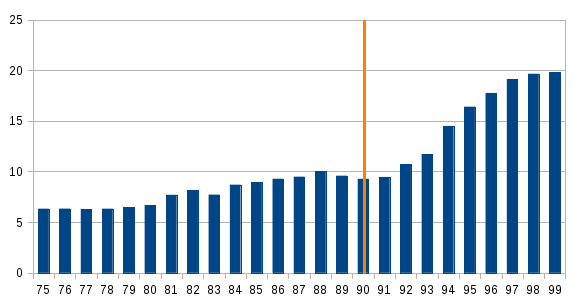
Fixed phone subscriptions per 100 people between 1975 and 1999. The orange line indicates the privatization of ENTel.

Hyperinflation forced Menem to abandon party orthodoxy in favour of a fiscally conservative, market-oriented economic policy. At the time, most economists thought that the ideal solution was the Washington Consensus; i.e. reduce expenditures below the amount of money earned by the state, and open international commerce to free trade. Alfonsín had proposed similar reforms in the past, alongside some limited privatization of state-owned enterprises; those projects were resisted by the Partido Justicialistal opposition party, whose internal factions were actually benefiting from the prevailing protectionist policies. The magnitude of the crisis, however, convinced most politicians to change their minds. Menem, fearing that the crisis might force him to resign as well, embraced the Washington Consensus and rejected the traditional policies of Peronism.

The president invited several conservative figures into his cabinet, such as Álvaro Alsogaray, as well as a businessman from Bunge and Born; Miguel Roig, the company's then-vice president, became Menem's first appointed minister of economy on 30 May, although he would be replaced just five days after taking office due to his sudden death by myocardial infarction; in his place was appointed Néstor Mario Rapanelli, who had succeeded Roig as vice president at Bunge and Born.

Congress passed the economic emergency and state reform laws. The first allowed president Menem to reduce or remove subsidies at his discretion, and the latter to privatize state enterprises – the first being telephones and airlines. These privatizations were beneficial to foreign creditors, who replaced their bonds with company shares. Despite increased tax revenue and the money gained from privatizations, the economy was still unstable. The Bunge and Born businessmen left the government in late 1989, amid a second round of hyperinflation.

The first measure of the new minister of economy, Antonio Erman González, was a mandatory conversion of time deposits into government bonds: the BONEX plan. It exacerbated the recession but was successful in reducing the inflation rate, which was its intended purpose. His fourth minister of economy, Domingo Cavallo, was appointed in 1991 and deepened the liberalization of the economy. The Convertibility plan was sanctioned by Congress, setting a one-to-one fixed exchange rate between the United States dollar and the new peso, which replaced the austral. The law also limited public expenditures, but this was frequently ignored. Under Cavallo, there was increased free trade, alongside a general reduction of tariffs on imports and state regulations to tackle inflation, and high taxes on sales and earnings to reduce the deficit caused by it. Initially, the plan was a success: the capital flight ended, interest rates were lowered, inflation fell to single digits, and economic activity increased; in that year alone, the gross domestic product grew at a rate of 10.5%.

The money from privatizations allowed Argentina to repurchase many of the Brady Bonds issued during the crisis. The privatizations of electricity, water, and gas services were more successful than previous ones. YPF, the national oil refinery, was partially privatized as well, with the state keeping a good portion of its shares. The project to privatize the pension funds was resisted in Congress and was approved as a mixed system that allowed both public and private options for workers. The national state also signed a fiscal pact with the provinces, so that they reduced their local deficits as well; Buenos Aires Province was aided with a fund that gave the governor a million pesos daily.

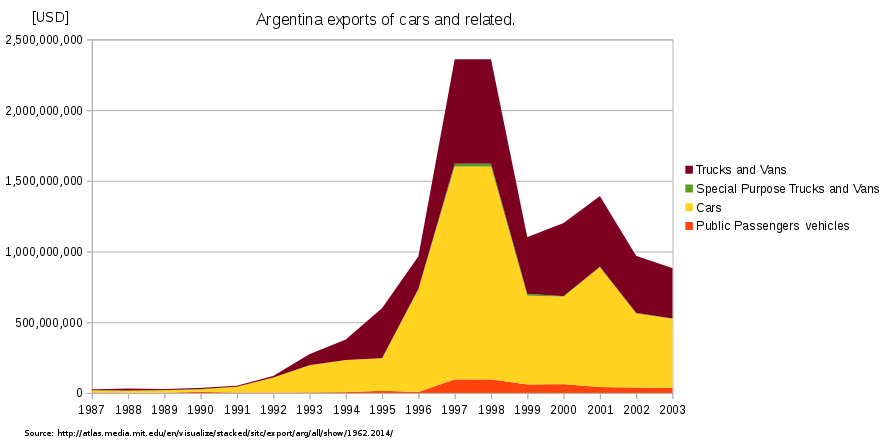
Car and related exports (1983–2003) in millions of USD. During the 1990s, Argentina experienced growth in vehicle export revenue.

Although the Convertibility plan had positive consequences in the short term, it caused problems that surfaced later. Large numbers of employees of privatized state enterprises were fired, and unemployment grew to over 10%. Big compensation payments prevented an immediate public reaction. Free trade and the expensive costs in dollars forced private companies to reduce the number of workers as well, or risk bankruptcy. Unions were unable to resist the changes. People with low incomes, such as retirees and state workers, suffered under tax increases while their wages remained frozen. Some provinces, such as Santiago del Estero, Jujuy, and San Juan, endured violent riots as well. To compensate for these issues, the government started a number of social welfare programs and restored protectionist policies over some sectors of the economy. It was difficult for Argentine companies to export, and easy imports damaged most national producers. The national budget soon slid into a deficit.

Cavallo soon began the second wave of privatizations, this time targeting the national postal service, the Correo Argentino, and the country's nuclear power plants. He also limited the amount of money released to the provinces. He still had the full support of Menem, despite growing opposition within the Justicialist Party.

The Mexican Tequila Crisis of 1994 impacted the national economy, causing the deficit, recession, and a growth in unemployment. The government further reduced public expenditures, the wages of state workers, and raised taxes. The deficit and recession were reduced, but unemployment stayed high. External debt increased. The crisis also proved that the economic system was vulnerable to capital flight.

The growing discontent over unemployment and the scandals caused by the privatization of the postal service led to Cavallo's removal as a minister, and his replacement by Roque Fernández. Fernández maintained Cavallo's fiscal austerity; he increased the price of fuels, sold the remaining state shares of YPF to Repsol, fired state employees, and raised the value-added tax to 21%. New labor law was met with resistance, both by Peronists, opposition parties, and unions, and could not be approved by Congress.

The 1997 Asian financial crisis and the 1998 Russian financial crisis also affected the country with consequences that lasted longer than the Tequila Crisis and started a depression.

=== Domestic policy ===
President Menem in a 1992 address outlining his plans for the reform of the nation's educational system, as well as for the privatization of the YPF oil concern, and of the pension system

Menem began his presidency assuming a non-confrontational approach, appointing people from the conservative opposition and business people to his cabinet. To prevent successful legal cases against pro-market economic reforms, the Supreme Court's numbers were increased from five to nine judges; the new judges ruled in support of Menem and usually had the majority. Other institutions that restrained or limited executive power were controlled as well. When Congress resisted some of his proposals, he used the Necessity and Urgency Decree as an alternative to sending bills to it. He even considered it feasible to dissolve Congress and rule by decree, but this step was never implemented. In addition, he developed a bon vivant lifestyle, taking advantage of his authority. For instance, he made a journey from Buenos Aires to Pinamar driving a Ferrari 348 TB (often misreported as a Ferrari Testarossa) in less than two hours, violating speed limits. He divorced his wife Zulema Yoma and expanded the Quinta de Olivos presidential residence with a golf course, a small zoo, servants, a barber, and even a buffoon.

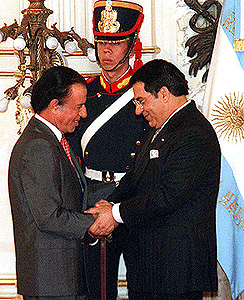
Carlos Menem and Zine El Abidine Ben Ali (1997)

The swiftgate scandal broke out in December 1990, as American investors were damaged by a case of corruption, and asked for assistance from the United States' Ambassador Terence Todman. Most of the ministers resigned as a result of it. Cavallo was reassigned as minister of economy, and his successful economic plan turned him into a prominent figure in Menem's cabinet. Cavallo brought a number of independent economists to the cabinet, and Menem supported him by replacing Peronist politicians. Both teams complemented each other. Both Menem and Cavallo tried to be recognized as the designer of the convertibility plan.

Antonio Cafiero, a rival of Menem in the Partido Justicialista, was unable to amend the constitution of the province of Buenos Aires to run for re-election. Duhalde stepped down from the vice presidency and became the new governor in the 1991 elections, turning the province into a powerful bastion. Menem also selected famous people with no political background to run for office in those elections, including the singer Palito Ortega and racing driver Carlos Reutemann. The elections were a big success for the Partido Justicialistal. After these elections, all of the Partido Justicialistal, was aligned with Menem's leadership, with the exception of a small number of legislators known as the "Group of Eight". The opposition from the UCR was minimal, as the party was still discredited by the 1989 crisis. With such political influence, Menem began his proposal to amend the constitution to allow a re-election. The party did not have the required supermajority in the Congress to call for it. The Partido Justicialistal was divided, as other politicians intended to replace Menem in 1995 or negotiate their support. The UCR was divided as well, as Alfonsín opposed the proposal, but governors Angeloz and Massaccesi were open for negotiations. The victory in the 1993 elections strengthened his proposal, which was approved by the Senate. Menem called for a non-binding referendum on the proposal, to increase pressure on the Radical deputies. He also sent a bill to Congress to modify the majority requirements. Alfonsín met with Menem and agreed to support the proposal in exchange for amendments that would place limits on presidential power. This negotiation is known as the Pact of Olivos. The capital city of Buenos Aires would be allowed to elect its own chief of government. Presidential elections would use a system of ballotage, and the president could only be re-elected once. The electoral college was abolished, replaced by direct elections. The provinces would be allowed to elect a third senator; two for the majority party and one for the first minority. The Council of Magistracy of the Nation would have the power to propose new judges, and the Necessity and Urgency Decrees would have a reduced scope.

Despite the internal opposition of Fernando de la Rúa, Alfonsín got his party to approve the pact. He reasoned that Menem would be supported by the eventual referendum, that many legislators would turn to his side, and he would eventually be able to amend the constitution reinforcing presidential power rather than limiting it. Still, as both sides feared a betrayal, all the contents of the pact were included as a single proposal, not allowing the Constituent Assembly to discuss each one separately. The Broad Front, a new political party composed of former Peronists, led by Carlos Álvarez, grew in the elections for the Constituent Assembly. Both the Partido Justicialista and the UCR respected the pact, which was completely approved. Duhalde made a similar amendment to the constitution of Buenos Aires province, in order to be re-elected in 1995. Menem won the elections with more than 50% of the vote, followed by José Octavio Bordón and Carlos Álvarez. The UCR finished third in the elections for the first time.

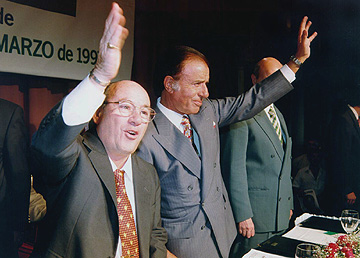
Menem, in the 1999 campaign

Growing unemployment increased popular resistance against Menem after his re-election. There were several riots and demonstrations in the provinces, unions opposed the economic policies, and the opposing parties organized the first cacerolazos. Estanislao Esteban Karlic replaced Antonio Quarracino as the head of the Argentine Episcopal Conference, which led to a growing opposition to Menem from the Church. The teachers' unions established a "white tent" at the Congressional plaza as a form of protest. The first piqueteros operated in Cutral Có, and this protest method was soon imitated in the rest of the country. Menem's authority in the Partido Justicialista was also held in doubt, as he was unable to run for another re-election and the party sought a candidate for the 1999 elections. This led to a fierce rivalry with Duhalde, the most likely candidate. Menem attempted to undermine his chances, and proposed a new amendment to the constitution allowing him to run for an unlimited number of re-elections. He also started a judicial case, claiming that his inability to run for a third term was a proscription. Several scandals erupted, such as the scandal over Argentine arms sales to Ecuador and Croatia, the Río Tercero explosion that may have destroyed evidence, the murder of the journalist José Luis Cabezas, and the suicide of Alfredo Yabrán, who may have ordered it. The Partido Justicialista lost the 1997 midterm elections against the UCR and the FREPASO united in a political coalition, the Alliance for Work, Justice and Education (Alianza). The Supreme Court confirmed that Menem was unable to run for a third re-election. Duhalde became the candidate for the presidential elections, and lost to the candidate for the Alianza ticket, Fernando de la Rúa.

=== Foreign policy ===
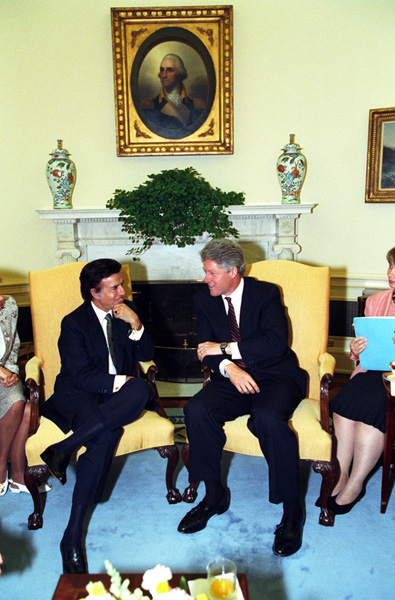
Menem with Bill Clinton in June 1993

During Menem's presidency, Argentina aligned with the United States, and had special relations with the country. Menem had good relations with U.S. president George H. W. Bush, and his successor Bill Clinton from 1993 on.

The country left the Non-Aligned Movement, and the Cóndor missile program was discontinued. Argentina supported all the international positions of the U.S., and sent forces to the Gulf War, and the peace keeping efforts during the War in Bosnia and after the Kosovo War.

The country was accepted as a major non-NATO ally, but not as a full member.

Menem's government re-established relations with the United Kingdom, suspended since the Falklands War, after Margaret Thatcher left office in 1990. The discussions on the Falkland Islands sovereignty dispute were temporarily given a lower priority, and the focus shifted to discussions of fishing rights.

In 1991, Menem became the first head of state of Argentina to make a diplomatic visit to Israel. He proposed mediating between Israel and Syria in their negotiations over the Golan Heights. The diplomatic relations between Argentina and Israel were later damaged by the lack of results in the investigations over the terrorist attacks against the Israeli embassy and the AMIA center in Buenos Aires.

In 1998, Menem visited Russia, and met with Russian president Boris Yeltsin, where Menem expressed his anticommunist sentiments and congratulated Yeltsin for "defeating communism" in Russia.

==== Chile ====
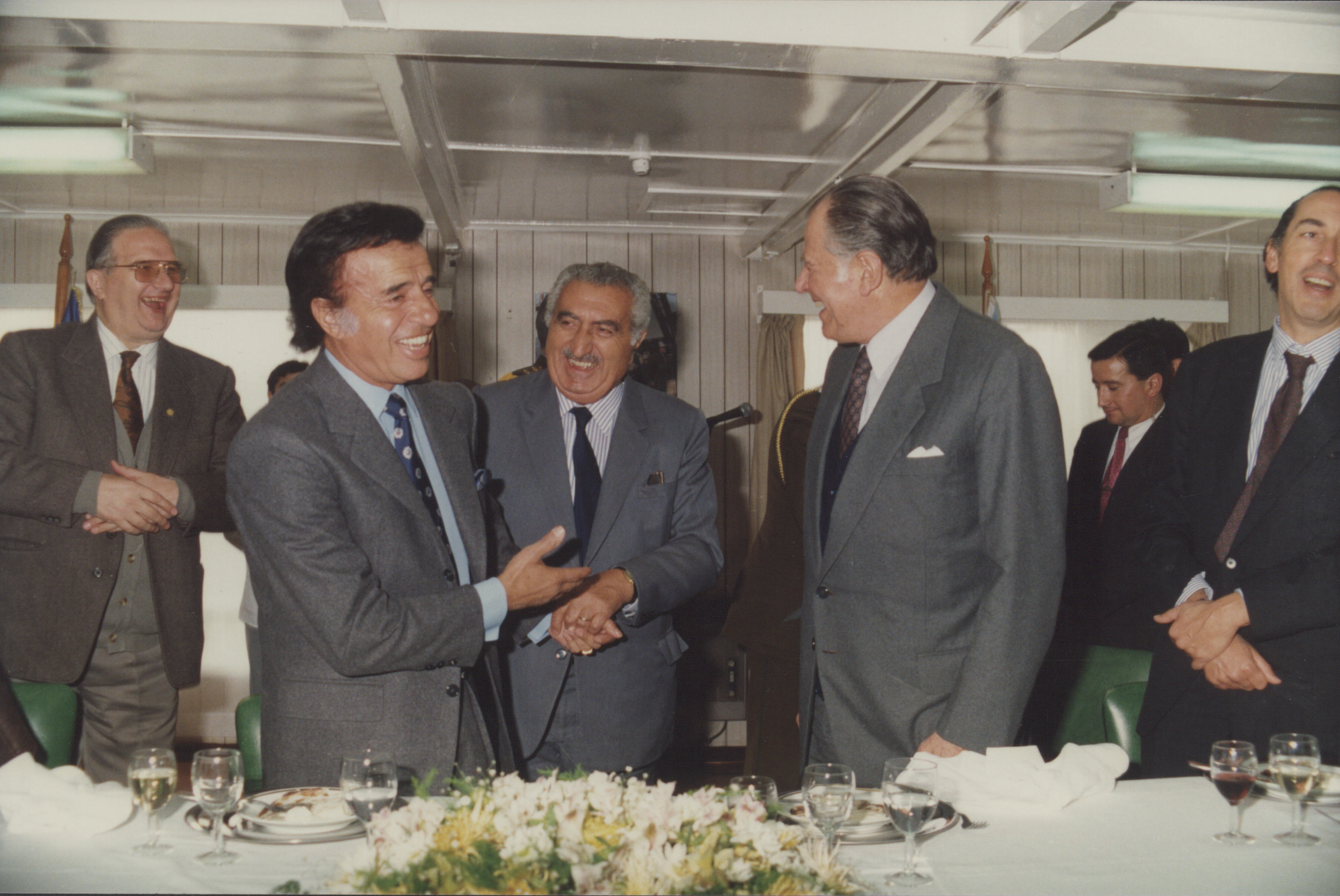
Menem and Patricio Aylwin in April 1993

Menem also settled all remaining border issues with Chile. The Lago del Desierto dispute had an international arbitration, favourable to Argentina. The only exception was the dispute over the Southern Patagonian Ice Field, which is still open.

Previously and contrary to other Peronist authorities, Menem voted for the Treaty of Peace and Friendship of 1984 between Chile and Argentina. Chilean president Patricio Aylwin was at first sceptical towards his Argentine counterpart whom he according to Emol considered "scruffy" (Spanish: destartalado). Over time however Aylwin changed his opinion, saying at one point "this Turk wins everybody over" (este turco se los conquista a todos). Aylwin's successor, Eduardo Frei Ruiz-Tagle, had particularly warm relations with Menem. Former Chilean foreign minister José Miguel Insulza recalls of meetings with Menem and Eduardo Frei Ruiz-Tagle in Anillaco in the 1990s where they enjoyed talking about politics and football. All of this made the critics of Menem label him "pro-Chilean". President of Chile Sebastián Piñera posthumously called him "a good friend of Chile". Similarly, José Miguel Insulza called Menem "one of the best friends of Chile".

=== Armed forces ===
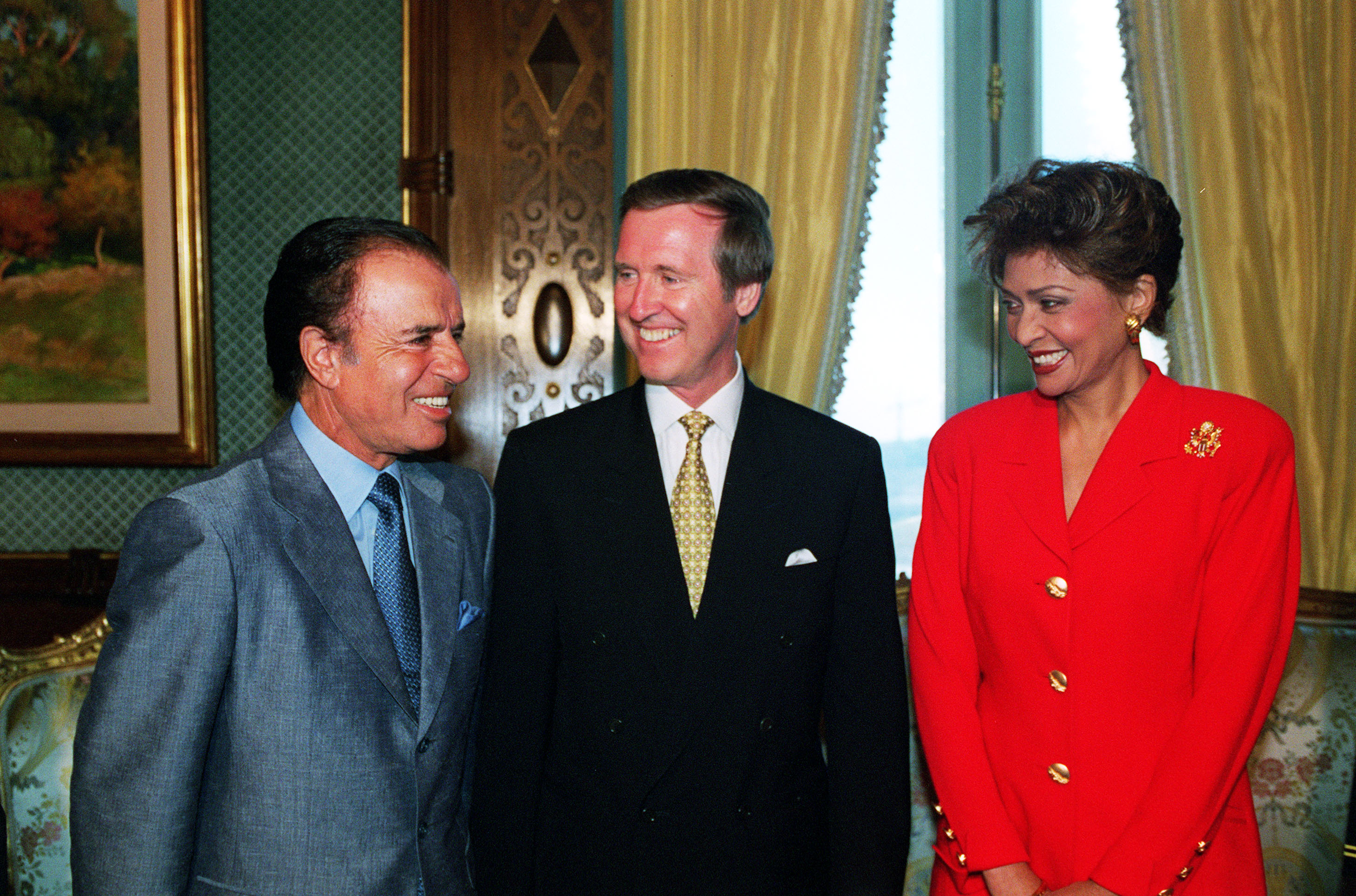
Menem meeting with U.S Secretary of Defense William Cohen at the Casa Rosada on 15 November 1999

Argentina was still divided by the aftermath of the Dirty War (the dirty war ended in 1983, Menem's presidency began in 1989). Menem proposed an agenda of national reconciliation. First, he arranged the repatriation of the body of Juan Manuel de Rosas, a controversial 19th century governor, and proposed to reconcile his legacy with those of Bartolomé Mitre and Domingo Faustino Sarmiento, who also fought in the Argentine Civil Wars. Menem intended to use the reconciliation of these historical Argentine figures as a metaphor for the reconciliation of the Dirty War. However, although the repatriation and acceptance of Rosas was a success, the acceptance of the military regime was not.

The military leaders of the National Reorganization Process, convicted in the 1985 Trial of the Juntas, received presidential pardons, despite popular opposition to them. This was an old request of the Carapintadas in previous years. However, Menem did not apply their proposed changes to the military. The colonel, Mohamed Alí Seineldín, who was also pardoned, started a new mutiny, killing two military men. Unlike the mutinies that took place during the presidency of Alfonsín, the military fully obeyed Menem's orders for a forceful repression. Seineldín was utterly defeated, and sentenced to life imprisonment. This was the last military mutiny in Argentina.

The president effected drastic cuts to the military budget, and privatized military factories. Menem appointed Lt. Gen. Martín Balza, who had performed well during the repression of Seineldín's mutiny, as the Army's General Chief of Staff (head of the military hierarchy). Menem abolished conscription in the country in August 1994 following the murder of Omar Carrasco, a conscript tortured and beaten to death by superiors in Neuquén. The following year, Balza voiced the first institutional self-criticism of the armed forces during the Dirty War, saying that obedience did not justify the actions committed in those years.

=== Terrorist attacks ===
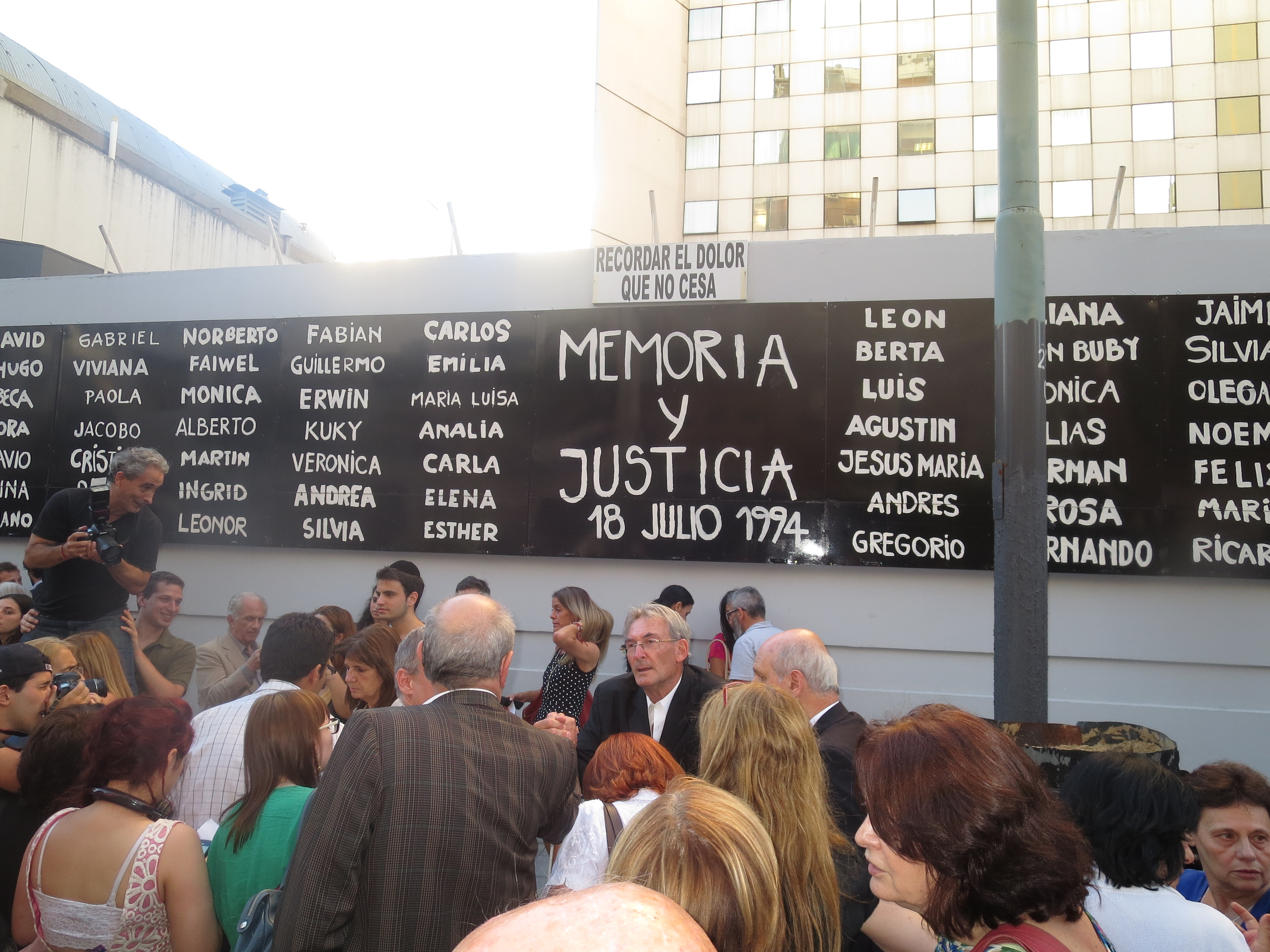
Demonstration during an anniversary of the AMIA bombing

The Israeli embassy suffered a terrorist car bomb attack on 17 March 1992. It was perceived as a consequence of Argentina's involvement in the Gulf War. Although Hezbollah claimed responsibility for it, the Supreme Court investigated several other hypotheses. The Court wrote a report in 1996 suggesting that it could have been the explosion of an arms cache stored in the basement. Another hypothesis was that the attack could have been performed by Jewish extremists, in order to cast blame on Muslims and thwart the peace negotiations. The Court finally held Hezbollah responsible for the attack in May 1999.

The Argentine Israelite Mutual Association suffered a terrorist attack with another car bomb on 18 July 1994, killing eighty-five people. It was the most destructive terrorist attack in the history of Latin America. The attack was universally condemned and 155,000 people demonstrated at the Congressional plaza, but Menem did not attend. The legal case stayed unresolved during the remainder of Menem's presidency. Menem had suggested, in the first press conference, that former Carapintada leaders may be responsible for the attack, but this idea was rejected by the minister of defense several hours later. The CIA office in Buenos Aires initially considered it a joint Iranian-Syrian attack, but some days later considered it just an Iranian attack. Menem and Mossad also preferred this line of investigation. As a result of the attack, the Jewish community in Argentina had increased influence over Argentine politics. Years later, the prosecutor Alberto Nisman charged Menem with covering up a local connection to the attack, as the local terrorists may have been distant Syrian relatives of the Menem family. However, Menem was never tried for this suspected cover-up, and on 18 January 2015, Nisman was found dead of a gunshot to his head at his home in Buenos Aires.

On 15 March 1995, Menem's son Carlos Menem Jr. died while piloting a Bell 206B-3 helicopter, along with his friend and fellow racing driver Silvio Oltra who was riding as a passenger. The helicopter reportedly struck overhead power lines near Ramallo in the north of the province of Buenos Aires and crashed, killing both men. Later on, the remains of Menem Jr. were exhumed amid murder claims by his mother Zulema Yoma. Menem had accused the Lebanese Shia Islamist group, Hezbollah, of killing his son.

== Post-presidency ==
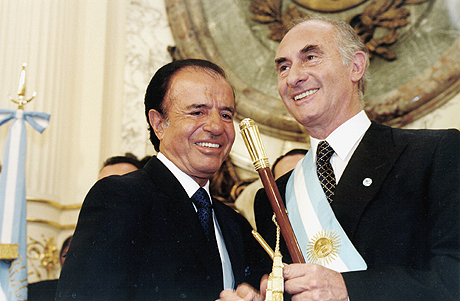
Menem with the new president, Fernando de la Rúa, on 10 December 1999

Menem ran in 2003 and won the greatest number of votes, 24%, in the first round of the 27 April 2003 presidential election; but votes were split among numerous parties. Under the 1994 amendment, a presidential candidate can win outright by winning 45% of the vote, or 40% if the margin of victory is 10 or more percentage points. This set the stage for Argentina's first-ever ballotage between Menem and second-place finisher, and fellow Peronist, Néstor Kirchner, who had received 22%. It was scheduled for 18 May. However, by that time, Menem had become very unpopular. Polls predicted that he faced almost certain defeat by Kirchner in the runoff. Most polls showed Kirchner taking at least 60 percent of the vote, and at least one poll showed Menem losing by as many as 50 points. To avoid a humiliating defeat, Menem withdrew his candidacy on 14 May, effectively handing the presidency to Kirchner.

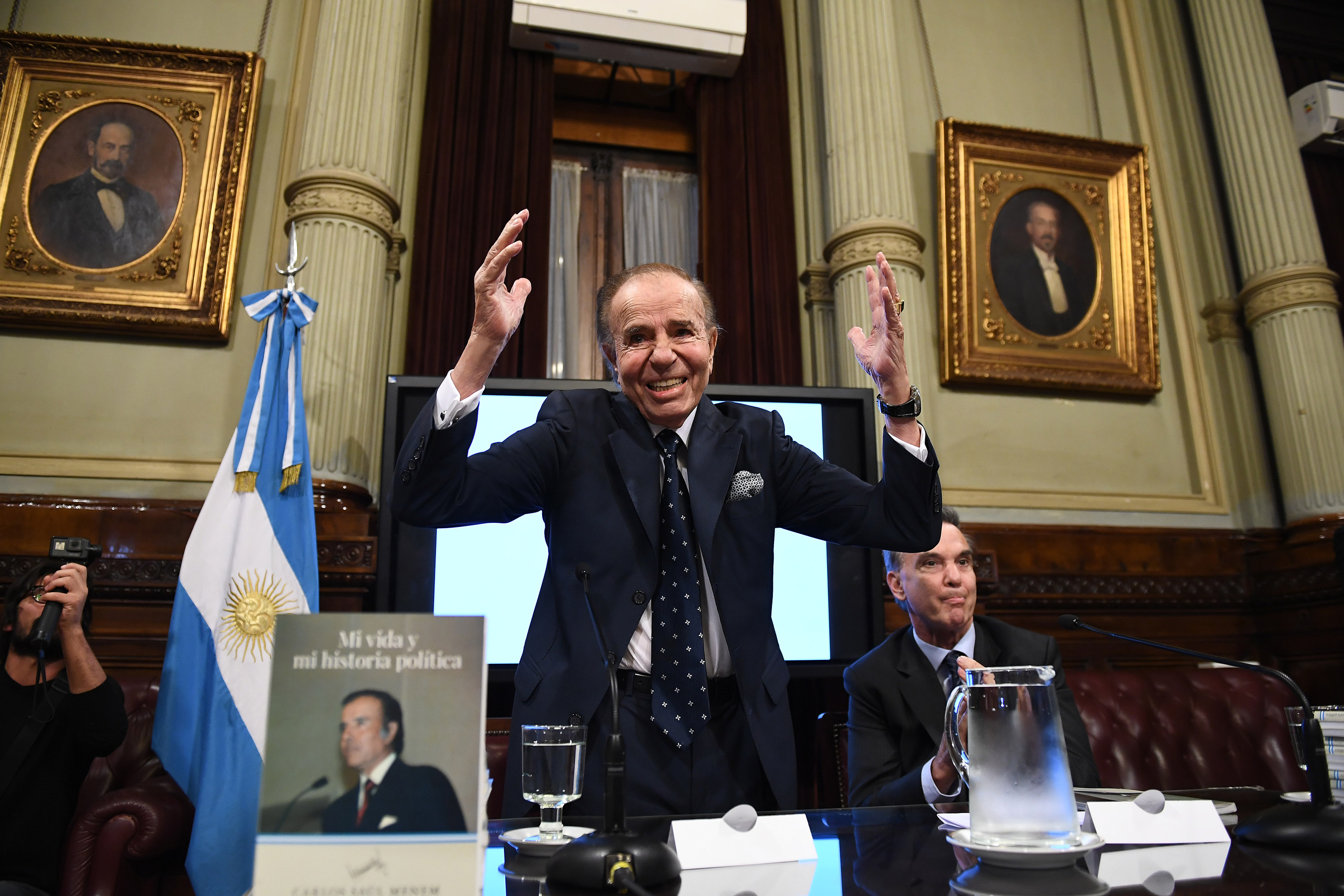
Carlos Menem in the Argentine Senate in a debate on a bill in 2018.

Ángel Maza, the elected governor of La Rioja, was allied with Menem, and had campaigned for him. However, weak provincial finances forced Maza to switch his support to Kirchner, which weakened Menem's influence even further. In June 2004 Menem announced that he had founded a new faction within the Partido Justicialista, called "People's Peronism". He announced his intention to run in the 2007 election. In 2005, the press reported that he was trying to form an alliance with his former minister of economy Cavallo to fight in the parliamentary elections. Menem said that there had been only preliminary conversations and an alliance did not result. In the 23 October 2005 elections, Menem won the minority seat in the Senate representing his province of birth. The two seats allocated to the majority were won by President Kirchner's faction, locally led by Ángel Maza.

Menem ran for Governor of La Rioja in August 2007, but was defeated. He finished in third place with about 22% of the vote. This was viewed as a catastrophic defeat, signaling the end of his political dominance in La Rioja. It was the first time in 30 years that Menem had lost an election. Following this defeat in his home province, he withdrew his candidacy for president. At the end of 2009 he announced that he intended to run for the presidency again in the 2011 elections. but ran for a new term as a senator instead. In 2019, he eventually sat in the Frente de Todos' Senate bench until his death in 2021.

=== Corruption charges ===
On 7 June 2001, Menem was arrested over a weapons export scandal. The scheme was based on exports to Ecuador and Croatia in 1991 and 1996. He was held under house arrest until November. He appeared before a judge in late August 2002 and denied all charges. Menem and his Chilean second wife Cecilia Bolocco, who had had a child since their marriage in 2001, fled to Chile. Argentine judicial authorities repeatedly requested Menem's extradition to face embezzlement charges. This request was rejected by the Chilean Supreme Court as under Chilean law, people cannot be extradited for questioning. On 22 December 2004, after the arrest warrants were cancelled, Menem returned with his family to Argentina. He still faced charges of embezzlement and failing to declare illegal funds in a Swiss bank. He was declared innocent of those charges in 2013.

In August 2008, Menem was placed under investigation for his role in the 1995 Río Tercero explosion, which is alleged to have been part of the weapons scandal involving Croatia and Ecuador. Following an Appeals Court ruling that found Menem guilty of aggravated smuggling, he was sentenced to seven years in prison on 13 June 2013, for his role in illegally smuggling weapons to Ecuador and Croatia; his position as senator earned him immunity from incarceration, and his advanced age (82) afforded him the possibility of house arrest. His minister of defence during the weapons sales, Oscar Camilión, was concurrently sentenced to 5 1/2 years. Menem was scheduled to attend a trial on the matter in which he was charged with "indirect responsibility", on 24 February 2021; but died ten days before that.

In December 2008, the German multinational Siemens agreed to pay an $800 million fine to the United States government, and approximately €700 million to the German government, to settle allegations of bribery. The settlement revealed that Menem had received about US$2 million in bribes from Siemens in exchange for awarding the national ID card and passport production contract to Siemens; Menem denied the charges but nonetheless agreed to pay a fine.

On 1 December 2015, Menem was also found guilty of embezzlement, and sentenced to 4 1/2 years to prison. Domingo Cavallo, his economy minister, and Raúl Granillo Ocampo, Menem's former minister of justice, also received prison sentences of more than three years for participating in the scheme, and were ordered to repay hundreds of thousands of pesos' worth of illegal bonuses.

== Illness and death ==
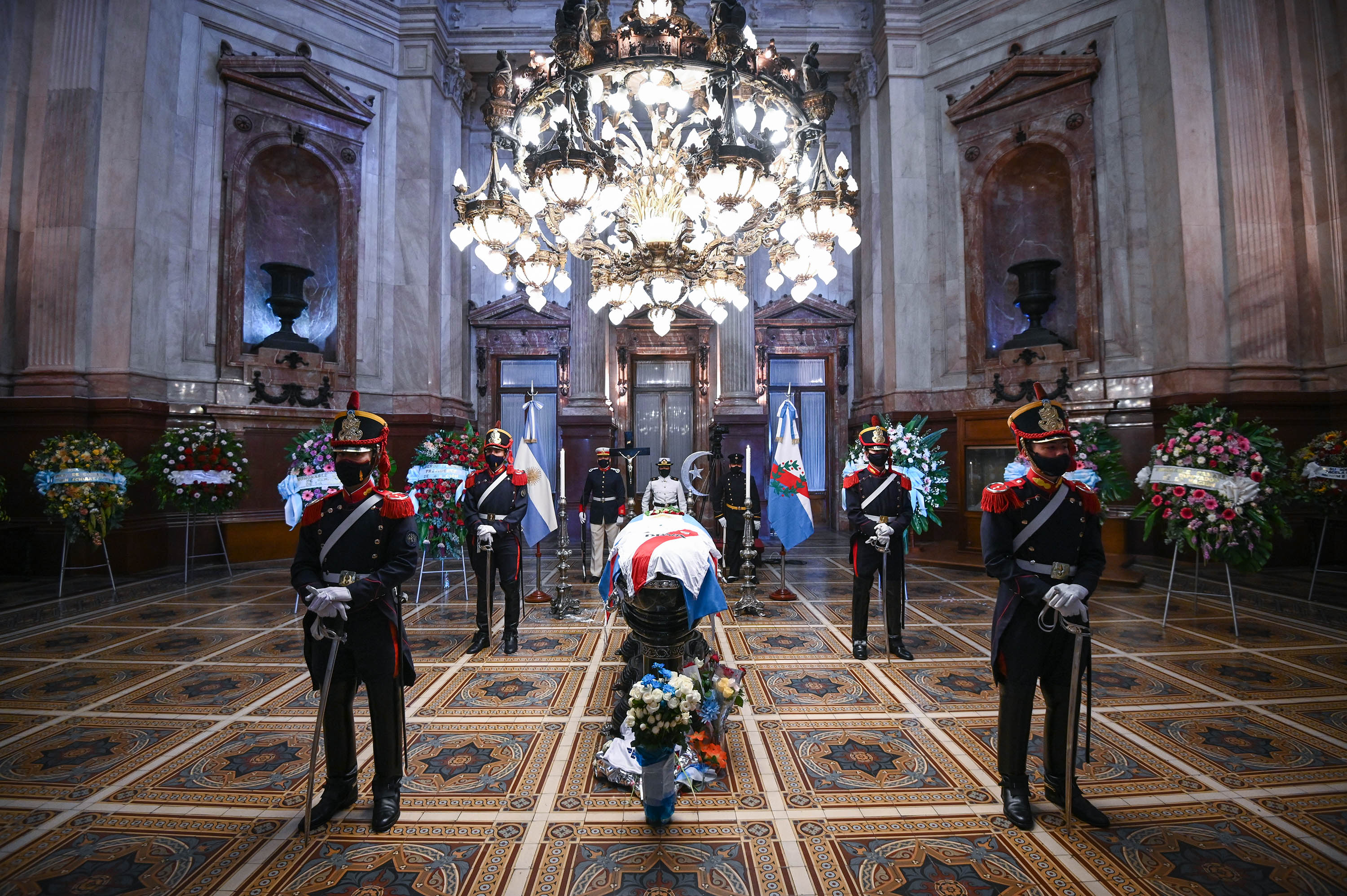
Menem lying in state

On 13 June 2020, Menem was hospitalized due to a severe case of pneumonia and placed in intensive care; he tested negative for COVID-19 and was discharged on 29 June 2020, three days before his 90th birthday. On 15 December 2020, he was hospitalized again at the Los Arcos Sanatorium due to a urinary infection. On 24 December 2020, Menem was induced into coma after a kidney failure.

He died on 14 February 2021 at the Sanatorio Los Arcos in Buenos Aires from complications of urinary tract infection. The national government issued three days of national mourning, and had a public funeral at the Palace of the Argentine National Congress. It was attended by several politicians, including the president Alberto Fernández, and by hundreds of people. He was buried at the San Justo Islamic cemetery the following day, next to his son. His daughter, Zulemita, confirmed that he had died as a Catholic, but he would be buried according to Muslim rites in the Islamic Cemetery to be with his family.

Although former presidents are meant to have a bust at the Hall of Busts of the Casa Rosada eight years after they leave office, by the time of his death Menem never received that honor. Casa Rosada had a bust of Menem donated by artist Fernando Pugliese, but had not yet disclosed this to the public. President Alberto Fernández told Zulemita Menem that the intention was to reveal the bust in a ceremony once Menem recovered from his illness but Menem's death disrupted the plans.

== Style and legacy ==
In the early days, Menem sported an image similar to the old caudillos, such as Facundo Quiroga and Chacho Peñaloza. He groomed his sideburns in a similar style. His presidential inauguration was attended by several gauchos.

Contrary to Peronist tradition, Menem did not prepare huge rallies in the Plaza de Mayo to address the people from the balcony of the Casa Rosada. Instead, he took full advantage of mass media, such as television.

Menem's administration was exalted by libertarians Javier Milei and Diego Giacomini in the late 2010s, after being strongly criticized during and by Kirchnerism. Some liberal economists such as José Luis Espert and Alberto Benegas Lynch have also taken a critical approach towards Menem's presidency.

President Javier Milei inaugurated the bust of Carlos Menem at the Casa Rosada in May 2024, 35 years after his victory in the 1989 elections. The event was attended by the Menem family (except for his former wife Zulema Yoma), former officers of the Menem administration, and Milei's own cabinet. The bust is modeled after Menem's 1980s appearance, with high sideburns. Milei praised that, unlike most Argentine politicians Menem had worked in the private sector before getting started in politics, and that he pardoned the military and guerrillas alike even if facing rejection from his own family. The bust is made of carrara marble and, unlike most other busts in the hall, it shows Menem with a prominent smile.

His lasting legacy was a record so notorious as to shut off rational discussion about economic policy in Latin America for a generation. He and his Argentina were indelibly branded as "neoliberal" slaves to the "Washington consensus". By extension, liberalism and a capitalist economy were damned.

— The Economist, February 20, 2021

In July 2025, the former president was featured in the drama miniseries Menem, premiering on July 9, 2025 and distributed internationally by Amazon Prime Video. Within hours of its premiere, Menem ranked in the Top 10 on Amazon Prime Video regionally, setting an important precedent for Latin productions.

== Honours ==
=== Foreign honours ===
- Croatia:
  - Grand Cross of the Grand Order of King Tomislav
- Egypt:
  - Collar of the Order of the Nile
- Jamaica:
  - First Class of the Order of Jamaica
- Lithuania:
  - Grand Cross of the Order of Vytautas the Great
- Italy:
  - Knight Grand Cross with Collar Order of Merit of the Italian Republic (1992)
- Malaysia:
  - Honorary Recipient of the Order of the Crown of the Realm (1991)
- Panama:
  - Collar of the Order of Manuel Amador Guerrero
- Peru:
  - Collar of the Order of the Sun of Peru
- Poland:
  - Grand Cross of the Order of Merit of the Republic of Poland
- Spain:
  - Collar of the Order of Isabella the Catholic
- South Africa:
  - Grand Cross of the Order of Good Hope
- Hungary:
  - Grand Cross with Chain of the Order of Merit of the Republic of Hungary (1997)
- Tunisia:
  - Grand Cordon of the Order of the Republic of Tunisia (1997)
- Uruguay:
  - Medal of the Oriental Republic of Uruguay (1994)
- United Kingdom:
  - Honorary Knight Grand Cross of the Order of St Michael and St George (1998)

== Bibliography ==
- Edwards, Todd (2008). Argentina: A global studies handbook. United States: ABC-Clio. ISBN 978-1-85109-987-0.
- Giraudy, Agustina (2015). Democrats and Autocrats: Pathways of Subnational Undemocratic Regime continuity within democratic countries. United Kingdom: Oxford University Press. ISBN 978-0-19-870686-1.
- Johnson, Lyman (2004). Death, dismemberment, and memory: body politics in Latin America. United States: University of New Mexico Press. ISBN 0-8263-3200-5.
- Levine, Anete (2015). Landscapes of Memory and Impunity: The Aftermath of the AMIA Bombing in Jewish Argentina. United States: Brill. ISBN 978-90-04-29749-4.
- McGuire, James (1997). Peronism without Perón. United States: Stanford University Press. ISBN 978-0-8047-3655-8.
- Reich, Bernard (2008). Historical Dictionary of Israel. United States: Scarecrow Press. ISBN 978-0-8108-6403-0.
- Romero, Luis Alberto (2013) [1994]. A History of Argentina in the Twentieth Century. United States: The Pennsylvania University Press. ISBN 978-0-271-06228-0.
- Ruggiero, Kristin (2005). The Jewish Diaspora in Latin America and the Caribbean: Fragments of Memory. United Kingdom: Sussex Academic Press. ISBN 978-1-84519-414-7.

Party political offices
Preceded by Antonio Cafiero	President of the Justicialist Party; 1990–2001; 2001–2003	Succeeded by Rubén Marín
Preceded by Rubén Marín	President of the Justicialist Party; 1990–2001; 2001–2003	Succeeded by Eduardo Fellner
Political offices
Preceded by Julio Raúl Luchesi; De facto	Governor of La Rioja; 1973–1976; 1983–1989	Succeeded by Osvaldo Héctor Pérez Battaglia; De facto
Preceded by Guillermo Jorge Piastrellini; De facto	Governor of La Rioja; 1973–1976; 1983–1989	Succeeded by Alberto Gregorio Cavero
Preceded by Raúl Alfonsín	President of Argentina; 1989–1999	Succeeded by Fernando de la Rúa
