= Fabiola =

Fabiola is a Spanish and Italian diminutive of the name Fabia or Fabiana, or the feminine version of Fabio or Fabiano. It may refer to:

== People ==
- Queen Fabiola of Belgium (1928-2014)
- Saint Fabiola, (fl. 395–399)
- Fabiola Letelier (1929–2021), Chilean lawyer, human rights activist
- Fabiola Gianotti (born 1962), Italian particle physicist
- Fabiola Campillai (born 1983), Chilean senator
- Anita Fabiola (born 1994), Ugandan television host and model
- Fabíola Mansur (born 1962), Brazilian politician
- Fabiola Ramírez (born 1990), Mexican Paralympic swimmer
- Fabiola Rodas (born 1993), Guatemalan singer songwriter
- Fabiola Valentín (born 1999), Miss Grand Puerto Rico 2020
- Fabiola Yáñez (born 1981), first lady of Argentina
- Fabiola Zavarce (born 1971), Venezuelan activist
- Fabiola Zuluaga (born 1979), Colombian tennis player
- Fabiola De Clercq (born 1950), Belgian-Italian writer
- Fabyula Badawi (born 1960), Egyptian poet and journalist

== Culture ==
- Fabiola (1918 film), a silent Italian film
- Fabiola (1949 film), a film known in English as The Fighting Gladiator
- Fabiola (novel), an 1854 novel by Cardinal Nicholas Wiseman

== Other ==
- 1576 Fabiola, Themistian asteroid
- Fabiola (moth), a concealer moth genus in subfamily Oecophorinae
- MSC Fabiola, a container ship
- Queen Fabiola Mountains
