= Juliana Awada =

First Lady of Argentina from 2015 to 2019

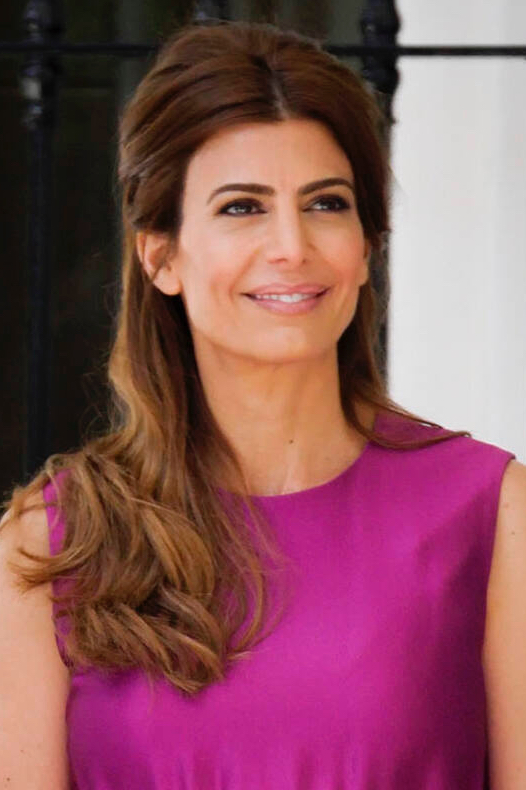
- Awada in 2018

First Lady of Argentina
- In role 10 December 2015 – 10 December 2019
- President: Mauricio Macri
- Preceded by: Néstor Kirchner (As First Gentleman, 2010)
- Succeeded by: Fabiola Yáñez

First Lady of Buenos Aires
- In role 16 November 2010 – 10 December 2015
- Preceded by: Eva Píccolo
- Succeeded by: Bárbara Díez de Tejada

Personal details
- Born: María Juliana Awada; 3 April 1974 (age 52) Villa Ballester, Argentina
- Party: Republican Proposal
- Other political affiliations: Cambiemos
- Spouse(s): Gustavo Capello (m. 1997; div. 1998) Mauricio Macri (m. 2010; sep. 2025)
- Domestic partner: Bruno Laurent Barbier (1998–1999)
- Children: 2
- Relatives: Alejandro Awada (brother)
- Occupation: Businesswoman

María Juliana Awada (born 3 April 1974) is an Argentine businesswoman who served as the first lady of Argentina from 2015 to 2019. She is the first woman in this role to have received the distinction of the Knight Grand Cross of the Order of Isabella the Catholic in 70 years and the second in history after Eva Perón in 1947.

== Background ==
Awada was born in Villa Ballester on 3 April 1974, the daughter of Ibrahim Awada, a Lebanese Muslim immigrant from the city of Baalbek, and Elsa Esther (née Baker), a Syrian-Lebanese Christian. She is the sister of entrepreneurs Zoraida and Daniel Awada, artist Leila Awada, and actor Alejandro Awada.

During her childhood and adolescence, she repeatedly traveled with her mother to Europe and the United States, mainly to Paris, London and New York, looking for fashion collections. After completing her secondary education at the now defunct Chester College, a bilingual English school in Belgrano, she continued studying in Oxford, England.

When she returned to Argentina, she was actively involved in the family business, a textile company set up by her father in the 1960s. In 1997, she married Gustavo Capello, whom she would divorce one year later. Later, she was in a relationship with Belgian businessman Bruno Laurent Barbier, whom she had met on an Air France flight. They lived together for almost ten years. They did not marry, and had a daughter named Valentina.

=== First Lady of Buenos Aires ===
Awada and Mauricio Macri began a relationship in 2009. They wed on 16 November 2010 and have one daughter, Antonia, born in 2011. In an interview with La Nación newspaper in 2012, she stated that her father is a liberal Muslim who did not object to one of Juliana's sisters marrying a Christian and the other a Jew. Macri and Awada would end their relationship, separating, in late 2025.

== Role in 2015 Argentine general election ==
Awada played an important role during the campaign of her husband, Mauricio Macri, in the presidential elections. At first with an extremely low profile, Juliana always differed from the other wives of the presidential candidates, who had been much more prominent in the campaigns of their husbands. But the campaign advisers sought to turn their profile and make it much more visible for the campaign. She joined the campaign of Maria Eugenia Vidal in the Province of Buenos Aires in a tour of the party of José C. Paz, where they visited the Zonal Hospital of Agudos Governor Domingo Mercante, and talked with neighbors and merchants in Plaza Manuel Belgrano of that locality. Awada was concerned about the hospital's building situation.

She was present during the presidential debate that took place in the Law College of the University of Buenos Aires, between her husband Mauricio Macri against the candidate Daniel Scioli. After the debate, the wives of both candidates came onstage to accompany their husbands, and Awada and Macri had an intense kiss that was later replicated by the media in Argentina.

== Human trafficking ==
Juliana Awada, as a textile businesswoman, was involved in a human trafficking scandal in 2010. Her companies Awada and Cheeky allegedly bought their clothes from illegal factories where slave labour was commonly used. The first complaint was made by the organization La Alameda against the firm Awada, accusing it of violating immigration law (art 117 to 121) and the home work law (art 4, 35 and 36) in the workshops where they made their garments and for which she is jointly responsible, and was carried out on October 18 before the Federal Prosecutor's Office of Patricio Evers and subsequently fell into another lawsuit that at that time was administered by Dr. Oyarbide.

Given the passivity of the Federal Court in response to the complaint, in March 2008 a report was filmed, together with teams from América TV, on various clandestine workshops in the city of San Martín, near Buenos Aires, that worked for major brands, including Awada. These investigations were broadcast on the air on March 12, 2008.

On May 14, 2008, a list of 30 workshops that worked for major brands were denounced before the Deputy Minister of Labor Gastón Guarracino, which included the two Awada workshops in Villa Ballester that had already been denounced and filmed in 2006 and 2008.

Most of these accusations fell moot after Awada became Mauricio Macri's wife, who was Buenos Aires head of government at the time and later became president of Argentina.

== First Lady of Argentina ==
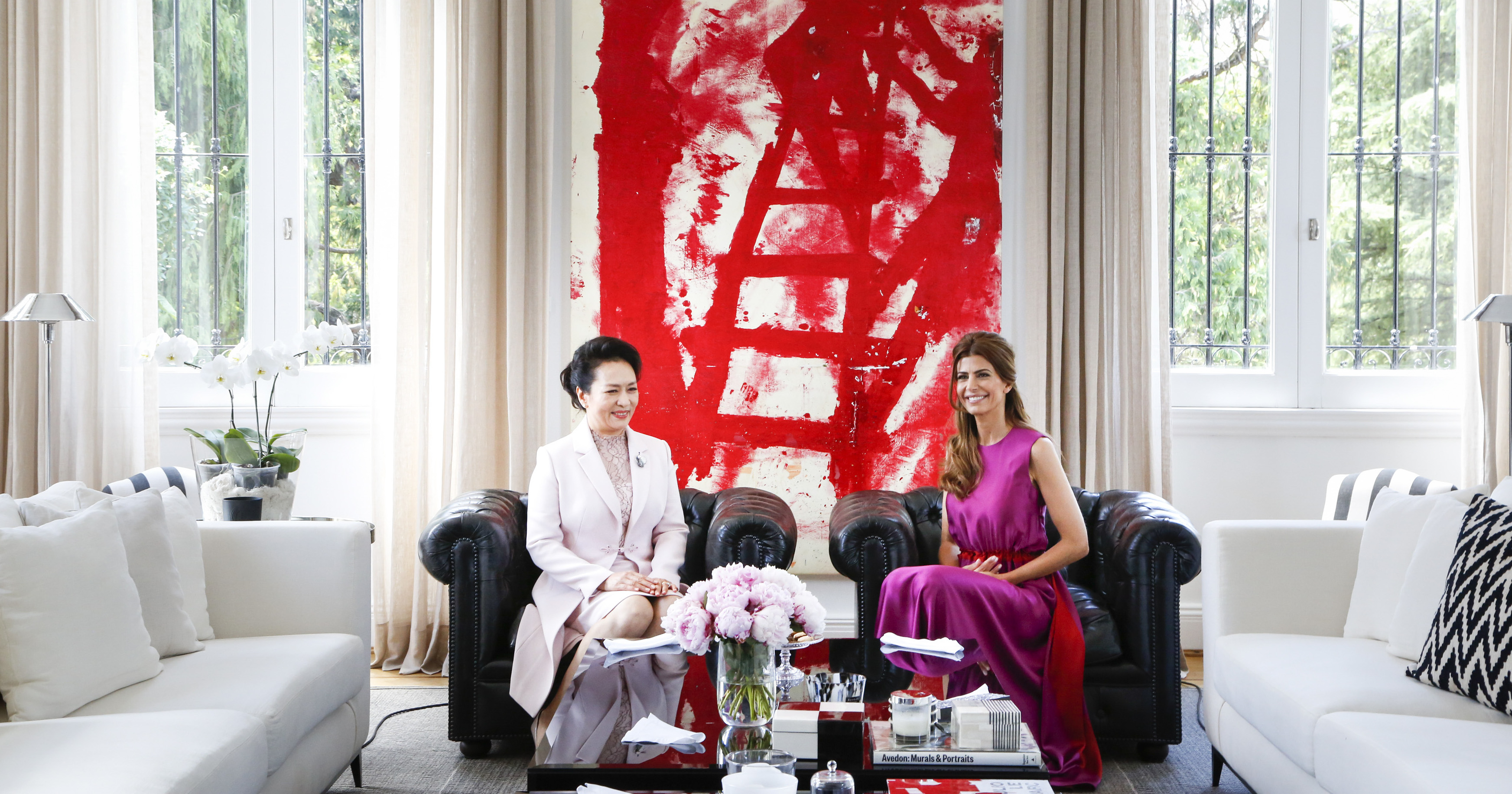
Awada with Peng Liyuan, First Lady of China in the Quinta de Olivos, Buenos Aires, December 2018

In the 2015 presidential elections held on 25 October, Mauricio Macri, candidate of the alliance Cambiemos (Let's Change), formed by the Republican Proposal, the Radical Civic Union and the Civic Coalition ARI, came second with 34.33% of the vote, while the candidate of the Front for Victory, Daniel Scioli, it outstripped by little difference. In a historic ballotage, the first to be held in Argentina, Mauricio Macri won with 51.34% of the votes, becoming the successor of Cristina Fernandez de Kirchner, and Awada consequently, in the First Lady of Argentina.

On 10 December 2015, Awada accompanied her husband during his inauguration as President. The ceremony starting from their apartment in the neighborhood of Recoleta at the corner of Avenida del Libertador and Cavia at 11:00am to the National Congress of Argentina where Macri delivered a speech of 27 minutes. Later they went to the Casa Rosada, where Macri received the presidential attributes in the White Hall of the Casa Rosada. After being anointed President, she and her husband gave a reception at the San Martín Palace of Argentina Foreign Ministry to all the heads of state present: Michelle Bachelet from Chile, Horacio Cartes from Paraguay, Juan Manuel Santos from Colombia, Rafael Correa from Ecuador, Evo Morales from Bolivia, Dilma Rousseff from Brazil, and representatives of other countries attending the inauguration. Buenos Aires Governor María Eugenia Vidal confirmed that the First Lady is her personal advisor regarding her wardrobe. Awada and President Mauricio Macri alongside her daughters Antonia and Valentina lives in the Presidential Residence of Quinta de Olivos.

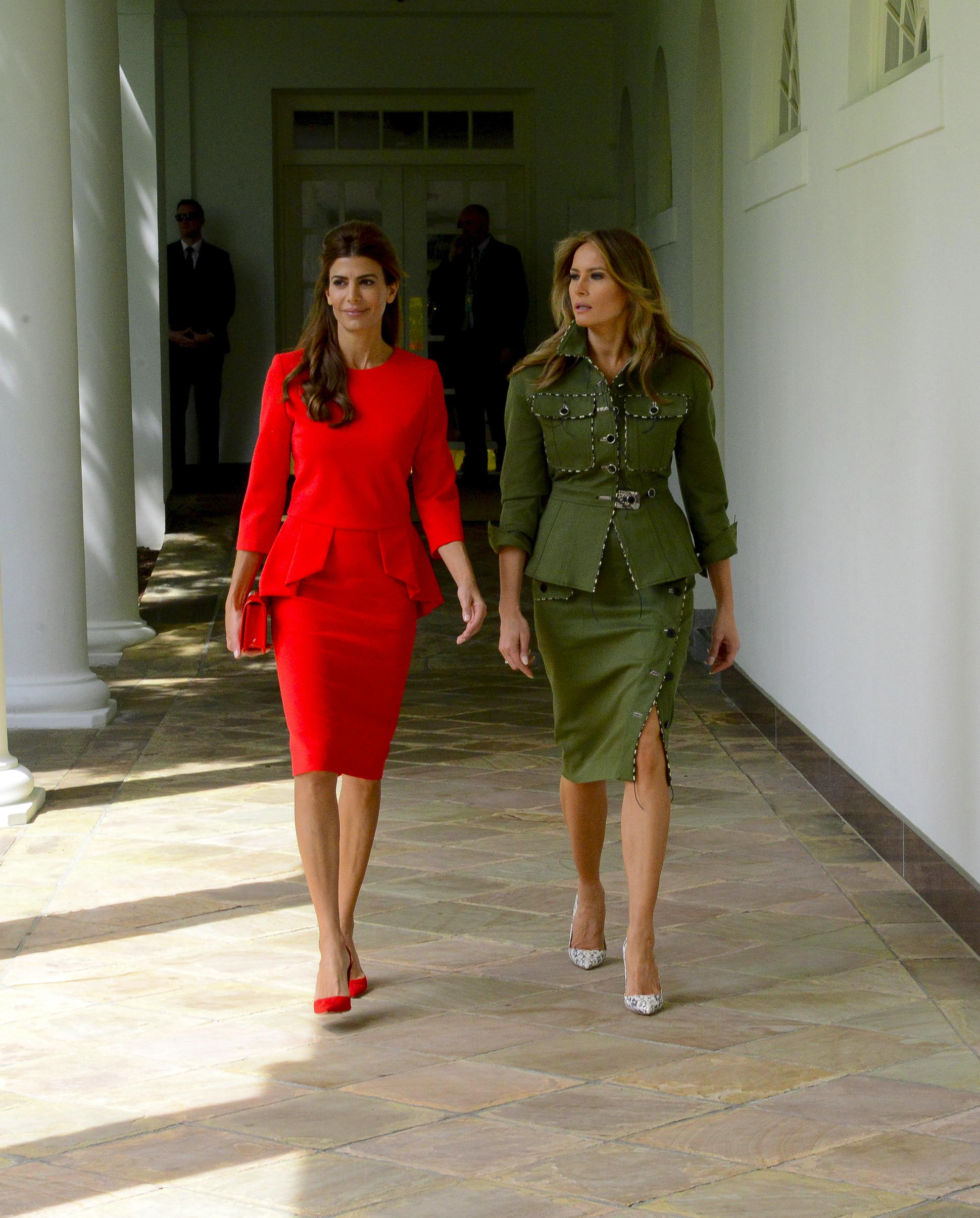
Awada alongside US First Lady, Melania Trump in the White House, April 2017

On 23 March 2016, she gave her first speech at the Metropolitan Design Center (CMD) of the Buenos Aires neighborhood of Barracas, where she presented her counterpart Michelle Obama. Both First Ladies gave a talk to teens to raise awareness about the importance of education. This speech was held during the official visit made by the Obama family to Argentina on 23–24 March 2016, where they also visited the city of Bariloche, in the Argentine Patagonia.

In June 2016, the first lady welcomed the Second lady of the United States, Jill Biden, and emphasized her commitment to education and her work in defense of equal rights for women. Awada received the wife of Vice President of the United States, Joe Biden in the Presidential Residence of Olivos and shared with her then the visit to a Space of First Childhood in the locality of San Martin, Buenos Aires. After a talk they kept in the presidential villa, she invited her to visit the fifth and the organic garden that she cultivates herself in the gardens of the residence. The first lady and Minister, Carolina Stanley explained to Biden details of the objectives and role of these centers in the framework of the policy of comprehensive care for children carried out by the Government with the National Early Childhood Network. "Jill Biden is an incredible woman, who is always thinking of improving the future of the people in her community," said Awada. She emphasized that she has made "great contributions and was able to promote many positive changes from her vocation and commitment to education, her experience as a combatant's mother, her role in helping women prevent cancer and their participation for women's equality ".

In November 2016, the first lady received the spouse of the Prime Minister of Japan, Akie Abe in Buenos Aires. They shared various activities in the Buenos Aires Japanese Gardens, located in the neighborhood of Palermo, as part of the official visit by the Prime Minister, Shinzo Abe to Argentina. They witnessed a musical show of the Group of Japanese Drums-Buenos Aires Taiko of which took part members of the Band Tacuarí of the Regiment of Patricians. Later, they participated in the tea ceremony, essence of the Japanese cultural manifestations, and finally visited an exhibition of Bonsai in the facilities of that thematic garden. It was 130 years since the arrival of the Japanese community in Argentina and next year will be the 120th anniversary of the establishment of diplomatic relations.

=== Foreign trips ===
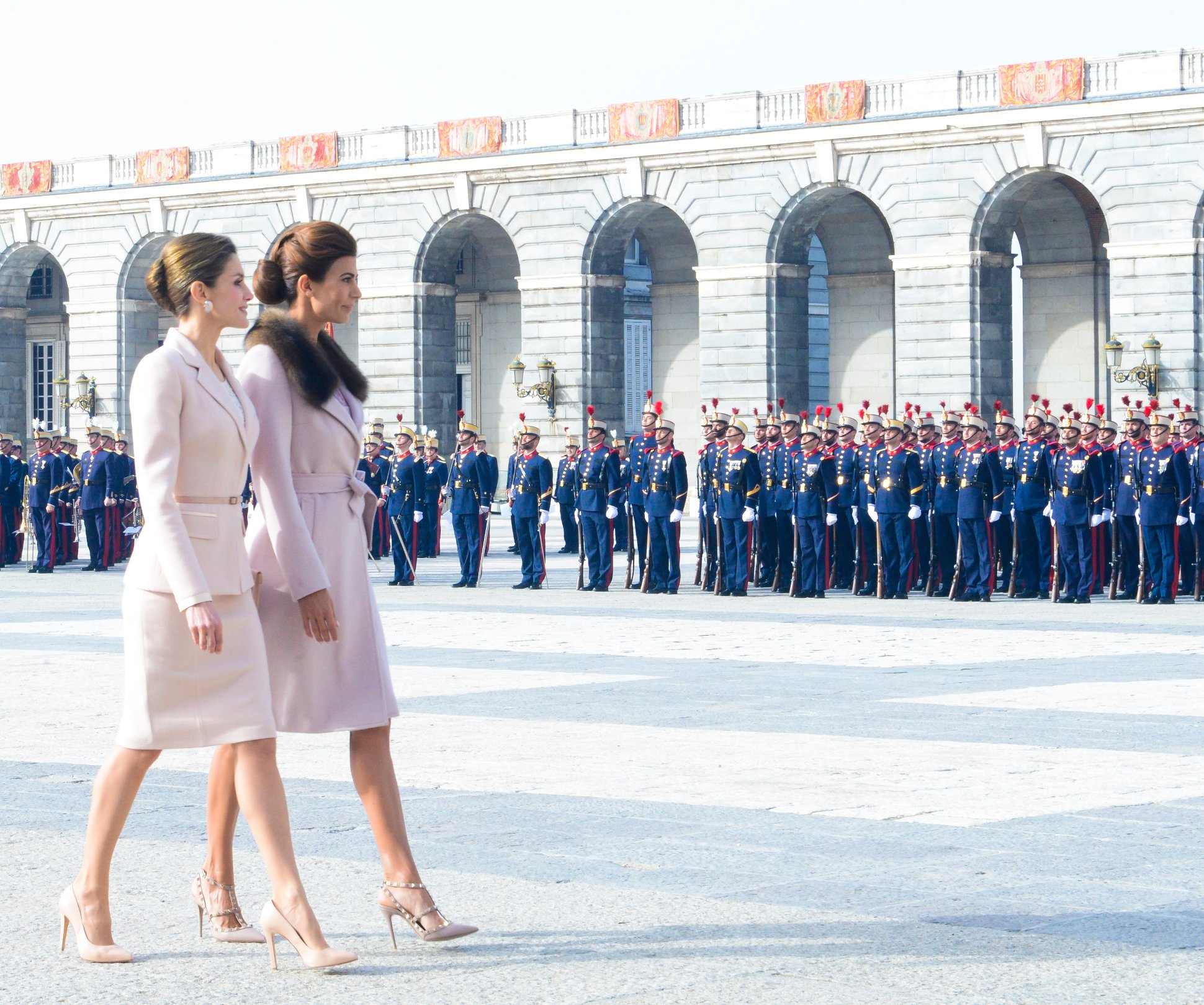
First Lady Awada alongside Queen Letizia at Royal Palace of Madrid during a state visit to Spain, 2017

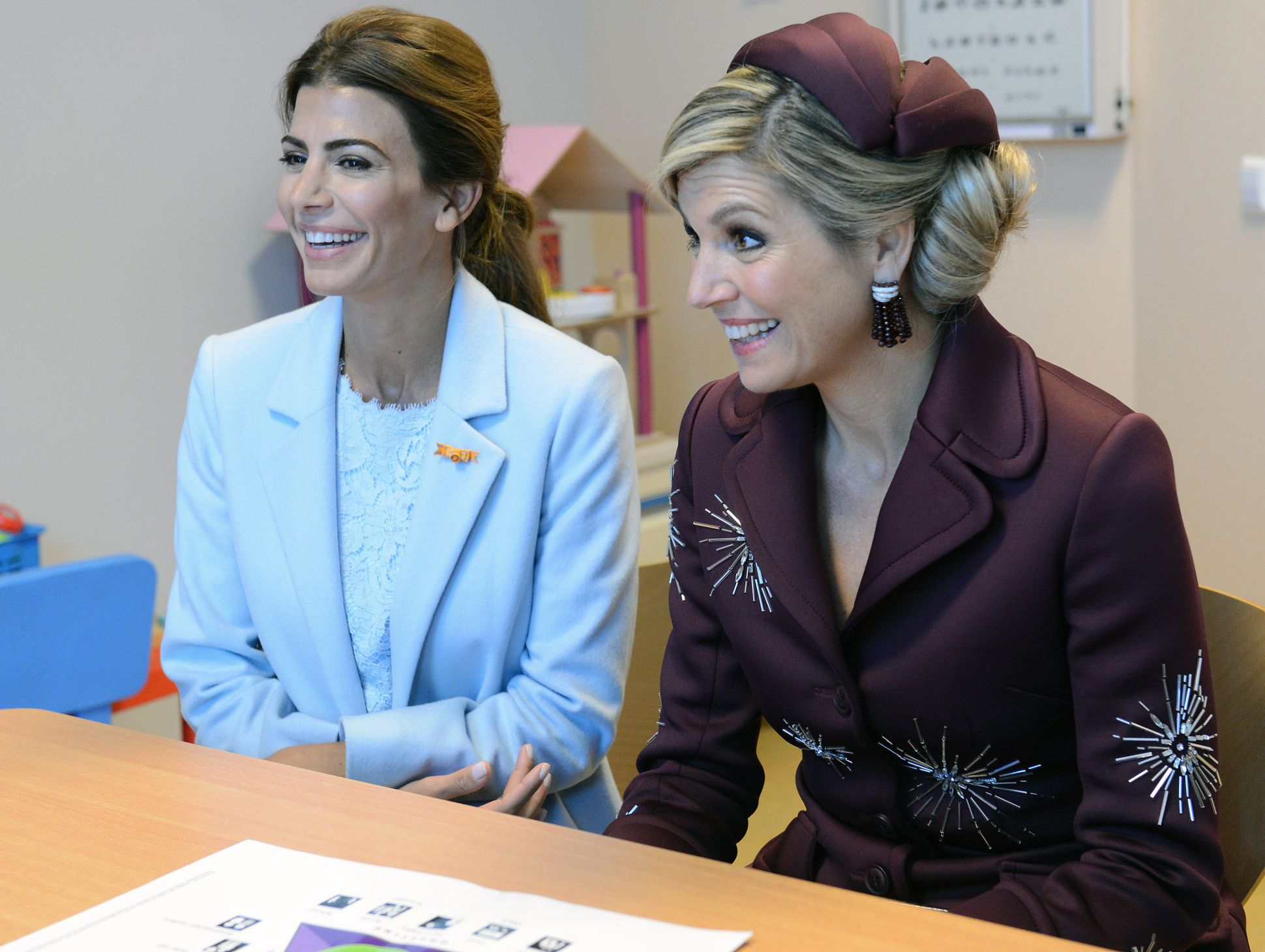
Awada alongside Queen Máxima of the Netherlands in Amsterdam

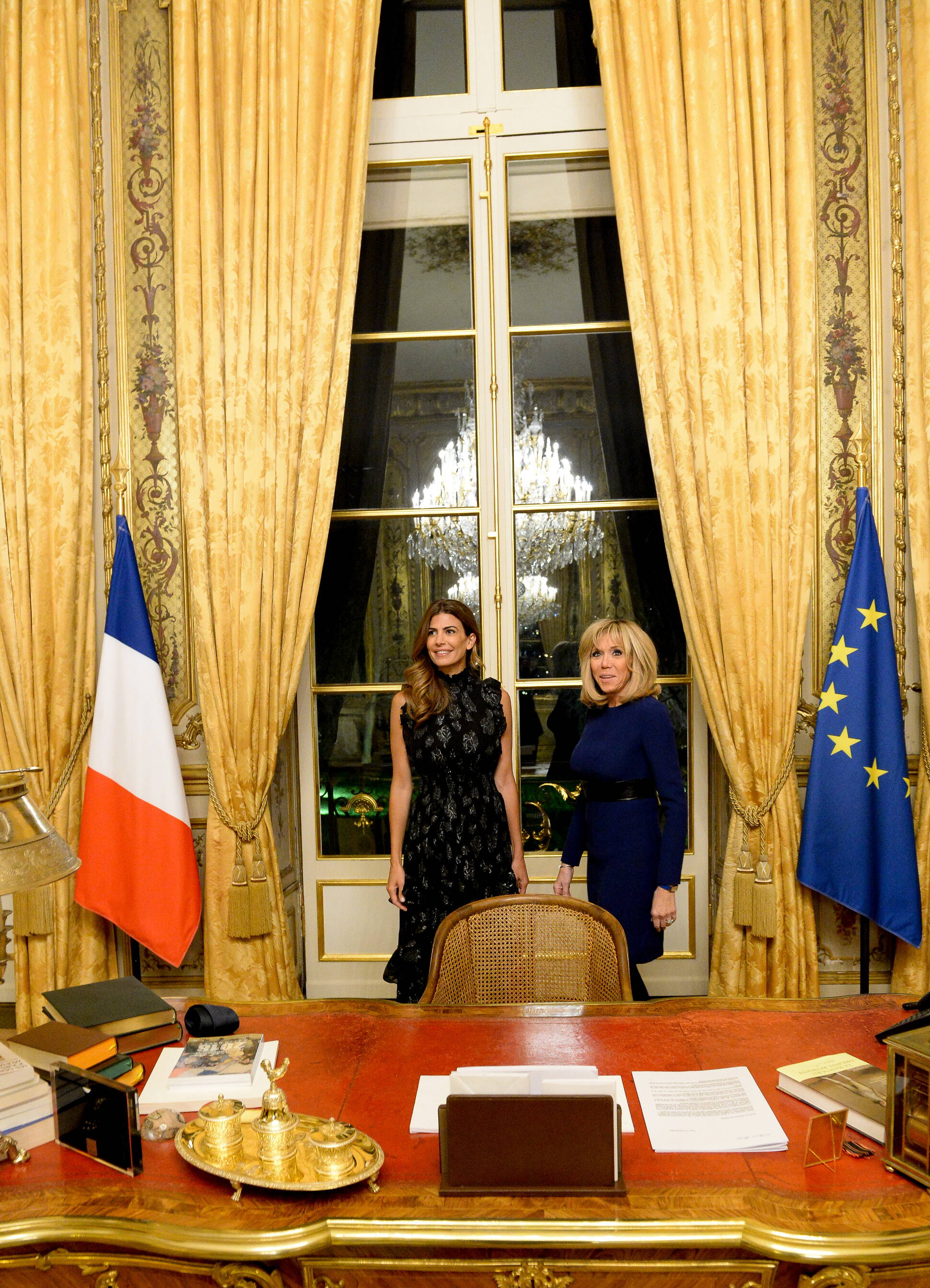
First Lady Awada alongside Brigitte Macron, First Lady of France in the Elysee Palace, Paris, 2018

Awada made her first international trip as First Lady of Argentina to Davos, Switzerland to accompany her husband during the 2016 World Economic Forum. She and her husband met with Queen Máxima of the Netherlands and the Prime Minister of the Netherlands, Mark Rutte, in a meeting that lasted about 30 minutes. At the meeting, there was a commitment to relaunch the bilateral relationship and to expand flights between the two countries.

On 27 February 2016, she met with Pope Francis at the Vatican City where she and her husband, President Macri were invited. It was the second time Awada met with the Pope, the first was in 2013 when she was the First Lady of Buenos Aires. The next day she attended a meeting between her husband and the Italian President, Sergio Mattarella at the Quirinale Palace in Rome.

In July 2016, The First Lady and the President Macri started a European tour that took them to France, Belgium and Germany, where the President sought to project his international leadership as a political and commercial partner of the European Union. Macri and Awada held in Paris a meeting with French President Francois Hollande, and Berlin with German Chancellor Angela Merkel, in this case in the context of a two-day official visit. In addition to meeting with the two leaders brunt of the European Union, the President was received in Brussels by the European Council President Donald Tusk, the High Representative of the European Union for Foreign Affairs, Federica Mogherini. The President and the First Lady were received by King Philip and Queen Mathilde at the Royal Palace of Brussels.

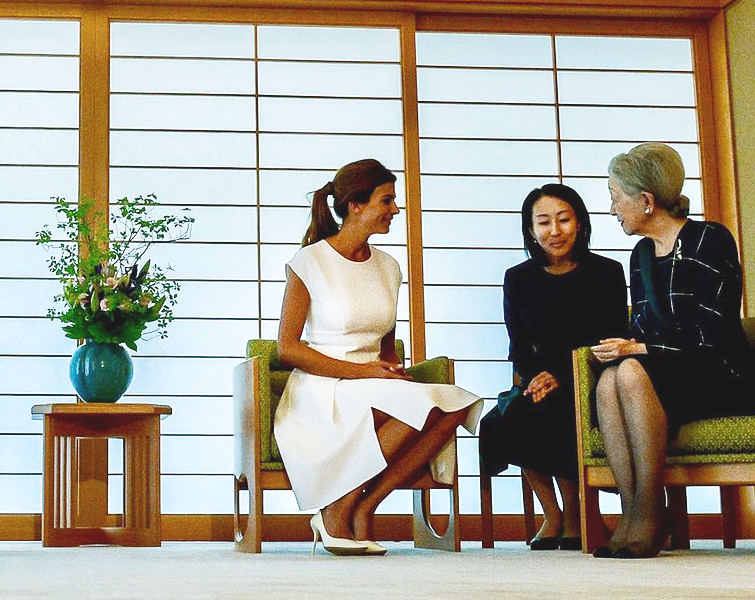
Awada in a meeting with Empress Michiko of Japan, Tokyo, 2017

In September 2016 Awada accompanied her husband to the G-20 Summit held in Hangzhou. During the summit, she fulfilled a personal agenda, on her first day visited a buddhist temple and a pedestrian street of handicrafts. At the next day she visited the Zhejiang University and participate in an activity at the China Academy of Art.

In February 2017, President Mauricio Macri and the First Lady began a state visit to Spain. The First Lady and Queen Letizia spoke about the ties that unite both countries and agreed on the importance of working in the care of children and the integral development of women. "I am very grateful to have the opportunity to come to this country with Mauricio representing Argentina. It is an honor and a great responsibility that I take with great enthusiasm, "said Awada after his meeting with the Queen, in the Palace of Zarzuela. The meeting between Awada and Letizia took place in parallel to the meeting of the Head of State with King Felipe VI of Spain. The President's wife brought the Queen a bracelet inspired by Pampa, silver-plated, by designer Federico Álzaga. "We talked about our roles, our countries with so much history and ties in common, and also about what we live as women and as mothers of two girls. I felt very comfortable and the conversation flowed naturally", she said.

In March 2017, President Macri and the First Lady began a state visit to the Netherlands. During their stay in Amsterdam were received by King Willem-Alexander and Queen Máxima in the Dam Square. Macri and Awada, accompanied by Queen Maxima, visited the Anne Frank House, where they were received by the Deputy Mayor of Amsterdam, Kasja Ollongren; The director of the Anne Frank Foundation, Leonard Leopold; And by the director of the Foundation in Argentina, Hector Shalom. "I am very touched by the story of Anne Frank. It is always an inspiration to work for a better life and for human rights," wrote the first lady, Juliana Awada, in the House of Honor book of honor where the Jewish girl hid from The Nazi persecution with his family.

=== Argentine art promoter ===
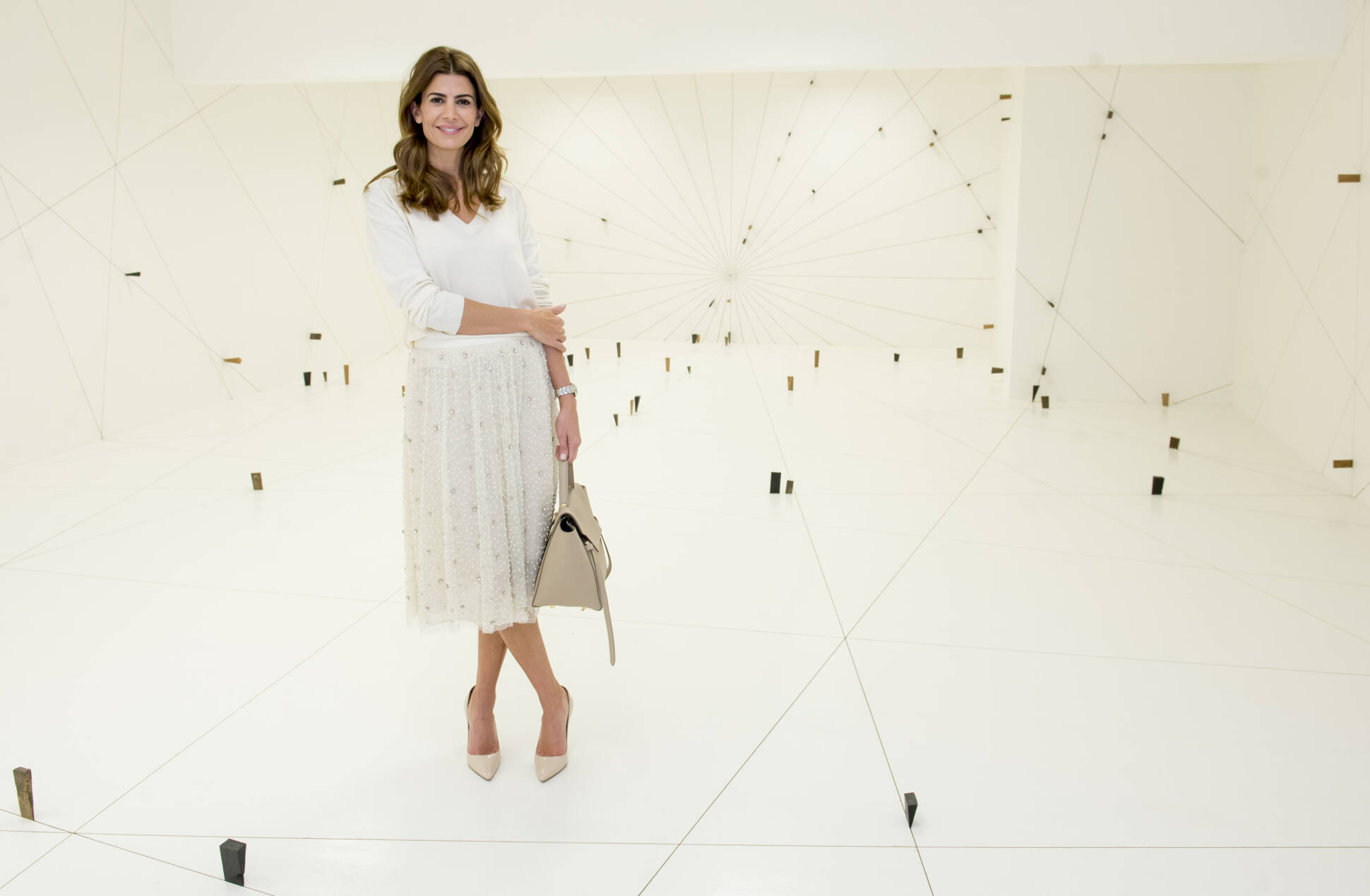
The First Lady visiting the BienalSur, an exhibition of Argentine Art, Buenos Aires

The First Lady is a promoter of Argentine art in the world. Since her time as First Lady of Buenos Aires she has been involved in exhibitions at the Latin American Art Museum of Buenos Aires and in the Buenos Aires Museum of Modern Art. As First Lady of Argentina, she promoted Argentine art in the Latin American region as well as in Europe.

In March 2017, President Mauricio Macri and the first lady, participated in the opening ceremony of the new Güemes Museum in honor Martín Miguel de Güemes, together with the Governor of Salta, Juan Manuel Urtubey, and his wife, Isabel Macedo. The restoration and reconstruction work of the National Historical Monument, which contains the Museum, in the city of Salta, maintains the original premises and the different materials and technologies of the building. The content of the Museum was agreed with institutions and specialized researchers, and its result is the result of the creation of more than 100 people among filmmakers, screenwriters, actors, sculptors, musicians, designers, technicians and assistants. Visiting the museum, visitors can meet the "gaucho hero" through modern audio-visual resources and exhibition techniques, including scenic effects, lighting and multimedia programs.

Awada inaugurated the ARCO Fair (Feria Internacional de Arte Contemporáneo) of Madrid 2017 with Queen Letizia in Madrid, where Argentina was the guest country of honor. "The fact that Argentina is the guest country of honor in this new edition of ARCO is a huge pride and a further demonstration of the stage we are going through," said First Lady Awada, visiting the contemporary art fair together to President Mauricio Macri and King Felipe VI of Spain. She was in charge of choosing all the Argentine artists who will have a place in the exhibition. "I am sure that this participation will be a milestone in the history of our culture because it will position us in the world in a new and much stronger way. And the most beautiful thing is that Madrid was full of Argentine artists" she emphasized.

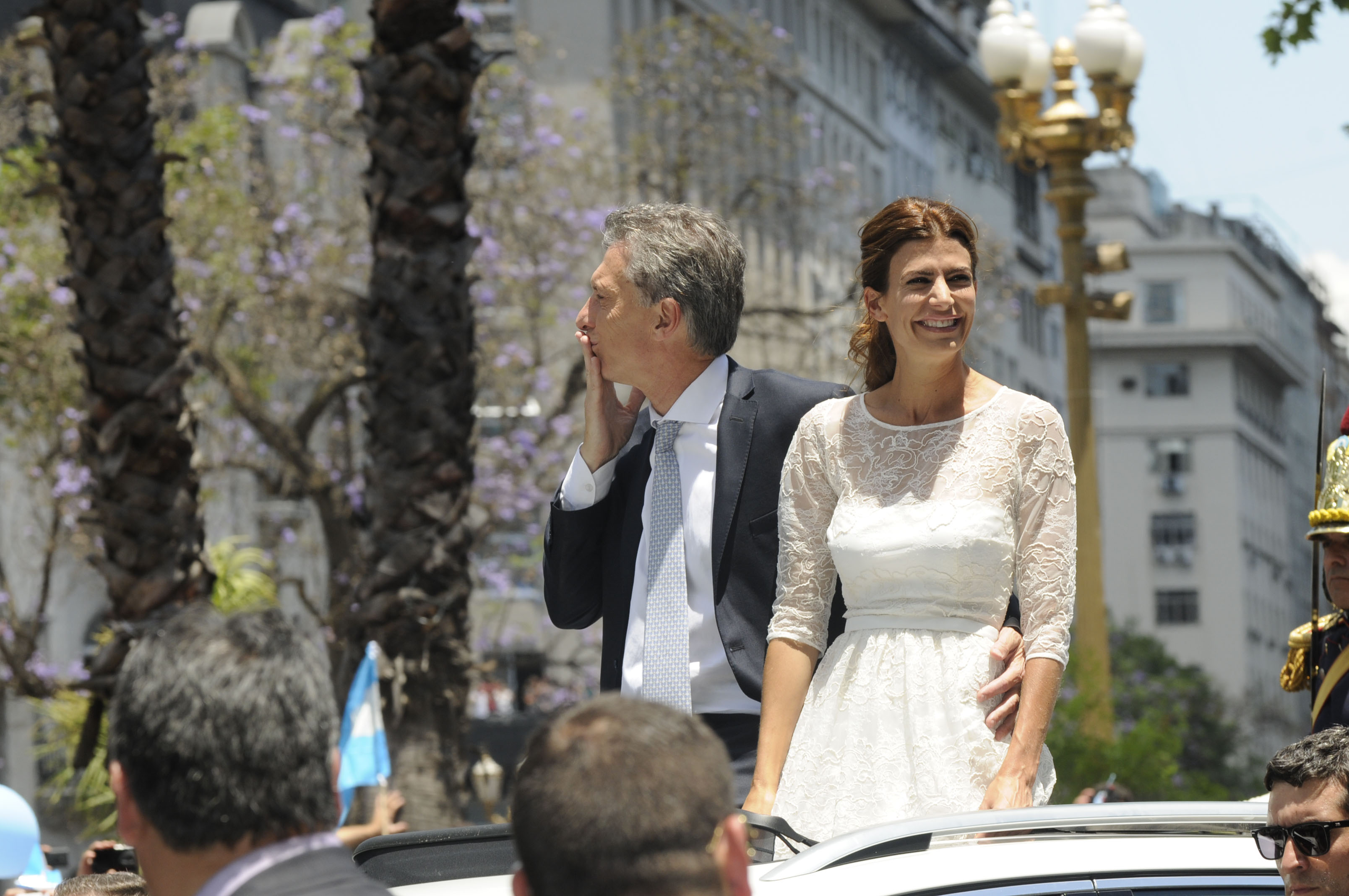
Awada and Macri during the 2015 Presidential Inaugural Parade, in Buenos Aires

The First Lady completely remodeled the Presidential Residence of Olivos, choosing as part of the decoration works by different artists from all over Argentina, especially an artist from the Province of Salta, named Mariano Cornejo.

=== Social work ===
In November 2016, Awada and the Minister of Social Development, Carolina Stanley visited in the province of Córdoba an Early Childhood Space, a social dining room and a family enterprise. "Something I learned from Mauricio and the people he works with is the importance of being close to, caring for, always accompanying those who need it the most," said the First Lady. Awada also internalized on the projects of complementary financing that executed the social portfolio in order to improve the building situation and to provide equipment and supplies. President Mauricio Macri's wife stressed that the teams of workers who support these initiatives "leave everything to hundreds of children and families to have better opportunities." "Their work is very valuable. I deeply admire people who live to help others", she said.

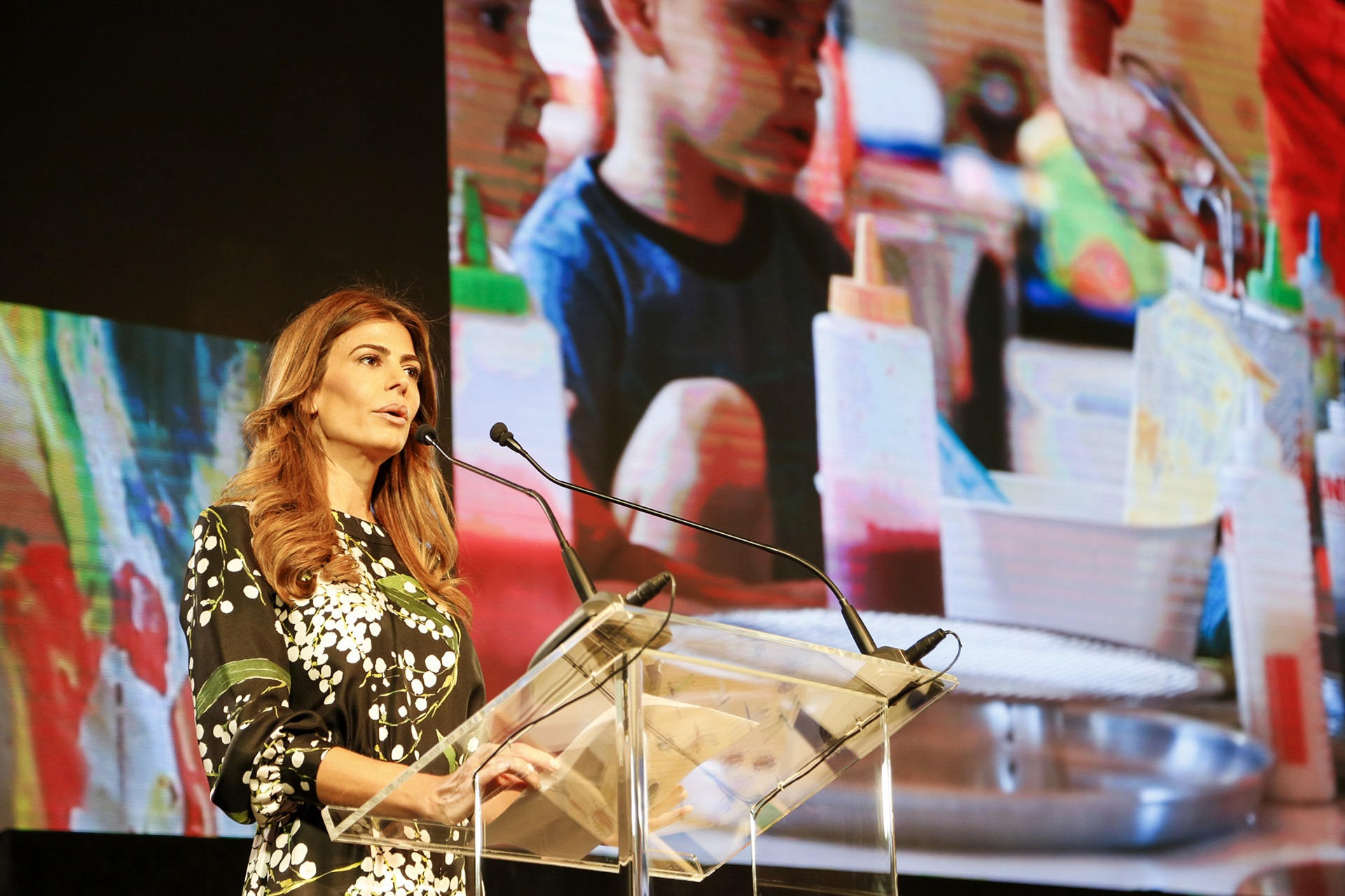
Awada delivering a speech in the MALBA

In March 2017, the first lady alongside the Ministry of Social Development, Carolina Stanley, visited the property of the Civil Walking Association, which, assisted by the Government, works to generate opportunities for people with disabilities. "Here the children start projects, learn trades, hold workshops and discover what they like to do," said the wife of President Mauricio Macri. Awada and Stanley toured the Andar Organization, located in the Buenos Aires district of Moreno, where for two decades groups of professionals have promoted social inclusion through work, sport, art, culture and health. She also highlighted the work of social organizations of this type that "help raise awareness and make a great contribution for people with Down syndrome to be part of society, without taboos and without limits, as it should be." In that context, he remarked that "there is much that can be achieved when children are stimulated from childhood, given an inclusive education and, above all, when they are shown confidence." The Ministry of Social Development collaborates with Andar Organization through the food security program and provides infrastructure and machinery through the institutional strengthening program. In addition to providing microcredit, she joined the institution in the Pro Huerta Plan, which provides tools for setting up organic gardens in their own spaces. The organization develops a therapeutic program to help young people with various disabilities and conducts workshops to improve their quality of life, achieve more autonomy. The young people also participate in a productive program that includes work at the "Pan de Esperanza" bakery.

== Public image and style ==
In 2016 she was named one of the "best dressed" women in the world according to Vogue magazine. Her current style has been compared with other famous First Ladies such as Jacqueline Kennedy. Vogue Spain prepared a special issue for April issue with a particular coverage on Argentine fashion, Awada which was the main protagonist. The interview was conducted in the middle of what was BAFWEEK. The production was done in the Teatro Colón of Buenos Aires. Awada chose to wear national and Spanish designs.

Awada appeared on the cover and in a photo spread in the June 2016 issue of Vogue Latin América. In the magazine, the First Lady declared: "The Argentines have to be united, working together to have the country we deserve" and she declared that her husband works close to people inviting all to move the country forward, respecting the differences and similarities.

She was chosen the most elegant First Lady in the world in 2016 according to the magazine ¡Hola!.

== Honors ==
- Italy: Knight Grand Cross of the Order of Merit of the Italian Republic (2 May 2017)
- Netherlands: Grand Cross of the Order of the Crown (27 March 2017)
- Norway: Grand Cross of the Royal Norwegian Order of Merit (6 March 2018)
- Spain: Dame Grand Cross of the Order of Isabella the Catholic (20 February 2017)

Honorary titles
Preceded by Eva Píccolo	First Lady of Buenos Aires; 2010–2015	Succeeded by Bárbara Diez
Vacant Title last held by Néstor Kirchner as First Gentleman	First Lady of Argentina; 2015–2019	Succeeded by Fabiola Yáñez
