= Conan (Javier Milei's dog) =

English mastiff adopted by Javier Milei (2004–2017)

- Species: Canis familiaris
- Breed: English Mastiff
- Sex: Male
- Born: 2004; Buenos Aires Province, Argentina
- Died: May 2017 (aged 12–13); Argentina
- Owner: Javier Milei
- Named after: Conan the Barbarian

Conan (2004 – May 2017) was an English Mastiff adopted by Argentina’s president Javier Milei as a puppy in 2004, and named after the title character in the 1982 film Conan the Barbarian. Milei, who never married and is childless, referred to Conan as his closest friend and confidant. Conan died from spinal cancer in 2017.

In 2018, Milei cloned Conan into several other dogs. Milei's interactions with his dogs have attracted controversy and international attention since Milei's 2023 Argentine presidential election campaign.

== Life ==
Conan was born around 2004, and Milei took him as a puppy that year and treated him as a family member. In 2018, Milei told Perfil that Conan is his "true and greatest love" (verdadero y más grande amor) and "literally a son to me". He also reportedly gave Conan champagne.

In May 2017, Conan died as a result of spinal cancer. Milei then began consulting with a medium. Milei came to believe he met Conan in a previous life as a gladiator and lion who refused to fight because they knew they were destined to work together in a grand project, which he believes was a prophecy of his bid for the Argentine presidency.

Of Conan's death, Milei said that he had not really died (he called it "his physical disappearance" and continued to refer to Conan in the present tense) but gone to sit next to God to protect him, and that it was thanks to this that he had begun to have talks with God himself.

== Cloning ==
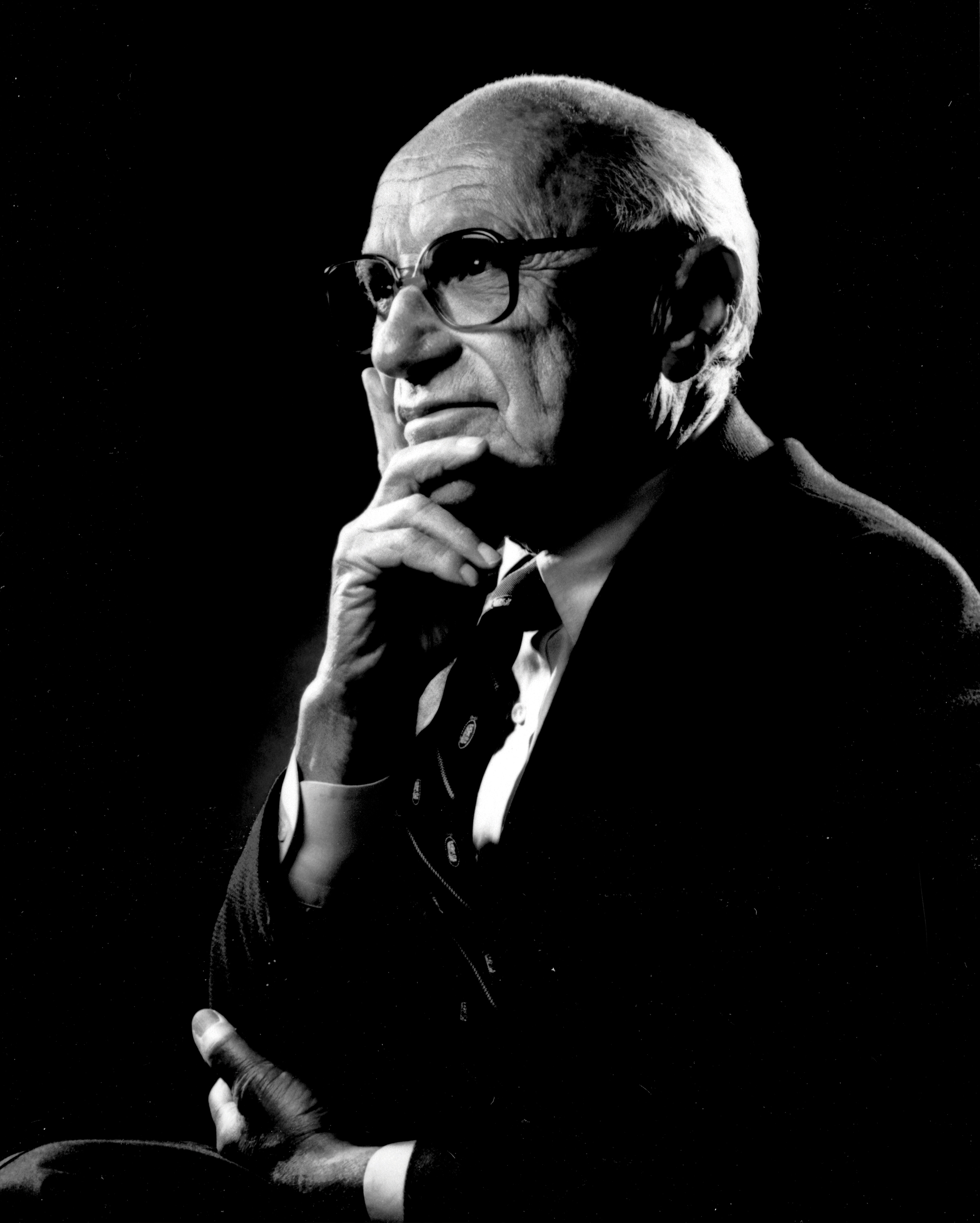
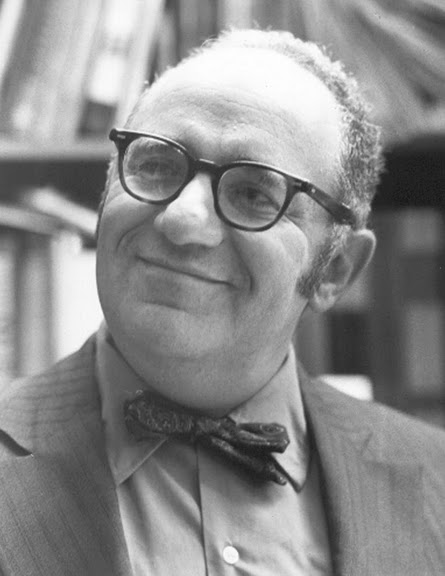
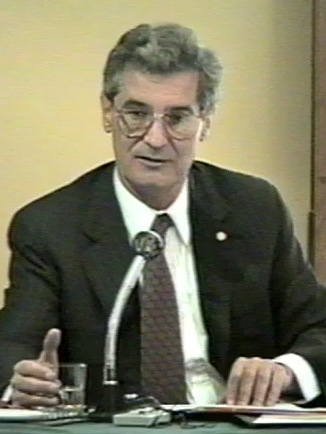
From left to right are American economists Milton Friedman (1912–2006), Murray Rothbard (1926–1995), and Robert Lucas Jr. (1937–2023). Four out of six of Conan's clones were named after them.

In 2018, Milei paid US-based company PerPETuate, Inc $50,000 to clone Conan. The procedure resulted in six puppies. Milei said that he cloned Conan because he believes cloning is "a way of approaching eternity".

Milei named one of the puppies Conan, whom he does not distinguish from the original Conan. He named four more puppies after prominent members of the Chicago and Austrian schools of economics: Milton (named after Milton Friedman), Murray (after Murray Rothbard), Robert and Lucas (both named after Robert Lucas Jr). He declared he considers these dogs as Conan's offspring and his own grandsons. The sixth dog, who died shortly after the procedure, was named Angelito which means "little angel." Milei refers to the dogs as his "four-legged children".

== 2023 presidential campaign ==
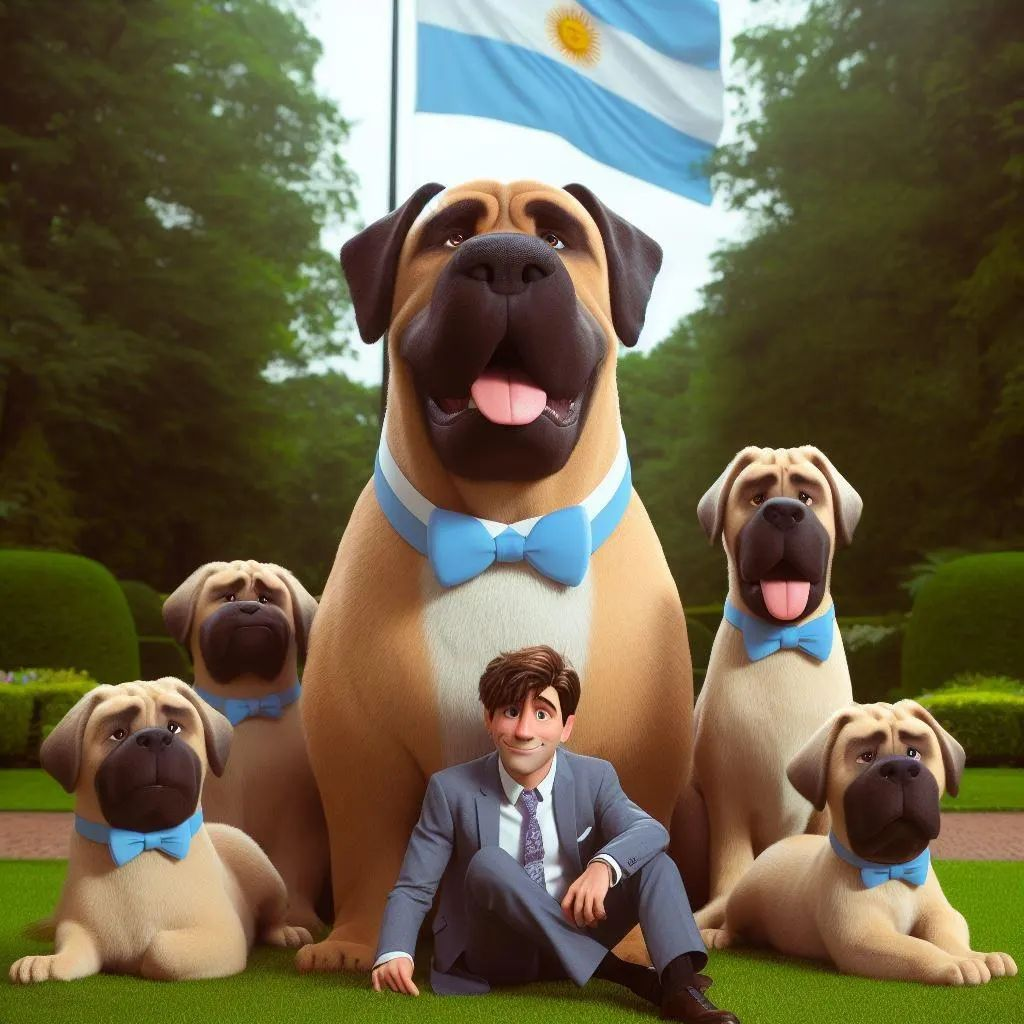
Described by Milei as his "family album", this AI-generated image was his first Instagram post after being elected president.

Since Milei's rise to prominence in politics, Conan and the other mastiffs cloned after him attracted international attention due to Milei's comments about them. Milei does not distinguish between the current cloned Conan and the original, considering both to be his son, and the other puppies his grandchildren. He has claimed to receive policy and campaign advice from his dogs, and thanked them after his win in the 2023 Argentine primary elections.

Ron Gillespie, who runs PerPETuate, a genetic preservation company in Hawaii, said about Milei's cloned mastiffs: "I don't have a vote in the Argentine election, but I do have five dogs in the race." Milei maintains that he and Conan have a mission assigned to them by God. According to various sources consulted by La Nación, Milei maintains that he and Conan first met in a previous life more than 2,000 years ago as a gladiator and a lion in the Roman Colosseum, and that the pair did not fight because they were destined to join forces in the future, referring to his presidential campaign.

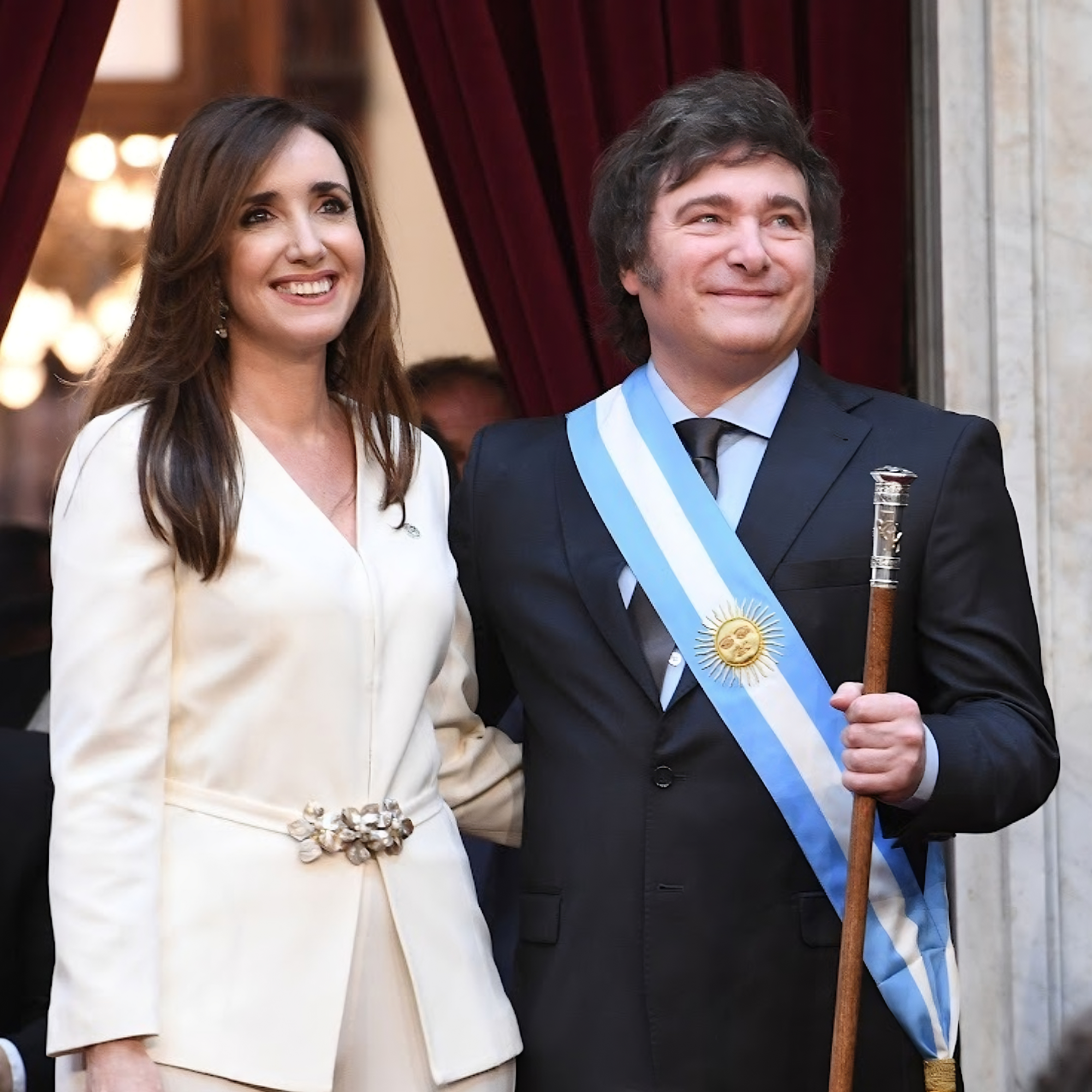
Conan's owner Javier Milei as president of Argentina with vice president Victoria Villarruel at their inauguration on 10 December 2023

On 24 November 2023, Milei shared an AI-generated image on his Instagram that depicts himself and his five dogs (with one of them much larger than the others in reference to Conan), calling it his "family album" in the caption. The image, which was widely commented on online, was his first post on the social network after being elected president five days earlier.

On his inauguration as Argentina's president, Milei broke with the tradition of using an official presidential baton (Spanish: bastón presidencial) carved by goldsmith Juan Carlos Pallarols, opting for a design featuring Conan and his four clones carved on it. According to sources consulted by Clarín, Milei will bring his four dogs to live with him in the Quinta de Olivos (the official presidential residence), which has caused security concerns among the staff there, as they are known to be "problematic". Milei announced that the presidential residence would be renovated to accommodate the four dogs, who are used to living separately.

== Conversations with dogs ==
Milei allegedly stated that he communicates with the dogs through a mystic, and that he seeks counseling from them. He also allegedly commented that the new Conan provides ideas on general strategy, Robert is the one who makes him "see the future and learn from mistakes", Milton is in charge of political analysis, and Murray of the economy. When asked about this by El País journalist Martín Sivak and Nicolás Lucca of Radio Rivadavia, Milei did not deny it, and said: "What I do with my spiritual life and in my house is my business. If Conan were to advise me on politics, considering how I did, it'd mean that he's the best consultant of humanity." In addition to having dialogues with the likes of Rothbard and Ayn Rand, Milei allegedly cited Conan as a source of inspiration for his writings in 2015.

There have also been questions in terms of how many dogs Milei had in 2024. Milei said he had five dogs, but in photographs he only appears with four dogs. Milei's spokesperson asked why the matter of number of dogs Milei has is important. One journalist responded, "if the president has four dogs, and he sees five, we are talking about a person who sees something that does not match reality".

== See also ==
- Dylan, pet dog owned by Milei's predecessor Alberto Fernández
- Commercial animal cloning
- List of animals that have been cloned
- List of individual dogs
