= Fabiana =

Fabiana may refer to:

- Fabiana (plant), a genus of evergreen shrubs
  - Fabiana imbricata
- Fabiana (name), a given name (includes a list of people with the name)
