= Dylan (dog) =

Argentine presidential dog (2016–2025)

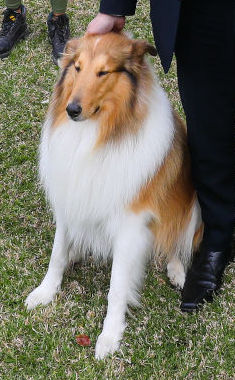
- Dylan in 2020
- Species: Canis lupus familiaris
- Breed: Rough Collie
- Sex: Male
- Born: 6 January 2016; Pilar, Buenos Aires Province, Argentina
- Died: 12 November 2025 (aged 9)
- Owner: Alberto Fernández
- Residence: Puerto Madero, Buenos Aires, Argentina
- Offspring: At least 6, including Prócer and Kaila
- Named after: Bob Dylan

Dylan (6 January 2016 – 12 November 2025) was a pet dog owned by former president of Argentina Alberto Fernández and his domestic partner Fabiola Yáñez. Dylan was a Rough Collie, and was named after American singer-songwriter Bob Dylan, whom Fernández admires.

== Life ==
Dylan was born in Pilar, in Buenos Aires Province, on 6 January 2016. After being adopted by Alberto Fernández and his domestic partner, Fabiola Yáñez, Dylan moved to the couple's home in the Puerto Madero neighborhood of Buenos Aires. He was named after Bob Dylan, whom Fernández has praised and cited as an inspiration on different occasions. In 2019, mere months before the announcement of Fernández's candidacy for the 2019 presidential election, an Instagram account was set up for Dylan; the account quickly became popular and, as of March 2020, has over 200,000 followers.

Dylan became a recognizable feature of Fernández's campaign. The Collie was present in Fernández's first campaign spot ahead of the 2019 primaries, and both Fernández and Yáñez shared photos with their pet dog on their social media accounts throughout the campaign.

Following Alberto Fernández's victory at the 2019 presidential election, Dylan and his then-only son, Prócer, moved to the Quinta de Olivos, the private residence of the Argentine president.

Dylan died on 12 November 2025, at the age of 9.

== Offspring ==
Dylan fathered four pups born in July 2019; only one of these pups was kept by the Fernández household, a male. Dylan's son was named Prócer, in a reference to The Simpsons 1997 episode "The Canine Mutiny", which features a Collie named Laddie ("Prócer" in the Latin American Spanish dub), itself a parody of another Collie dog, Lassie; the name was suggested by Fernández's child. An Instagram account for Prócer was later created as well, and as of April 2020, it had over 65,000 followers.

In June 2020, Dylan fathered a female, which was named Kaila.

== See also ==
- Conan, late pet dog owned by Fernández's successor Javier Milei
- List of individual dogs
