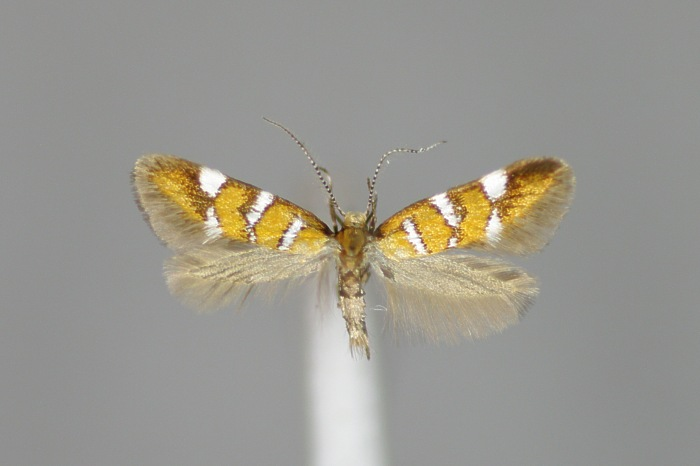
- Male

Scientific classification
- Kingdom: Animalia
- Phylum: Arthropoda
- Class: Insecta
- Order: Lepidoptera
- Family: Oecophoridae
- Genus: Fabiola
- Species: F. pokornyi

Binomial name
- Fabiola pokornyi (Nickerl, 1864)

Synonyms
- Oecophora pokornyi Nickerl, 1864

= Fabiola pokornyi =

Species of moth

Fabiola pokornyi is a moth of the family Oecophoridae. It is found in the Czech Republic, Slovakia, Albania, Bulgaria, Hungary, Romania, North Macedonia, Greece and Ukraine. It is also present in Russia and the Near East.

The wingspan is 10–11 mm. The ground colour of the forewings is golden yellow with three white band with black margins. The hindwings are grey.
