= Fabiola Yáñez =

First Lady of Argentina from 2019 to 2023

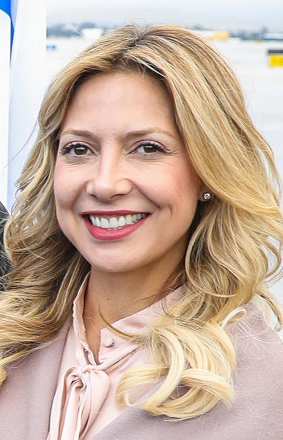
- Yáñez in 2020

First Lady of Argentina
- In role 10 December 2019 – 10 December 2023
- President: Alberto Fernández
- Preceded by: Juliana Awada
- Succeeded by: Vacant

Personal details
- Born: Fabiola Andrea Yáñez; 14 July 1981 (age 45) Villa Regina, Río Negro, Argentina
- Domestic partner: Alberto Fernández (2014–2024)
- Children: 1
- Education: University of Palermo
- Occupation: Journalist; actress

Fabiola Andrea Yáñez (born 14 July 1981) is an Argentine journalist and actress who served as the first lady of Argentina from 2019 to 2023.

== Early life and education ==
Fabiola Andrea Yáñez was born on 14 July 1981 in Villa Regina, Río Negro Province, although she grew up in Alem, Misiones Province. Through her mother, she is of Chilean descent. Her family moved to Misiones when she was a teenager, and she finished high school in Posadas.

She studied journalism at the University of Palermo, in Buenos Aires; her licenciate dissertation was on the "interdiscursive tension between Néstor Kirchner and Clarín from 2003 to 2007." She met Alberto Fernández, then Néstor and Cristina Kirchner's former chief of cabinet, while doing research for her dissertation.

== Career ==
Yáñez's media career began when she was 17, when she co-hosted a children's program in Rosario's Canal 3; she later acted in small stage productions in Rosario as well. She continued to host a number of shows in Canal 3 until 2004. She also co-hosted Estrictamente personal, a show dealing with sexuality topics on Cablevisión's Canal 6. After graduating from university, Yáñez worked for a number of domestic and international news agencies, including Infobae, Página/12, América TV, C5N, CNN+ and Spain's La Razón. In 2018 she began co-hosting Moria Casán's América TV talk show, Incorrectas, and later starred in the stage show ¡Otra vez papá! Después de los 50, alongside Manuel Wirzt.

=== First Lady of Argentina ===
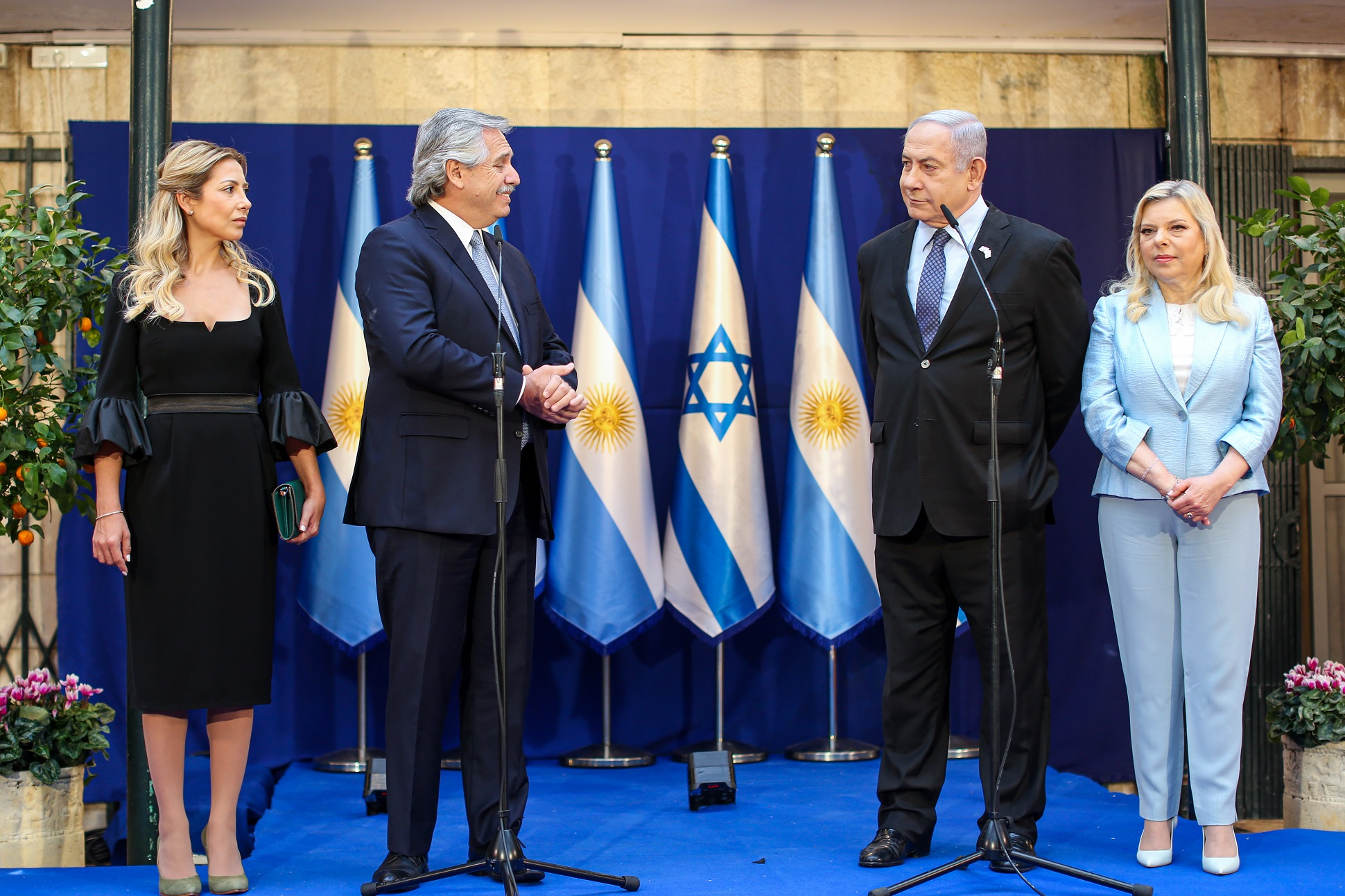
Yáñez (far left) with Fernández, Israeli prime minister Benjamin Netanyahu and his wife, Sara Netanyahu during a presidential visit to Jerusalem in January 2020.

On 10 December 2019, her partner Alberto Fernández was elected as President of Argentina. She stated that she wished to use her position as a platform for social work, especially in respect to Argentine children and families. Yáñez embraced the title of "First Lady" despite criticism from government-aligned feminist activists and intellectuals, such as Dora Barrancos.

From January to February 2020, Yáñez accompanied Fernández in his first tour as president of Argentina, starting in Jerusalem, Israel on 24 January 2020, where the presidential couple met with Israeli prime minister Benjamin Netanyahu and Sara Netanyahu, later visiting Berlin and Paris. In Paris she met with UNESCO authorities to be briefed on the organization's education, inclusivity and childhood programmes.

In March 2020, Yáñez participated alongside Chief of Cabinet Santiago Cafiero and Women's Minister Elizabeth Gómez Alcorta in the re-inauguration of the Argentine Women's Bicentennial Hall in the Casa Rosada. Later, in April 2020, Yáñez organized and hosted Unidos por Argentina, a TV event oriented toward raising funds for the Argentine Red Cross to aid in the fight against the COVID-19 pandemic; the event raised over US$500,000 during its seven-hour duration.

On 23 April 2020, Yáñez pressed charges against a La Plata-based news agency for libel, harassment and gender-based discrimination.

== Personal life ==
Yáñez was in a relationship with Alberto Fernández from 2014 to 2024. During Fernández's presidency, the couple resided in the Quinta de Olivos; prior to that, they lived in an apartment in the Puerto Madero neighbourhood of Buenos Aires. Fernández and Yáñez own four collies: Dylan, Prócer, Keila and Blue.

On 23 September 2021, the presidential office's medical unit announced Yáñez was expecting her first child. Yáñez and Fernández's son, Francisco Fernández Yáñez, was born on 11 April 2022 at Sanatorio Otamendi, in Buenos Aires. As of August 2024, both Fabiola and Francisco Yáñez reside in Spain.

In August 2024, she accused Fernández of domestic violence and harassment during their tenure as president and first lady; Fernández denied the allegations. He is currently banned by an Argentine court from leaving the country while the investigation is underway. On 14 August, Fernández was indicted on charges of domestic abuse against Yáñez.

Honorary titles
Preceded by Juliana Awada	First Lady of Argentina; 2019–2023	Vacant
