= Greta Panettieri =

Italian singer

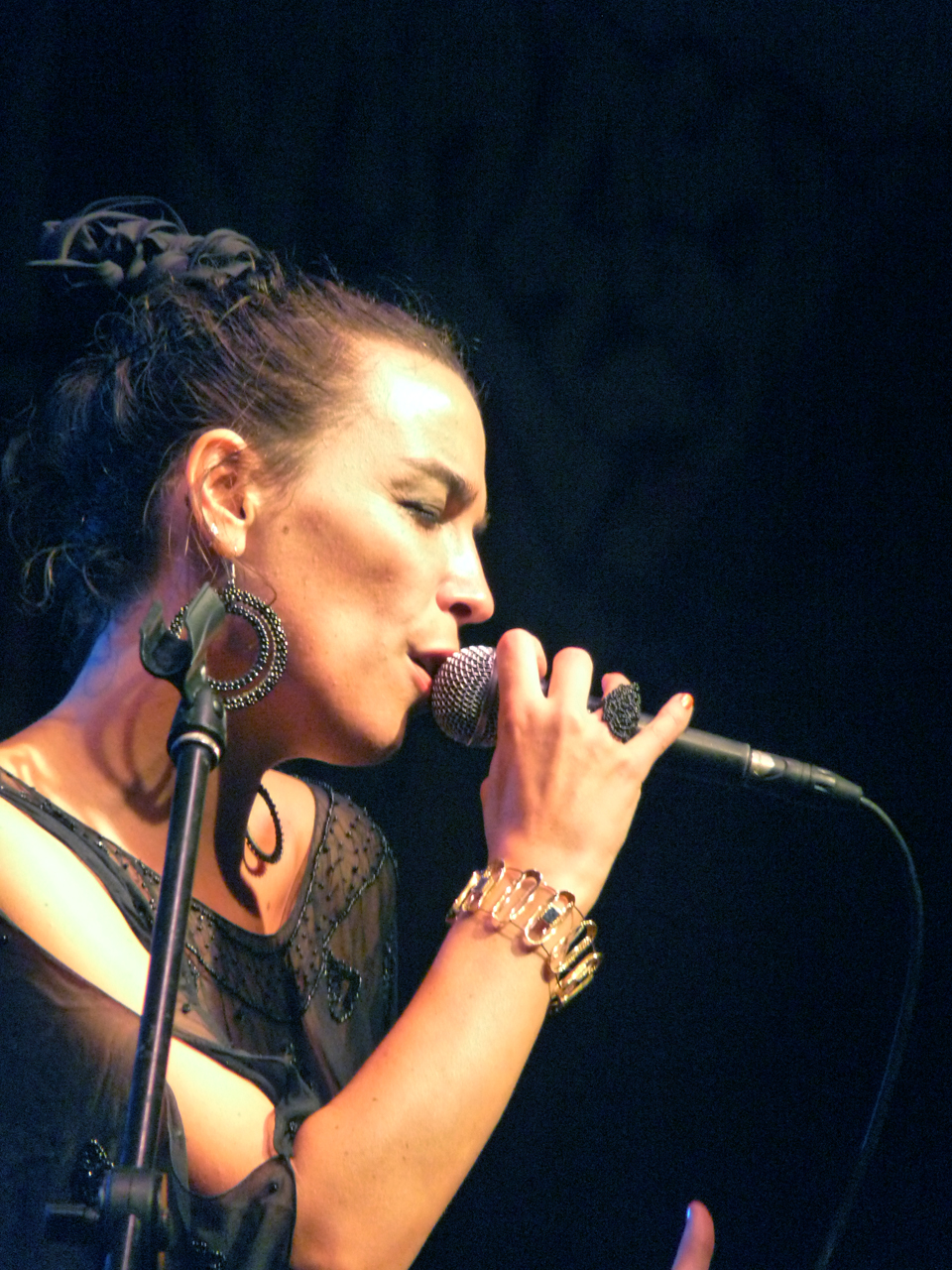
- Greta Panettieri
- Born: 7 April 1978 (age 48); Rome, Italy
- Occupations: Singer-songwriter; writer; musician
- Years active: 2000–present
- Musical career
- Genres: Jazz; Latin Jazz
- Instrument: Vocals – violin
- Labels: Decca Records; GBM
- Website: gretapanettieri.com

Greta Panettieri (7 April 1978) is an Italian singer, songwriter, writer and musician.

== Biography ==
Born in Rome and raised in Umbria, Greta Panettieri began her musical career as a six-year-old playing the violin, the instrument that she studied at Conservatory Francesco Morlacchi of Perugia for the next 10 years. She also studied piano and vocals. In 1994 Greta won a scholarship to attend the prestigious Berklee College of Music in Boston.

Instead of going to Boston on scholarship, Panettieri decided to stay in New York City after arriving from Italy. She started singing in several clubs, with different styles, from the most traditional to the most experimental, performing with jazz groups but also Latin music, Funk, R&B, Electronic music and Bossa nova. Singing different musical genres allowed her to learn both English and Portuguese. In 2004 she founded "Greta's Bakery", along with Italian pianist Andrea Sammartino, American bassist Mike La Valle.

In 2005, after showcasing for several labels, Panettieri signed with Universal Music Group. She began collaborating with composer Phil Galdston, author of songs such as The Last to Know by Céline Dion and Save the Best for Last by Vanessa L. Williams.

In 2007 she was signed by Decca Records (Universal Music Group), working with producer Stewart Lerman.

In 2009 Panettieri toured Europe as Joe Jackson's opening act.

In 2010, the album "The Edge of Everything" by Greta's Bakery was released in the US by Decca Records. The same year Greta participated in an international project as a guest vocalist and co-author of Patricia Romania's album Sou Brasileira published by Pony Canyon in Japan. This experience led Greta to collaborating with Terri Lynn Carrington, Robert Irving III, Paolinho Braga, Antônio Carlos Jobim, Toninho Horta, Nona Hendrix and many more.

As a solo artist, Greta recorded a live album at ZincBar, a New York jazz club in the heart of the West Village, with Brazilian pianist Cidinho Teixeira, bassist Itaiguara Brandao, drummer Mauricio Zottarelli, and saxophonist Rodrigo Ursaia. The album, "Brazilian Nights (Live at ZincBar)" was released in 2011 under the Greta's Bakery music label.

In 2011, Greta moved back to Italy and started performing in various clubs and festivals including a series of concerts at Umbria Jazz Winter. She began collaborating with Gegè Telesforo, including many songs on Telesforo's albums Nu Joy (Columbia Records) and Fun Slow Ride published by Ropeadope 2016. Greta has toured off and on with Telesforo ever since.

In 2013, with the supervision of Larry Williams, Greta wrote a new album with Andrea Sammartino titled Under Control. The album was released by GBM worldwide on all digital platforms at the end of 2013, and was physically released in December 2014 attached to a Graphic Novel published Viaggio in Jazz by Edizioni Corsare and inspired by Greta's life.

In 2014, Greta also released an Italian album, Non Gioco Più, that reinterprets the great successes of Mina (Italian legendary singer from the 60s) and features, among others, Fabrizio Bosso. The atmospheres of this work retain two timeless feelings: on the one hand the nocturnal, suffused and golden world of jazz; on the other, the mood of Italian songwriting between the '60s and' 70s.

In 2014, Greta sang with Sergio Cammariere on three tracks of his album entitled Mano Nella Mano (RCA Records).

In 2015, Greta was featured in 4 episodes of the Italian national RAI radio show "Radio 2 Social Club" as "la ragazza del club" next to Luca Barbarossa.

In July 2015, the single "C'est Irreparable" was released, premiering live at the BlueNote Milan on 5 July.

In 2016, TV Channel La7 hosted Greta for over 20 episodes as a musical guest on the TV show L'aria che tira conducted by Myrta Merlino. The same year, she co-wrote the single Let The Children with Gegè Telesforo and Ben Sidran that eventually became the UNICEF testimonial song.

In October 2016 Greta released the album "Shattered/Sgretolata". Recorded between Rome and NYC, the album features many guests: Claudio "Greg" Gregori, drummer Mauricio Zottarelli and bassist Itaiguara Brandao from New York City and jazz guitarist Francesco Diodati. NYC visual artist Jennie Booth wrote the lyrics for the single I'm in Love.

In 2017 and 2018 Greta toured Russia, China and Europe, with the Shattered/Sgretolata Tour. She was also featured as a special guest vocalist on Brazilian guitarist and songwriter Toquinho spring and summer Italian Tour.

== Discography ==
- 2010 The Edge of Everything (Greta's Bakery) Decca/UMG
- 2011 Brazilian Nights – GBM
- 2013 Under Control (Greta's Bakery) – GBM
- 2014 Non gioco più – GBM
- 2015 C'est irréparable (Greta Panettieri) – GBM
- 2016 Shattered/Sgretolata – GBM

== Collaborations and compilations ==
- 2006 Newsjoint "Bossa & Co" – Twilightmusic
- 2010 Patricia Romania "Sou Brazileira" – Pony Canyon
- 2012 Gegè Telesforo "Nu Joy" Columbia Sony
- 2013 Piero Masciarelli "Be Bop Dance" Irma Records
- 2014 Sergio Cammariere "Mano nella mano"
- 2016 Gegè Telesforo "Fun Slow Ride" Groove Master

== Books ==
- 2014 Viaggio in Jazz Edizioni Corsare

== Bibliography ==
- Greta Panettieri, Viaggio in jazz, Edizioni Corsare, 2014
