= Fabiola lucidella =

Scientific classification
- Kingdom: Animalia
- Phylum: Arthropoda
- Clade: Pancrustacea
- Class: Insecta
- Order: Lepidoptera
- Family: Oecophoridae
- Genus: Fabiola
- Species: F. lucidella

Binomial name
- Fabiola lucidella (Busck, 1912)

Synonyms
- Epicallima lucidella Busck, 1912

Species of concealer moth in subfamily Oecophorinae

Fabiola lucidella is a species of concealer moth in the subfamily Oecophorinae. It was described by August Busck in 1912 as Epicallima lucidella.

Fabiola lucidella occurs in Pennsylvania and Arkansas in the United States and has Hodges/MONA number 1052. Its type locality is Oak Station, Allegheny Co. in Pennsylvania.
