= Fabiola quinqueferella =

Scientific classification
- Kingdom: Animalia
- Phylum: Arthropoda
- Class: Insecta
- Order: Lepidoptera
- Family: Oecophoridae
- Genus: Fabiola
- Species: F. quinqueferella

Binomial name
- Fabiola quinqueferella (Walsingham, 1881)

Synonyms
- Glyphipterix quinqueferella Walsingham, 1881

Species of moth

Fabiola quinqueferella is a species of Oecophoridae moth in the genus Fabiola. It was described by Walsingham in 1881. It is found in California.
