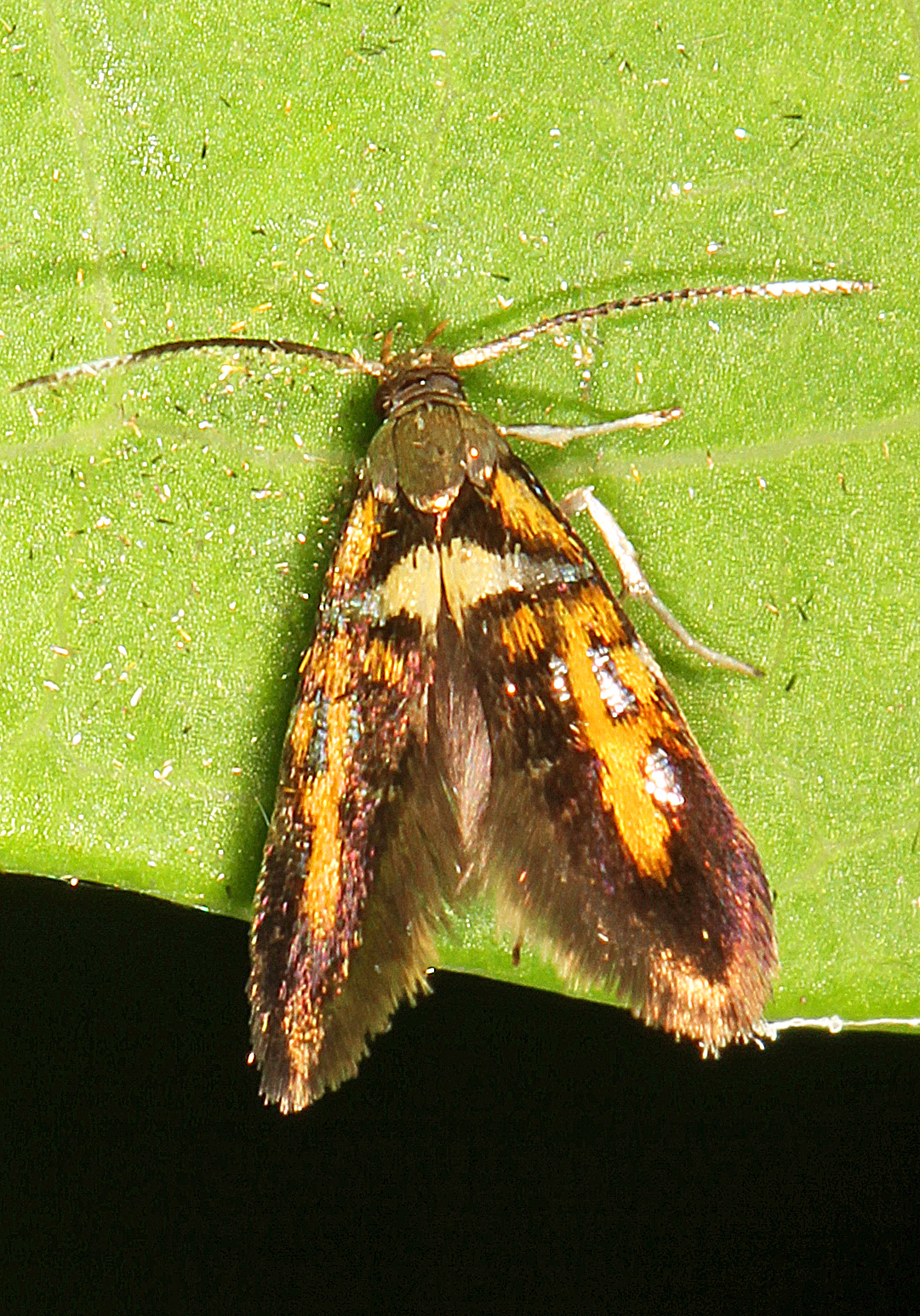

Scientific classification
- Kingdom: Animalia
- Phylum: Arthropoda
- Clade: Pancrustacea
- Class: Insecta
- Order: Lepidoptera
- Family: Oecophoridae
- Genus: Fabiola
- Species: F. edithella

Binomial name
- Fabiola edithella (Busck, 1907)

= Fabiola edithella =

Species of moth

Fabiola edithella, or Edith's fabiola moth, is a species of concealer moth in the family Oecophoridae.
