= Fabiana Masili =

Brazilian singer and songwriter

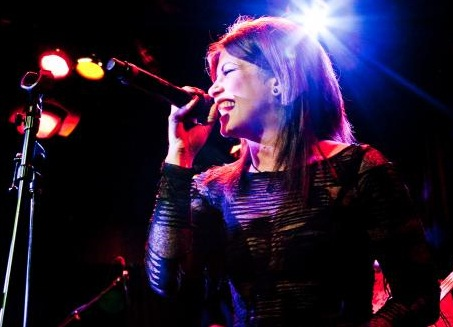

Background information
- Also known as: La Bella
- Born: Fabiana Masili; 22 May 1978 (age 48); Rio Claro, Brazil
- Origin: Brazil
- Genres: Brazilian funk, jazz
- Occupations: Singer & songwriter
- Years active: 1992–present

Fabiana Masili (Rio Claro, 22 May 1978) is a Brazilian singer and songwriter. Musical from her earliest years, she started playing the organ at the age of 8 and began working professionally and singing in bands at 15.

Fabiana Masili studied at the prestigious State University of Campinas – UNICAMP, in Brazil, earning her bachelor's degree in Popular Music while singing in several bands and producing at a Brazilian recording studio, Fabrica do Som.

Afterwards she started a meteoric international career singing in São Miguel Island (Portugal), in Berkeley (United States) and, finally, in New York City (United States). Throughout her career, Fabiana Masili has also participated in several Album recordings.

== Awards ==
Masili's singing has earned her prominent awards in Brazil such as "Best Jingle (2000)" and "Best Soundtrack for TV (2001) with Cicero Fornari, Gustavo Souza and Eric dos Santos".

== International career ==
Fabiana started her international career in 2000, after spending 6 months singing in São Miguel Island, the largest and most populous island in the Portuguese archipelago of the Azores.

In 2001 she moved to the United States to study at the Jazzschool in Berkeley, CA. Her road to bigger fame came in around 2003, when she moved to New York City. After that, she has worked with names such as Claudio Roditi, Cidinho Teixeira, Dom Salvador, Frank Martin, Ledisi, Slide Hampton, Jeremy Pelt, Davi Vieira, Sandro Albert, Nation Beat, Dario Boente, Itaiguara Brandão, Mauricio Zottarelli, Scott Kettner.

She performed regularly at Lincoln Center Outdoors, Dizzy's Coca-Cola, Rockwood MusicHall, Summerstage, The Zinc Bar, Cafe Wha?, Drom, Joe's Pub, Nublu and S.O.B.'s.

== Present ==
"Rastros" (2014)
Fabiana Masili singing the chorus of "Rastro", from the album Face Forward, Jeremy by Jeremy Pelt.

"Simplify" (2013)
Fabiana Masili singing the chorus of "Simplify", from the album Love Science Music by Josh Giunta.

"Game Over" (2010)
Fabiana Masili singing the chorus of "Game Over", from the album Sambatronic by Dário Boente & Huge in Japan.

"Vai Tristeza" (2008)
Fabiana Masili singing the chorus of "Vai Tristeza", from the album CD Bahia 2 Harlem, vol1 by Duke Mushroom.

She is currently working on her first album featuring Davi Viera and her band Jabacule. It will comprise many Brazilian funk numbers and her expertise in Brazilian Jazz numbers. Masili is at her peak form with regular appearances for the Brazooka at the world-famous, "Café Wha?" the Zinc Bar and S.O.B.'s.

She also performed at the Brazil Premiere 2009 at the Museum of Modern Art, New York, with Davi Vieira.

On 3 May 2013 was released the Love Science Music Album, by Josh Giunta, which counts with the participation of Fabiana Masili on the vocals.

== Selected discography ==
2003 "Nunca Desista" – Cicero Fornari – Bebê com Lobo

2008 "Vai Tristeza" – Duke Mushroom – Bahia 2 Harlem, vol1

2010 "Game Over" – Dário Boente & Huge in Japan – Sambatronic

2010 "Sorte" – Dário Boente & Huge in Japan – Sambatronic

2010 "My life has Value" – Dário Boente & Huge in Japan – Sambatronic

2010 "Bahia" – Dário Boente & Huge in Japan – Sambatronic

2013 "Simplify" – Josh Giunta – Love Science Music

2014 "Rastros" – Jeremy Pelt – Face Forward, Jeremy
