= Fabíola Mansur =

Brazilian politician

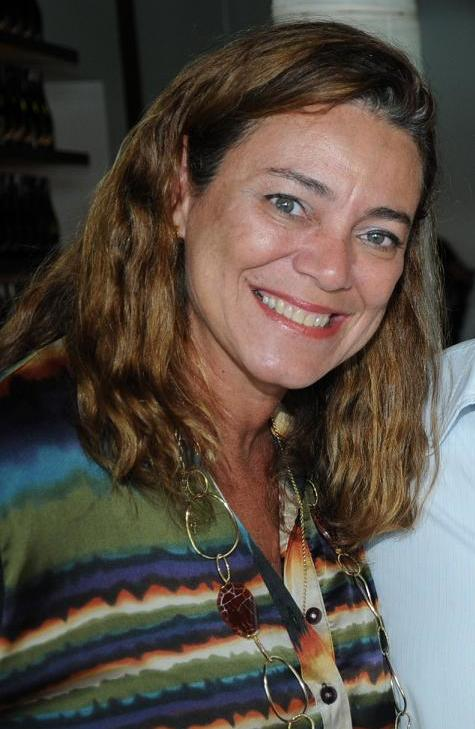

Federal deputy
- In office February 1, 2015 – February 1, 2023
- Incumbent
- Assumed office February 10, 2023 (2 consecutive terms)

Councilwoman of Salvador
- In office February 1, 2013 – January 31, 2015

Personal details
- Born: September 22, 1962 (age 64) Rio de Janeiro, Brazil
- Party: PSB (2007–2026); PV (2026–present)
- Education: Federal University of Bahia
- Occupation: Physician, politician

Fabiola Mansur de Carvalho (Rio de Janeiro, October 22, 1962), better known as Fabíola Mansur, is a Brazilian physician and politician affiliated with the Green Party (PV). For years she served as a state deputy for the state of Bahia. She was elected councilwoman in the municipality of Salvador in 2012, but resigned from her mandate to assume a seat in the Legislative Assembly of Bahia (ALBA).

She was the first openly lesbian woman to hold a seat in both the Municipal Chamber of Salvador and the Legislative Assembly of Bahia. In defending public policies for the LGBTQ community, she authored the law that created the first municipal reference center for serving people from this community, the Salvador Municipal LGBT Reference Center, created in 2016.

She holds a degree in Medicine from the Federal University of Bahia (UFBA), specialized in ophthalmology at the Hospital das Clínicas, and completed postgraduate studies at the University of Miami.
