= Fabiola Valentín and Mariana Varela =

Puerto Rican couple and beauty contest winners

Mariana Varela
- Born: Mariana Jessica Varela; August 26, 1996 (age 29); Buenos Aires, Argentina
- Occupations: Model, actress
- Known for: being Miss Universe Argentina 2019 and Miss Grand Argentina 2020
- Spouse: Fabiola Valentín (m. 2022)

Fabiola Valentín
- Born: Fabiola Krystal Valentín González; September 9, 1999 (age 26); Camuy, Puerto Rico
- Occupation: Model
- Known for: being Miss Universe Puerto Rico 2019 and Miss Grand Puerto Rico 2020
- Spouse: Mariana Varela (m. 2022)

Mariana Jessica Varela and Fabiola Krystal Valentín González are an Argentine and Puerto Rican female married couple who have both won beauty contests in 2019 and 2020, respectively.

== Mariana Varela ==
Mariana Jessica Varela (born August 26, 1996) is a model, Actor and winner of the Miss Universe Argentina 2019 beauty pageant, which led her to represent Argentina in Miss Universe 2019. She was also the Argentine representative in the Miss Grand International 2020 competition, where she reached the Top 10 semi-finalists.

=== Miss Universe Argentina 2019 ===
Varela participated in the beauty contest, where she won the title. It was crowned by its national director, Osmel Souza.

=== Miss Universe 2019 ===
Varela competed in the Miss Universe 2019 pageant and emerged as one of the favorite contestants. However, she failed to win the beauty pageant.

=== Miss Grand International 2020 ===
Varela relinquished her title of Miss Universe Argentina 2019 by earning the title of Miss Grand Argentina 2020. She represented her country in the competition held in Bangkok. Varela managed to enter the quota in her country because the previous year she did not compete, Varela was among the top ten along with representatives of Puerto Rico (Fabiola Valentín), Malaysia (Jasebel Shalani), Czech Republic (Denisa Spergerova) and Thailand (Chantarapadit Namfon).

== Fabiola Valentín ==
Fabiola Krystal Valentín González (born September 9, 1999) is known for working as a model for different popular brands and magazine covers. She has represented her country Puerto Rico, on the stage of Miss Universe Puerto Rico 2019, where she won the title of Miss Grand Puerto Rico 2020, which led her to represent Puerto Rico in the Miss Grand International 2020 pageant in Thailand.

=== Miss Universe Puerto Rico 2019 ===
Valentín participated representing Camuy in the Miss Universe Puerto Rico 2019 pageant, occupying the second place, with Madison Anderson as the winner.

=== Miss Grand Puerto Rico 2020 ===
Fabiola was designated Miss Grand Puerto Rico 2020, as due to the COVID-19 pandemic the pageant could not be held.

=== Miss Grand International 2020 ===
She represented Puerto Rico at the Miss Grand International 2020 pageant in Bangkok, Thailand, on March 27, 2021, where she qualified for the top 10 Miss Grand International 2020 alongside representatives from Argentina (Mariana Varela), Malaysia (Jasebel Shalani), Czech Republic (Denisa Spergerova) and Thailand (Chantarapadit Namfon). In the end, the representative of the United States was victorious.

== Personal lives ==
In 2022 Valentín and Varela announced their marriage in San Juan de Puerto Rico, two years after competing in the Miss Grand International 2020 against each other.
