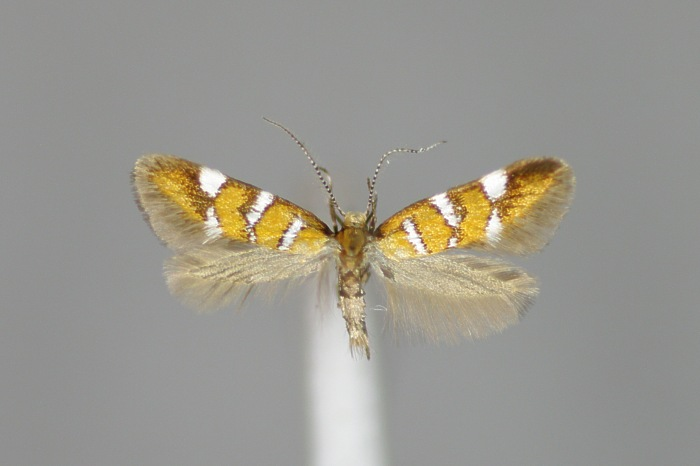
- Fabiola pokornyi

Scientific classification
- Kingdom: Animalia
- Phylum: Arthropoda
- Clade: Pancrustacea
- Class: Insecta
- Order: Lepidoptera
- Family: Oecophoridae
- Tribe: Oecophorini
- Genus: Fabiola; Busck, 1908

= Fabiola (moth) =

Genus of moths

Fabiola is a genus of the concealer moth family (Oecophoridae). Among these, it belongs to subfamily Oecophorinae.

== Species ==
- Fabiola edithella (Busck, 1907)
- Fabiola lucidella (Busck, 1912)
- Fabiola pokornyi (Nickerl, 1864)
- Fabiola quinqueferella (Walsingham, 1881)
- Fabiola shaleriella (Chambers, 1875)
- Fabiola tecta Braun, 1935
