= Fabyula Badawi =

Egyptian poet and journalist (born 1960)

- Born: 1960 (age 65–66); Cairo
- Citizenship: Egypt
- Education: Bachelors degree, business administration and accounting
- Occupations: Journalist, poet
- Employer: al-Madina

Fabyula Badawi (born 1960) is an Egyptian poet and journalist.

== Biography ==
Born in Cairo, Badawi received a bachelor's degree in business administration and a graduate degree in accounting. As of 2008 she was employed by the Saudi newspaper al-Madina as a journalist. Three volumes of her poetry have been published. They are Mahlan ayyuha-l-rajul (Take it Easy, Man, 1989); Qasa'id zami'a (Thirsty Poems, 1990); and al-Washm) (The Tattoo, 1992).
