= Itaiguara Brandão =

Brazilian guitarist

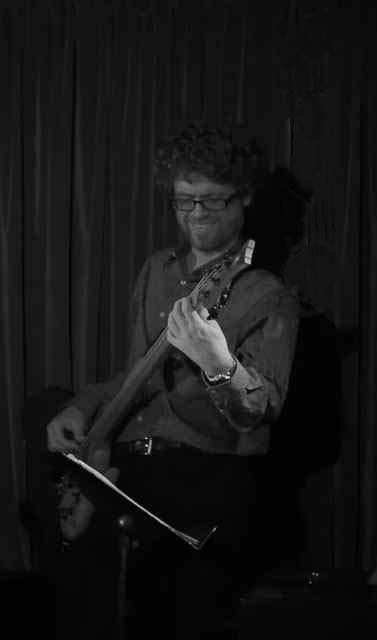
Itaiguara Brandão playing electric bass in New York City.

Itaiguara Mariano Brandão (born October 31, 1968) is a New York City-based recording artist and bassist. A native of Rio de Janeiro, Brazil, Brandão has toured internationally and recorded extensively with a wide range of Latin and World Music artists such as: Dianne Reeves, Ivan Lins, Marcos Valle, Toquinho, Carlos Lyra, Roberto Menescal, Leny Andrade, Joyce (singer), Paulo Braga, Randy Brecker, Dom Salvador, Paquito D'Rivera, Claudio Roditi, Robin Eubanks, Jovino Santos-Neto, Emílio Santiago, Elba Ramalho, Guilherme Arantes, Romero Lubambo, Léo Gandelman among many others. He has recorded on major labels and played on the 22nd Annual Latin Grammy Awards winning album Ancestras by Petrona Martinez. Brandão has been one of the most sought-after Brazilian bassists in the Northeast and freelance musicians in the United States, having completed nearly 7,500 performances in the past 30 years.

== Life and work ==
A product of musical influences as diverse as traditional samba, progressive rock (Yes, Rush), flamenco (Paco de Lucía) jazz (John Coltrane, Branford Marsalis, Herbie Hancock) and pop, Brandão's upbringing was steeped in a rich musical fabric. He began studying piano and music theory at the age of 7 and by age 13 he was playing classical, chorinho and other Brazilian styles on classical guitar and electric bass. He made his professional debut performance in Rio at the age of 15.

Itaiguara Brandão attended Berklee College of Music in Boston, MA and studied jazz improvisation with the legendary Charlie Banacos and arranging with Mike Longo (Dizzy Gillespie's music director for 9 years). He was awarded a Berklee Achievement Scholarship for musical excellence in 1995 and graduated summa cum laude in 1997. Brandão also holds a degree in Telecommunications Engineering from Pontifícia Universidade Católica (PUC) in Rio de Janeiro, Brazil (1991).

Itaiguara has played on major venues such as the Nobel Peace Prize concert in Oslo, the Grand Hall of the Moscow Conservatory with the Moscow Symphony Orchestra, the Teatro Real in Madrid, and the Sydney Opera House in Australia. Brandão is a contributor to the educational book/CD "Inside the Brazilian Rhythm Section," by Nelson Faria/Cliff Korman - a guide for bassists, guitarists, pianists and drummers on the eight most dominant styles of Brazilian music: samba, bossa nova, partido alto, choro, baiao, frevo, marcha-rancho and afoxé. (Publisher: Sher Music, 2005)

Itaiguara has a master's degree in jazz composition from Aaron Copland School of Music (Queens College, New York) and received the Marvin Hamlisch Award in 2019.

Itaiguara Brandão served as musical director for the Paulo Braga Band from 1999 to 2003. The creator, Paulo Braga, is known as the father of Brazilian drums. Braga played with Antonio Carlos Jobim for fifteen years and is currently part of The Jobim Trio.

Brandão was awarded a permanent resident visa issued by the US government to foreign artists with extraordinary abilities. The name Itaiguara [ee-tahy-gwahr-uh] has its roots in an indigenous dialect of Brazil and roughly translates to "water that flows from the stone."

== Selected discography ==
1996 Bambule - Mas Que La Fuerza

1997 Sublimes - Sublimes

1998 AnaLu - Guerreira

2000 Vera Mara and Paul Meyers - Brasil & Company

2001 Nelson Faria and Cliff Korman - Inside The Brazilian Rhythm Section

2002 Suzy Schwartz - Vento

2003 Helio Alves and Cadence Trio - Yatrata

2004 Cidinho Teixeira and Friends - Live At Zinc Bar

2006 Susan Pereira and Sabor Brasil - Tudo Azul

2006 Florian Poser's Brazilian Experience - Live In Berlin

2007 Vera Mara/Cidinho Teixeira - Luz Maior

2007 Vanderlei Pereira - Live At Zinc Bar

2008 Portinho Trio - Vinho Do Porto

2008 Gina and The Hahas - You Are The Lady

2009 Yoham Ortiz - Yoham Ortiz Concept

2009 Be - Mistura Natural

2009 Yuko Ito - Mania de Voce

2009 Mauricio Zottarelli - 7 Lives

2010 Oriente Lopez - Aguas Profundas

2010 Dom Salvador - The Art Of Samba Jazz

2011 Eliano Braz - Eliano Braz and Rabeca do Forro

2011 Greta Panettieri - Brazilian Nights (Live at ZincBar)

2014 Antonio Adolfo - Copa Village

2015 Itaiguara - Awakening

2016 Oriente Lopez - Abracadabra

2017 Matt King - Monk in Brazil

2021 Romero Lubambo and Rafael Piccolotto Chamber Orchestra - Live at Dizzy's

2021 Petrona Martinez - Ancestras
