= Fabiana (name) =

Fabiana is a feminine given name of Latin origin meaning "bean grower". It is a feminine version of the name Fabian.

Notable people named Fabiana include:

- Fabiana Barreda (born 1967), Argentine artist
- Fabiana Beltrame (born 1982), Brazilian rower
- Fabiana Bravo (born 1969), Argentine operatic soprano
- Fabiana Bytyqi (born 1995), Czech professional boxer
- Fabiana Cantilo (born 1959), Argentine singer–songwriter
- Fabiana Claudino (born 1985), Brazilian volleyball player
- Fabiana Diniz (born 1981), Brazilian team handball player
- Fabiana García Lago (born 1974), Argentine actress
- Fabiana López (born 1966), Mexican fencer
- Fabiana Luperini (born 1974), Italian cyclist
- Fabiana Masili (born 1978), Brazilian musician
- Fabiana Murer (born 1981), Brazilian pole vaulter
- Fabiana de Oliveira (born 1980), Brazilian volleyball player
- Fabiana Palladino (born 1987), English musician
- Fabiana Ríos (born 1964), Argentine politician
- Fabiana Semprebom (born 1984), Brazilian fashion model
- Fabiana Sgroi (born 1981), Italian sprint canoer
- Fabiana da Silva Simões (born 1989), Brazilian footballer
- Fabiana Udenio (born 1964), Argentine/Italian actress
- Fabiana Vallejos (born 1985), Argentine footballer
