= Quinta de Olivos =

Official residence of the President of Argentina in Buenos Aires

Quinta presidencial de Olivos
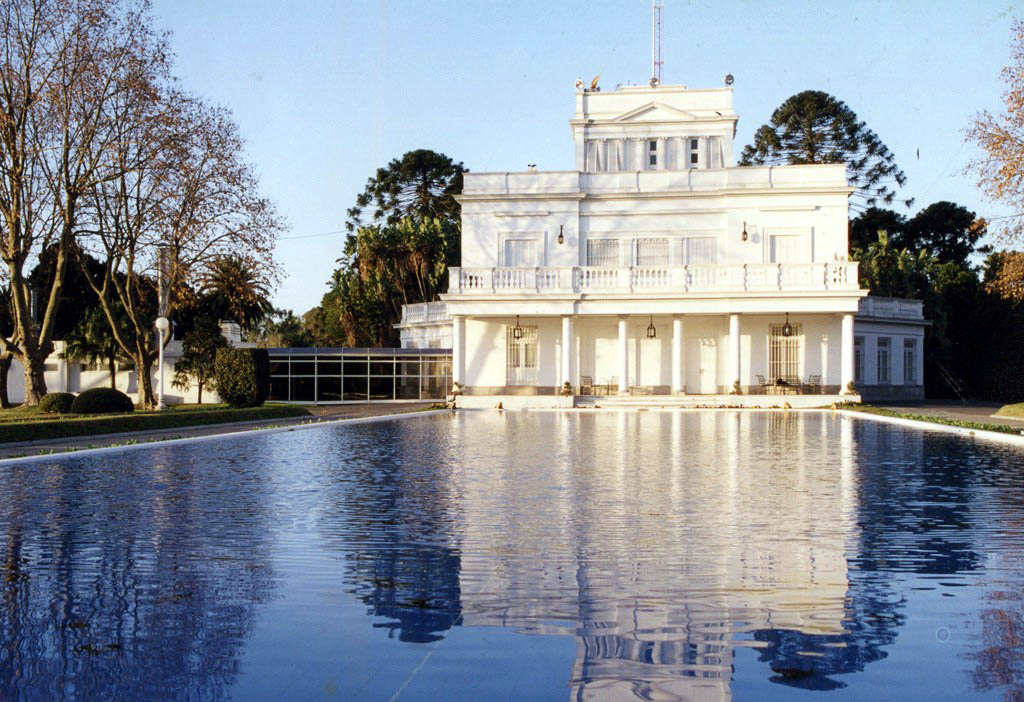
- The main building (Presidential residence) c. 1990

- Location within Greater Buenos Aires

General information
- Architectural style: Eclecticism (Neogothic and Baroque)
- Location: Olivos, Buenos Aires, Argentina
- Coordinates: 34°30′54″S 58°28′59″W
- Construction started: 1854
- Client: Miguel de Azcuénaga

Technical details
- Size: 32 hectares (79 acres) (estate)

Design and construction
- Architect: Prilidiano Pueyrredón

National Historic Monument of Argentina

The Quinta presidencial de Olivos, also known as Quinta de Olivos, is an architectural landmark in the north side Buenos Aires suburb of Olivos and the official residence of the president of Argentina. It is one of the president's official residences.

== Overview ==
=== Development ===
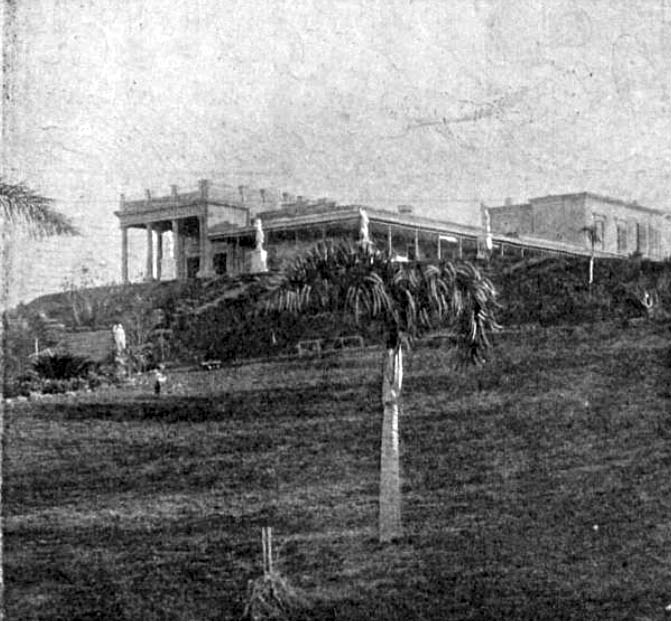
The house in 1898

Shortly after the second foundation of Buenos Aires by Captain Juan de Garay in 1580 (the first one was in 1536 by Pedro de Mendoza), among the first 400 land lots apportioned was that of a 180-hectare (440-acre) parcel 20 kilometers (12 miles) north of the city. The land, situated on a bluff overlooking the Río de la Plata, was awarded to Rodrigo de Ibarola, a lieutenant of Garay's.

A prime section of the property was purchased in 1774 by Manuel de Basavilbaso, the postmaster general of the Viceroyalty of the Río de la Plata. His daughter, Justa Rufina, married Miguel de Azcuénaga, a military officer who would later take part in the May Revolution of 1810 (prologue to the Argentine War of Independence). He also established one of the area's first apiaries on the grounds.

Azcuénaga inherited the land on the death of his wife in 1829, and their son, Miguel José, in turn inherited it in 1833. He converted the property into an equestrian estate, though the rise of Buenos Aires Province Governor and strongman Juan Manuel de Rosas led to his exile in Chile for a number of years. Azcuénaga ultimately returned and, in 1851, commissioned a graduate of the École Polytechnique, Prilidiano Pueyrredón, to design a manor house.

Pueyrredón created an eclectic design centered on Neogothic and Baroque architecture, and upon its completion in 1854, Azcuénaga came to refer to the mansion as his "birdcage"; Pueyrredón was also a renowned painter, and created a portrait of his friend and client shortly after the mansion's completion.

Azcuénaga landscaped the sprawling property with a selection of palm trees, among them Butia, Phoenix canariensis, and Chamaerops humilis. He also had vast extensions planted with Araucaria bidwillii, cedars, cryptomerias, cypresses, tipas and pines planted, as well as a row of plane trees (which graced his favorite path).

Azcuénaga, who had no legitimate offspring, bequeathed the property to his nephew, Antonio Justo Olaguer Feliú. The blind Olaguer, who had no use for the view of the waterfront, sold the easternmost portion of the land before his death in 1903 and bequeathed it to his nephew, Carlos Villate Olaguer. Villate stipulated on his receiving the property that, upon his death, it should be deeded to the Argentine Government for the purpose of its use as the Official Summer Residence of the President of Argentina.

=== Bequeathal to State ===
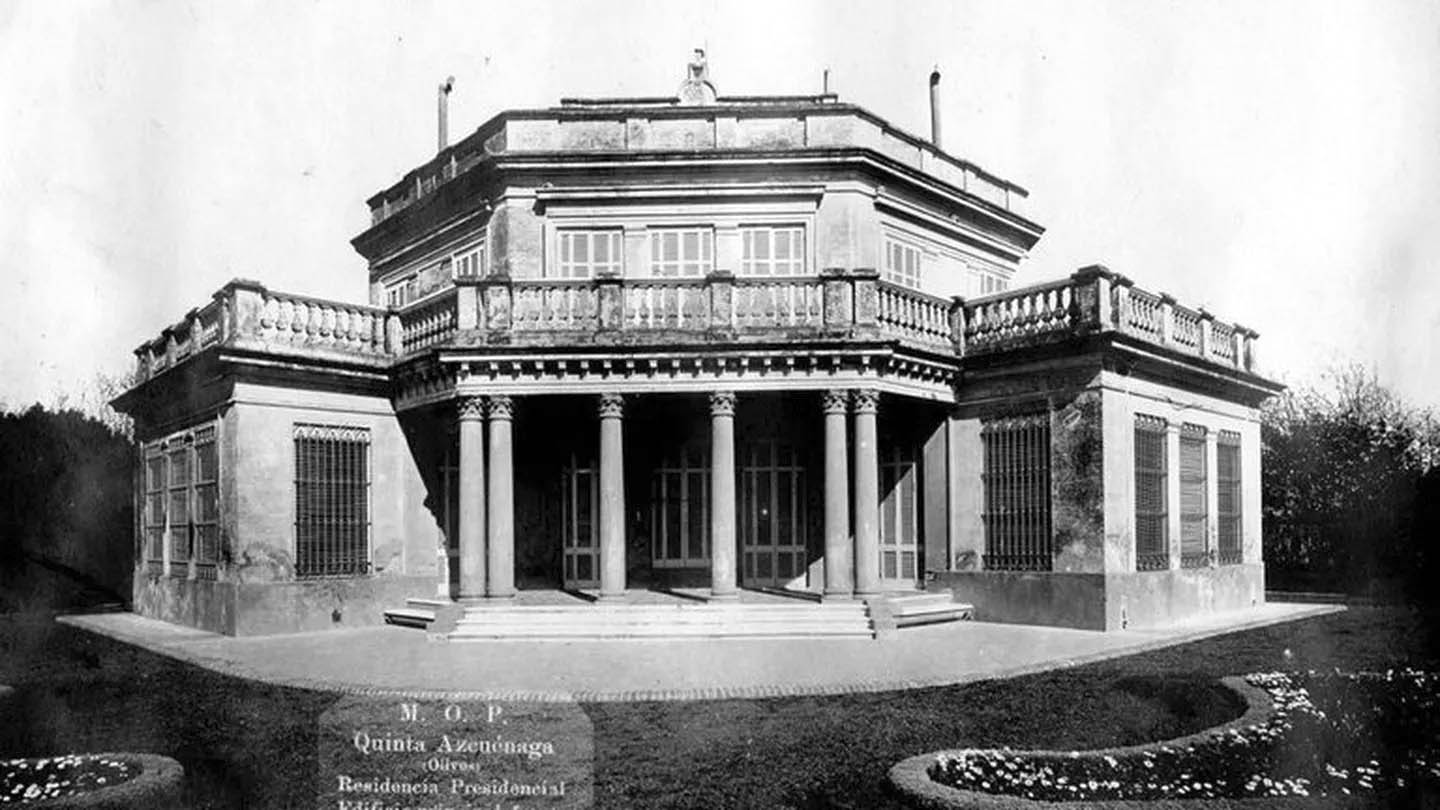
The main building (Presidential residence) as seen in 1922

Villate's death in 1913 made the 35-hectare (86-acre) property available to the government, though its conversion into a public park was considered for a number of years (it had been customary for Argentine Presidents to reside in their own home). President Hipólito Yrigoyen ultimately accepted the deed on September 30, 1918, though he designated it as the Residence of the Minister of Foreign Relations, rather than putting it to presidential use, and its first official occupant was Foreign Minister Honorio Pueyrredón. A coup in 1930 and the installation of General José Félix Uriburu gave the estate its first use as a presidential residence when the infirm dictator opted for the spot's breeze and tranquility during a 1931 heat wave.

Uriburu's successor, Agustín P. Justo, planned a vacation resort at the site in 1933. The Villate deed prevented him legally from doing so, though, and in 1936, he formally inaugurated the estate as the Residence of the President of Argentina, while ceding the western portion to the Military Officers' Association. President Justo also initiated beautification projects for the surrounding area, having an extensive row of jacaranda trees planted along the Avenida del Libertador; among his first guests at the residence, U.S. President Franklin Roosevelt, remarked during his drive at seeing the falling blooms that "it's raining blue!"

=== Presidential Residence ===
The estate's use as a year-round residence triggered a lawsuit in 1940 by Villate's heirs, alleging that it violated the terms of the will. The suit was struck down by the Argentine Supreme Court, however. Its relatively distant location from the downtown Buenos Aires presidential offices at the Casa Rosada made it of only occasional use in subsequent years. President Juan Perón installed a screening room, and had the grounds embellished with an amphitheatre, tennis courts, reflecting pool, greenhouse, Ceiba speciosa trees, and other additions, though he later attracted controversy following the 1952 death of his wife, Evita, when he also converted former polo horse stables on the grounds into installations for the "Union of Secondary School Students" (UES) - a group of athletic, adolescent girls - to which the widower provided discreet access via a tunnel built in 1953.

The scandal helped precipitate Perón's overthrow in 1955, and General Pedro Aramburu became the first president to reside habitually at the Quinta de Olivos. The quinta became the site of secret negotiations in 1961, between President Arturo Frondizi and the Argentine-born Cuban revolutionary and economy minister, Che Guevara - an attempt by Frondizi to mediate the US-Cuba conflict that, once discovered, helped result in his own overthrow in 1962. The site of frequent asados and other social gatherings, a concert organized by President Juan Carlos Onganía in 1969 led to a fire that caused the historic residence extensive damage, though it retained most of its original structure.

The quinta was the site of Juan Perón's death on July 1, 1974. Perón, who had returned from exile following elections in 1973, took office with his politically neophyte wife, Isabel, as vice president; during her tenure as president, Juan and Evita Perón's coffins both lay in state at the mansion, (the March 1976 coup resulted in their interment in Chacarita and Recoleta cemeteries, respectively).

The compound's opulence prompted a number of Argentine presidents over the years to forgo residing there, notably Dr. Héctor Cámpora, General Leopoldo Galtieri (who preferred officers' quarters at the Campo de Mayo Army Base), and Eduardo Duhalde (who took office during a historic crisis in 2002).

Later additions include a heliport (1969), a chapel (1972), and a miniature golf course installed by President Carlos Menem in 1991. The residence hosted the Olivos Pact, a political agreement signed on November 14, 1993, between Menem and former President Raúl Alfonsín (head of the main opposition party, the centrist Radical Civic Union). The pact secured support for the 1994 reform of the Argentine Constitution, which provided for the president's right to seek re-election, as well as for the popular election of the mayor of Buenos Aires, hitherto a presidentially-appointed post.

== Gallery ==
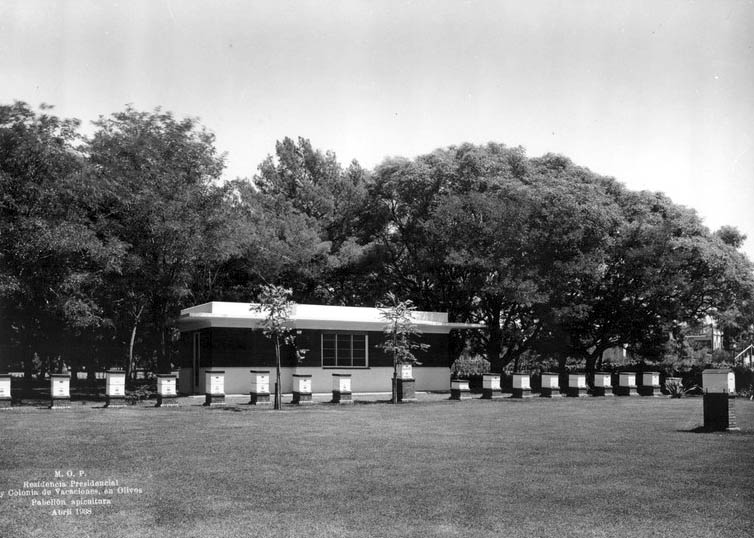
Beekeeping

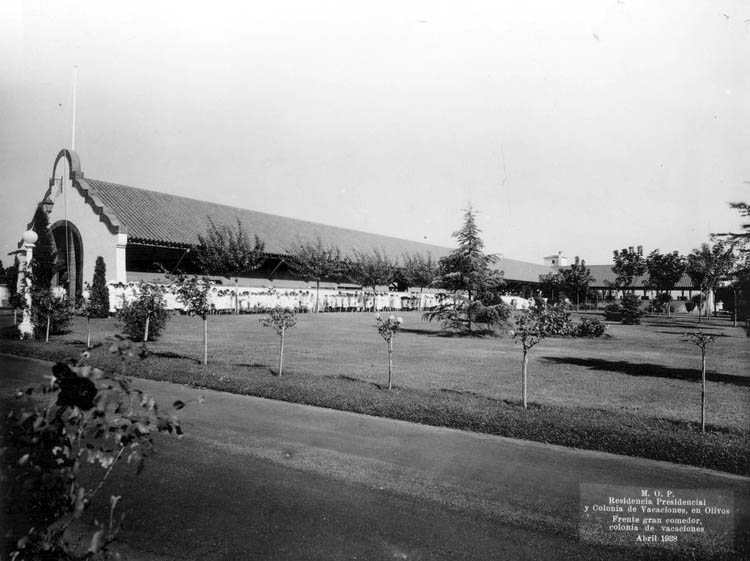
Dining rooms

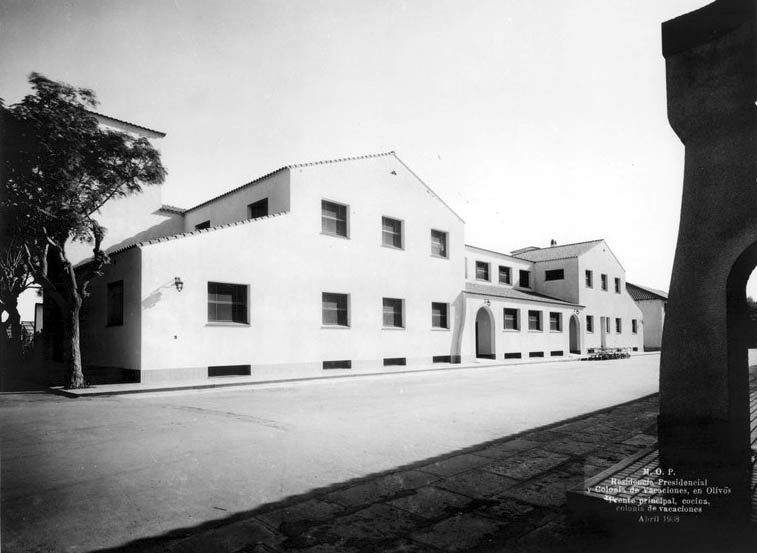
Children's building

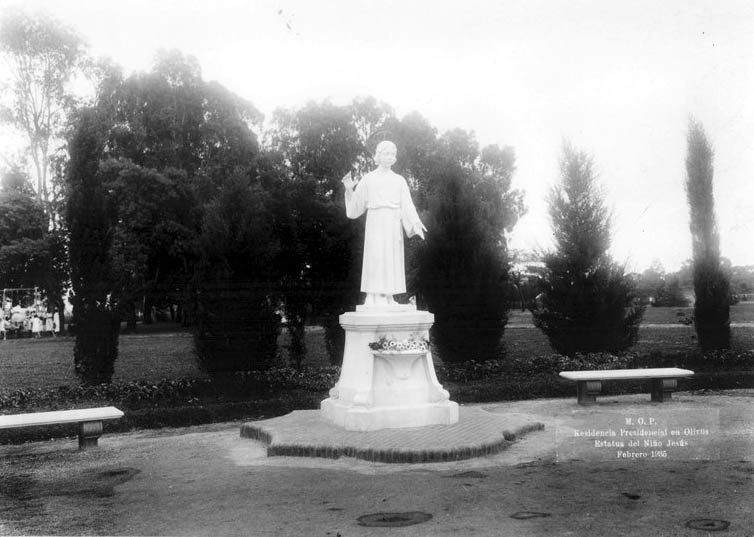
Garden and statues

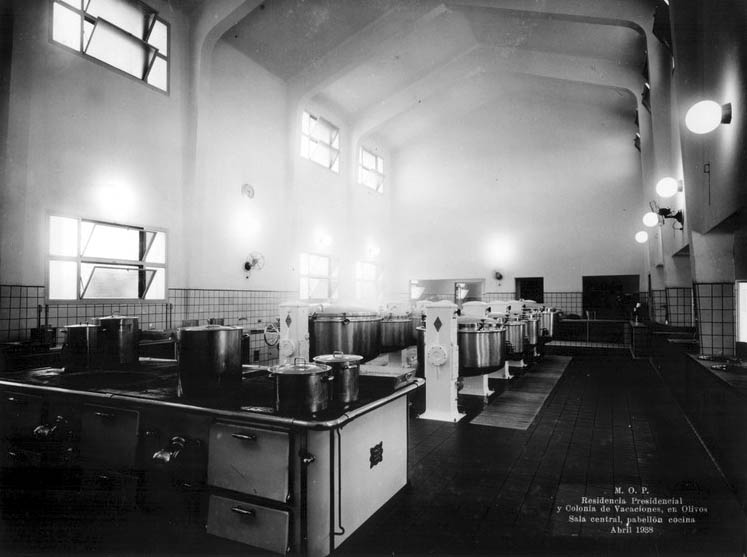
Kitchen pavilion

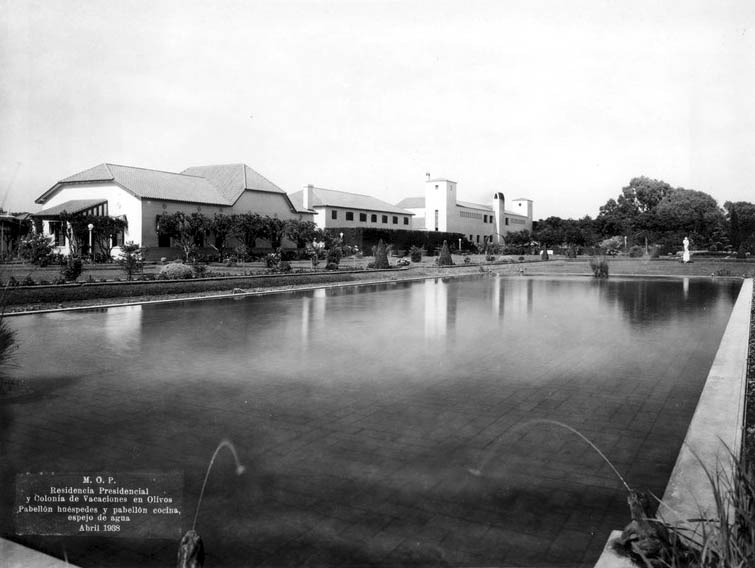
Guests' pavilion

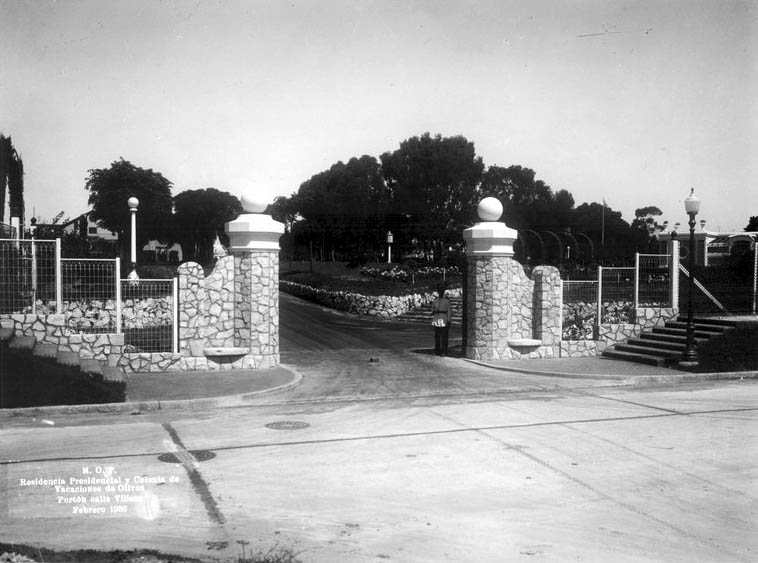
Entrance on Villate street

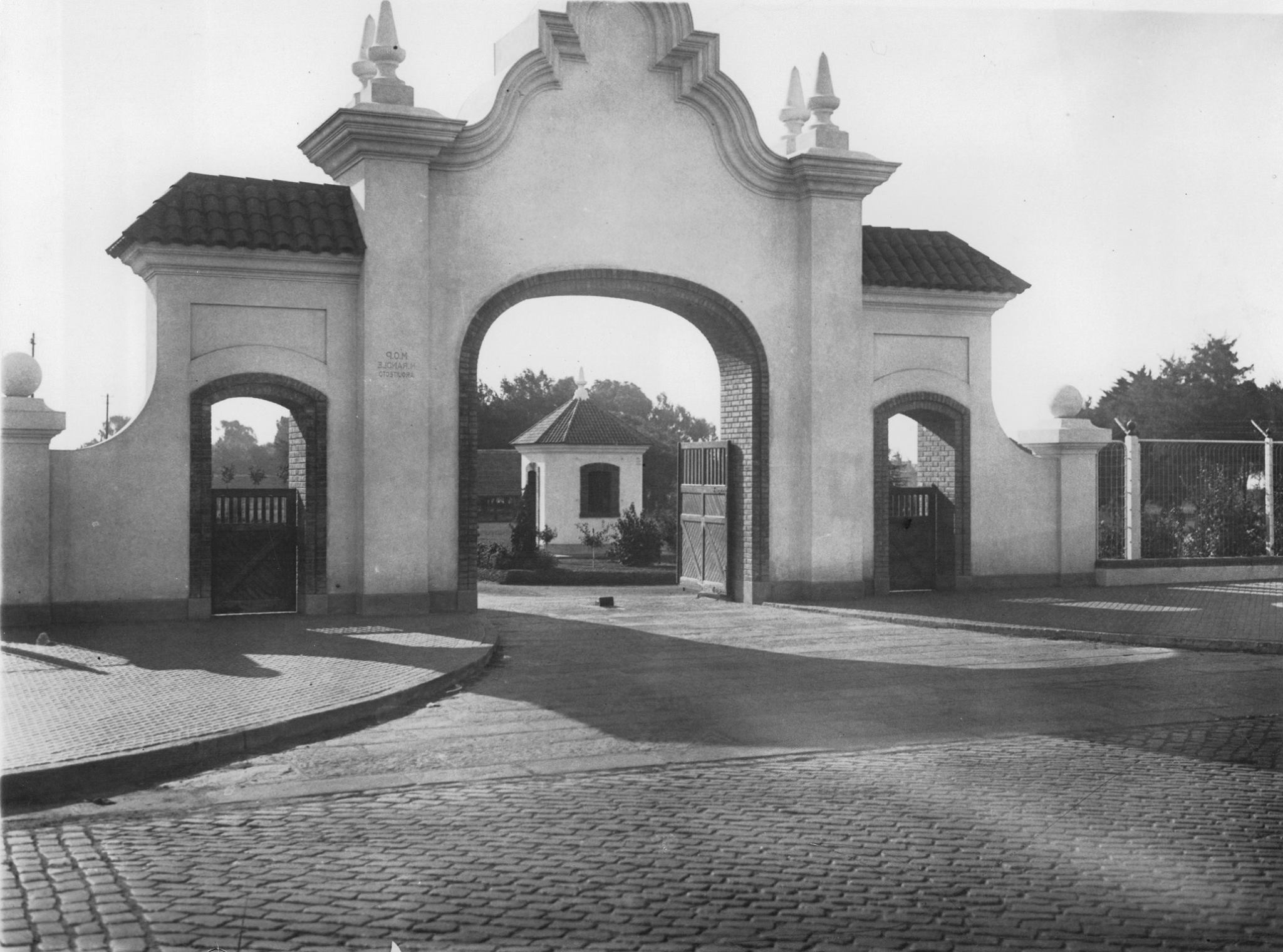
Main entrance on Avenida Maipú
