= Šokci =

South Slavic ethnic group

Total population
- Overall unknown 302 in Serbia (2022 census)

Regions with significant populations
- Croatia: Slavonia and Baranya; Serbia: Vojvodina; Hungary: Baranya

Languages
- Croatian

Religion
- Roman Catholicism

Related ethnic groups
- Bunjevci, Croats, and South Slavs

Šokci (Serbo-Croatian: Šokci / Шокци, pronounced [ʃǒkt͡si], SHOCK-tsee; singular masculine: Šokac / Шокац, feminine: Šokica / Шокица; Hungarian: Sokácok) are a South Slavic ethnic group native to historical regions of Baranya, Bačka, Slavonia, and Syrmia. These regions today span eastern Croatia, southwestern Hungary, and northern Serbia. They primarily self-identify as a subgroup of Croats and therefore they are not considered a separate ethnicity in Croatia and elsewhere.

== Population ==
Šokci are considered to be a native population of Slavonia and Syrmia in Croatia. The Croatian Bureau of Statistics does not record the Šokci as a separate ethnicity. According to the 2022 census in Serbia, 302 people declared as ethnic Šokci. Outside of Slavonia and Syrmia, they live in the settlements of Bački Monoštor, Sonta, Sombor, Bački Breg in the Serbian Bačka, and Hercegszántó in Hungary.

== Ethnonym ==
The term Šokac (masculine), Šokica and Šokčica (feminine), is used for the part of Croatian Ikavian speakers native in Slavonia, Baranja, Bačka and Bosnia. The oldest documents are from 1644–1698, 1702 (population of Đakovo Diocese), katolici, Šokci jali Slovinci ... Šokci rehuć Slovinci katolici. According to the contemporary Antun Kanižlić (1699–1766), the term Šokci was a slang reference to Catholic Slavonians that was used by the Orthodox. In Croatia, particularly in Lika it is opposed to term Vlachs (for Orthodox Serbs), and the Serbs pejoratively use it for the Croats. Denominal šokčiti ("Catholicize"), šoketati ("to speak Ikavian"). Eastern Slavonia and western Syrmia in Croatia is often referred to as Šokadija ("land of the Šokci"), although the term is not geographically limited, it is rather a general moniker for the Šokac "ancestral land".

The ethnonym is of unknown etymological derivation, and there are several hypotheses on the origin: Matija Petar Katančić (1750–1825), the first to theorize on the name, connected the ethnonym with the toponym of Succi or Succus in Thrace, found in the work of Ammianus Marcellinus (fl. 353–378). He also derived it from šljivov sok (plum juice). Ćiro Truhelka derived it from Albanian shoq < Latin sočius, but comparison to Montenegrin surname Šoć makes it dismissive. Others, including Vuk Karadžić, derived it from Italian word sciocco [ˈʃɔkko] ("frenzied, insane"). F. Kluge (1924) derived it from German schock, "a detachment of 60 men", which was the size of historical border patrols on the Sava. V. Skarić (1932) theorized that it was derived from German der Sachse ("Saxon", sh. Sas), for which there's lack of historical evidence. Petar Skok derived it from Turkish-Persian noun šoh ~ suh ("wicked, shameless, unclean") with suffix "-gin, -kin" ("unclean"). In his unfinished etymological dictionary published in 1973, the editors considered most reasonable the Romanian şoacăţ with primary meaning a mouse, and secondary meaning a mockery for Western Europeans (especially Germans) who dressed in urban fashion, from which derives adjective şoacăfesc (German), abstraction įoacăţie. Other assumptions are from Serbo-Croatian word skok or uskok ("to jump, leap, to jump in"), or from folk etymology šaka ("fist"), from the way they make the sign of the cross which is different from Orthodox's sign with three fingers.

== Origin ==
The origin of Šokci people is not completely clear. The prevalent opinion of modern scholars, based on etymology, is that they were Catholics who moved from the south, across the Sava from Bosnia, by the end of the Ottoman wars in Europe, as the Ottomans were retreating. The Šokci in Baranja are considered to be descendants of settlers from a mass migration of Croats from an area near Srebrenica, Bosnia into the region after the Ottoman retreat in the 18th century. However, there's also a theory, based on historical sources, that the Šokci need to be considered as autochthonous Catholic population of Slavonia and Syrmia (i.e. both Slavonian and Bosnian Posavina and Syrmia). The feeling of being indigenous rather than a settler is an important characteristic of the population.

== History ==
=== 16th century ===
The appearance and spreading of the name Šokac is relation with the Ottoman conquest and subsequent migrations of different confessional populations. The earliest known mention of the name Šokac, in the sense of toponym, is from Mačva in the Sanjak of Zvornik (1533). In the 1560s are recorded many anthroponyms deriving from the ethnonym of Šokac (Sokaç, Şokçe, Şokçit) in Srijem. A decade later are also present in Nógrád County and Sanjak of Požega. Since the late 16th century began Franciscans missions (mostly on the initiative of Ragusan priests) in Slavonia, Srijem and Podunavlje (including Bačka).

=== 17th century ===
Bartol Kašić in 1613 recorded that most of Christian Catholics in Sanjak of Syrmia, Sanjak of Segedin, Sanjak of Mohács and else are "sokaci di lingua croata". Four years later, Marin Dobrojević recorded that in that area of the Southern Pannonian Plain there's many Catholics who are "almost all of Slavic language, who are usually called Šokci". A 1615 Ottoman ferman by sultan Ahmed I prohibited Serb Orthodox metropolitans from taking various fees from [Catholic] "Hungarian and Šokci infidels". Another such ferman was issued in 1627 by Murat IV for "Šokci infidels" in the Sanjak of Požega. In 1628 and 1632 there was a dispute between "Dubrovnik Latins", "Šokci" and "Bosniaks" for the use of Catholic chapel in Belgrade, with the Šokci described as "artisans from Posavina and the villages around Belgrade and Požega". In 1633 are recorded in Našice.

They are also mentioned in the documents of the Roman Catholic Church where they requested Jeronim Lučić to become the bishop of Bosnia and Slavonia in 1635, a military court case regarding Serbian Patriarchate of Peć in Bosnia (with "Latin and Šokci dhimmi" of Motike and Dragočaj near Banja Luka, Kotor, Jajce), and in one writing from the time when Eugene of Savoy invaded Ottoman territory down to Sarajevo in 1697.

=== 18th century ===
In the 1702 census of Đakovo, one of the cities that was retaken from the Ottoman Empire following the Treaty of Karlowitz, there were 500–600 inhabitants described as Catholic Slav/Slavonian (Latin: Slavi catholicae fidae). Tadija Smičiklas later republished the same census and used the terms "Slovinci" and/or "Šokci", and claimed 400 inhabitants.

According to the Austrian census in Bačka from 1715, Serbs, Bunjevci, and Šokci comprised 97.6% of population. The 1720 census in Bačka recorded 72% Serbs and 22% Bunjevci and Šokci.

=== 19th century ===
In the old Austro-Hungarian censuses there was large number of Šokci, both in Croatia/Slavonia and in Serbia/Vojvodina. According to the 1840 data, the population of Croatia, Slavonia and Serbian Vojvodina numbered 1,605,730 people, of which 777,880 (48%) were Croats, 504,179 (32%) Serbs, and 297,747 (19%) Šokci. The Šokci were concentrated in the Požega, Virovitica, and Syrmia counties, and in the Slavonian Military Frontier.

=== 20th century ===
According to the 1910 census in Austria-Hungary, there were 88,209 Bunjevci and Šokci in the Hungarian part.

=== Contemporary ===
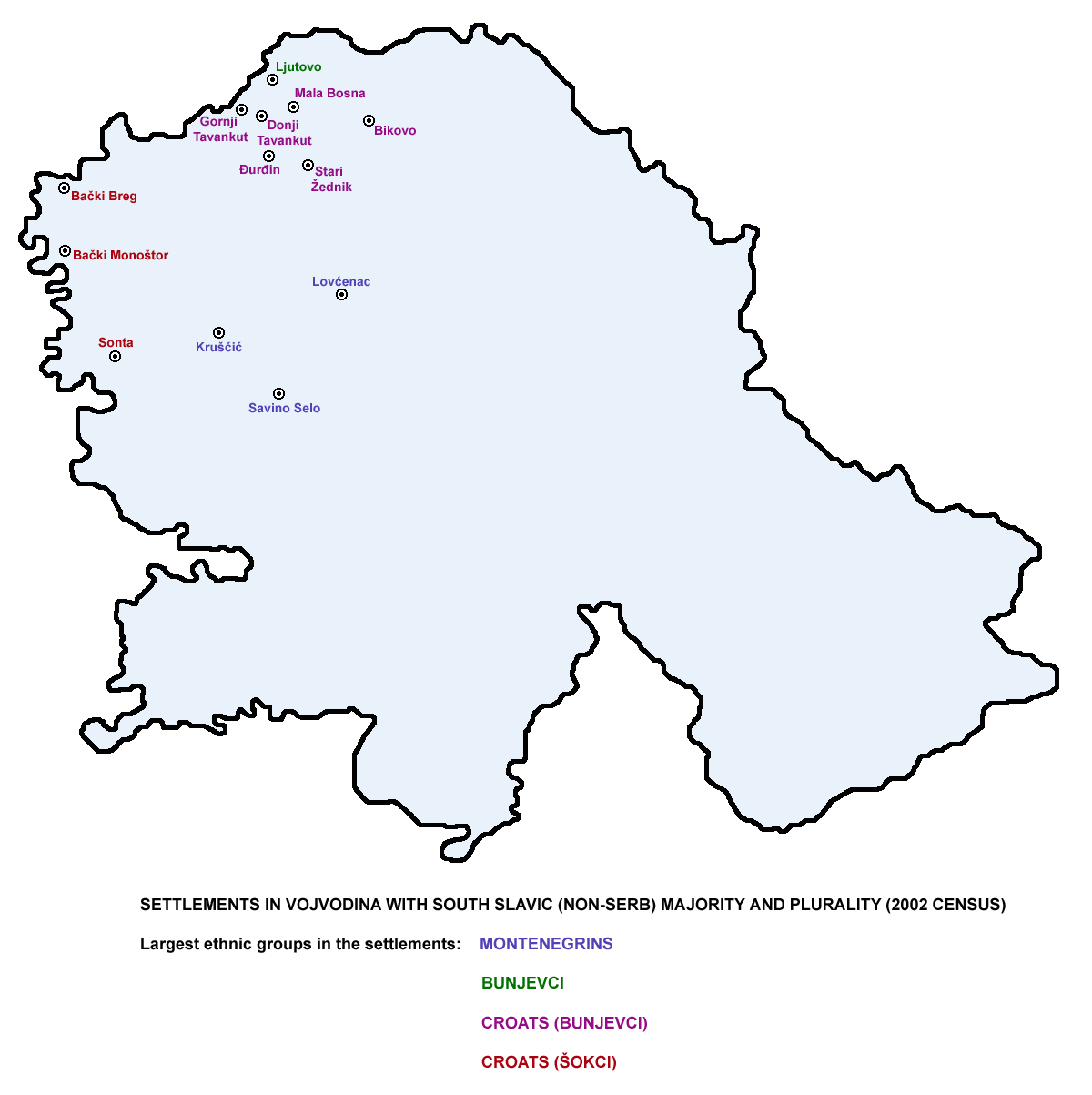
Data from the 2002 Serbian census indicates villages in Vojvodina where a significant population declared their ethnicity as Šokci. The villages where there is a significant presence of Šokci who declare their ethnicity as Croats are not indicated on the map.

Šokci living in Croatia and Hungary, as well as many of those living in Serbia, today usually consider themselves to be a subgroup of Croats. In Serbia, Šokci and Bunjevci have been recorded as a separate "modality" or national or ethnic affiliation by the national censuses in 1991, 2002, 2011, and 2022. Unlike Bunjevci, the other Catholic Slavic group from the same area, Šokci mostly declare themselves as Croats rather than the separate group, and some have also declared themselves Yugoslavs in the census. In the 1991 census, there were 1,922 declared Šokci in Serbia, and a much larger number of Croats. The population that declared "Šokci" as an ethnicity in the 2022 census is small (302), while there were 39,107 declared Croats.

In general, the number and the percentage of the Šokci has decreased because of an unwritten policy that each family should have only one child, because they did not wish to divide their estate and other riches in each following generation. Unfortunately such a practice worked up until the 19th/20th century, at which point they were practically overwhelmed in number by the immigrants which had a much larger reproduction rate (certainly over two children per family at the time).

Villages with numerous Šokac population in the region of Bačka are: Sonta (Apatin municipality), Bački Breg and Bački Monoštor (Sombor municipality). In 2022 census in Serbia, most of the inhabitants of these villages declared themselves as Croats.

Most of the Hungarian Šokci live in the Baranya region, particularly in the town of Mohács.

== Religion ==
The Šokci are Roman Catholic by faith and follow the Latin Rite.

== Language ==
The Šokci speak an old-Shtokavian Slavonian sub-dialect that is almost exclusively spoken by Šokci. The Slavonian dialect has a mixed Ikavian and Ekavian accent: Ikavian is predominant in Posavina, Baranja, Bačka and in the Slavonian sub-dialect enclave of Derventa; and Ekavian in Podravina. There are also enclaves of one accent in the territory of the other, and also of mixed Ekavian–Ikavian and Jekavian–Ikavian accents. In some villages in Hungary, the original Slavic yat sound is preserved.

== Culture ==
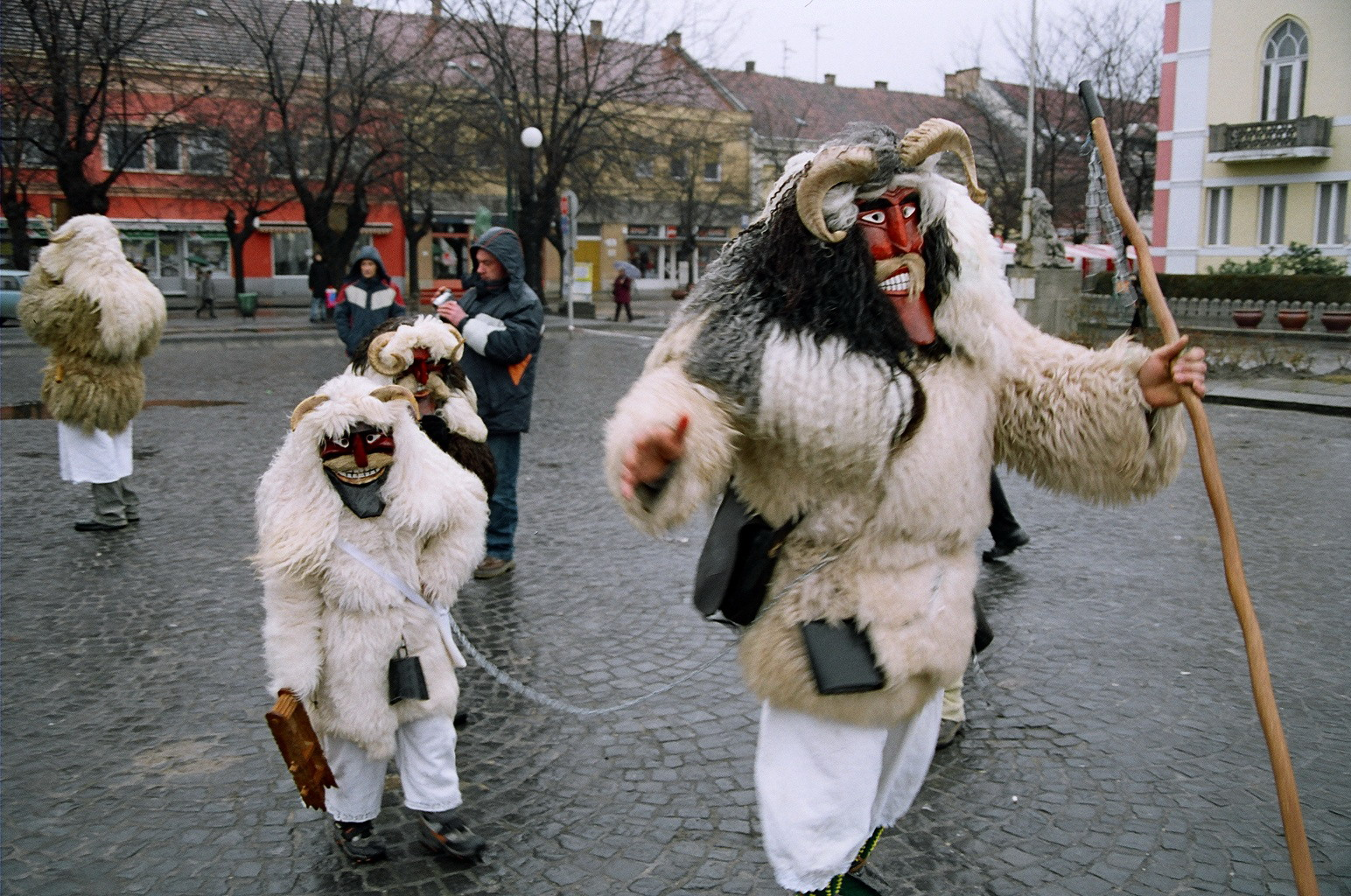
Šokci people celebrating the end of winter in traditional masks, in Mohács, Hungary,

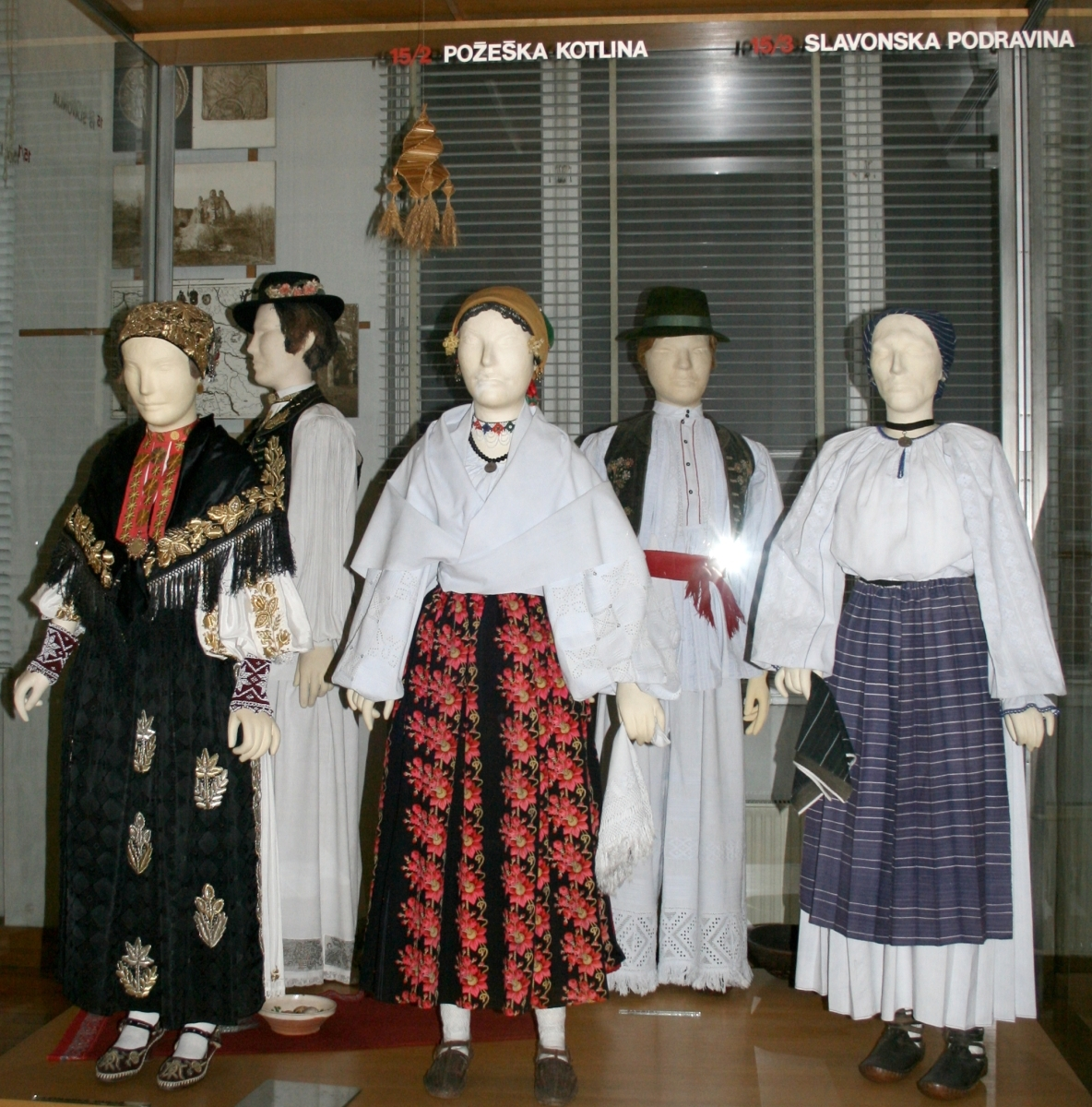
Šokci traditional dress from Požega-Slavonia County, Croatia

=== Traditions ===
Many of the traditions of the Šokci are influenced by their environment – they live in the fertile Pannonian plain where they cultivate grains and corn in large fields surrounding their villages. The villages often have one main street (šor) where each subsequent family house has auxiliary buildings and a spacious yard, as well as a water well. The central street is surrounded on both sides by water channels, which have small crossings in order for one to reach the house.

Families often keep poultry, particularly ducks and geese, although the main source of meat are the pigs, which are almost inevitably kept by a Šokac. They enjoy pork-based products such as ham, sausages (particularly kulen) and bacon. These products are customarily obtained by the traditional autumn slaughtering. The most common fruit are plums, not least because it is often fermented into liquor called rakija.

The abundance in which they have traditionally lived has made the Šokci a naturally merry people, who pay a lot of attention to folklore. Each Šokac village inevitably has a cultural society where they cultivate their folk songs and dances. A popular folk custom is the bećarac. They also hold a yearly festivity called the "Šokačko sijelo", held over a nine-day period in February, being the largest traditional event in the area of Posavina near Županja, featuring local culture and traditions.

=== Music ===
The most recognisable feature of Šokci culture is their music which is played mostly on the tambura instrument. Many tambura bands achieved nationwide fame in Croatia. The body of the tambura was traditionally made of the wood of maple, poplar or plum trees, while today it's mostly made of spruce or fir trees. Another instruments used in the past was the bagpipe. The traditional wedding festivities are paid much attention to, sometimes even catching the attention of entire villages.

=== Folk costumes ===
The traditional outfit of the Šokci, called the rubina, is made of white linen cloth with lace decorations, and the main part of it is a blouse called oplećak i krila. The women mostly wear the entire outfit only in the summer, replacing it with a wool skirt in the winter. The most esteemed decoration of a Šokac outfit are the gold coins known as dukati (ducats). A rich Šokac girl would have a large number of dukati weaved onto her chest not only as a decoration but as a clear sign that she comes from a wealthy family.

== Prominent individuals ==
- Ivan Skerlecz, Croatian ban, born in Oroszló
- Josip Šokčević, Croatian ban, born in Vinkovci
- Mara Švel-Gamiršek, Croatian writer
- Matija Antun Relković, Croatian writer, born in Davor
- Julijana Matanović, Croatian writer
- Josip Kozarac, Croatian writer, born in Vinkovci
- Ivan Kozarac, Croatian writer, born in Vinkovci
- Ilija Okrugić, Croatian writer, born in Sremski Karlovci
- Martin Novoselac, Croatian football player and coach, born in Vinkovci
- Ivica Olić, Croatian professional footballer, born in Davor
- Ivan Rakitić, Croatian professional footballer, father from Sikirevci
- Goran Vlaović, Croatian professional footballer, born in Nova Gradiška
- Fabijan Šovagović, Croatian actor, born in Ladimirevci
- Flórián Albert, Hungarian football player, European Footballer of the Year in 1967, born in Hercegszántó
- Mario Mandžukić, Croatian professional footballer, born in Slavonski Brod

== Gallery ==
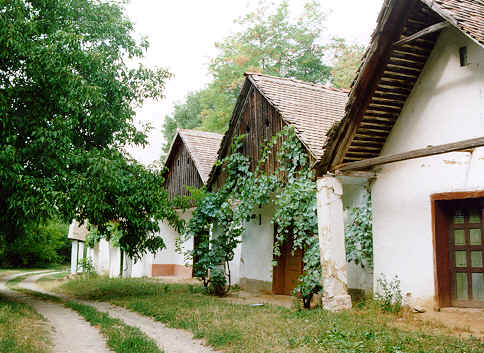
Šokac wine cellars in Draž, Croatia

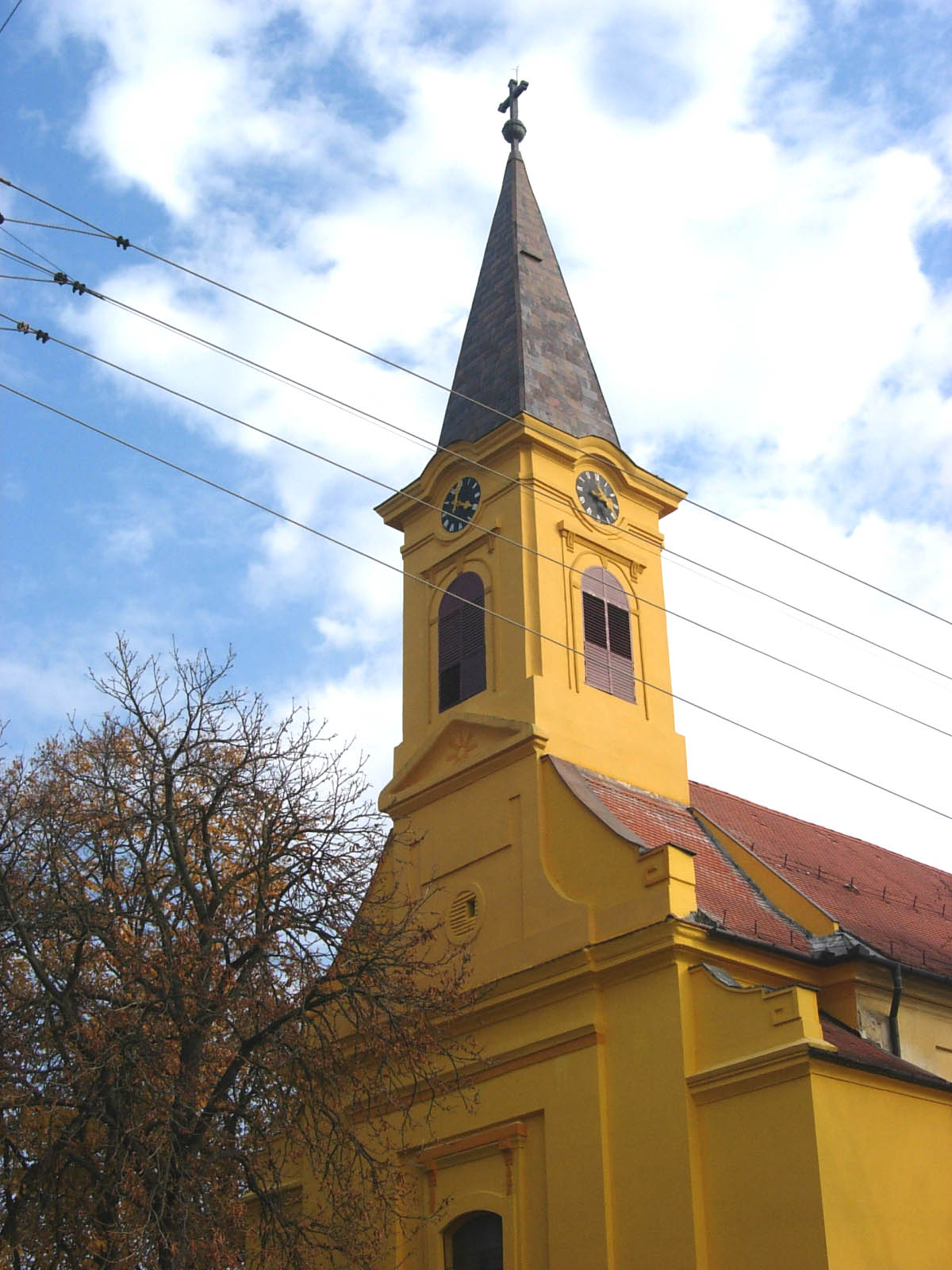
Catholic Church in the Šokac village of Bački Monoštor, Serbia

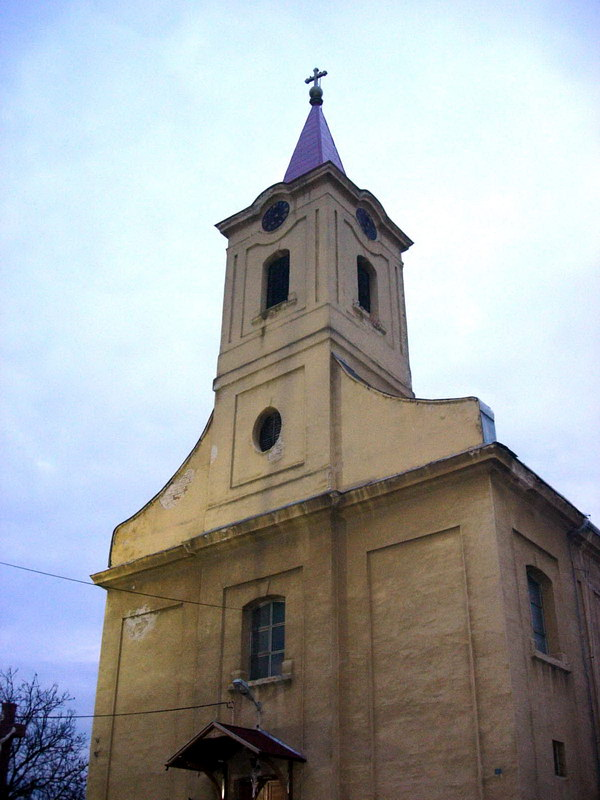
Catholic Church in the Šokac village of Bački Breg, Serbia

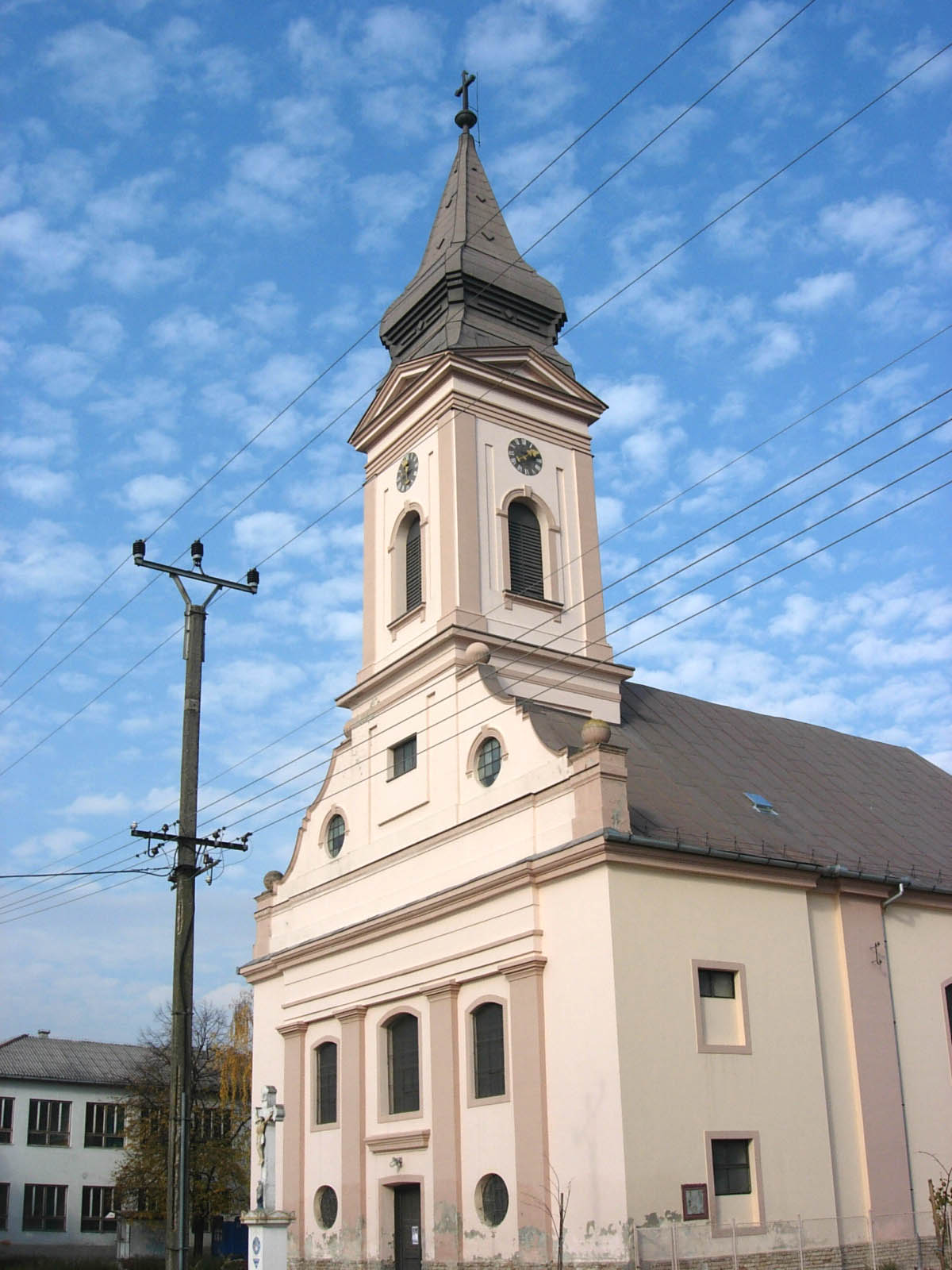
Catholic Church in the Šokac village of Sonta, Serbia

== See also ==
- Bunjevci
- South Slavs
- Busójárás

== Sources ==
- Bara, Mario (2022). "Etnonim Šokac: imenovanje, ishodište i rasprostiranje" [Ethnonym Šokac: naming, origin and distribution]. Šokačka rič 19: Slavonski dijalekt i sociolingvistika (in Croatian). Vinkovci: Zajednica kulturno-umjetničkih djelatnosti Vukovarsko-srijemske županije. pp. 327–341. ISBN 978-953-8366-02-4.
- John Van Antwerp Fine (2006). When ethnicity did not matter in the Balkans: a study of identity in pre-nationalist Croatia, Dalmatia, and Slavonia in the medieval and early-modern periods. University of Michigan Press. ISBN 978-0-472-11414-6.
- Hadžihusejnović-Valašek, Miroslava (March 1993). "Baranja je "tvrd orah". Analiza istraživanja i popularizacije tradicijske baranjske folklorne glazbe" [Baranja is "tough nut". Records and popularisation analysis of traditional Baranja folk music] (PDF). Studia ethnologica Croatica (in Croatian). 4 (1). Department of Ethnology and Cultural Anthropology, Faculty of Humanities and Social Sciences, University of Zagreb. ISSN 1330-3627.
- Ivan Ivanić (1899). Bunjevci i Šokci u Bačkoj, Baranji i Lici. Dr. Dimitrijević.
- Pšihistal, Ružica (June 2011). "The Ethnomyth of Šokci". Narodna Umjetnost: Croatian Journal of Ethnology and Folklore Research. 48 (1). Zagreb, Croatia: Institute of Ethonology and Folklore Research. ISSN 0547-2504.
- Ante Sekulić (1989). Bački Bunjevci i Šokci. Školska knj. ISBN 978-86-03-99172-7.
- Skenderović, Robert (2017). Povijest podunavskih Hrvata (Bunjevaca i Šokaca) od doseljavanja do propasti Austro-Ugarske Monarhije [The history of the Croats in Hungarian Danube region (Bunjevci and Šokci) from the immigration period until the collapse of the Austro-Hungarian Monarchy] (in Croatian). Subotica, Slavonski Brod: Zavod za kulturu vojvođanskih Hrvata, Hrvatski institut za povijest - Podružnica za povijest Slavonije, Srijema i Baranje. ISBN 978-953-8102-14-1.
