= Ivo Rojnica =

Croatian fascist official (1915–2007)

- A portrait of Rojnica in his later years

Authorized Representative of the President of Croatia to Argentina and Latin America
- In office 1991–1994

Ustaše Commissioner of Dubrovnik
- In office 23 May 1941 – 12 December 1941
- Preceded by: Position established
- Succeeded by: Vlado Herceg

Personal details
- Born: 20 August 1915 Cista, Imotski, Kingdom of Dalmatia
- Died: 1 December 2007 (aged 92) Buenos Aires, Argentina
- Spouse: Ana Rojnica
- Awards: Order of Merit, 2nd Class; Order of St. Gregory the Great; Order of Duke Trpimir, with Necklet

Military service
- Allegiance: Independent State of Croatia; Nazi Germany
- Branch/service: Ustaše Militia; Abwehr
- Years of service: 1941–1945
- Rank: Lieutenant
- Battles/wars: World War II

Ivo Rojnica (20 August 1915 – 1 December 2007) was a Croatian Ustaše official and intelligence agent who was active in the World War II Axis puppet state known as the Independent State of Croatia (NDH) from 1941 to 1945. After the war, he escaped to Argentina, where he reinvented himself as a businessman and diplomat.

Having joined the fascist, Croatian nationalist Ustaše movement in 1939, Rojnica was appointed as the commissioner (Croatian: Stožernik) of Dubrovnik shortly after the establishment of the NDH in April 1941. In this capacity, he oversaw the implementation of the Ustaše movement's repressive anti-Serb and anti-Semitic measures there. In June 1941, he issued a decree limiting the freedom of movement of Dubrovnik's Jewish and Serb inhabitants. At least 58 individuals were executed on Rojnica's orders between May and December 1941. Upon completing his tenure, he engaged in intelligence work for the rest of the war, and received a decoration from Ustaše leader Ante Pavelić. In May 1945, Rojnica fled to Italy, and was arrested by the British Army the following year. Fearing extradition to Yugoslavia, he feigned a mental breakdown and was transferred to a poorly guarded psychiatric hospital from which he escaped.

Rojnica emigrated to Argentina under a pseudonym in 1947 and was granted Argentine citizenship in 1951. Three years later, he petitioned to be recognized under a Hispanicized variant of his real name. Opening a textile factory, he distinguished himself as a successful businessman and an active member of the country's Croatian émigré community, co-founding several cultural societies and publications. In recognition of his charitable activities, he was awarded the Order of St. Gregory the Great by the Holy See. However, he was also suspected of financing several Croatian nationalist aircraft hijackings in the early to mid-1970s. A close associate and supporter of the President of Argentina, Carlos Menem, Rojnica was appointed as the Authorized Representative of the President of Croatia to Argentina and Latin America in 1991. During the Yugoslav Wars, he financed the smuggling of Argentine weaponry to Croatia in violation of a United Nations arms embargo. In February 1993, the Government of Croatia announced its intention to appoint him as the country's ambassador to Argentina. The move caused a public outcry and the Croatian government ultimately reversed its decision. Rojnica died in Buenos Aires in 2007, at the age of 92, having never been indicted or stood trial.

== Early life ==
Ivo Rojnica was born on 20 August 1915 in the village of Cista, near Imotski, in what was then Austria-Hungary and is now Croatia. He was the fourth of eleven children born to Stipan and Anđa Rojnica (née Madunić). In his youth, he relocated to the coastal town of Dubrovnik, where he completed his secondary education and subsequently opened a textile business. In 1939, he joined Ante Pavelić's fascist, Croatian nationalist Ustaše movement.

== World War II ==
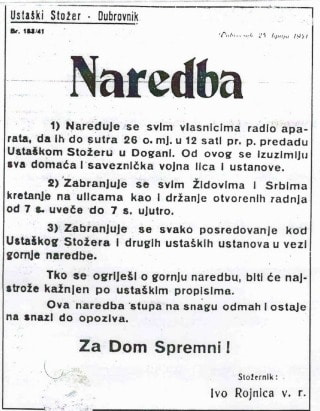
Decree issued by Rojnica in June 1941 forbidding Dubrovnik's Jewish and Serb inhabitants from walking the streets and operating their businesses from 7:00 p.m. to 7:00 a.m.

In the years leading up to the Axis invasion of Yugoslavia, Rojnica served as an agent of the Abwehr, Germany's military intelligence service, where he received the code name "Ante". Following the invasion and occupation of Yugoslavia, the Axis created a puppet state known as the Independent State of Croatia (NDH), which was placed under Ustaše rule, and which consisted of most of modern-day Croatia, all of modern-day Bosnia and Herzegovina, and parts of modern-day Serbia. On 18 May 1941, Italy and the NDH signed the Treaty of Rome, whereby the latter was given control of Dubrovnik in exchange for the cession of the rest of Dalmatia, which was integrated into the Italian state as the Governorate of Dalmatia. On 23 May 1941, Rojnica was appointed as the commissioner (Croatian: Stožernik) of Dubrovnik. The same day, local Ustaše launched a campaign of arrests, killings and expulsions targeting the movement's ideological opponents, such as members of the Communist Party of Yugoslavia. Serbs and Jews were also singled out for persecution, with the latter being forced to wear a yellow star around their arm, and to mark their properties with the Star of David.

Between 4 and 5 June 1941, the Dubrovnik Ustaše arrested the bank clerk Nikola Mašanović, the municipal treasurer Branko Hope, the merchant Branko Radonić and the journalist Jaša Miloslavić. The four men were then killed and their bodies were thrown into a river. The historian Nikola Anić argues that Rojnica was among those most responsible for these murders, given that he was Dubrovnik's most senior Ustaše official. Afterwards, Rojnica received the expropriated property of Blagoje Čorolija, the owner of a Dubrovnik delicatessen. On 25 June, Rojnica issued a decree ordering the confiscation of all radios in Dubrovnik and restricting the movement of the city's Jews and Serbs. It read as follows:

It is forbidden for all Jews and Serbs to walk on the streets as well as to keep their stores open from 7 p.m. to 7 a.m. Any intervention through the Ustaše command and other Ustaše institutions related to the order above is forbidden. Anyone violating the above order will be punished according to Ustaše regulations. This order comes into force immediately and remains in force until its revocation. For the homeland – ready!

— Stožernik Ivo Rojnica, v.r.

Over the course of several months, many of the Serbs and Jews who were not able to escape Dubrovnik were killed or deported to concentration camps such as Jasenovac. One notable such massacre took place on 1 July 1941, when Rojnica's subordinates executed 13 captives—mostly Serbs—near the hamlet of Lisačke Rudine, in the village of Lisac. Rojnica's tenure as the Ustaše Commissioner of Dubrovnik lasted until 12 December 1941. He was succeeded by Vlado Herceg, who had previously served as a warrant officer in the Poglavnik's Bodyguard Brigade (Croatian: Poglavnikova tjelesna bojna), which was tasked with guarding Pavelić. For the rest of the war, Rojnica took part in intelligence gathering activities. In 1943, he was promoted to the rank of lieutenant (Croatian: Poručnik) in the Ustaše Militia. Pavelić also bestowed him with the Order of Merit, 2nd Class. In the war's final months, Rojnica extorted refugees passing through Dubrovnik, forcing them to pay him exorbitant sums in return for safe passage.

== Exile ==
In May 1945, with the Yugoslav Partisans approaching Zagreb, Rojnica retreated to Austria with elements of the Croatian Armed Forces. Shortly thereafter, he settled in the Italian city of Trieste under the pseudonym Ivan Rajčinović, together with his wife Ana and their young daughter. In May 1946, he was arrested by the British Army after a woman recognized him as the killer of one of her relatives. (Note: According to the author Jorge Camarasa, the woman who identified Rojnica and alerted the authorities was the daughter-in-law of one of his victims, a Jewish physician. She also named Rojnica as the killer of Leo Klein, another Dubrovnik Jew. In contrast, Uki Goñi identifies the woman as the widow of a Dubrovnik Jew who had been deported to Jasenovac.) Whilst he was in custody, Yugoslav officials sent the British a comprehensive dossier detailing his wartime activities. It contained a list of 58 individuals who were executed on his orders between May and December 1941, as well as several eyewitness testimonies. Fearing that he would be extradited to Yugoslavia, Rojnica feigned a mental breakdown and was transferred to a laxly guarded psychiatric hospital, from which he was able to escape.

In late March or early April 1947, (Note: The scholar Slaven Ravlić writes that Rojnica entered Argentina on 31 March 1947. According to Goñi, Rojnica arrived on 2 April.) Rojnica landed in Argentina as a stowaway aboard the passenger ship Maria C. (Note: The Maria C. and her sister ship Anna C. were laid down in Genoa shortly after the war, which had all but devastated Italy's passenger fleet. Together, the two vessels ferried tens of thousands of refugees from Europe to South America.) His escape had been facilitated by the Ustaše functionary and Roman Catholic priest Krunoslav Draganović, one of the main organizers of the network of ratlines smuggling fascist war crimes suspects out of Europe. Rojnica entered the country under the same pseudonym he had used in Trieste. In August, his family was reunited with him, also disembarking from the Maria C. The family settled in Vicente López, a suburb of Buenos Aires, where Rojnica opened a textile factory called Pulloverfin. On 31 August 1951, he was granted Argentine citizenship under the false name he had used to enter the country, and on 20 December 1954, he successfully petitioned the government to legally change his name to Juan Rojnica.

Rojnica became an active member of Argentina's Croatian émigré community, helping establish several cultural societies and publications. In 1951, he co-founded the Croatian Republican Union (Croatian: Hrvatska republikanska zajednica), and was later a co-founder of the Croatian–Latin American Cultural Institute (Croatian: Hrvatsko–latinoamerički kulturni institut), both of which were based in Buenos Aires. He also co-founded the Croatian–Argentine Cultural Institute (Croatian: Hrvatsko–argentinsko kulturno društvo) and the journal Studia Croatica. Additionally, he was the primary financial backer of the Croatian Review (Croatian: Hrvatska Revija), a quarterly published by the former Ustaše official Vinko Nikolić. He contributed his own writings to Nikolić's quarterly, as well as to another journal known as The Morning Star (Croatian: Danica). In recognition of his charitable work, Rojnica was awarded the Order of St. Gregory the Great by the Holy See.

Despite his own role in The Holocaust, Rojnica attempted to foster business ties with Jews both in Argentina and in Israel. In 1969, he published the first volume of his three-volume memoir Meetings and Experiences (Croatian: Susreti i doživljaji). In his memoirs, he attempted to minimize the actions of the NDH by asserting that the Ustaše had no intention of exterminating the puppet state's Serb population, that no more than 250,000 Serbs had been expelled and that no more than 450 Serbs had been forcibly converted to Roman Catholicism. Most historians agree that around 300,000 Serbs were killed by the Ustaše between 1941 and 1945, or about 17 percent of the NDH's Serb population. According to the scholar Sabrina P. Ramet, by 1943, 120,000 Serbs were deported to German-occupied Serbia and a further 300,000 were forced to flee the NDH. Additionally, from 1941 to 1942, between 97,000 and 300,000 Serbs were subjected to forced conversion. (Note: According to the historian Jozo Tomasevich, between 1941 and 1942, the Ustaše succeeded in forcibly converting 200,000–300,000 Serbs to Roman Catholicism. This figure is accepted by the scholar Stella Alexander. The historian Mark Biondich has found evidence of 97,447–99,333 forced conversions, though the documentary record is incomplete.) Referring to anti-Semitic atrocities, Rojnica stated that "Croats are not guilty for the fate of the Jews," and maintained that the Germans were solely responsible for The Holocaust in Croatia.

Rojnica was suspected of financing several Croatian nationalist aircraft hijackings that took place in the United States and Europe in the early to mid-1970s. His wife was kidnapped on 23 November 1973. She was released eight days later after Rojnica paid her captors 70 million Argentine pesos. Neither the perpetrators nor their motives were ever publicly identified. In 1974, Rojnica attended the inaugural meeting of the Croatian National Council (Croatian: Hrvatsko narodno vijeće), a body representing various Croatian émigré organizations, in Toronto. In 1977, he and Vjekoslav Vrančić, another former high-ranking Ustaše official, were detained in New Zealand on a layover to Australia, where they were to attend a meeting of Croatian nationalists. Yugoslavia requested their extradition but the two were released at the intervention of the Argentine embassy and returned to Buenos Aires.

== Breakup of Yugoslavia and ambassadorship controversy ==
Rojnica with Croatian President Franjo Tuđman

In 1991, Rojnica was appointed as the Authorized Representative of the President of Croatia to Argentina and Latin America. The breakup of Yugoslavia and the outbreak of the Croatian War of Independence in the early 1990s had galvanized the Croatian diaspora in Argentina, which by 1991 numbered around 100,000. Rojnica was a close associate of Carlos Menem, who served as the President of Argentina between 1989 and 1999, and exploited this relationship to illegally procure Argentine arms for Croatia. (Note: Camarasa identifies Rojnica as a major financial backer of Menem's successful presidential bid in the 1989 Argentine general election, and traces the beginning of their relationship back to this period.) United Nations Security Council Resolution 713, passed on 25 September 1991, had imposed an international arms embargo on Yugoslavia and its constituent republics. In late 1991, Menem signed two secret presidential decrees, authorizing the sale of 6,500 tonnes (6,400 long tons; 7,200 short tons) of weapons to Panama, which were then diverted to Croatia. In early 1992, Menem signed another secret presidential decree, authorizing the sale of thousands of automatic rifles, handguns, hand grenades, howitzers, mortars and landmines to Bolivia, which with Menem's knowledge, were again diverted to Croatia. Rojnica also established a paramilitary camp on Argentine soil to recruit and train Croatian mercenaries. On 16 January 1992, Menem met with a delegation of Croat émigrés headed by Rojnica at Quinta de Olivos and announced that Argentina would recognize Croatia's declaration of independence from Yugoslavia—the first Latin American country to do so. Several weeks later, a representative of the Simon Wiesenthal Center met with Argentine officials demanding Rojnica's arrest, noting that his name figured prominently in a list of eighteen war crimes suspects alleged to be hiding in Argentina that the organization had given to the country's Minister of the Interior, José Luis Manzano. Despite the request, the Argentine authorities failed to investigate Rojnica, and he continued to be photographed attending events alongside President Menem. That July, Rojnica accompanied Menem on an official visit to Zagreb.

On 3 February 1993, the Government of Croatia announced its intention to appoint Rojnica as the country's ambassador to Argentina. (Note: At the time, the President of Croatia had the right to personally appoint five individuals to the Croatian Parliament's Chamber of Counties. One of the five appointed by Tuđman around this time was Rojnica's ex-Ustaše colleague Vinko Nikolić.) News of Rojnica's appointment and the allegations against him were soon widely reported in the Argentine press, prompting numerous complaints and protests. The case gained widespread attention that August when the Croatian weekly Feral Tribune published a copy of the anti-Semitic and anti-Serb decree that Rojnica had issued in Dubrovnik in June 1941. Despite the controversy, several members of the Croatian cabinet, the Croatian Parliament and the country's Roman Catholic clergy came to his defense. Frane Franić, Archbishop of the Roman Catholic Archdiocese of Split-Makarska, praised him as "a deeply religious man" who "deserves the highest Croatian medals". Amid widespread public criticism, the President of Croatia, Franjo Tuđman, ultimately reversed his decision, but never issued a formal apology. Rojnica himself was unapologetic, telling the Feral Tribune, "everything I did in 1941 I would do again." He blamed "enemies of the Croatian state" for his dismissal, saying that the Feral Tribune had "set him up", targeted him for "public defamation" and "forced the president into such action".

Rojnica held out as the Authorized Representative of the President of Croatia to Argentina and Latin America until 1994, orchestrating diplomatic activities "from the shadows," in the words of author Uki Goñi, before leaving the role that January. On 8 November 1994, Tuđman bestowed him with the Order of Duke Trpimir, with Necklet for "promoting the reputation of the Republic of Croatia in the Republic of Argentina, and especially for working to coalesce the political, cultural and civilizational values of the Croatian people in the period after the Second World War". In 1996, he was granted an audience with the mayor of Dubrovnik, Ivo Obuljen.

== Later years and death ==
In March 1997, Menem acceded to a request from the Simon Wiesenthal Center to hand over the bank records of 334 Nazi officials and their wives and mistresses who had fled to Argentina after the war; Rojnica's name was absent from the files. In 1998, the Simon Wiesenthal Center requested that he be indicted, extradited and tried, but received no response from the Argentine authorities. The Argentine press attributed Rojnica's apparent immunity to the sizeable financial contributions former Ustaše members had made to Menem's electoral campaigns. Rojnica denied making any campaign contributions to Menem. When pressed on the issue, Croatian officials stated they did not have sufficient evidence to indict Rojnica and seek his extradition. Rojnica became the subject of renewed media scrutiny in May 1998, following the widely publicized arrest of former Jasenovac commander Dinko Šakić, who had also settled in Argentina after the war. In an interview with La Nación that month, Rojnica admitted to serving as the Ustaše commissioner of Dubrovnik, but dismissed the war crimes allegations against him, calling them "a big lie invented by the Serbs and by the communists", and adding, "I am a hero of Croatia!" When Stjepan Mesić, who succeeded Tuđman as the President of Croatia in 2000, voiced support for Rojnica's extradition, he was subjected to threats.

In 2001, the director of the Simon Wiesenthal Center's Jerusalem office, Efraim Zuroff, listed Rojnica among eight "major Nazi war criminals" still at large. The following year, Rojnica published a book titled Witness to Truth and Justice (Croatian: Svjedok istine i pravde). In 2006, Zuroff again called for him to be prosecuted. The following year, he criticized the Serbian authorities for failing to issue arrest warrants for Rojnica and two other Axis war crimes suspects—the Croatian Milivoj Ašner and the Hungarian Sándor Képíró. Rojnica died in Buenos Aires on 1 December 2007, at the age of 92. The following day, he was buried at a local cemetery, El Jardin de la Paz. In response to the news, Alen Budaj, a representative of a Croatian Jewish organization, expressed indignation that Rojnica had never been indicted or stood trial.

Rojnica's grandson, Ivo Esteban Rojnica, was one of Argentina's most successful black market currency traders until his arrest by the Argentine authorities in October 2023 on suspicion of laundering drug money for the Sinaloa Cartel.
