= 1986 Iquique arms factory explosion =

Industrial Accident

- Date: January 25, 1986
- Location: Iquique, Chile
- Type: explosion
- Deaths: 29
- Injuries: 11

On January 25, 1986, a large explosion occurred at the Cardoen Armaments Factory in the Alto Hospicio industrial suburb of the coastal Chilean city Iquique, killing 29 workers and seriously injuring 11. Only four bodies were recovered, with the others vaporised by the blast, according to Irene Rojas, a reporter for the Iquique newspaper La Estrella. The plant, one of five arms factories owned by industrialist Carlos Cardoen, was the largest in Chile at the time. The explosion occurred in the cluster bomb arming section of the plant, which had been exporting the 500 pound bombs to Iraq for use during the Iran–Iraq War since 1983. According to Luis Narváez, a reporter investigating Chile's arms dealing and Pinochet's offshore bank accounts for La Nación, there was a persistent rumor among Chileans that the explosion was the result of sabotage, possibly committed by Chilean soldiers. The given motive for this alleged attack was to punish Cardoen for not cooperating fully with a "mafia like" syndicate of Chilean arms manufacturers, and for providing too much competition for other manufacturers such as FAMAE.

== See also ==
- Río Tercero explosion
