= Bački Monoštor =

Bački Monoštor Бачки Моноштор (Serbian) Monoštor (Croatian) Monostorszeg (Hungarian)
- Village (Selo)
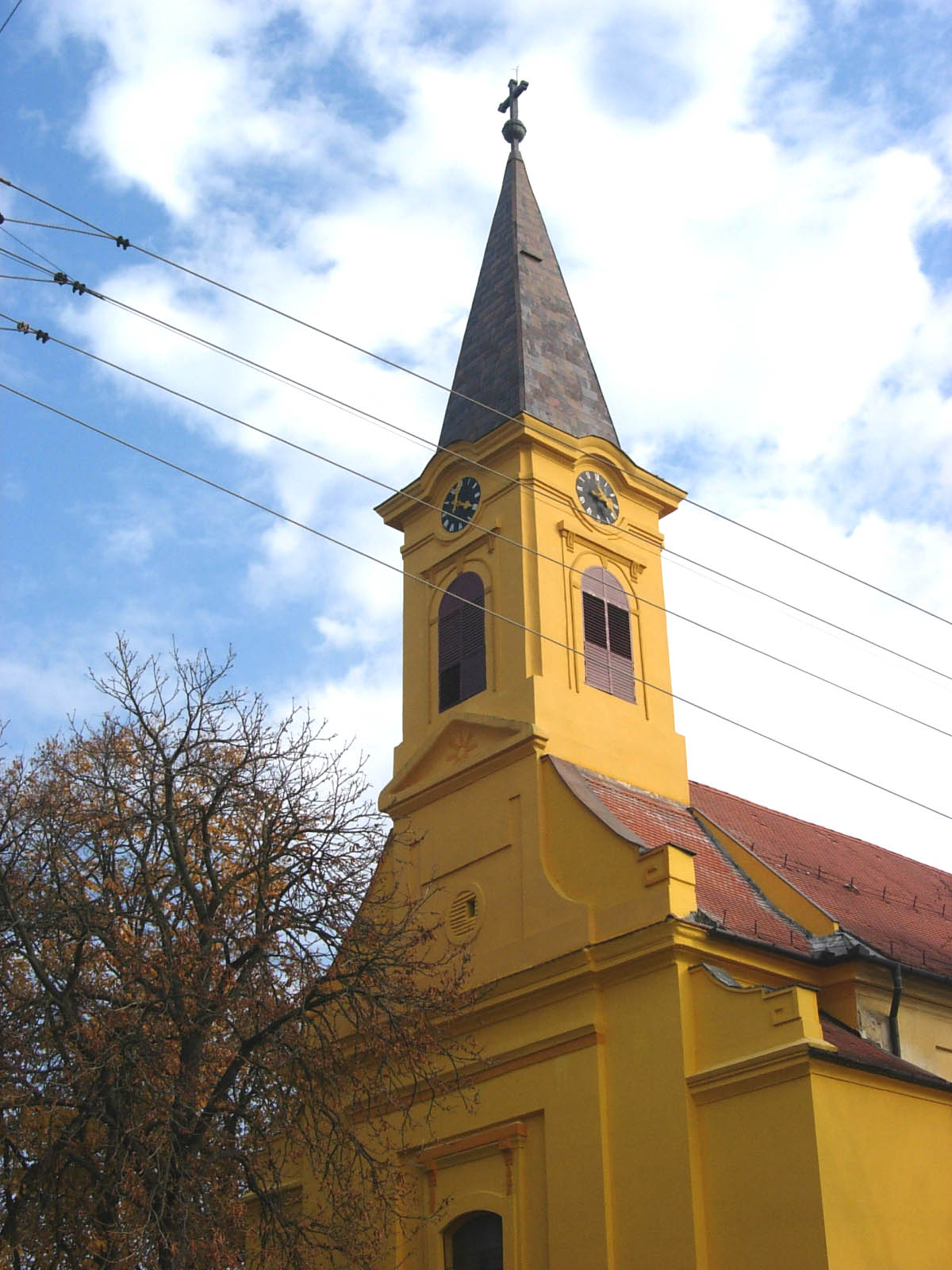
- The Saint Peter and Paul Catholic Church

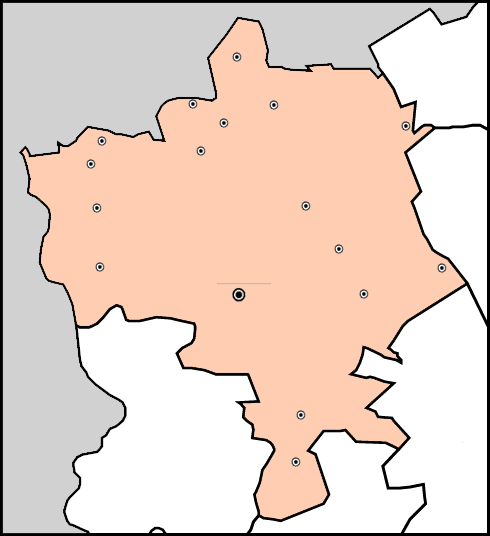
- Interactive map of Bački Monoštor
- Location within Vojvodina Location within Serbia Location within Europe
- Coordinates: 45°47′N 18°56′E
- Country: Serbia
- Province: Vojvodina
- Region: Bačka (Podunavlje)
- District: West Bačka
- Municipality: Sombor

Area
  - Total: 98.12 km^{2} (37.88 sq mi)
- Elevation: 86 m (282 ft)

Population (2022)
  - Total: 2,647
- Postal code: 25 272

Bački Monoštor (Serbian Cyrillic: Бачки Моноштор) is a village located in the municipality of Sombor, West Bačka District, Vojvodina, Serbia. It has a population of 2,647 inhabitants (2022 census).

== Name ==
In Serbian the village is known as Бачки Моноштор or Bački Monoštor, in Croatian as Monoštor (since 2009) or Bački Monoštor (before 2009), in Hungarian as Monostorszeg.

== History ==
The village of Monostor, located on Siga, was constantly flooded and its population thus settled at the location of Bački Monoštor some time before 1722. The parish of Monostor was established in 1722. The Catholic church of St. Peter and Paul was founded in 1752, and reconstructed in 1806. The first school was opened in 1826. Prior to World War I, the village was inhabited by Šokci (Ethnic Croats), Hungarians, Germans and Roma, and during the war the locals were mobilized into the Austro-Hungarian Army.

== Demographics ==
=== Historical population ===
- 1961: 4,560
- 1971: 4,590
- 1981: 4,432
- 1991: 4,205
- 2002: 3,920
- 2011: 3,425
- 2022: 2,647

=== Ethnic groups ===
According to data from the 2022 census, ethnic groups in the village include:

- 1,384 (52.3%) Croats
- 448 (16.9%) Roma
- 245 (9.2%) Serbs
- 89 (3.3%) Hungarians
- Others/Undeclared/Unknown

== Features ==
Bački Monoštor is located on a small peninsula surrounded by the Danube backwaters and channels that can be reached only by passing over the bridges - hence the name "Village on the 7 Danube." A bridge is placed at the entrance to the village from the direction of Sombor - the so-called "Pislin bridge" which is on the Grand Bačka Canal, the other is at the entrance to the village from the direction of Bezdan - pontoon bridge, also over the Grand Canal and the third is placed at the southwestern side of the village over Canal Danube-Tisa-Danube, so called "Gypsy bridge" that connects Bački Monoštor with his woods and cottage settlements. Previously, there was another bridge in the district near monoštorski road to Sombor, set over the Grand Canal which connected the former estates and farms to the main road, but was destroyed during World War II.

There are also marked cycling routes - the via pacis Panonie.

As for coming to Bački Monoštor by water, it is the most popular because it offers the possibility of enjoying the countless natural beauty and the surrounding villages. In the past, the not so distant, Bački Monoštor had a so-called Danube port for barge and small boats. With the arrival of modern times, regulation of the Danube river channel and construction of defensive embankments for flood protection, the village was temporarily paralyzed the flow of the Danube, so called. Here is located one of the branches of the Danube, called Dunavac, which is now somewhat farther away from the village.

The program of revitalizing the Special Nature Reserve "Gornje Podunavlje" will provide training and a series of Shaft of the Danube for navigation of boats and ships, both in the economic, as well as the purpose of development of rural tourism and tourism in general.

== See also ==
- List of places in Serbia
- List of cities, towns and villages in Vojvodina

== Sources ==
- Slobodan Ćurčić, Broj stanovnika Vojvodine, Novi Sad, 1996.
