= Order of Duke Trpimir =

Order of Duke Trpimir with Neck Badge and Morning Star
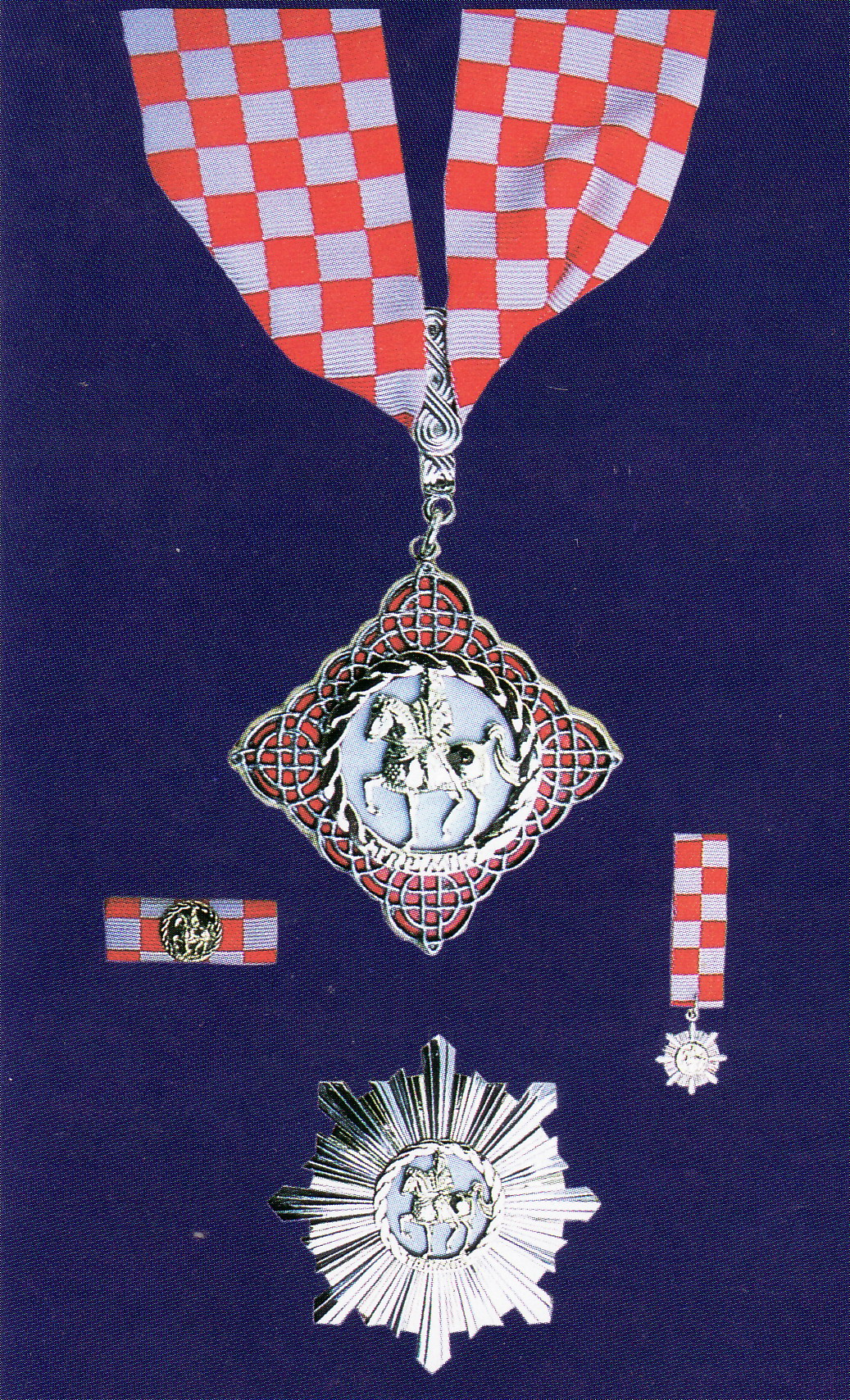
- Order of Duke Trpimir (top: Order Neck Badge; bottom: Morning Star (Danica) medal; left: Grand Order ribbon; right: smaller decorative version)
- Awarded for: Exceptional contributions to the independence, integrity and international reputation of the Republic of Croatia, the construction of Croatia, and development of relationships between Croatia and other countries.
- Country: Republic of Croatia
- Presented by: the President of Croatia
- Eligibility: Croatian and foreign ministerial level officials and others highly ranked officials
- Status: Currently awarded
- Established: 1 April 1995
- Ribbon bar of the order

Precedence
- Next (higher): Grand Order of Franjo Tuđman
- Next (lower): Order of Duke Branimir

The Order of Duke Trpimir (Croatian: Red kneza Trpimira), or more fully the Order of Duke Trpimir with Neck Badge and Morning Star (Red kneza Trpimira s ogrlicom i Danicom), is an order of the Republic of Croatia. It ranks sixth in the Croatian order of precedence after the Grand Order of King Dmitar Zvonimir. It is awarded to Croatian and foreign ministerial level officials and others for merit in contributing to the independence, integrity and international reputation of the Republic of Croatia, the construction of Croatia, and development of relationships between Croatia and other countries.

== Description ==
The badge of the order is a diamond-shaped red-enameled badge featuring an interwoven wattle pattern in silver, with a round white-enameled disk in the center, bordered in silver. On the disk is an equestrian representation of Duke Trpimir, a medieval Prince of Dalmatia and Duke of Croats. On the lower part of the silver border is the name "TRPIMIR".

The star of the order features the center medallion as above, but with a gilt rather than silver border, on a star with eight longer and eight shorter silver rays, with gold rays between.

== Notable recipients ==
- Krešimir Balenović
- Ante Bauer
- Luka Bebić – Speaker of the Croatian Parliament (2008–2011)
- Ante Beljo
- Andreas Berlakovich
- Sonja Biserko – Serbian compaigner for human rights, founder and president of the Helsinki Committee for Human Rights in Serbia
- Bogić Bogićević – representative of Bosnia and Herzegovina in the Presidency of Yugoslavia from 1989 to 1991
- Niko Bulić
- Zdravka Bušić – Croatian nationalist activist, member of the Croatian National Resistance, sister of convicted hijacker Zvonko Bušić
- Ivan Čermak – General who fought in the Croatian War of Independence
- Hikmet Çetin – Turkish politician
- Wesley Clark – U.S. general and Supreme Allied Commander, Europe during the Kosovo War
- Giulio Einaudi – first Apostolic Nuncio to Croatia
- Ingo Friedrich (2006) – German Member of the European Parliament and then-Vice President of the European Parliament.
- Peter Galbraith – first Ambassador of the United States to Croatia
- Ivica Gaži
- Hans Dietrich Genscher – German politician
- Philip Hannan – Archbishop of New Orleans
- Marijan Hanžeković
- Katica Ivanišević – Croatian politician
- Josip Juras
- Franjo Kajfež
- Ćiril Kos
- Ivan Lacković-Croata – Croatian painter
- Sveto Letica – first commander of the Croatian Navy
- Branko Lustig – Film producer
- Jozo Martinović
- Zlatko Mateša – Prime Minister of Croatia (1995–2000)
- Hans Mayer – German literary scholar
- Branko Mikša – Croatian politician and football official
- Ivica Mudrinić
- Hasan Muratović
- Vinko Nikolić – Ustaše official and poet
- Klaus Nöldner, president of CARE International Deutschland (Germany)
- Slobodan Novak – Croatian writer
- Doris Pack – German politician
- Ivo Parać
- Josip Pavlišić
- Marijan Petrović
- Jadranko Prlić – Prime Minister of the Croatian Republic of Herzeg-Bosnia, convicted of war crimes and crimes against humanity by the ICTY
- Ivan Rabuzin – Croatian artist
- Adalbert Rebić
- Ivo Rojnica – Ustaše official, businessman and political representative
- Ivo Sanader – Prime Minister of Croatia (2003–2009) – revoked
- Milovan Šibl
- Haris Silajdžić (1995) – Prime Minister of the Republic of Bosnia and Herzegovina
- Borislav Škegro
- Kazimir Sviben
- Smiljko Sokol
- Dragutin Tadijanović – Croatian poet
- Miroslav Tuđman – Son of the first President of Croatia, Franjo Tuđman
- Anton Tus – First Chief of the General Staff of the Croatian Armed Forces

The order is also typically awarded to foreign ambassadors.
