= Mara Švel-Gamiršek =

Croatian writer and poet

Mara Švel-Gamiršek, also known as Mara Schwell (3 January 1900 – 7 December 1975) was a Croatian writer from Syrmia. Beside prose, she also wrote poetry.

== Early life and education ==
Mara Švel-Gamiršek was born in Sremska Mitrovica, Kingdom of Croatia-Slavonia, Kingdom of Hungary, Austria-Hungary (today Vojvodina, Serbia), 3 January 1900, in the family of Šokci Croats.

She attended the elementary school in Sremska Mitrovica. She continued her education in gymnasium in Sušak, and after that, she went to study medicine. She didn't complete her medical degree as she married.

== Career ==
From 1923, she turned to her literary work. Later, she moved to Zagreb.

She began publishing her works in early 1940s, at Matica hrvatska. Already then, her works were drawing attention from readers. Being Šokica herself, she has described the life of Šokci Croats in her books. In wider sense, she belonged to the phenomenon of žensko šokačko pismo ("female literature of Šokci"). She was the working with magazine Hrvatska revija, publishing some of her poetry in it in 1976.

== Death and legacy ==
She died in Zagreb, 7 December 1975. The elementary school in Vrbanja, in eastern Croatia, is named after Mara Švel-Gamiršek.

== Works ==
- Šuma i Šokci, 1940
- Hrast, Zagreb, 1942
- Portreti nepoznatih žena, 1942
- Priče za Sveu i Karen, 1967
- Legende, 1969
- Izabrana djela, 1970
- Ovim šorom Jagodo, 1975
