= Slobodan Novak =

Croatian writer

- Born: Ante Slobodan Novak; 3 November 1924; Split, Kingdom of Serbs, Croats and Slovenes
- Died: 25 July 2016 (aged 91); Zagreb, Croatia
- Education: University of Zagreb
- Writing career
- Genre: Narrative novels
- Notable awards: Vladimir Nazor Award; Order of Duke Trpimir; Order of Danica Hrvatska with character of Marko Marulić

Ante Slobodan Novak (3 November 1924 – 25 July 2016) was a Croatian writer and novelist. He is best known for his novel Gold, Frankincense and Myrrh (1968), often listed as one of the best Croatian novels of the 20th century.

== Biography ==
Novak was born in Split on 3 November 1924 to Duje and Marija (née Smoje) Novak. He was baptized in the local church as Ante Slobodan Novak. He finished elementary school in Rab, attended the Classical gymnasium in Split, then graduated in Sušak. During World War II he joined the Yugoslav Partisans, which he described in his autobiographical essays Digresije and Protimbe (2003).

He then attended the University of Zagreb and earned a degree in Croatian and Yugoslav literature in 1953. He worked as an instructor, proofreader, and playwright for the Croatian National Theatre in Split. Later he worked as a journalist and an editor in various publishing houses. In 1983 he became a member of the Croatian Academy of Sciences and Arts. On 27 July 1999, Novak was declared an Honorary Citizen of Rab. He died in Zagreb on 25 July 2016.

== Literary work ==
He started his career with songs full of painful memories from the war. Verses were gathered in his work Glasnice u oluji (English: Vocal Cords in a Storm) (1950). Soon he started to write fiction: he published Krugovima (English: Circles) and Republici (English: Republic). He gained the attention of critics and the public by publishing his autobiographical novel Izgubljeni zavičaj (English: Lost homeland) (1955), in which he dealt with his childhood on a lonely island.

The narrator appears in two characters: in infantile “I” where he observes, registers and absorbs everything around him; and the second character as today's “I” where he, with a sentimental and quiet dose of resignation, recreates his memories and images from youth. His novel Mirisi, zlato i tamjan (English: Gold, Frankincense and Myrrh) was published in 1968. This is a story about a retired middle-aged intellectual who lives with his wife on an isolated island; he lives his life and nurtures the very old Madona Markantunova, a former rich patrician woman and owner of half of the island. The story takes place in the 1960s. Novak follows the same thematic and poetic line in his short novel Izvanbrodski dnevnik (English: Outboard Diary) published in 1977.

Later, Novak published a collection of interviews with Jelena Hekman in Digresije (English: Digressions) in 2001. He later published Protimbe (English: Dissent) (2003) which he considered as an expansion of Digresije. Protimbe is one of the greatest works of Croatian autobiographical prose, rich with reminiscences and associations on youth, political and social life in SFR Yugoslavia, on the writer's experiences during the Croatian War of Independence, and on subsequent changes politically and socially.

== Works ==
In Croatian	In English	Publication
Glasnice u oluji	Vocal Cords in a Storm	Zagreb, 1950
Izgubljeni zavičaj	Lost Homeland	Split, 1954
Trofej	Trophy	Zagreb, 1960
Tvrdi grad	Fortified Town	Zagreb, 1961
Mirisi, zlato i tamjan	Gold, Frankincense and Myrrh	Zagreb, 1968
Dolutali metak	Roamed Bullet	Zagreb, 1969
Izvanbrodski dnevnik	Outboard Diary	Zagreb, 1977
Tri putovanja	Three Travels	Zagreb, 1977
Južne misli	Southern Thoughts	Zagreb, 1990
Digresije	Digressions	Zagreb, 2001
Protimbe	Dissents	Zagreb, 2003
Pristajanje	Docking	Zagreb, 2005

== Awards and decorations ==
=== Awards ===
Award	Awarded for	Year of reception
Award of the City of Zagreb	Novel: Lost Homeland	1955
Award of the City of Zagreb	Novel: Said Town	1962
Award of Yugoslav Festival of Radio-Drama in Novi Sad	For Best radio-drama work: Maestro, how are you doing?	1966
NIN Award	For Best Yugoslav Novel of the Year: Gold, Frankincense and Myrrh	1968
Concours international du drame radiophonique Praha-Warszawa-Zagreb	For radio-drama: Curved Space	1968
Vladimir Nazor Award	Novel of the year: Gold, Frankincense and Myrrh	1969
Award of Matica hrvatska	Novel of the year Gold, Frankincense and Myrrh	1969
Critics Award of Večernji list	Book of the year:Gold, Frankincense and Myrrh	1969
Vladimir Nazor Award	For lifetime achievement	1990
Award of Vjesnik	Novel: Gold, Frankincense and Myrrh	1994
Miroslav Krleža Award of Croatian Writers' Association	Not specified	2005
August Šenoa Award of Matica hrvatska	Novel: Docking	2005
Emanuel Vidović Award of Slobodna Dalmacija	For lifetime achievement	2005

=== Decorations ===
Decoration	Image
Order of Duke Trpimir	
Order of Danica Hrvatska with the face of Marko Marulić	

== Sources ==
- (in Croatian) HAZU - Biography
- Visković, Velimir (April 2006). "Inzularnost kao metafora i zbilja". Dani Hvarskoga kazališta (in Croatian). 32 (1): 394–407.
