= Bački Breg =

Bački Breg Бачки Брег (Serbian) Bereg (Croatian) Béreg (Hungarian)
- Village (Selo)
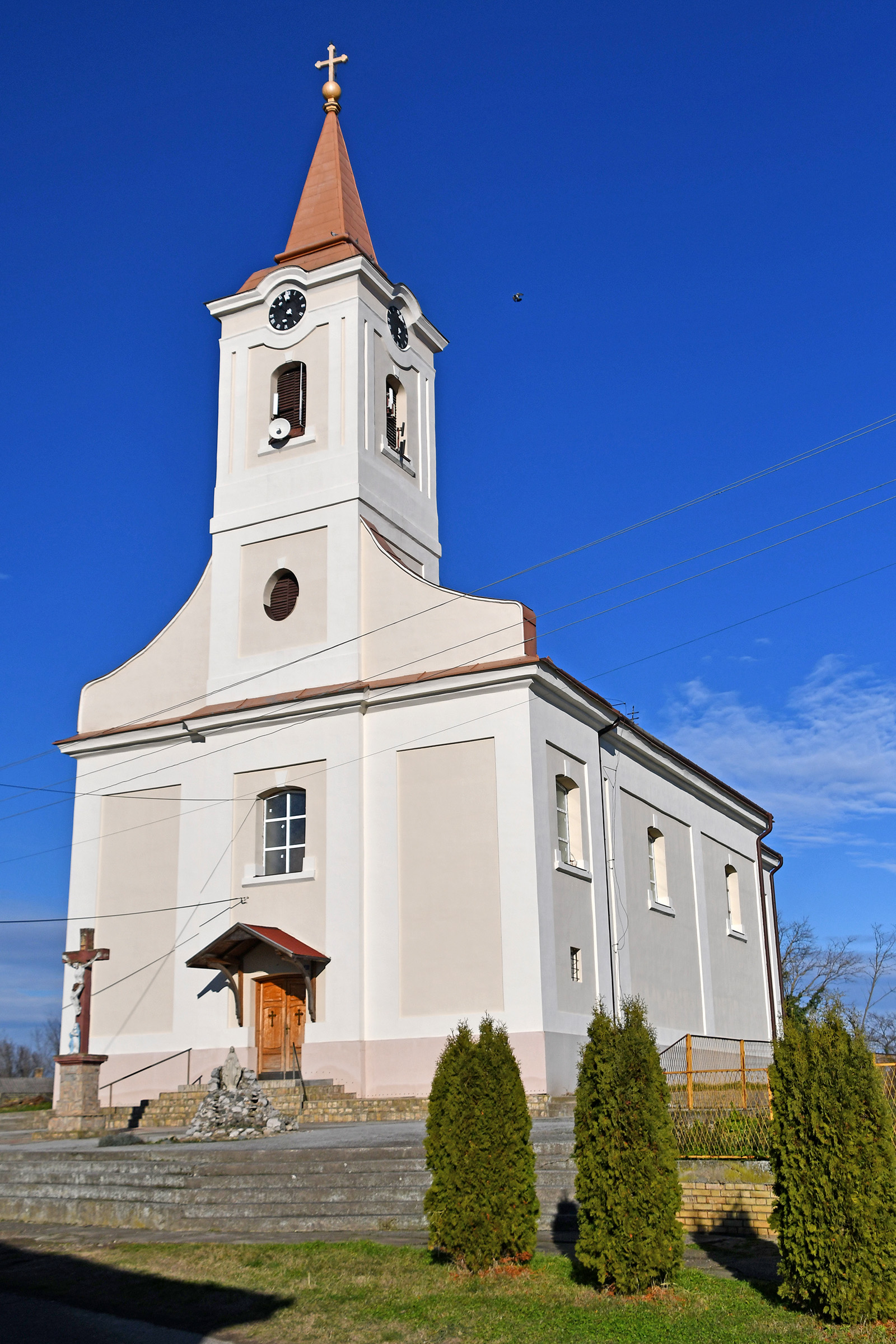
- Saint Michael the Archangel Catholic Church.

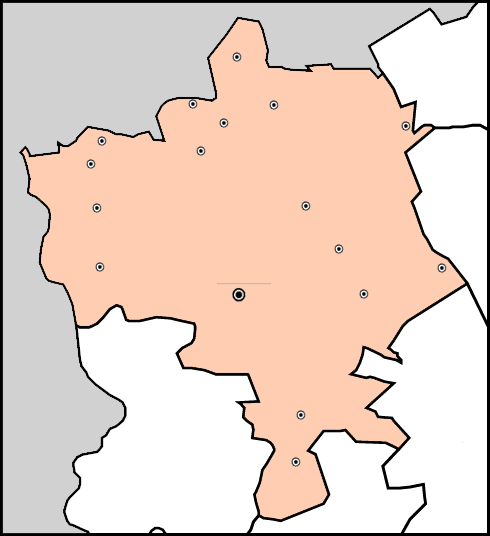

- Location within Vojvodina Location within Serbia Location within Europe
- Coordinates: 45°55′N 18°56′E
- Country: Serbia
- Province: Vojvodina
- Region: Bačka (Podunavlje)
- District: West Bačka
- Municipality: Sombor

Area
  - Total: 52.55 km^{2} (20.29 sq mi)
- Elevation: 92 m (302 ft)

Population (2022)
  - Total: 769
  - Density: 14.6/km^{2} (37.9/sq mi)
- Time zone: UTC+1 (CET)
  - Summer (DST): UTC+2 (CEST)

Bački Breg (Serbian Cyrillic: Бачки Брег, Croatian: Bereg, Hungarian: Béreg) is a village located in the Sombor municipality, West Bačka District, Vojvodina, Serbia. It has a population of 769 inhabitants (2022 census).

Bački Breg is in the northwesternmost corner of Serbia.

== Name ==
In Serbian the village is known as Bački Breg or Бачки Брег, in Croatian as Bereg (since 2009) or Bački Breg (before 2009), in Hungarian as Béreg, and in German as Bereg.

== History ==
It was first mentioned in 1319. In 1620, the village was settled by Šokci who originating from Klis near Split. The first church in the village was founded in 1740. In the 18th century, Germans and Hungarians settled here as well.

== Demographics ==
=== Historical population ===
- 1961: 2,045
- 1971: 2,006
- 1981: 1,770
- 1991: 1,585
- 2002: 1,388
- 2011: 1,140
- 2022: 769

=== Ethnic groups ===
According to data from the 2022 census, ethnic groups in the village include:

- 401 (52.1%) Croats
- 195 (25.3%) Serbs
- Others/Undeclared/Unknown

== See also ==
- List of places in Serbia
- List of cities, towns and villages in Vojvodina
