= Argentine arms trafficking scandal =

Scandal in Argentina

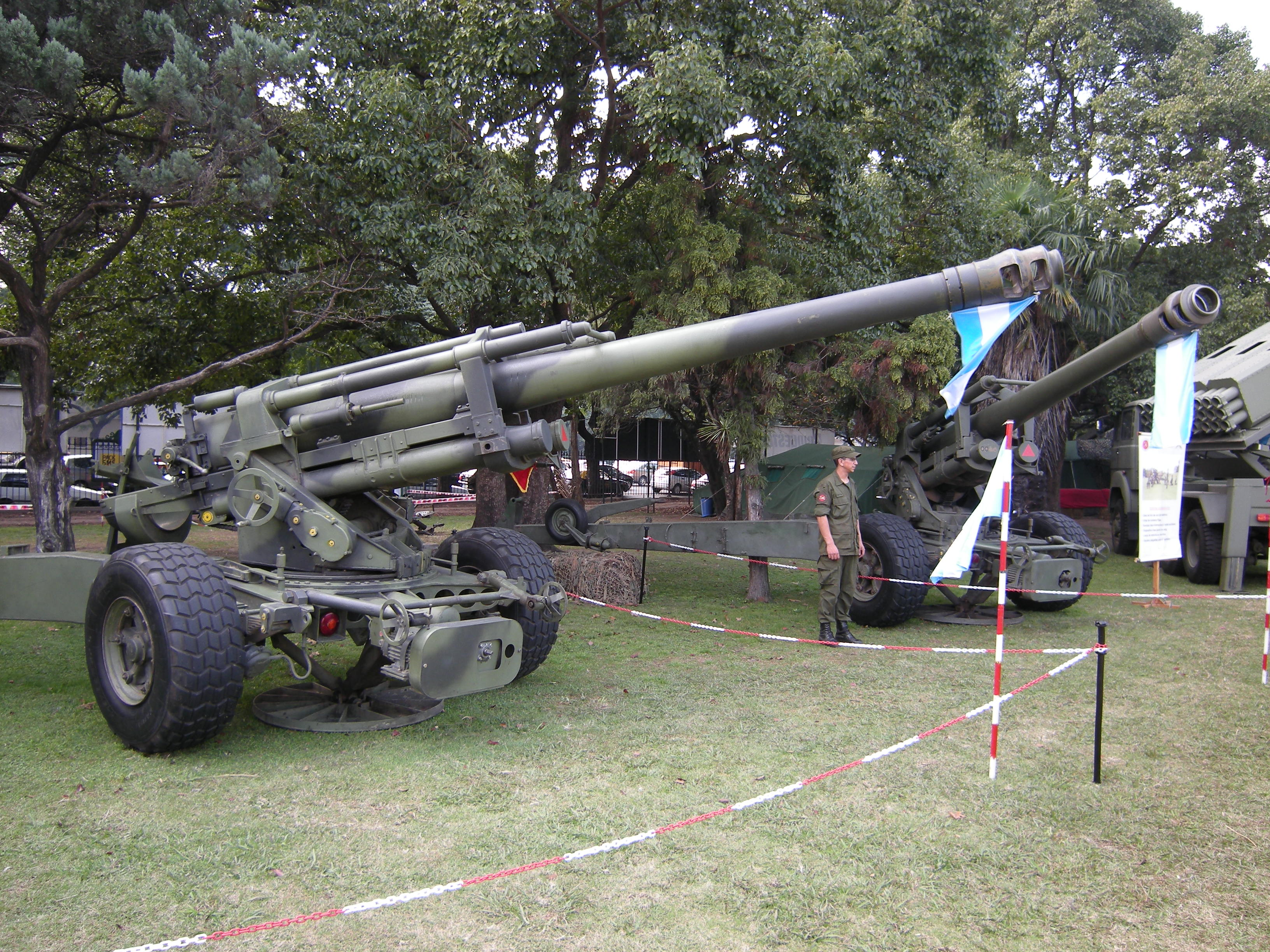
CITER L33 155mm cannon. Argentina sent about 40 of them to Croatia, Bosnia and Ecuador.

The Argentine arms trafficking scandal involved illegal arms shipments of 6,500 tonnes (6,400 long tons; 7,200 short tons) of weapons and ammunition from Argentina to Croatia and Ecuador between 1991 and 1995. At the time of the shipments, Croatia was under a United Nations arms embargo, and Argentina was prohibited from selling weapons to Ecuador under the terms of a peace agreement signed in 1942.

== History ==
The sale of weapons to Ecuador took place in the midst of that country's brief armed conflict with Peru in early 1995. The scandal was very important in Argentina because they were among the four official guarantors of peace of the Treaty of Rio de Janeiro, which breached its international commitments under law. It also damaged relations with longtime ally Peru, which had peaked during the 1982 Falklands War, when Peru had sent weapons, fighter planes and soldiers to aid Argentina against Great Britain.

Shipments to Croatia began in 1991, when Argentine president Carlos Menem signed two secret decrees, endorsed by several ministers. The shipments continued from 1993 until 1995, when Menem affixed his signature to a third secret decree for the same purpose. Scholar Paul Hockenos identifies Ivo Rojnica, a collaborationist official in Croatia's World War II puppet government who subsequently escaped to Argentina, as a key intermediary between Menem and the Croatian authorities.

According to the first two decrees, weapons were originally destined for Panama, and after the third decree in 1995, to Venezuela. None of these countries had ordered weapons from Argentina before; at that time Panama also lacked a proper army after the 1989 United States invasion of Panama. Most of the weapons were diverted to Croatia which was in the midst of war with Yugoslavia, with the rest shipped to Ecuador in 1995.

Seven shipments were carried by ship to Croatia; the first shipment comprised military equipment produced by Fabricaciones Militares (Dirección General de Fabricaciones Militares or DGFM - Government Military Industries), prominently including FAL rifles. The six other shipments contained surplus weapons from regular army units including 155 mm cannons, gunpowder, and Italian Oto Melara howitzers. Argentina offered the weapons as refurbished, which Croatia accepted.

It was estimated that a total of 6500 tons of trafficked weapons and ammunition were smuggled. Some army serial numbers and Argentine insignia were removed from some of the weapons at the military factory in Rio Tercero before they were shipped. This factory was later destroyed in a sabotage action intended to remove evidence; the resulting sabotage destroyed a large part of the city, causing several deaths. Most of the witnesses in the ensuing trial for the explosion have since died in bizarre accidents.

== Arrests ==
The confession of the former Controller of Fabricaciones Militares, Luis Sarlenga, which prompted federal judge Jorge Urso to order the house arrest of Carlos Menem in June 2001. Six months later, the Supreme Court issued a controversial acquittal where the former president was released.

In 2007, Menem was prosecuted again by the economic criminal judge Rafael Caputo; Menem was prohibited from leaving the country and a court order was issued to seize his property. Despite this, the former president is protected by legislative privileges related to his status as a senator from the province of La Rioja. Former economic minister Domingo Cavallo, former Defense Minister Oscar Camilion, and former Air Force Brigadier Juan Paulik were also implicated in this trial.

== See also ==
- Cenepa War
- Río Tercero explosion
- 1992 attack on Israeli embassy in Buenos Aires
- 1994 AMIA bombing
