= Tomislav Sunić =

Croatian-American activist and academic (born 1953)

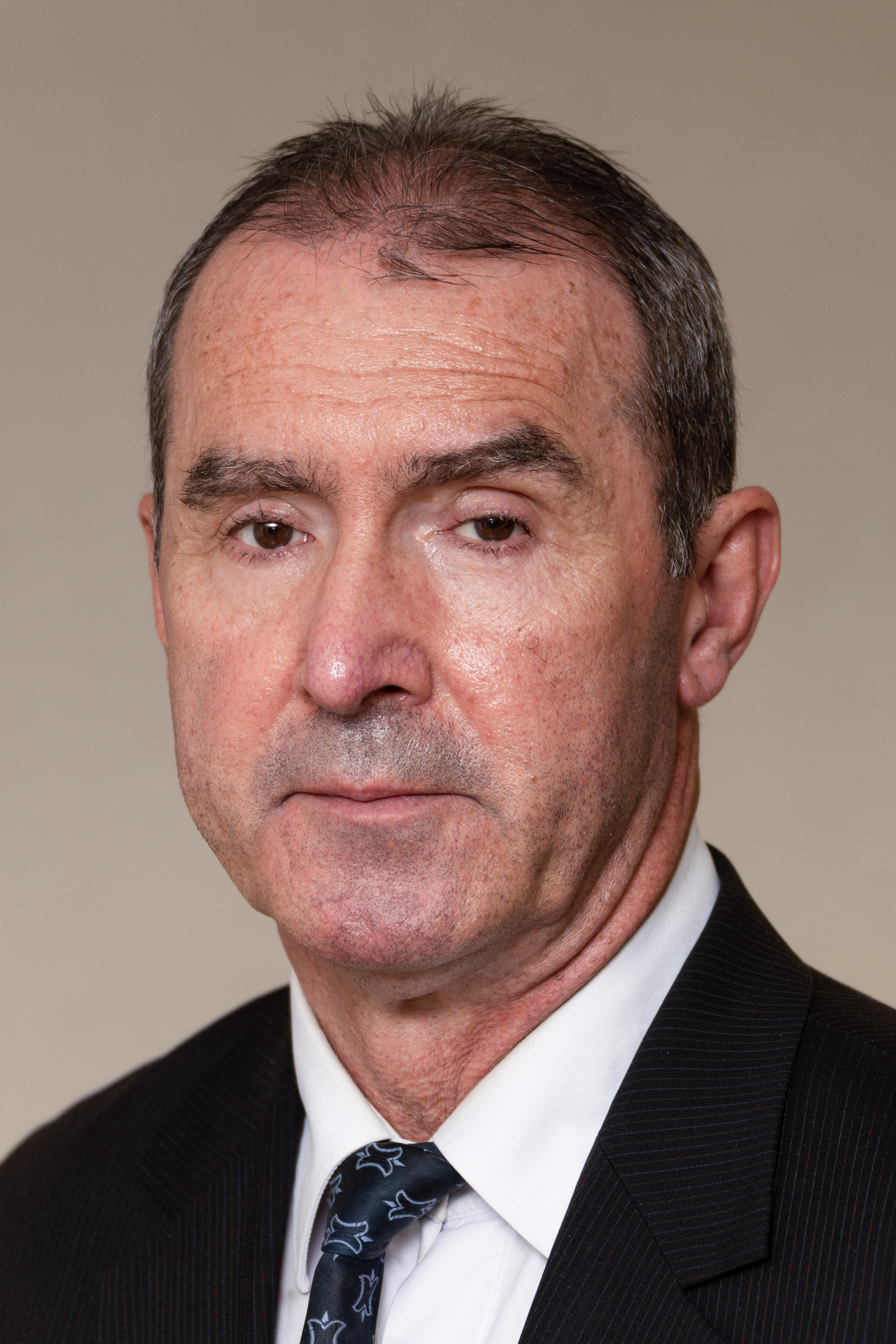
- Tomislav Sunić, 2018
- Born: February 3, 1953 (age 73); Zagreb, PR Croatia, FPR Yugoslavia
- Other name: Tom Sunic
- Citizenship: Croatia and United States
- Education: University of California, Santa Barbara
- Known for: Politico-cultural activism
- Scientific career
- Fields: Political science, sociology of culture
- Workplaces: Formerly professor at California State University, University of California, Juniata College; also former diplomat for the Croatian government

Tomislav Sunić (born February 3, 1953), sometimes known as Tom Sunic, is a Croatian-American political theorist, far-right activist and a former professor. His views are often cited as part of the European New Right.

== Biography ==
Sunić was born in Zagreb, SFR Yugoslavia (present-day Zagreb, Republic of Croatia) in 1953 to a Croatian Catholic family. He is a naturalized United States citizen.

His father, Mirko Sunić (1915–2008) was a lawyer in communist Yugoslavia, who, along with Tomislav's sister, Mirna Sunić, were "prisoners of conscience". The two were charged with creating "hostile propaganda", under Article 133 of the Yugoslav Criminal Code, and the court sentenced them to 4 and 1 years of prison respectively. Mirko Sunić was championed by Amnesty International and 15 United States congressmen in 1985), Mirko Sunić authored, in 1996, Moji inkriminirani zapisi ("My incriminating records").

Tomislav Sunić studied French and English Language and Literature at the University of Zagreb until 1978. From 1980 to 1982 he worked in Algeria as an interpreter for the Yugoslav-Croatian construction company Ingra. He emigrated to the United States, where he received a master's degree at California State University, Sacramento in 1985.

In June 1987, at the invitation of Freedom House, Sunić and Mate Meštrović, along with twelve other émigré academics and dissidents from different Yugoslav constituent republics, were invited to discuss the political crisis in Yugoslavia. Sunić, who participated in the discussion, gave a short speech on Communist repression in Yugoslavia and what he described as the activities of the Yugoslav secret police, the UDBA.

Tomislav Sunić received a doctorate in political science in 1988 from the University of California, Santa Barbara. During his graduate studies he lobbied for Croatian prisoners in Yugoslavia and wrote for the émigré Croat London-based biweekly Nova Hrvatska and the Madrid-based Croat literary quarterly Hrvatska Revija (meaning "Croatian Review") (Revista Croata). From 1988 to 1993, he taught at California State University, the University of California, and Juniata College (Pennsylvania). From 1993 to 2001, he served in various diplomatic positions with the Croatian government in Zagreb, London, Copenhagen, and Brussels. He taught at the Anglo-American College in Prague, and currently resides in Zagreb, where he works as a freelance writer.

Sunić's books and views can be described as being in the style of the GRECE, a school of thought by Alain de Benoist, who wrote a preface to Sunić's book and whose articles Sunić often translates into English. Sunić has widely written, translated and lectured in English, German, French and Croatian on many authors, novelists and political thinkers who can be called the predecessors of the European New Right (such as Southern Agrarians, Emile Cioran, Ernst Jünger and Louis-Ferdinand Céline) The "European New Right," or Nouvelle Droite, is a name for various forms of conservative, right-wing, or dissident cultural movements and political groupings which emerged in opposition to the liberal and leftist academic milieu of the mid- to late-20th century. Critics have argued that de Benoist has developed a novel cultural fascism and have depicted the advocates of Sunić's school of thought as "literary fascists".

Evolutionary psychologist Kevin B. MacDonald wrote an introduction to Sunić's book Homo Americanus, a book which deals extensively with the Judeo-Christian mindset and its secular modalities in the USA. MacDonald states the work "addresses the modern world of hyper-liberalism, globalist capitalism and the crisis of our inherited Indo-European civilization". Sunić is critical of Judeo-Christian monotheism, to which he attributes the rise of communism and liberalism.

Sunić has been critical of post-World War II legislative changes in Europe, regarding non-white immigration and restrictions on freedom of speech. He has attended and spoken at some conferences organized and attended by historical revisionists. He lectured on Carl Schmitt, a German legal scholar, who was influential in Nazi Germany. Sunić's articles have been published in American, French, German and Croatian journals, including the now defunct Journal of Historical Review. In August 2003, he gave a lecture in German at a conference sponsored by Germany's National Democratic Party of Germany alongside Horst Mahler.

== Speaking appearances ==
Sunić has accepted invitations to speak before radical conservatives, white nationalist academics and individuals and groups accused of holding or promoting racist and anti-Semitic views. He spoke at the 2002 and 2003 'Eurofest' events, sponsored by the Sacramento chapter of National Alliance, where he gave a speech, "'Turkish Onslaught to Europe to Communist Disaster', which was critical of non-European immigration.

In his books, articles and speeches Sunić critically examines modern higher education and different antiracist and antifascist institutions which he describes as a platform for "semantic distortions of political concepts, in order to "demonize or discredit non-conformist, nationalist and traditionalist schools of thought."

Sunić spoke to the French Senate on 15 January 2007, at a conference entitled "Nationalismes et religions dans les Balkans occidentaux" (Nationalisms and Religions in the Western Balkans), sponsored by the Foundation Robert Schuman. The topic of his talk was "Facteur nationaliste et facteur religieux dans les tensions actuelles" ("The Nationalist and Religious Factor in the Present Tensions"). Other speakers included Michel Barnier (former French Minister of Foreign Affairs) and General David Leakey (former Commander of EUFOR in Bosnia-Herzegovina).

Sunić held a speech in Sweden at the neo-nazi festival "Nordiska Festivalen" in 2008. He has also spoken at a British far-right meeting for "Generation Identity". Sunic also held a speech at another extreme right wing conference in 2011 called "Identitär Idé" ("Identitarian Idea").

A June 2011 conference tour was with MacDonald, in Sweden, where they both talked about the topic "Individualism and Nationalism in the Modern Multicultural Society". He spoke at the "Forgotten Genocide" International Conference, held in St. Louis Community College (St.Louis, Missouri), on "The Fate of the Danube Germans in Yugoslavia in the Wake of WWII". In July 2011, he was a guest speaker in Knin, Croatia, at the summer school of the Flemish separatist, rightist political party, Vlaams Belang, where he lectured on the parallels between multicultural Belgium and multicultural Yugoslavia.

Sunić is a frequent guest of ethnic or expatriate German and Croatian community or social groups in North America, Australia and Europe, where he talks about what he alleges were mass killings of ethnic German and Croat civilians in the former Yugoslavia and in Eastern Europe in the aftermath of WWII. More recently, Sunić spoke at two National Policy Institute gatherings in 2011 and 2013.

== Radio programme ==
From 2 June 2009 until 2012, Sunić hosted a radio show with the Voice of Reason Broadcast Network. Topics he addressed included race, culture, nationalism, and politics. The show, which began as The New Nationalist Perspective, was later renamed The Sunic Journal. It ended in 2012.

== TV Appearances ==
Sunić is occasionally interviewed by television station Z1, and is a recurring guest on its flagship political program Bujica. As of 2024, he is the regular foreign policy analyst for Croatian State broadcaster HRT 4.

== Books ==
- Homo Americanus: Ein Kind der Postmoderne (Vorwort Kevin MacDonald) (2025)
- Homo Americanus: Lineamenti antropologici e sociologici (2025)
- Извештај о смрти Европе (2024)
- Против демократии и равенства (2024)
- POSMRTNI IZVJEŠTAJ (2021)
- Homo Americanus: Child of the Postmodern Age (2018)
- Postmortem Report: Cultural Examinations from Postmodernity, preface Kevin MacDonald (2017)
- Titans are in Town: A Novella and Accompanying Essays (2017)
- La Nueva Derecha Europea (1ª edición, Tarragona) (2014)
- Nieuw Rechts. Voor een andere politieke cultuur (Belgium: Uitgeverij iD) (2014)
- Chroniques des Temps Postmodernes (2014)
- Against Democracy and Equality: The European New Right (2011)
- La Croatie: un pays par défaut? (June 2010)
- Homo americanus: Child of the Postmodern Age (June 2007)
- Fragmenti metapolitike ( Zagreb: K. Kresimir) (1998)
- Titoism and Dissidence; Studies in the History and Dissolution of Communist Yugoslavia (1995)
