= Dragočaj =

Dragočaj Драгочај (Serbian)
- Village (Selo)
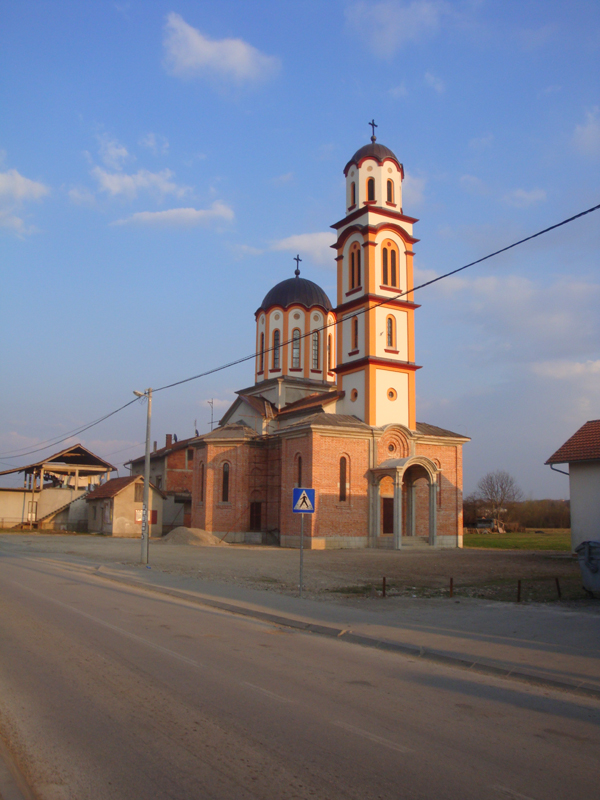
- Serbian Orthodox church in Dragočaj

- Location within Bosnia and Herzegovina
- Coordinates: 44°51′17″N 17°09′36″E
- Country: Bosnia and Herzegovina
- Entity: Republika Srpska
- Municipality: Banja Luka

Population (2013)
  - Total: 2,371
- Time zone: UTC+1 (CET)
  - Summer (DST): UTC+2 (CEST)

Dragočaj (Serbian Cyrillic: Драгочај) is a village in the municipality of Banja Luka, Republika Srpska, Bosnia and Herzegovina.

== Demographics ==
Ethnic groups in the village include:

- 2,151 Serbs (90.72%)
- 141 Croats (5.95%)
- 79 Others (3.33%)
