= Ilija Okrugić =

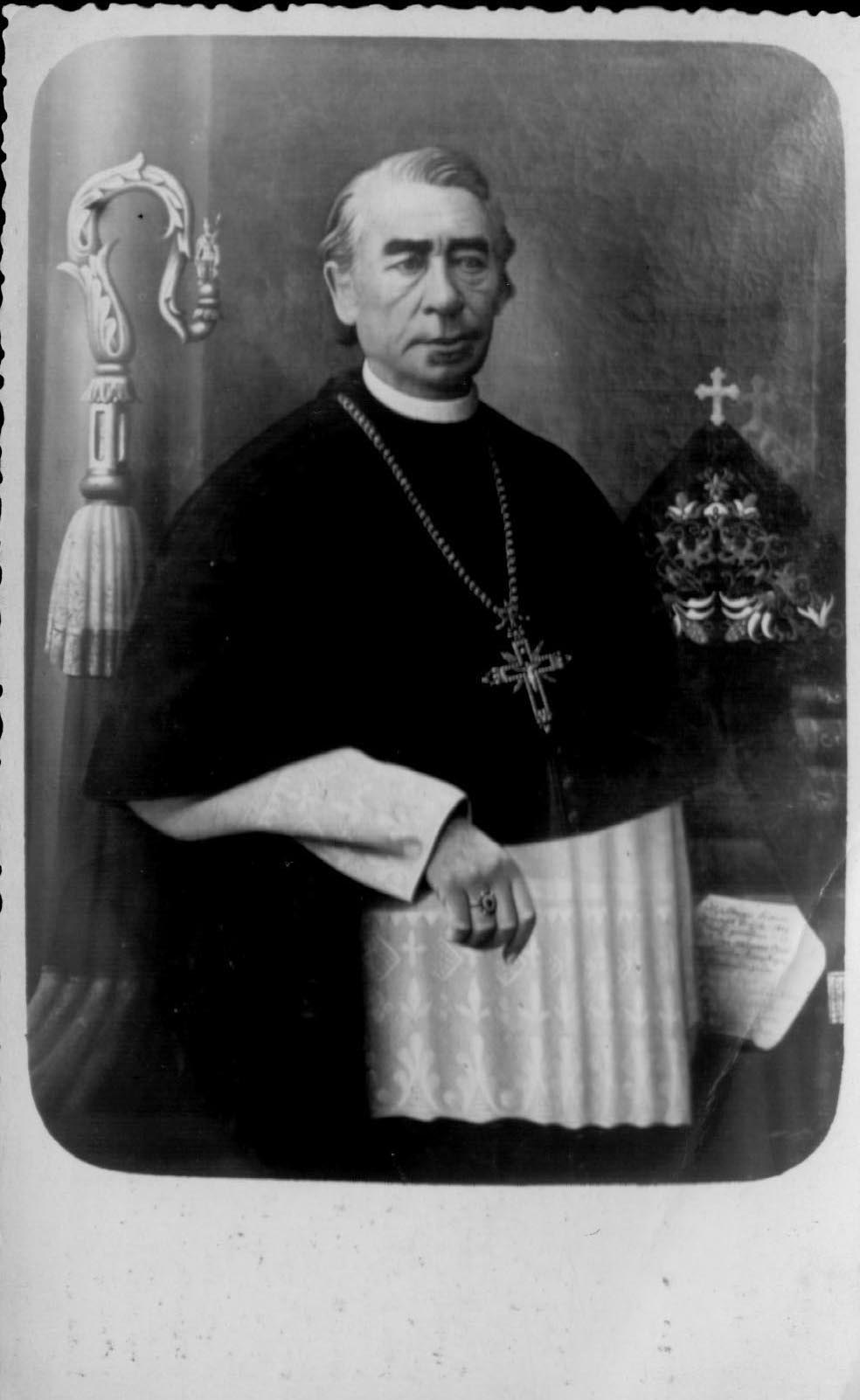
Ilija Okrugić

Ilija Okrugić-Sr(i)emac (May 12, 1827, Sremski Karlovci - May 30, 1897, Petrovaradin) was a Croatian poet and playwright from Syrmia, one of members of Illyrian movement and a Catholic priest.

== Biography ==
Ilija Okrugić was born in Sremski Karlovci (Military Frontier, part of Habsburg monarchy), in the family that worked in administration.

He went to elementary school in Sremski Karlovci, and studied theology later in Đakovo (in the Kingdom of Croatia-Slavonia, part of Habsburg monarchy).

Bishop Josip Juraj Strossmayer ordained him as a priest. Okrugić was in the first generation of the priests that Strossmayer ordained, so they remained in more friendly relations, that reflected in Okrugić's works.

He served as chaplain and vicar in various places in Syrmia and Slavonia; in Zemun, Kukujevci, Sot, Sarvaš, Levanjska Varoš, also was a prebendar in Đakovo, in the major church of the bishopric.

The last phase of his service was in Petrovaradin (then in Military Frontier, part of Austrian Empire to 1867 and later Austria-Hungary), from 1866 till his death. He had a title of abbot of St. Demetrius.

He worked with in Zora dalmatinska of Ante Kuzmanić and Danica ilirska of Ljudevit Gaj (there Okrugić published his poetry and historical discussions), but also in other Croatian press.
