= Vinko Nikolić =

Croatian writer and poet

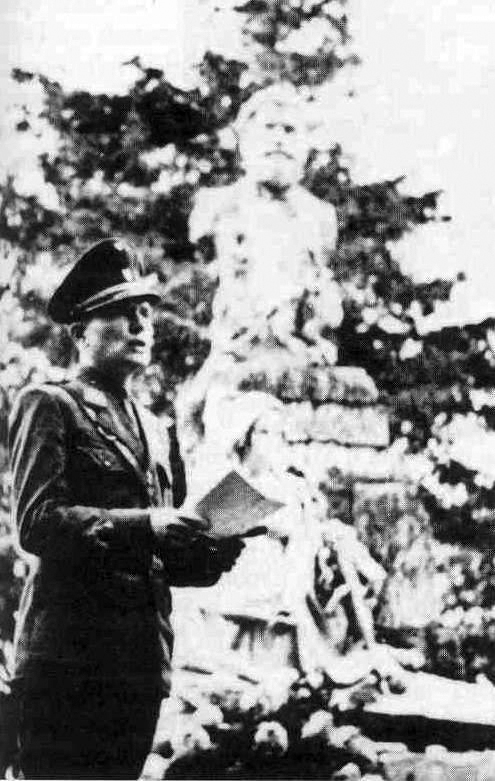
- Vinko Nikolić holding a speech at the grave of Ante Starčević
- Born: 2 March 1912; Šibenik, Dalmatia, Austria-Hungary
- Died: 12 July 1997 (aged 85); Šibenik, Croatia
- Education: University of Zagreb
- Occupations: Writer, poet, journalist
- Writing career
- Language: Croatian
- Genre: Poetry
- Notable awards: Order of Duke Trpimir

Vinko Nikolić (2 March 1912 – 12 July 1997) was a Croatian writer, poet and journalist, and a high-ranking official in the Independent State of Croatia (NDH). After the downfall of NDH, he emigrated to Buenos Aires, Argentina, where he lived in exile until returning to Croatia, several years before his death.

== Biography ==
Vinko Nikolić was born in Šibenik on 2 March 1912. He attended elementary school and Catholic gymnasium in his birth town. He joined the Faculty of Philosophy of the University of Zagreb and graduated in 1937.

As a professor at the Commercial Academy he saw political changes in Yugoslavia in 1939, the most significant of which was the creation of Banovina Croatia. For much of World War II he was an adjutant at Supreme Ustaša Headquarters. Supreme Ustaša Headquarters directed the operation of the Independent State of Croatia.

At the end of World War II he retreated to Austria with the rest of the Ustaša army and civilians. During his stay in Austria he gained status as a prisoner of war, and left for another camp in Italy. During his transfer to the other camp, he jumped out of a train. To avoid extradition to Yugoslavia, Nikolić went to Buenos Aires, Argentina, arriving there on 8 June 1947.

At first he lived in an old house with Ante Pavelić. He worked as a journalist, and along with Franjo Nevistić, he published the magazine Hrvatska which he edited until June 1950. In the same year, along with Antun Bonifačić, he published the Croatian emigrant magazine Hrvatska revija, which he edited from the first published issue of magazine in 1951 until his death.

He edited other Croatian emigrant magazines, including Ave, Hrvatski vitez (Croatian knight), Oganj (Flame), Novi život (New life), Za Boga i Hrvatsku (For God and Croatia), Danica, La Croatie, Osoba i duh (Person and spirit), Islam, Glasnik društva Muslimana Austrije (Herald of Muslims of Austria), Hrvatski radnik (Croatian worker), Hrvatska gruda (Croatian land), Hrvatska sloboda (Croatian freedom) and Rakovica. After the fall of Yugoslavia, he returned to his birthplace of Šibenik. He was appointed by Croatian President Franjo Tudjman to the Croatian Parliament. He was a representative in the County Assembly in Croatian parliament, the president of the Croatian Heritage Foundation and the vice-president of the Croatian Cultural Foundation. He died on 12 July 1997 at the age of 85.

== Works ==
- Proljetna svitanja (Spring dawns), Zagreb, 1935
- Svijetli putovi (Lights and ways), Zagreb, 1939
- Moj grad (My town), Zagreb, 1941
- Oslobođeni žali (Free from regrets), Zagreb, 1943
- Duga nad porušenim mostovima: izabrane pjesme (Rainbow above destroyed bridges: chosen poems), chosen by Rajmund Kupareo, Buenos Aires, 1964
- Pred vratima domovine: susret s hrvatskom emigracijom 1965: dojmovi i razgovori (In front of fatherland: meetings with Croatian emigration 1965: impressions and conversations), Buenos Aires, 1966
- Gorak je zemje kruv (Bread is bitter because of land), München-Barcelona, 1977
- Povratak: izabrane pjesme (Return: selected poems), prepared by Božidar Petrač and Ivan Tolj, Zagreb, 1990
- Stepinac mu je ime. Zbornik uspomena, svjedočanstava i dokumenata (Stepinac is his name. Collection of memories, testimonies and documents), prepared by Vinko Nikolić, Zagreb, 1991. (First ed. München-Barcelona, knj. 1, 1978., knj. 2, 1980.)
- Opjevani grad (Singed town), Šibenik, 1994
- Tragedija se dogodila u svibnju: jedna (prva) godina egzila u dnevniku "ratnog" zarobljenika broj 324.664 (Tragedy occurred in May: one year of exile in a diary of the prisoner of war no. 324,644), Zagreb, 1995. (Prvo izd. Barcelona-München, 1984.)
- U službi domovine: studije, ogledi, portreti (In service of fatherland: studies, essays, portraits), prepared by Ivan Rodić, Zagreb, 1996

Posthumously:

- Izabrane pjesme (Selected poems), prepared by Cvjetko Milanja, Vinkovci, 1998.

== Awards ==
- 1995: Order of Duke Trpimir

== Bibliography ==
- Jandrić, Berislav (2003). "Stajališta Hrvatske političke emigracije o hrvatskom proljeću iznesena u najznačajnijem emigrantskom časopisu Hrvatskoj reviji". Časopis Za Suvremenu Povijest. 35 (2). Zagreb.
