= Hrvatska revija =

- Frequency: Quarterly
- Circulation: 1,500
- Publisher: Matica hrvatska
- First issue: 1928 (1st run); 1951 (2nd run); 2001 (present run)
- Country: Croatia
- Based in: Zagreb
- Language: Croatian
- ISSN: 1330-2493

Hrvatska revija (English: Croatian Review or HR) is a Croatian literary quarterly published by Matica hrvatska (MH) based in Zagreb.

== History and profile ==
The magazine's original run lasted between 1928 and 1945 when it was published by MH and during which it became a renowned literary and cultural magazine. The magazine was published regularly from 1929 onwards and its editor from 1930 was Blaž Jurišić. In 1932 Miroslav Krleža, August Cesarec and a group of younger left leaning authors left the magazine. The publication of the magazine came to an abrupt end in 1945 as the magazine was banned by the Yugoslav communist authorities following the end of World War II.

In 1951 it was re-established abroad in Buenos Aires, Argentina by Croatian émigrés Vinko Nikolić and Antun Bonifačić. Apart from literary pieces, the magazine started publishing memoir and travel writing as well as nonfiction. In 1966 the magazine moved to Europe and was published for a time in Paris, and then in Munich, before settling in Barcelona. During this time the magazine developed a following in the Croat émigré community and became one of its two most widely read magazines, along with the largely news-oriented bi-weekly Nova Hrvatska ("New Croatia") based in London.

Following the breakup of Yugoslavia and Croatia's independence in 1991, its long-time editor Vinko Nikolić returned to Zagreb and the magazine began to be published by Matica hrvatska, which was re-established in 1990 after having been dissolved in 1972, in the aftermath of the Croatian Spring. However, the magazine's popularity rapidly dwindled in the 1990s. In 2001 MH's quarterly Kolo took on the role as the institution's flagship literary magazine, while Hrvatska revija changed focus and began to be centered on articles covering various aspects of Croatian history, travelogues, Croatian communities abroad and occasional opinion pieces. The magazine also changed its visual identity which was more in line with the original 1930s design and restarted its numeration.

== Notable contributors ==
- Ivan Babić
- Dalibor Brozović
- Ivan Meštrović
- Dubravka Oraić Tolić
- Tomislav Sunić
- Mara Švel-Gamiršek
