= Oroszló =

- Village
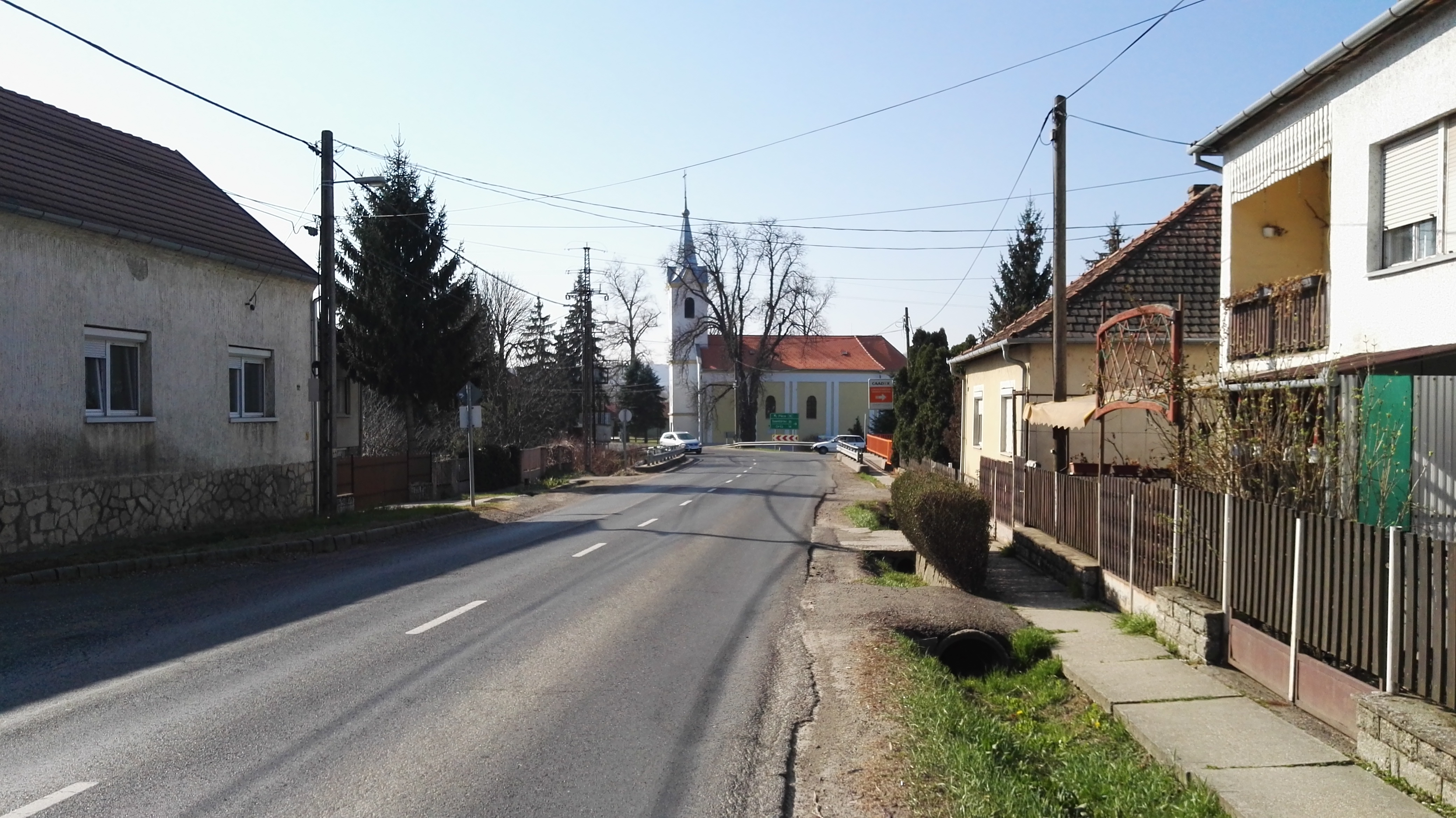
- Oroszló, Petőfi utca

- Flag Coat of arms

- Location within Hungary Location within Baranya County
- Coordinates: 46°13′N 18°08′E
- Country: Hungary
- County: Baranya
- Time zone: UTC+1 (CET)
  - Summer (DST): UTC+2 (CEST)

Oroszló is a village in the Komló District of Baranya county, Hungary.

== Etymology ==
The name comes from a Slavic personal name Zorislav. 1402/1406 Zoroslow.

== Location ==
It is located along the 66 main road between Pécs and Kaposvár, between Sásd and Magyarszék, in the southern vicinity of Sásd. The 6601 road branches off from the main road here towards Szentlőrinc. In addition to the mentioned cities, the settlement is easily accessible from Dombóvár and Komló as well.

== History ==
The name Oroszló was first mentioned in 1402 in documents, written as Zorozlow, later with the spellings Zoroslo and Zorozlo. The first known owner of the settlement was the Treutel family, specifically Miklós Treutel, who, however, died in 1422 without a male heir. In 1427-1428, Oroszló, along with other Treutel estates, was granted to Lévai Cseh Péter in the form of a new donation by King Sigismund. The estate later became the property of the Ország family from Gut and remained theirs until the mid-16th century. From the 18th century onwards, it belonged to the Petrovszky and Hrakovszky families.

At the beginning of the 20th century, Oroszló was part of the Szentlőrinc district of Baranya County.

In the census of 1910, the settlement had 464 residents, including 246 Hungarians and 218 Germans, with 445 being Roman Catholic, 7 Lutheran, and 11 Jewish.

According to the census data of 2001, Oroszló had 334 inhabitants, and in 2008, there were 328 people living in the settlement.

== Community Life ==
=== Mayors ===
- 1990–1994: Tibor Pozsgai (independent)
- 1994–1998: Tibor Pozsgai (independent)
- 1998–2002: Tibor Pozsgai (independent)
- 2002–2006: József Szabó (independent)
- 2006–2010: József Szabó (independent)
- 2010–2014: Miklósné Kázmér (independent)
- 2014–2019: Gábor Molnár (independent)
- From 2019: Gábor Molnár (independent)

== Notable Features ==
- The Roman Catholic church of Oroszló
- Cemetery chapel with a sanctuary of medieval origin.

== Translation ==
Content in this edit is translated from the existing Hungarian Wikipedia article at hu:Oroszló; see its history for attribution.
