= Río Tercero explosion =

1995 disaster in Argentina

The Río Tercero explosion was a series of explosions in Río Tercero, Córdoba, Argentina, that happened on 3 November 1995 at Río Tercero Military Factory, an ammunition factory, during Carlos Menem's presidency. The explosions killed seven people, injured over 300 and destroyed the factory and part of the city.

The blast was initially ruled accidental, but subsequent investigations revealed that the explosion was deliberately planned. In 2014, the Federal Oral Tribunal of Córdoba N° 2 delivered the sentence on the case, condemning four high functionaries of the state-owned corporation Fabricaciones Militares, all of them engineers and retired military men, to 10 and 13 years in prison, for the crime of Intentional Havoc Aggravated by the death of people in a degree of co-authorship.

The tribunal concluded with unanimity and certainty that the plant was destroyed to hide the smuggling of weapons to Croatia and Ecuador which took place from 1991 to 1995. In August 2008, former President Carlos Menem was placed under investigation for his role in the explosion.

== Events ==
On 3 November 1995, at 8:55 am, a series of explosions started in the Río Tercero Military Factory, killing seven people, all of them unrelated to the factory, and injuring over 300 people, most of whom were outside of the factory. None of the 400 employees present during the catastrophe were killed.

The factory was 200 m (660 ft) away from the edge of the urban area, and the blast leveled dozens of homes and seriously damaged hundreds more. Neighboring areas were covered in splinters, debris and war ammunition as a result of the explosion.

The seven people that died (Romina Torres, Laura Muñoz, Aldo Aguirre, Leonardo Solleveld, Hoder Dalmasso, Elena Rivas de Quiroga, and José Varela) were all unrelated to the factory, just like most of the injured. Thousands of people fled the city to the neighboring towns, and stayed in squares and friendly houses, while the inhabitants helped them by providing food, water and telephone access to communicate with their families.

At 5:00 pm, President Carlos Menem flew to Río Tercero and held a press conference, in which he stated that the explosions started by "accident". When reporters asked if it could be a terrorist attack, Menem answered:

"I'm telling you that no, discard it totally, it was an accident... It was an accident and not an attack. You have the obligation to spread this word."

The theory set forth by Menem dominated the judicial investigations and the media for years.

== Investigation ==
The Tribunal was able to reconstruct the sequence of events using forensic analysis and witness statements during the trial.

There were three explosions inside the factory. The first two happened simultaneously in the cargo plant and the shipping and storage warehouse, with the latter being the strongest of the two, with the intent to redirect the shock wave away from the workers inside the factory. These explosions ignited the one hundred thousand tons of projectiles stored in the ammunition warehouse, and this third explosion was the one that caused the extensive damage to a large part of the city, especially the surrounding neighborhoods.

The tribunal determined that people not yet identified, with knowledge about explosives, entered the factory at night on 2 November or in the early morning of 3 November, and went to the cargo plant and the shipping and storage warehouse, "with the mission to prepare the elements that started the fire, place the detonators and reinforcers needed to cause the explosions hours later".

The night before the incident, Lieutenant colonel Oscar Quiroga, subdirector of the factory and in charge of it thanks to the director's absence, gave an unusual order: to not allow the private vehicles of the neighbors to park in front of the factory (something the neighbors frequently did without problems). In the days before the incident, an excessive amount of TNT and crates of 105 mm cannon projectiles were stockpiled on the Cargo Plant, something both unusual and dangerous. Many workers, senior staff and the Union complained about this situation, demanding the transfer of the explosives and ammunition to a safe place. Another suspicious event was that, the week before the incident, Colonel Cornejo Torino, the director of the factory, and Lieutenant colonel Quiroga, the subdirector, both traveled to Buenos Aires.

At approximately 8:50 am, a tank of TNT caught fire in the cargo plant, followed by others. The cargo plant shed stored approximately 200 tanks of explosives, stored in two separated groups, the biggest one of TNT, and the smaller one of hexolite. There also were projectiles without a fuze. Minutes before the fire started, Emilio Ostera, the supervisor, saw a person dressed as a soldier near the tank, even though he did not have any reason to be there. Ostera and other workers tried to put out the fire, but then the cargo plant shed exploded, and the shock wave flung Ostera approximately 80 m away, seriously injuring him.

At 8:55 am, the first two explosions happened simultaneously, leaving two craters, one bigger than the other. The official chemical forensic team (engineers Yorio, Sicilia, Zanoni and Rodríguez) determined that the fire could not have detonated the TNT and hexolite, and established that a detonator and a reinforcer must have been used. The two initial explosions had a differential power, so the smaller one could counter the biggest, and redirect the shock wave to the southeast. This direction was picked because there would not be anyone on the southeastern area of the factory at that moment of the day. It was pay day, so most workers were on the western area collecting their wages, and the rest would be on the dining hall, also on the west, because their break started at 9:00 am.

The accounting forensic team also determined that in the Río Tercero Military Factory there was much less ammunition stored than was registered in their books. Between 23,405 and 49,000 pieces of ammunition were missing, between one third and two thirds of the declared total number.
