= First ladies and gentlemen of Argentina =

Honorary title

First Lady of the Argentine Nation
- Primera dama de la Nación Argentina
- Coat of arms of Argentina
- Incumbent; Vacant since 10 December 2023
- Style: Madam First Lady (female) or Mister First Gentleman (male)
- Residence: Quinta de Olivos
- Term length: Coterminous to presidential term (4 years)
- Inaugural holder: Juana del Pino
- Formation: February 8, 1826
- Final holder: Fabiola Yáñez

First Lady or First Gentleman of Argentina (Spanish: Primera dama o Primer caballero de Argentina), also known as First Lady or First Gentleman of the Argentine Nation (Spanish: Primera dama o Primer caballero de la Nación Argentina), is a title typically held by the spouse of the president of Argentina, concurrent with the president's term in office. Although the first lady's role has never been codified or officially defined, she figures prominently in the political and social life of Argentina. The First Lady of Argentina is the hostess of the Quinta de Olivos, and on special occasions of the Casa Rosada.

== Role ==
The first lady or first gentleman is not an elected position, carries no official duties and brings no salary. Nonetheless, he or she participates in humanitarian and charitable work. Furthermore, many have taken an active role in campaigning for the president with whom they are associated.

Some facts about the first ladies and gentlemen of Argentina:

- Juana del Pino y Vera Mujica, born in Uruguay and Regina Pacini, born in Portugal are the only two First Ladies of Argentina who were born in a foreign country.
- Eva Perón (1919–1952), First Lady from 1946 until her death, was the most important and influential First Lady, known for her work in many charitable and feminist causes. Before her death, the Argentine Congress named her the "Spiritual Leader of the Nation".
- Isabel Perón was the first First Lady to become the President of Argentina in 1974 after the death of her husband, Juan Domingo Perón.
- Zulema Yoma, is the first First Lady of Argentina in the history of her country of Arab descent.
- Zulema María Eva Menem, nicknamed Zulemita, was the first and only presidential daughter, officially known to act as a first lady.
- Cristina Fernández, former First Lady from 2003 to 2007 was the first woman democratically elected President of Argentina.
- Néstor Kirchner (1950–2010), former Argentine president, was the only First Gentleman of Argentina.

== List ==
This list included all persons who served as first ladies or first gentlemen, regardless of whether they were married to the incumbent president or not, as well as persons who are considered to have acted as first lady by the official Casa Rosada website.

| President No. | Portrait | First Lady or Gentleman (Maiden name) | Tenure | Age at tenure start | President (Spouse, partner or family member) |
|---|---|---|---|---|---|
| 1 | Portrait engraving of Juana del Pino | Juana Josefa Joaquina del Pino y Vera-Mujica de Rivadavia; Birth country: Uruguay; December 28, 1786 – December 14, 1841 (aged 54) | February 8, 1826 – June 27, 1827 | 39 years, 42 days | Bernardino Rivadavia m. December 14, 1809 |
| 2 | Portrait engraving of Lucia Petrona | Lucía Petrona Riera Merlo de López; July 3, 1794 – January 30, 1887 (aged 92) | July 7, 1827 – August 18, 1827 | 33 years, 46 days | Vicente López y Planes m. March 1, 1813 |
| 3 | Portrait engraving of Dolores Costa | Facunda Dolores; Costa Brizuela de De Urquiza; November 27, 1831 – November 8, 1896 (aged 64) | March 5, 1854 – March 5, 1860 | 22 years, 98 days | Justo José de Urquiza m. October 12, 1855 |
| 4 | Portrait of Modesta García | Modesta García de Cossio y Vedoya-Lagraña de Derqui; January 28, 1825– November 12, 1885 (aged 60) | March 5, 1860 – November 5, 1861 | 35 years, 37 days | Santiago Derqui m. May 14, 1845 |
| 5 | Official coat | Juana Rosa; Heredia Cañas de Pedernera; January 3, 1805– August 26, 1886 (aged 81) | November 5, 1861 – December 12, 1861 | 56 years, 306 days | Juan Esteban Pedernera m. May 23, 1823 |
| 6 | Portrait of Maria Luisa Vedia | Delfina María Luisa de Vedia Pérez de Mitre; December 12, 1819 – September 6, 1882 (aged 62) | December 12, 1861 – October 12, 1868 | 42 years, 0 days | Bartolomé Mitre m. January 8, 1841 |
| 7 | Portrait of Benita Martinez | Benita Agustina; Martínez Pastoriza de Sarmiento; August 26, 1819 – October 6, 1890 (aged 71) | October 12, 1868 – October 12, 1874 | 49 years, 78 days | Domingo Faustino Sarmiento m. May 19, 1848 |
| 8 | Portrait of Carmen Nobrega | Carmen; Nóbrega Miguens de Avellaneda; July 16, 1836 – February 18, 1899 (aged 62) | October 12, 1874 – October 11, 1880 | 38 years, 88 days | Nicolás Avellaneda m. October 23, 1861 |
| 9 | Portrait of Clara Funes | Clara Dolores del Corazón de Jesús; Funes Díaz de Roca; March 29, 1849 – May 2, 1890 (aged 41) | October 12, 1880 – October 11, 1886 | 31 years, 197 days | Julio Argentino Roca m. August 21, 1872 |
| 10 | Portrait of Elisea Funes | Benedicta Elisa; Funes Díaz de Juárez; January 12, 1853 – November 21, 1933 (aged 80) | October 12, 1886 – August 6, 1890 | 33 years, 273 days | Miguel Juárez Celman m. April 20, 1872 |
| 11 | Portrait of Carolina Lagos | Carolina Ignacia; Lagos García de Pellegrini; February 1, 1852 – September 28, 1925 (aged 73) | August 7, 1890 – October 11, 1892 | 38 years, 187 days | Carlos Pellegrini m. December 25, 1843 |
| 12 | Portrait of Cipriana Lahitte | Cipriana; Lahitte Bonavía de Sáenz-Peña; Birth country: Uruguay; December 6, 1829 – October 23, 1916 (aged 86) | October 12, 1892 – January 23, 1895 | 62 years, 311 days | Luis Sáenz-Peña m. November 18, 1848 |
| 13 | Portrait of Leonor Tezanos Pinto | Leonor Hermenegilda del Carmen; Tezanos-Pinto Segovia de De Uriburu; August 26, 1850 – October 13, 1916 (aged 66) | January 24, 1895 – October 11, 1898 | 44 years, 151 days | José E. de Uriburu m. March 19, 1841 |
| Vacant | | | October 12, 1898 – October 12, 1904 | | Julio Argentino Roca |
| 14 | Portrait of Susana Rodriguez | Susana; Rodríguez Viana de Quintana; July 9, 1843 – May 5, 1930 (aged 86) | October 12, 1904 – March 12, 1906 | 61 years, 95 days | Manuel Quintana m. December 14, 1861 |
| 15 | Portrait of Josefa Roldan | Josefa Julia María; Bouquet Roldán de Figueroa; September 19, 1863 – March 20, 1941 (aged 77) | March 13, 1906 – October 11, 1910 | 42 years, 175 days | José Figueroa Alcorta m. April 16, 1888 |
| 16 | Portrait of Isidora González | Rosa Isidora; González Delgado de Sáenz-Peña; September 1, 1858 – January 17, 1948 (aged 89) | October 11, 1910– August 10, 1914 | 52 years, 40 days | Roque Sáenz-Peña m. February 4, 1887 |
| 17 | Official Coat of Arms | Emily Henry de De la Plaza; Birth country: Scotland | August 10, 1914 – October 12, 1916 | | Victorino de la Plaza; 1884 (Note: Ms. Henry never married de la Plaza, whose first wife, Estefanía Éclida Belvis Castellanos, died in 1875. She was, however, the mother of his only child, born in 1885.) |
| Vacant | | | October 12, 1916 – October 12, 1922 | | Hipólito Yrigoyen |
| 18 | Portrait of Regina Pacini | Regina Isabel Luisa; Pacini Quintero de De Alvear; Birth country: Portugal; January 6, 1871 – September 18, 1965 (aged 94) | October 12, 1922 – October 11, 1928 | 51 years, 279 days | Torcuato de Alvear m. April 29, 1907 |
| Vacant | | | October 12, 1928 – September 6, 1930 | | Hipólito Yrigoyen |
| 19 | Portrait of Aurelia Madero Buján | Aurelia; Madero Buján de Uriburu de facto February 22, 1873 – November 14, 1959 (aged 86) | September 6, 1930 – February 19, 1932 | 57 years, 196 days | José Félix Uriburu de facto m. November 19, 1894 |
| 20 | Portrait of Ana Encarnación Bernal Harris | Ana Encarnación; Bernal Harris de Justo; June 9, 1878 – December 26, 1942 (aged 64) | February 20, 1932 – February 19, 1938 | 53 years, 256 days | Agustín Pedro Justo m. December 1, 1900 |
| 21 | Portrait of Leonor Tezanos Pinto | María Luisa; Iribarne Daubert de Ortiz; May 11, 1887– April 3, 1940 (aged 52) | February 20, 1938 – April 3, 1940 died in office | 50 years, 285 days | Roberto M. Ortiz m. May 11, 1912 |
| Vacant | | | April 3, 1940 – June 27, 1942 | | Roberto M. Ortiz m. May 11, 1912 |
| 22 | Portrait of Ana Encarnación Bernal Harris | María Delia; Luzuriaga Chaves de Castillo; October 10, 1881– October 11, 1955 (aged 74) | June 27, 1942 – June 4, 1943 | 60 years, 260 days | Ramón S. Castillo m. September 10, 1903 |
| 23 | Portrait of María Inés Lobato Mulle | María Inés; Lobato Mulle de Ramírez de facto May 17, 1892 – January 26, 1947 (aged 54) | June 7, 1943 – February 23, 1944 | 51 years, 21 days | Pedro Pablo Ramírez de facto m. May 7, 1917 |
| 24 | Portrait of Conrada Victoria Torni | Conrada Victoria; Torni Carpani de Farrell de facto January 1, 1893 – August 16, 1977 (aged 84) | February 24, 1944 – June 3, 1946 | 51 years, 54 days | Edelmiro Farrell de facto m. June 10, 1919 |
| 25 | Official portrait of Eva Perón | María Eva; Duarte Ibarguren de Perón; May 7, 1919 – July 26, 1952 (aged 33) | June 4, 1946 – July 26, 1952 died in office | 27 years, 28 days | Juan Perón m. October 22, 1945 |
| Vacant | | | July 26, 1952 – September 19, 1955 | | Juan Perón m. October 22, 1945 |
| 26 | Portrait of Mercedes Villada Achával | Mercedes; Villada Achával de Lonardi de facto September 1, 1903 – December 2, 1988 (aged 85) | September 23, 1955 – November 12, 1955 | 52 years, 22 days | Eduardo Lonardi de facto m. December 12, 1924 |
| 27 | Official portrait of Sara Lucía Herrera | Sara Lucía; Herrera Contreras de Aramburu de facto December 13, 1910 – October 2, 1997 (aged 86) | November 13, 1955 – May 1, 1958 | 44 years, 335 days | Pedro Eugenio Aramburu de facto m. February 18, 1933 |
| 28 | Official portrait of Elena Faggionatto | Elena Luisa María; Faggionatto Cavicchi de Frondizi; June 30, 1907 – April 24, 1991 (aged 83) | May 1, 1958 – March 29, 1962 | 50 years, 305 days | Arturo Frondizi m. January 2, 1933 |
| 29 | Official Coat of Arms of Argentina | Purificación Areal de Guido de facto February 21, 1921 – November 23, 1998 (aged 77) | March 29, 1962 – October 12, 1963 | 41 years, 36 days | José María Guido de facto m. April 20, 1946 |
| 30 | Portrait of Silvia Martorell | Silvia Elvira; Martorell Kaswalder de Illia; November 19, 1915 – September 6, 1966 (aged 50) | October 12, 1963 – June 28, 1966 | 47 years, 327 days | Arturo Illia m. April 15, 1939 |
| 31 | Photo of Maria Emilia Green | María Emilia; Green Urien de Onganía de facto July 31, 1915 – August 12, 1990 (aged 75) | June 29, 1966 – June 8, 1970 | 50 years, 333 days | Juan Carlos Onganía de facto m. December 31, 1937 |
| 32 | Photo of Bety Andrés | Bety Nelly; Andrés Llana de Levingston de facto May 4, 1926 (age 100) | June 18, 1970 – March 21, 1971 | 44 years, 45 days | Roberto M. Levingston de facto m. December 18, 1943 |
| 33 | Photo of Ileana Bell Bidart | Ileana María; Bell Bidart de Lanusse de facto May 19, 1919 – July 16, 2012 (aged 93) | March 26, 1971 – May 25, 1973 | 51 years, 311 days | Alejandro Agustín Lanusse de facto m. November 15, 1949 |
| 34 | Portrait of Mr. and Mrs. Cámpora | María Georgina Cecilia; Acevedo Pérez de Cámpora; December 12, 1917 – March 28, 1994 (aged 76) | May 25, 1973 – July 13, 1973 | 55 years, 164 days | Héctor Cámpora m. April 15, 1937 |
| 35 | Portrait of Norma López Rega | Norma Beatriz; López-Rega Maseda de Lastiri; February 17, 1945 (age 81) | July 13, 1973 – October 12, 1973 | 28 years, 146 days | Raúl Lastiri; 1973 (Note: Lastiri was technically still married to Amelia Concepción Martino Posterivo (January 25, 1920 - August 13, 2009). They married on August 5, 1943, and were separated no later than 1972.) |
| 36 | Photo of Isabel Perón | María Estela; Martínez Cartas de Perón; February 4, 1931 (age 95) | October 12, 1973 – July 1, 1974 | 42 years, 250 days | Juan Perón m. September 15, 1961 |
| Vacant | | | July 1, 1974 – March 24, 1976 | | Isabel Perón |
| 37 | Photo of Alicia Raquel Hartridge Lacoste | Alicia Raquel; Hartridge Lacoste de Videla de facto September 28, 1927 - November 4, 2021 (aged 94) | March 29, 1976 – March 29, 1981 | 48 years, 183 days | Jorge Rafael Videla de facto m. April 6, 1948 |
| 38 | Official Coat of Arms of Argentina | Nélida; Giorgio Valente de Viola de facto August 8, 1926 - June 11, 2004 (aged 77) | March 29, 1981 – December 11, 1981 | 54 years, 233 days | Roberto Viola de facto m. December 5, 1947 |
| 39 | Official Coat of Arms of Argentina | Lucía Noemí; Gentili Cecchi de Galtieri de facto December 13, 1926 - January 29, 2019 (aged 92) | December 22, 1981 – June 18, 1982 | 55 years, 9 days | Leopoldo Galtieri de facto m. December 15, 1949 |
| 40 | Official Coat of Arms of Argentina | Nilda Raquel; Belén Etcheverry de Bignone de facto July 20, 1928 - March 13, 2013 (aged 84) | July 1, 1982 – December 10, 1983 | 53 years, 346 days | Reynaldo Bignone de facto m. January 8, 1953 |
| 41 | Photo of Maria Barreneche | María Lorenza; Barreneche Iriarte de Alfonsín; July 3, 1929 – January 5, 2016 (aged 86) | December 10, 1983 – July 8, 1989 | 54 years, 160 days | Raúl Alfonsín m. February 4, 1949 |
| 42 | Photo of Zulema Yoma | Zulema Fátima; Yoma Gazal de Menem; December 18, 1942 (age 83) | July 8, 1989 – April 26, 1995 (divorce) | 46 years, 172 days | Carlos Menem m. September 7, 1966 (Note: They were separated in 1990, and divorced in 1995.) |
| 43 | Official coat | Zulema María Eva Menem Yoma; December 25, 1970 (age 55) | April 26, 1995 – December 10, 1999 | 24 years, 122 days | Carlos Menem (daughter) |
| 44 | Official coat | Inés; Pertiné Urien de De la Rúa; December 27, 1942 (age 83) | December 10, 1999 – December 21, 2001 | 56 years, 348 days | Fernando de la Rúa m. December 27, 1970 |
| 45 | Official Coat of Arms of Argentina | María Alicia; Mazzarino Daglio de Rodríguez-Saá; 1948 – August 14, 2024 (aged 76) | December 23, 2001 – December 30, 2001 | 53 years | Adolfo Rodríguez Saá m. 1973 (Note: They were separated in 2003, and divorced no later than 2006.) |
| 46 | Official coat | Hilda Beatriz; González Giménez de Duhalde; October 14, 1944 (age 82) | January 2, 2002 – May 25, 2003 | 57 years, 80 days | Eduardo Duhalde m. June 28, 1971 |
| 47 | Photo of CFK | Cristina Elisabet; Fernández Wilhelm de Kirchner; February 19, 1953 (age 73) | May 25, 2003 – December 10, 2007 | 50 years, 95 days | Néstor Kirchner m. May 8, 1975 |
| 48 | Photo of Nestor Kirchner | Néstor Carlos; Kirchner Ostoich; February 25, 1950 – October 27, 2010 (aged 60) | December 10, 2007 – October 27, 2010 died in office | 57 years, 288 days | Cristina Fernández de Kirchner m. May 8, 1975 (Note: Their marriage ended when he died during her first term. The post was vacant during her second term) |
| Vacant | | | October 27, 2010 – December 10, 2015 | | Cristina Fernández de Kirchner m. May 8, 1975 |
| 49 | Photo of Juliana Awada | María Juliana; Awada Baker de Macri; April 3, 1974 (age 52) | December 10, 2015 – December 10, 2019 | 41 years, 251 days | Mauricio Macri m. November 14, 2010 |
| 50 | | Fabiola Andrea Yáñez de Fernández; July 14, 1981 (age 45) | December 10, 2019 – December 10, 2023 | 38 years, 149 days | Alberto Fernández; 2014 (Note: Yáñez and Fernández never married; they were a couple from 2014 to 2024.) |
| Vacant | | | December 10, 2023 – Present | | Javier Milei |

== Presidential couples gallery ==
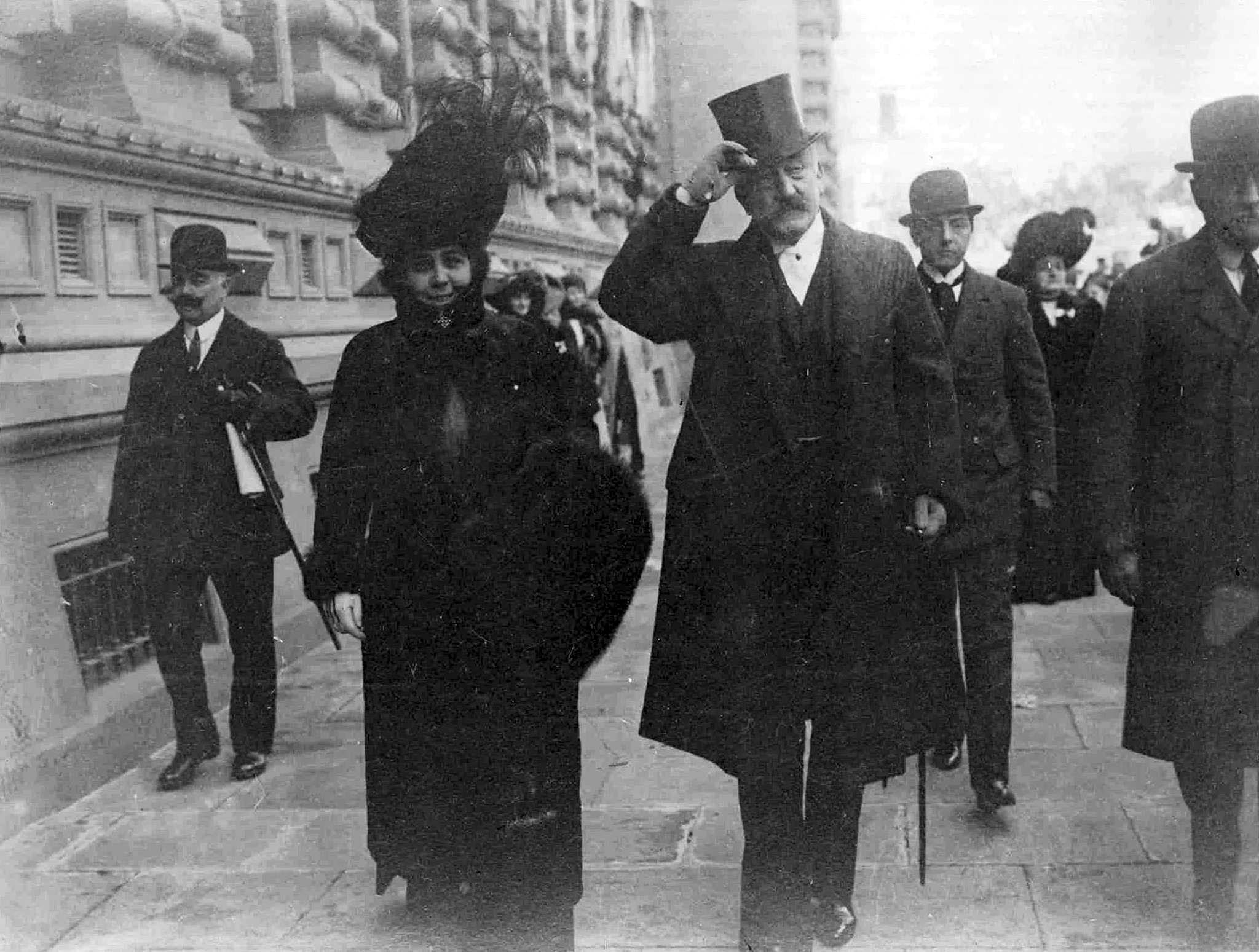
President Roque Sáenz-Peña and First Lady Isidora González.
First Lady, 1910–1914

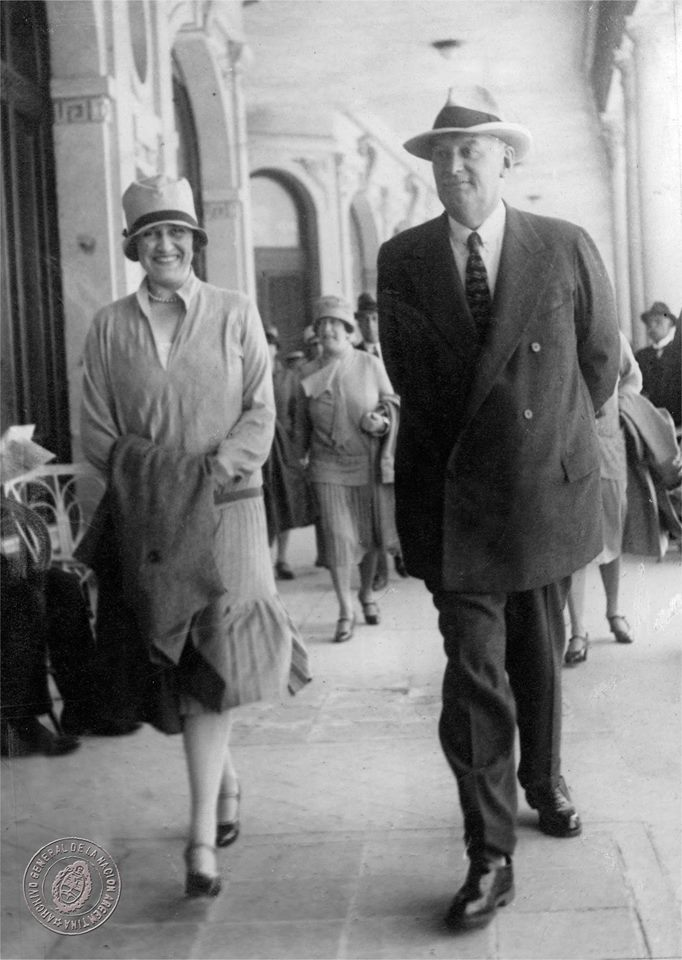
President Marcelo Torcuato de Alvear and First Lady Regina Pacini
First Lady, 1922–1928

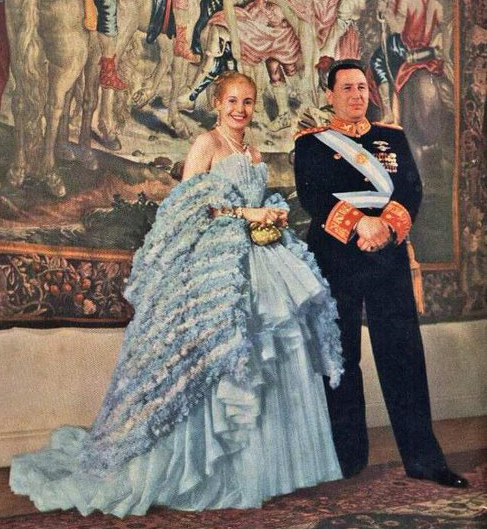
President Juan Perón and First Lady
Eva Duarte
First Lady, 1946–1952

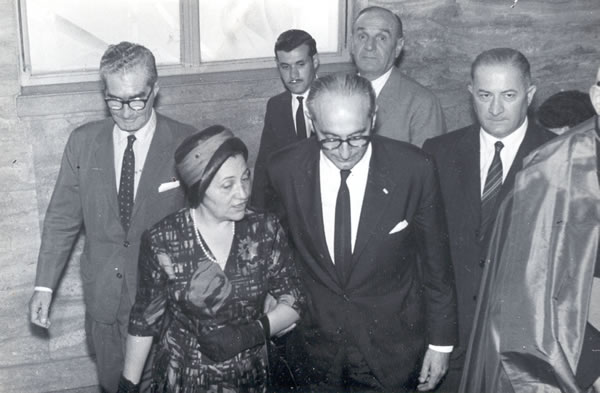
President Arturo Frondizi and First Lady Elena Faggionatto
First Lady, 1958–1962

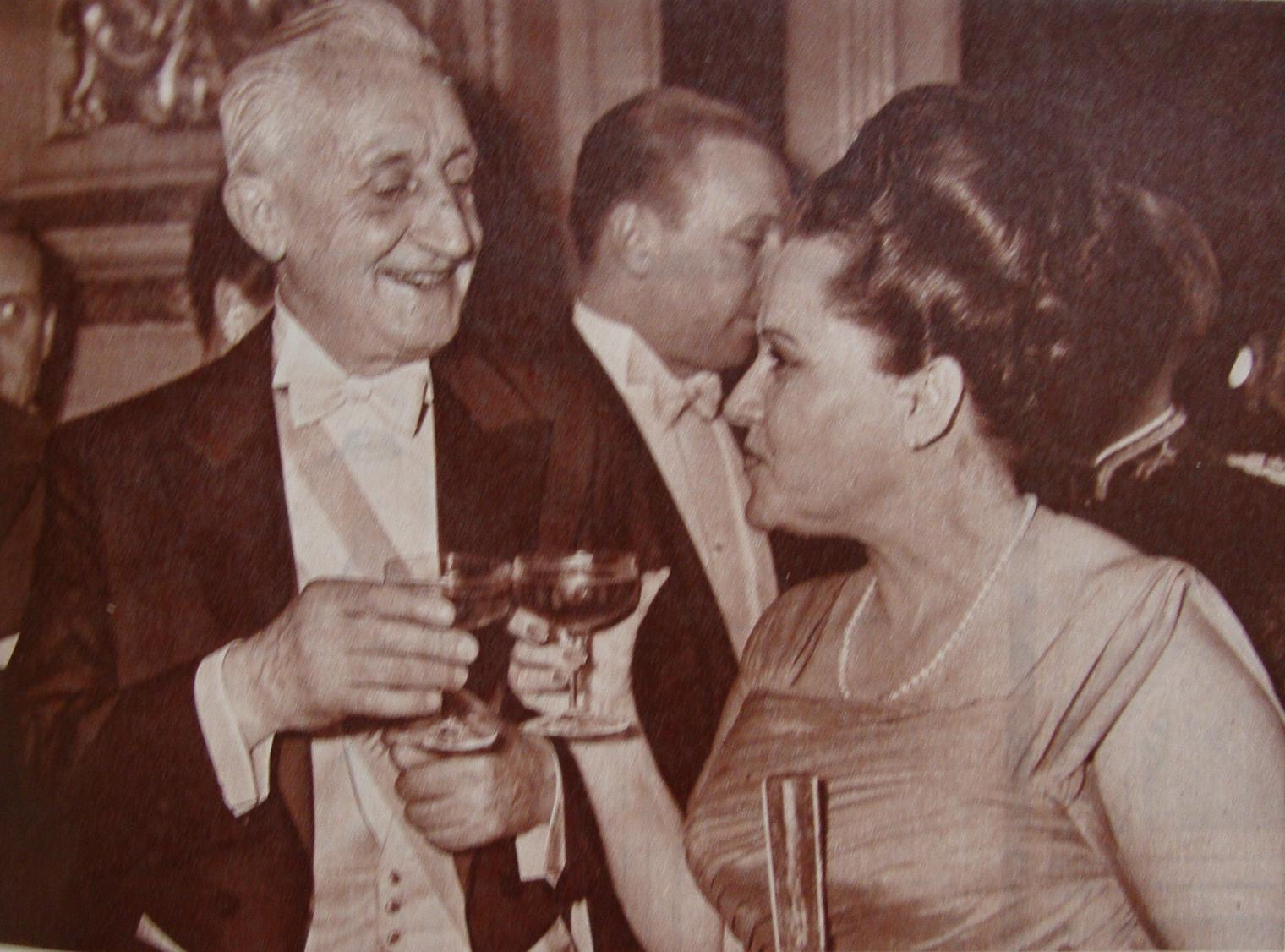
President Arturo Illia and First Lady
Silvia Martorell
First Lady, 1963–1966

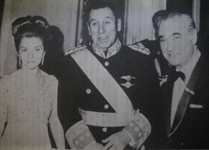
President Juan Perón and First Lady
María Estela "Isabel" Martínez
Mrs. Perón was the first First Lady in history to later become President (1974).

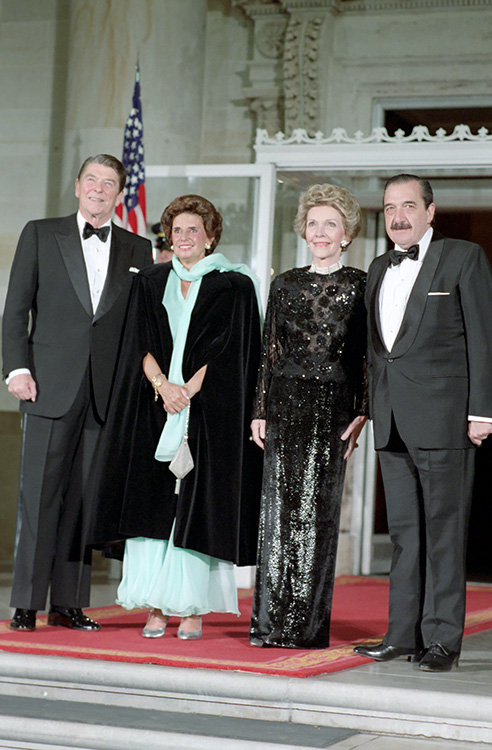
President Raúl Alfonsín and First Lady María Lorenza Barreneche
visit President and Mrs. Reagan at the White House in 1985

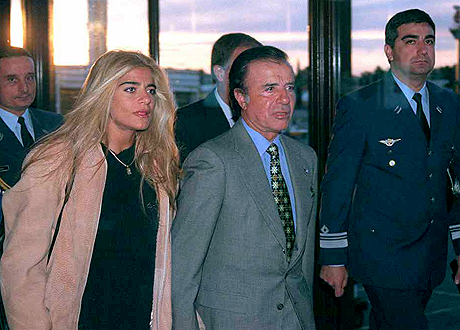
President Carlos Menem and his daughter Zulema
Ms. Menem was the only presidential daughter to act as First Lady (1995–99), following her parents' divorce.

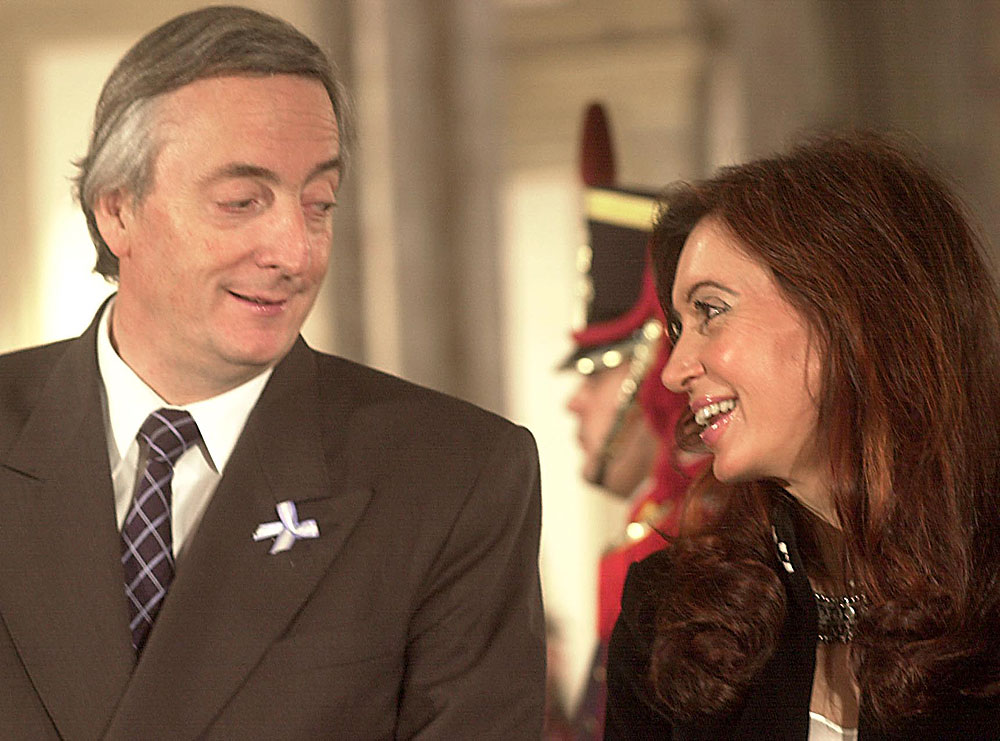
President Néstor Kirchner and future President Cristina Fernández
First Gentleman, 2007–2010 and
First Lady, 2003–2007

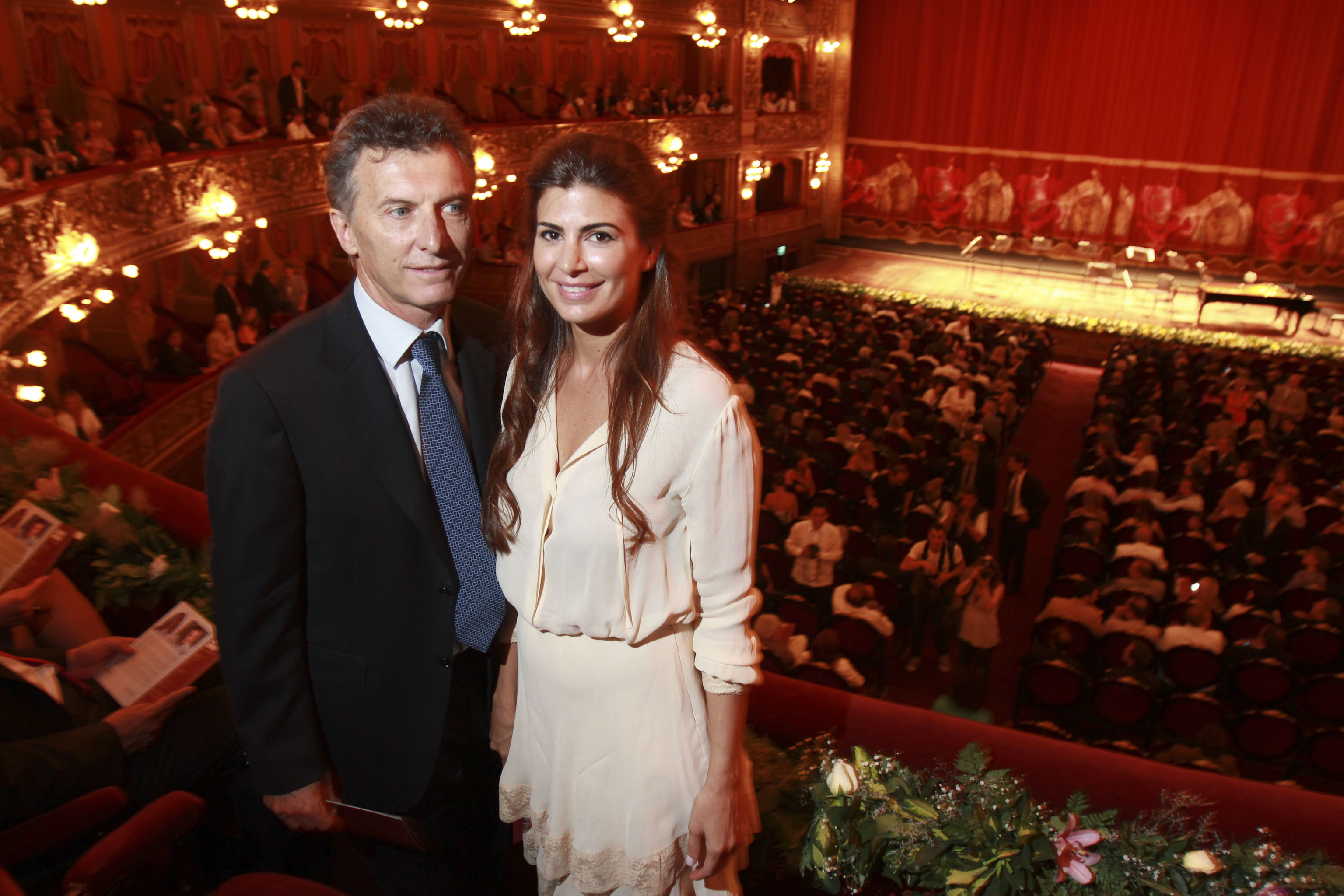
President Mauricio Macri and First Lady Juliana Awada
First Lady, 2015–2019

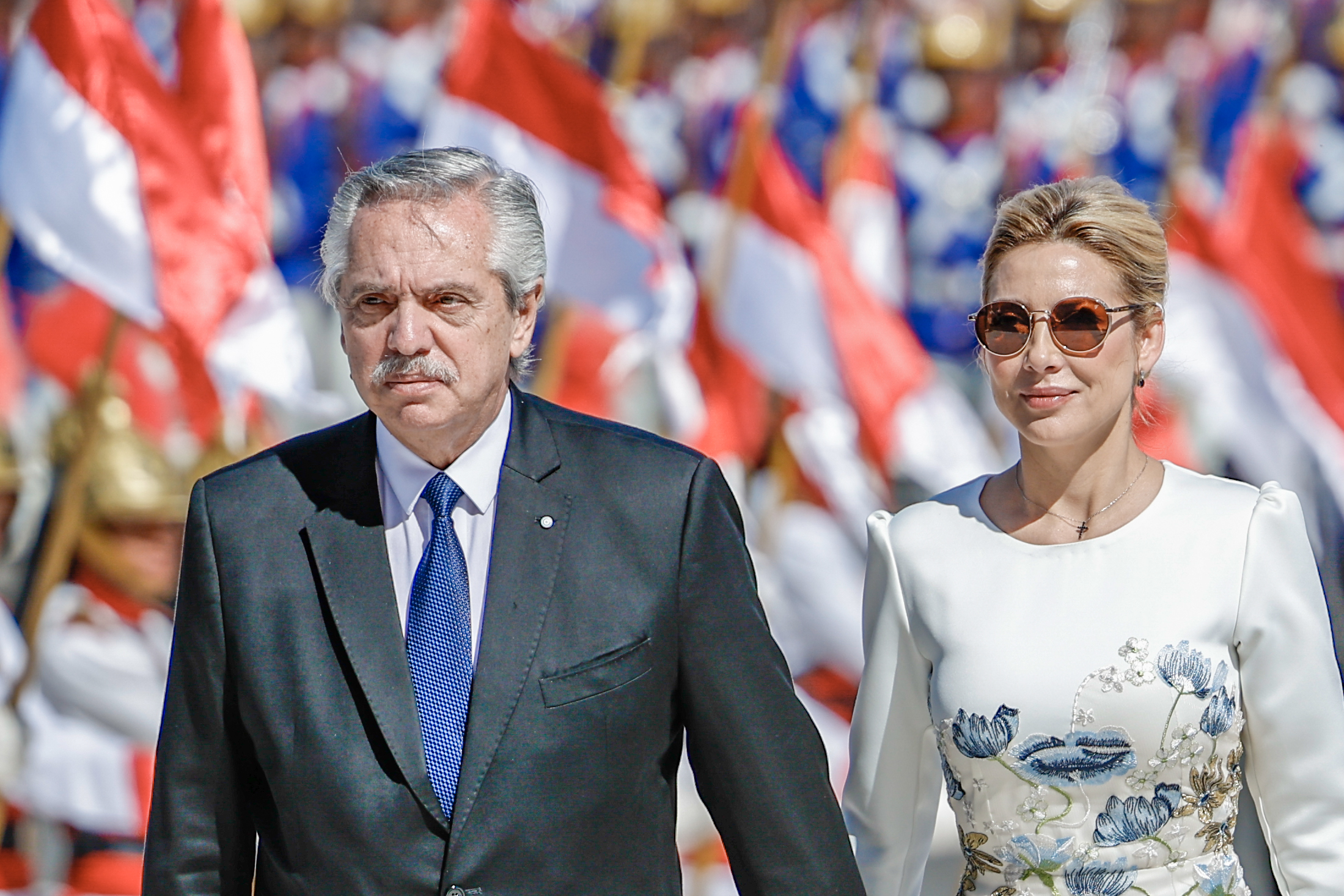
President Alberto Fernández and First Lady Fabiola Yáñez
First Lady, 2019–2023
