= Rivadavia Partido =

Rivadavia Partido de Rivadavia
- Partido
- location of Rivadavia Partido in Buenos Aires Province
- Coordinates: 35°29′S 62°59′W
- Country: Argentina
- Province: Buenos Aires
- Established: September 30, 1910
- Founder: provincial law 3273
- Seat: América

Government
  - Intendant: Juan Alberto Martínez (FR; UP)

Area
  - Total: 3,940 km^{2} (1,520 sq mi)

Population
  - Total: 15,452
  - Density: 3.92/km^{2} (10.2/sq mi)
- Demonym: rivadaviense
- Postal Code: B6237
- IFAM: BUE104
- Area Code: 2337
- Website: munirivadavia.gov.ar

Rivadavia is a partido in the northwest of Buenos Aires Province, Argentina, on the border with La Pampa Province. It has an area of 3,940 square kilometres (1,520 sq mi), and a population of 15,452 (2001 census [INDEC]).

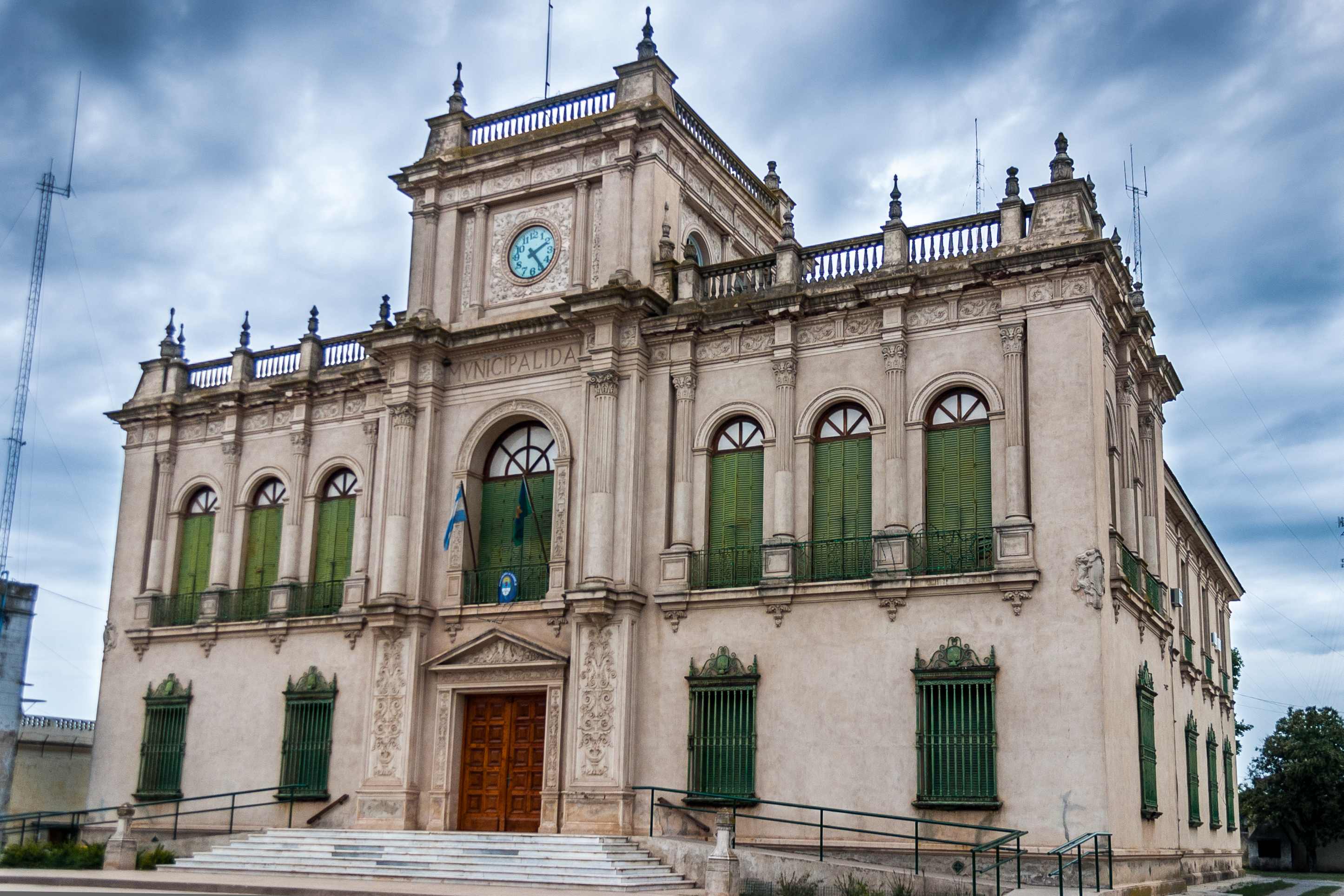
Palacio municipal

The partido, created in 1910, has the town of América as its capital, and its main economic activities are cattle, and the cultivation of wheat, maize and soya beans.

== Name ==
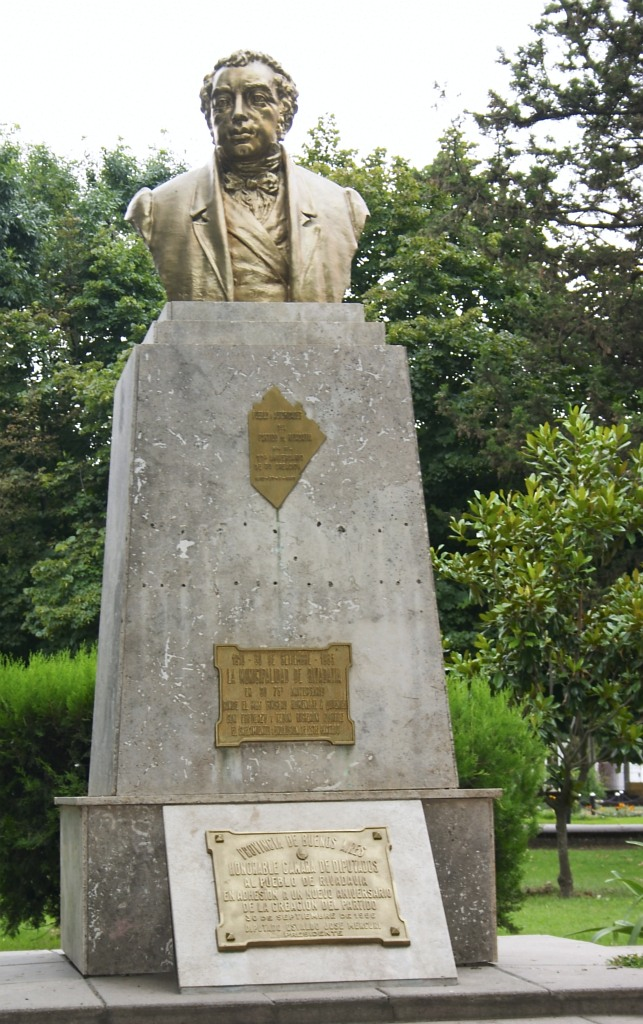
Statue of Bernardino Rivadavia in América

The partido is named in honour of Bernardino Rivadavia, a veteran of the Argentine War of Independence and President of Argentina 1826–1827.

== Towns and Villages ==
- América (capital, or cabecera, population 10,361, 35°29′18″S 62°58′31″W)
- Badano
- Cerrito
- Condarco
- Fortín Olavarría (population 1.005, 35°42′05″S 63°01′25″W)
- González Moreno (population 1,663, 35°33′16″S 63°22′43″W)
- Mira Pampa (population 54, 35°52′06″S 63°22′20″W)
- Roosevelt (population 288, 35°50′53″S 63°17′32″W)
- San Mauricio (population 28, 35°30′45″S 63°11′10″W)
- Sansinena, Buenos Aires (population 468, 35°45′52″S 63°08′22″W)
- Sumblad (population 96)
- Vadano
- Valentín Gómez (35°39′03″S 63°15′16″W)
- Villa Sena
