= Juana del Pino =

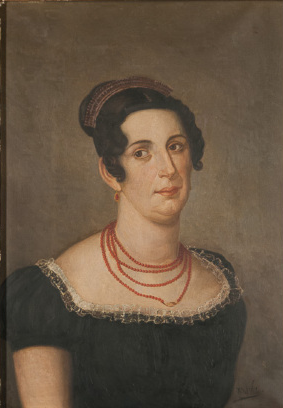

First Lady of Argentina
- Assumed role 8 February 1826 – 27 June 1827
- President: Bernardino Rivadavia
- Preceded by: Position established

Personal details
- Born: December 28, 1786 Montevideo, Viceroyalty of the Río de la Plata
- Died: December 14, 1841 (aged 54) Cádiz, Spain
- Spouse: Bernardino Rivadavia
- Children: 4

Juana Josefa Joaquina del Pino y Vera Mujica (December 28, 1786 – December 14, 1841) was the daughter of the viceroy of the Río de la Plata Joaquín del Pino and wife of Bernardino Rivadavia, first president of Argentina, and therefore the first woman to become First Lady of Argentina.

== Early life ==
Born in Montevideo, Viceroyalty of the Río de la Plata, Juana was the fourth daughter of the viceroy Joaquín del Pino and his second wife, the Argentine vicereine Rafaela de Vera Mujica y López Pintado.

In 1801, when her father was appointed viceroy of the Rio de la Plata, the family, which was in Chile, moved to Buenos Aires. Juana was then 15 years old. There, in one of the ceremonies organized by his father, she met her future husband, Bernardino Rivadavia. She was 17 years old and Bernardino 23 years old. Their courtship lasted six years.

== Marriage and children ==
On August 14, 1809 they were married in the Church of Nuestra Señora de La Merced, Buenos Aires. The newlyweds spent their honeymoon in the splendid and oldest ranch of Zárate, called Las Palmas. They had four children, three sons and one daughter: José Joaquín Benito Egidio (1810–1887), Constancia (1812–1816), Bernardino Donato (1814–1881), and Martín (1823–1885).

== Death ==
On December 14, 1841, Juana del Pino de Rivadavia died in the Brazilian capital. Her death was caused by sepsis after breaking a leg. Her husband returned to Spain in 1842, where he died in Cádiz, on September 2, 1845.
