= Bety Nelly Andrés =

First Lady of Argentina from 1970 to 1971

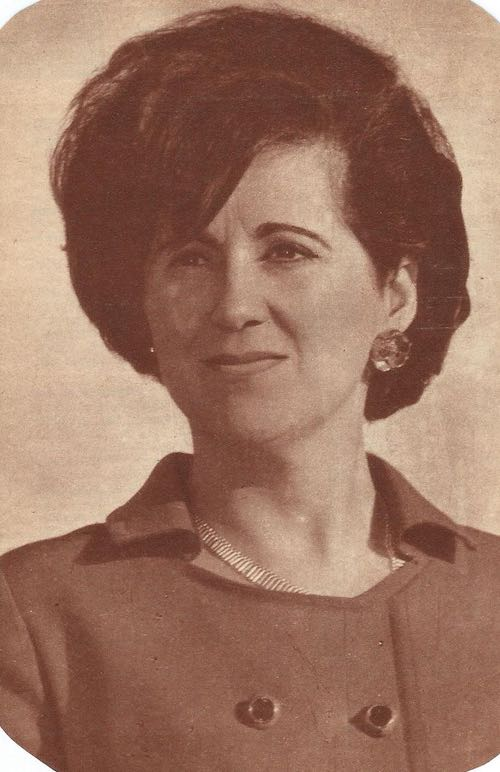
- Andrés in 1970

First Lady of Argentina
- In role 18 June 1970 – 21 March 1971
- President: Roberto Marcelo Levingston
- Preceded by: María Emilia Green Urien de Onganía
- Succeeded by: Ileana María Bell Bidart de Lanusse

Personal details
- Born: Bety Nelly Andrés Llana; 4 May 1926 (age 100) San Miguel, Buenos Aires Province, Argentina
- Spouse: Roberto Marcelo Levingston (m. 1943; died 2015)
- Children: 3

Bety Nelly Andrés Llana de Levingston (born 4 May 1926) is an Argentine socialite who briefly served as First Lady of Argentina between June 1970 and March 1971 as the wife of de facto President Roberto Levingston.

== Biography ==
Born in San Miguel, Buenos Aires, on 4 May 1926, Andrés Llana married Levingston in 1943.

Levingston, who served as de facto President of Argentina for less than a year in the early 1970s, was known for his protectionist policies and tough approach to militias and opponents of the military, especially Montoneros militants, including the usage of the death penalty. Andrés Llanas kept a largely low profile as Levingston's wife, dedicating herself to charitable activities and other ceremonial roles.

Andrés Llana and Levingston had three children, a son named Roberto Antonio (1945–1967), a daughter named María Cristina and a son named Alberto Marcelo. Before assuming power, Andrés Llana and Levingston lived as military attachés in Washington, D.C.. Levingston returned to Argentina amid the political turmoil that arose after the kidnapping and assassination of former de facto president Pedro Eugenio Aramburu by Montoneros militants.

After leaving office in 1971, Andrés Llana went into nearly total obscurity, her name appearing only a handful of times and both she and her husband being considered "forgotten" or "unknown" in Argentine political history. Andrés Llana was mentioned in the news upon the death of Levingston in June 2015 and again disappeared from public life.

Beginning in June 2024, a controversy ensued over privileged retirement payments for former presidents, first ladies, and other relatives of officials in Argentina. Among those receiving VIP salaries was Nelly Andrés Llana who, in November 2024, received a net pension of more than 6 million pesos. In a January 2026 note by La Nación, the newspaper called privileged pensions a "shame of many", comparing those receiving them to the pensioners who have protested weekly against President Javier Milei's austerity policies. In response to the outrage, the government said it was considering scrapping 13 privileged pensions, including those of former presidents Cristina Fernández de Kirchner and Alberto Fernández, but stated that it would not take measures against others like President Carlos Menem's widow Zulema Yoma, a daughter of president José María Guido and Bety Nelly Andrés Llana de Levingston. As of November 2025, Andrés Llana de Levingston kept getting the salary, amounting to more than 12 million pesos.
