= Benita Martínez Pastoriza =

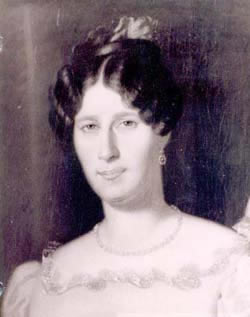

First Lady of Argentina
- In office 12 October 1868 – 11 October 1874
- President: Bartolomé Mitre
- Preceded by: Delfina María Luisa de Vedia Pérez de Mitre
- Succeeded by: Carmen Miguens de Avellaneda

Personal details
- Born: Benita Martínez Pastoriza de Sarmiento San Juan, Argentina
- Spouse: Bartolomé Mitre

Benita Martínez Pastoriza de Sarmiento (26 August 1819, San Juan, Argentina – 6 October 1890 in Buenos Aires, Argentina) was the second wife of Domingo Faustino Sarmiento, Argentina's First Lady, and the mother of Domingo Fidel Sarmiento. She was married to Domingo Castro y Calvo before being married to President Sarmiento.
