= Bernardino Rivadavia =

1st President of Argentina

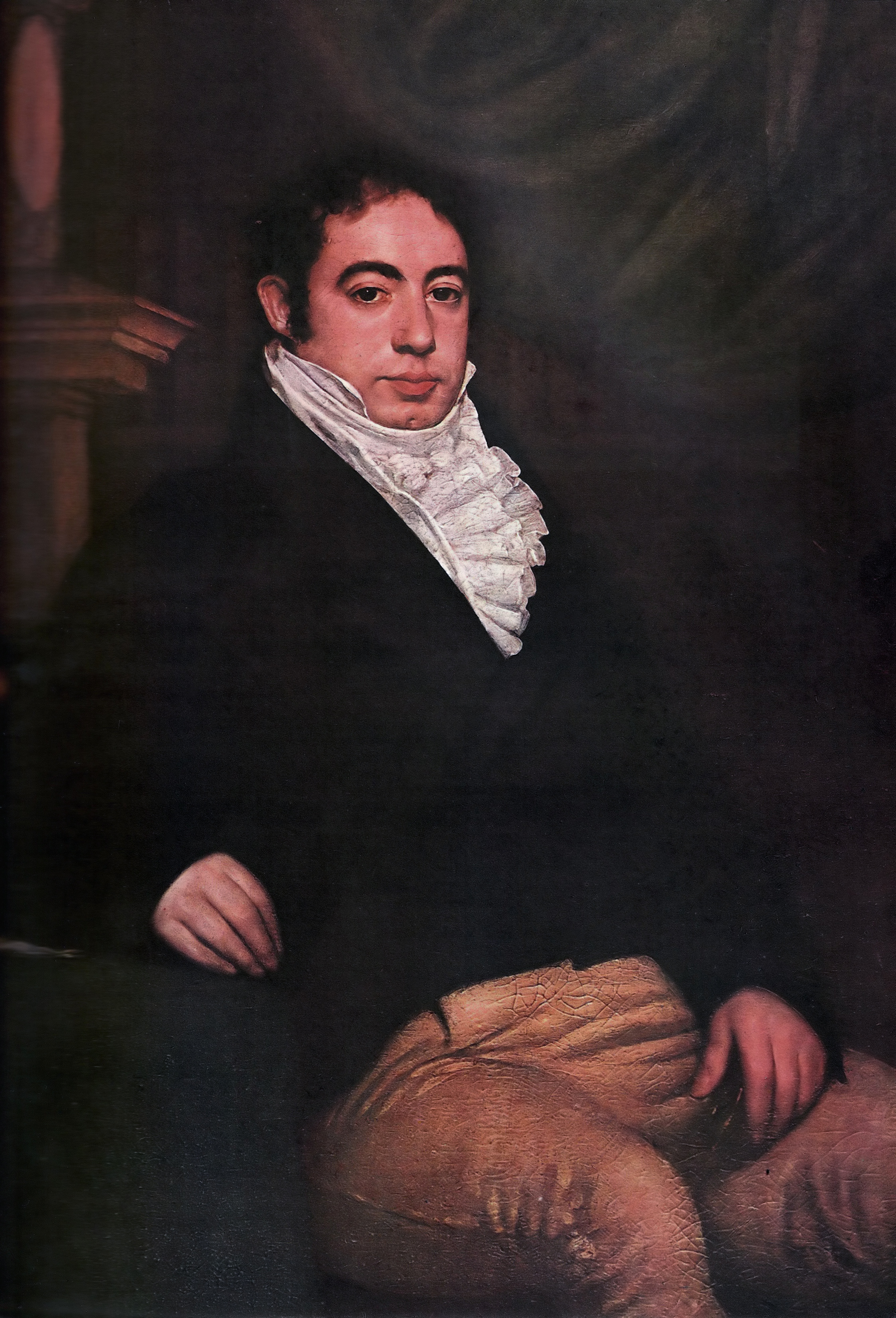

1st President of Argentina
- In office 8 February 1826 – 27 June 1827
- Preceded by: Juan Gregorio de Las Heras (as governor of Buenos Aires)
- Succeeded by: Vicente López

Minister of Government and Foreign Affairs of the United Provinces of the Río de la Plata
- In office 31 March 1821 – 2 April 1824

Minister of Government and Finance of the First Triumvirate
- In office 23 September 1811 – 8 October 1812

Minister-Secretary of War of the First Triumvirate
- In office 23 September 1811 – 8 October 1812

Personal details
- Born: May 20, 1780 Buenos Aires, Viceroyalty of the Río de la Plata
- Died: September 2, 1845 (aged 65) Cádiz, Spain
- Party: Unitarian Party
- Spouse: Juana del Pino y Vera Mujica (m. 1809; died 1841)
- Children: José Joaquín (1810-1887); Constancia (1812-1816); Bernardino Donato (1814-1881); Martín (1823-1885)
- Education: Real Colegio San Carlos
- Profession: Lawyer

Bernardino de la Trinidad González Rivadavia (May 20, 1780 – September 2, 1845) was an Argentine politician who played an important role in the governments established after the May Revolution. Rivadavia was the first President of the Argentine Republic, then called the United Provinces of the Río de la Plata, from February 8, 1826 to June 27, 1827.

He was educated at the Royal College of San Carlos, but left without finishing his studies. During the British Invasions he served as Third Lieutenant of the Galicia Volunteers. He participated in the open Cabildo on May 22, 1810 voting for the deposition of the viceroy. He had a strong influence on the First Triumvirate and shortly after he served as Minister of Government and Foreign Affairs of the Province of Buenos Aires.

Although there was a General Congress intended to draft a constitution, the beginning of the War with Brazil led to the immediate establishment of the office of President of Argentina; with Rivadavia being the first to be named to the post. Argentina's Constitution of 1826 was promulgated later, but was rejected by the provinces. Strongly contested by his political party, Rivadavia resigned and was succeeded by Vicente López y Planes.

Rivadavia retired to Spain, where he died in 1845. His remains were repatriated to Argentina in 1857, receiving honors as Captain General. His remains are in a mausoleum in Plaza Miserere, adjacent to Rivadavia Avenue, named after him.

== Biography ==
=== Early life ===
Rivadavia was born in Buenos Aires on May 20, 1780, the fourth son of Benito Bernardino González de Rivadavia, a wealthy Spanish lawyer, and his first wife, María Josefa de Jesús Rodríguez de Rivadeneyra. Both parents were born in the Galician town of Monforte de Lemos. Because of his dark appearance it has been alleged Rivadavia had African ancestry. On December 14, 1809, Bernardino Rivadavia married Juana del Pino y Vera Mujica, daughter of the viceroy of the Río de la Plata, Joaquín del Pino and his second wife, the vicereine Rafaela Francisca de Vera Mujica y López Pintado. His military appointment was rejected by Mariano Moreno.

=== Career ===
Rivadavia was active in both the Argentine resistance to the British invasion of 1806 and in the May Revolution movement for Argentine Independence in 1810. In 1811, Rivadavia became the dominant member of the governing triumvirate as Secretary of the Treasury and Secretary of War. Until its fall in October 1812, this government focused on creating a strong central government, moderating relations with Spain, and organizing an army.

By 1814 the Spanish King Ferdinand VII had returned to the throne and started the Absolutist Restoration, which had grave consequences for the governments in the Americas. Manuel Belgrano and Rivadavia were sent to Europe to seek support for the United Provinces from both Spain and Britain. They sought to promote the crowning of Francisco de Paula, son of Charles IV of Spain, as regent of the United Provinces, but in the end he refused to act against the interests of the King of Spain. The diplomatic mission was a failure, both in Spain and in Britain. He visited France as well, and returned to Buenos Aires in 1821, at their friends' request.

During his stay in Britain, Rivadavia saw the growing development of the Industrial Revolution, and the rise of Romanticism. He sought to promote a similar development in Buenos Aires, and invited many people to move to the city. He convinced Aimé Bonpland to visit the country, but few other invitations were accepted.

In June 1821, he was named minister of government to Buenos Aires by governor Martín Rodríguez. Over the next five years, he exerted a strong influence, and focused heavily on improving the city of Buenos Aires, often at the expense of greater Argentina. To make the former look more European, Rivadavia constructed large avenues, schools, paved and lighted streets. He founded the University of Buenos Aires, as well as the Theatre, Geology, and Medicine Academies and the continent's first museum of natural science.

He persuaded the legislature to authorize a one-million pound loan for public works that were never undertaken. The provincial bonds were sold in London through the Baring Brothers Bank, local and Buenos Aires-based British traders also acting as financial intermediaries. The borrowed money was in turn lent to these businessmen, who never repaid it. Of the original million pounds the Buenos Aires government received only £552,700. The province's foreign debt was transferred to the nation in 1825, its final repayment being made in 1904.

A strong supporter of a powerful, centralized government in Argentina, Rivadavia often faced violent resistance from the opposition federalists. In 1826, Rivadavia was elected the first President of Argentina. During his term he founded many museums, and expanded the national library.

=== Presidency (1826–1827) ===
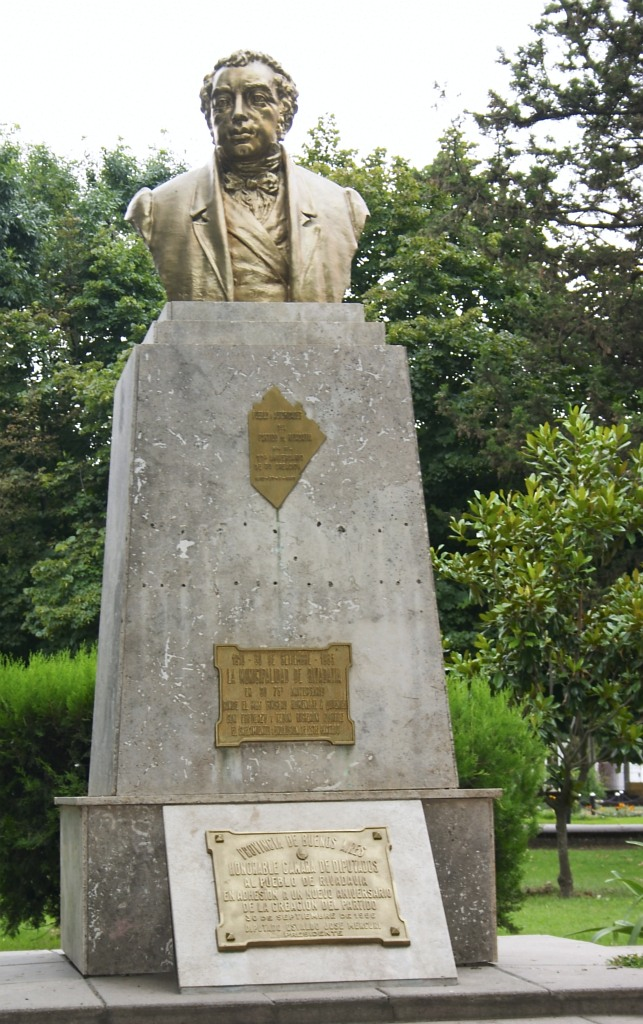
Bust of Bernardino Rivadavia in the city of América, Buenos Aires Province.

==== Overview ====
His government had many problems, primarily an ongoing war with Brazil over territory in modern Uruguay and resistance from provincial authorities. Faced with the rising power of the Federalist Party and with several provinces in open revolt, Rivadavia submitted his resignation on June 27, 1827. He was succeeded by Vicente López y Planes. At first he returned to private life, but fled to exile in Europe in 1829.

==== The Capitalization Law ====
Immediately after assuming office, Rivadavia presented to Congress a project to make Buenos Aires the capital: the city and much of the surrounding countryside were proclaimed the capital of the state. A few days later he issued a decree ordering the demarcation of the capital of the republic, and of the province of Buenos Aires.

==== Economic policy ====
The Discount Bank of the province was transformed into the National Bank in 1826.

Rivadavia's administration coincided with an increase in British influence in national politics. Rivadavia's scheme was based on five pillars: completely free trade and no protectionism against British imports, finances with a central bank managed by British investors, absolute control of the port of Buenos Aires as the sole source of income for the country, British exploitation of natural resources, and centralized unitarism in Buenos Aires. Gold exports, allowed by free-trade policies, quickly depleted national reserves. This represented a major problem, since gold was the medium of exchange of the local economy. Rivadavia sought to solve this problem by establishing the Discount Bank, a central bank to print money. Despite the role played by the central bank, this institution was placed in the hands of private British investors.

===== Nationalization of resources =====
President Rivadavia ordered the immediate nationalization of Buenos Aires and its institutions, including the customs house.

The Consolidation of the Public Debt of the State law declared all public lands of the nation mortgaged and prohibited their sale without special permission from Congress. Lands that had previously been considered provincial were nationalized and were to be subject to the system of emphyteusis. During the brief government of Rivadavia, in 1827 the paper peso was devalued by 33% and again by 68% in 1829. Emphyteusis, despite its progressive character, resulted in a strong process of concentration of land ownership in Buenos Aires: a total of 138 owners obtained 18,656,000 hectares. The most favored emphyteutic tenants included many collaborators of Bernardino Rivadavia's own government, including the families Anchorena, Alvear, Ortiz Basualdo, Díaz Vélez, Escalada, Irigoyen, Lezica, Lynch, Miguens, Obarrio, Ocampo, Olivera, Vidal, and Sáenz Valiente, among others. Emphyteusis placed more than eight million hectares at the disposal of tenants and emphyteutic holders, who generally did not pay or paid very low rents to the province. This law tended to favor the great concentration of property in a few dozen families.

==== The Constitution of 1826 ====
Under the pretext that the war with Brazil had been declared on 1 January 1826 and that a national government was necessary to direct and finance operations, in September of that year the Constitutional Affairs Commission presented a draft constitution based on the Constitution of 1819. After heated debates, forty-three deputies supported the project, while eleven opposed it. The constitution was enacted on 24 December 1826. The name United Provinces of South America was replaced by the Argentine Republic and a representative, republican, and unitary government was adopted.

==== Civil war in the interior ====
The reaction of the provinces was swift. From Córdoba, Juan Bautista Bustos led strong opposition to the new constitution and the presidential system. In La Rioja, Facundo Quiroga initially seemed favorable to Buenos Aires, but the civil war in the provinces of Catamarca and San Juan eventually placed him at the head of the federal forces. The rest of the provinces - Santa Fe, Entre Ríos, Mendoza, Santiago del Estero, San Luis and Salta - rejected the constitution but expressed their desire to continue the war with Brazil "without Congress or the president".

The government sent Colonel Gregorio Aráoz de Lamadrid to gather troops in the provinces of the Argentine Northwest to fight in the war with Brazil, but faced with the weakness of local authorities Lamadrid used the forces he had assembled to overthrow governor Javier López and take control of the government of Tucumán Province. Instead of disavowing him, Rivadavia encouraged him to use those troops to attack neighboring federal caudillos who opposed his policy. Lamadrid led the Unitarian Party in his province and invaded Catamarca, where he restored the Unitarian leader Manuel Antonio Gutiérrez to the government. Facundo Quiroga marched with his militias on Catamarca, where he deposed the governor and then prevailed in Tucumán, San Juan, and Santiago del Estero, finally defeating Lamadrid at the Battle of Rincón de Valladares on 6 July 1827. Quiroga thus became the arbiter of power relations in the northwest. By early 1827, the vast majority of provinces rejected both the constitution and the president.

==== Loss of the Banda Oriental (Independence of Uruguay) ====
Rivadavia again turned to Manuel José García and sent him on a diplomatic mission to Brazil to begin negotiations for peace with the Empire. The reasons that led Rivadavia to change his position were the same that had earlier discouraged García from supporting the war, and here the important investigative work of Juan Carlos Nicolau should be noted:

The economic situation of Brazil was far superior to that of the United Provinces, considering that it had a population of 5 million inhabitants compared with 700,000 for the latter taken as a whole, though in reality only the province of Buenos Aires contributed to the war effort. The Brazilian state, independent and without national debt, maintained a very active and flourishing foreign trade, in constant progress, supported by its relationship with Great Britain. In contrast, the Río de la Plata suffered from the blockade of its port, which constituted a serious obstacle to obtaining resources from customs revenues and thus to acquiring arms and ammunition for its army.
The assistance Brazil received from Great Britain in their virtual alliance led figures such as General William Carr Beresford and Admiral Thomas Cochrane—both with extensive knowledge of the Río de la Plata theater of operations—to contribute to the organization and management of the Brazilian army and navy.

On 16 April 1827, García received instructions from Rivadavia and his minister Francisco Fernández de la Cruz, informing him that the government intended to accelerate the end of the war. The bases that the plenipotentiary minister García was to use were:

... either the return of the Oriental Province, or the erection and recognition of that territory as a separate, free, and independent state under the form and rules that its own inhabitants might choose and sanction; in this latter case neither of the belligerent parties should demand compensation.

In other words, President Rivadavia instructed the plenipotentiary minister García that peace with Brazil should be achieved either through recognition by the emperor of the Oriental Province as an integral part of the United Provinces of the Río de la Plata, or, if that was not accepted, through the proclamation of the independence of the Oriental Province.

García arrived in May 1827 in Rio de Janeiro and began meetings with the British intermediary and Brazilian plenipotentiary ministers. At the outset of negotiations García encountered strong resistance from Brazilian ministers regarding any renunciation of the Cisplatine Province. Emperor Pedro I of Brazil had sworn before the Brazilian Senate not to negotiate peace with the United Provinces and to continue the war until they accepted his sovereignty over the Cisplatine Province.

Seeing the situation, García decided to return to Buenos Aires, but the British ambassador Robert Gordon persuaded him to meet with the imperial foreign minister, the Marquis of Queluz. After three fruitless meetings, pressure from the British government to end the conflict quickly in order to resume trade, the inflexible position of the Brazilian government, and the critical political and economic situation of the United Provinces led García to decide on peace on different terms. He later explained to Ambassador Gordon:

[...] although he had instructions to sign a convention only on the basis of the independence of the province of Montevideo; but, as he was convinced that such independence could not be achieved for some time, and that in reality the fate of the province mattered little to Buenos Aires provided tranquility was restored, he did not hesitate to reach terms that, in another sense, were perfectly consistent with his instructions.

Thus, setting aside his instructions, on 24 May 1827 he signed the Preliminary Peace Convention of 1827, which provided, among other things:

The Republic of the United Provinces of the Río de la Plata recognizes the independence and integrity of the Empire of Brazil and renounces all rights it might claim to the territory of the province of Montevideo, now called Cisplatina, which the Emperor undertakes to organize with the greatest care, or even better than other provinces of the Empire. The Emperor of Brazil likewise recognizes the independence and integrity of the Republic of the United Provinces of the Río de la Plata, and since the Republic has employed privateers, it considers it just and honorable to pay the value of the prizes for acts of piracy.

Although this Preliminary Peace Convention contradicted his instructions, García managed to change the original wording that incorporated the Cisplatine Province into the Empire and omitted recognition of any Brazilian sovereignty over the Oriental Province, since the convention referred only to the renunciation made by the United Provinces. Perhaps without realizing it, Brazilian diplomats left the door open to Uruguayan independence.

Upon his return to Buenos Aires on 20 June 1827, García presented the Preliminary Peace Convention to President Rivadavia and the National Congress. The plan was rejected by the government of the United Provinces: Minister Agüero wrote García that:

Consequently, the government holds you responsible for all the evils and consequences that result for the nation, especially in the great and noble endeavor in which it is engaged to save its honor.

Nevertheless, Rivadavia failed to save his government: despite his opposition to the convention, public opinion did not forgive his actions, and his involvement in mining negotiations in Famatina was simultaneously denounced in the press. On 26 June 1827, Rivadavia presented his irrevocable resignation from the presidency.

The consequences of the failed Preliminary Peace Convention signed by García remain controversial: some authors believe that the precedent of such an agreement influenced Governor Manuel Dorrego when signing the Preliminary Peace Convention of 1828, which provided for the independence of the "Province of Montevideo, now called Cisplatina". Others argue that García cannot be held responsible for the final treaty signed by Juan Ramón Balcarce and Tomás Guido, since the preliminary convention was never ratified by Congress and therefore did not bind the government of the United Provinces of the Río de la Plata.

== Exile and death ==
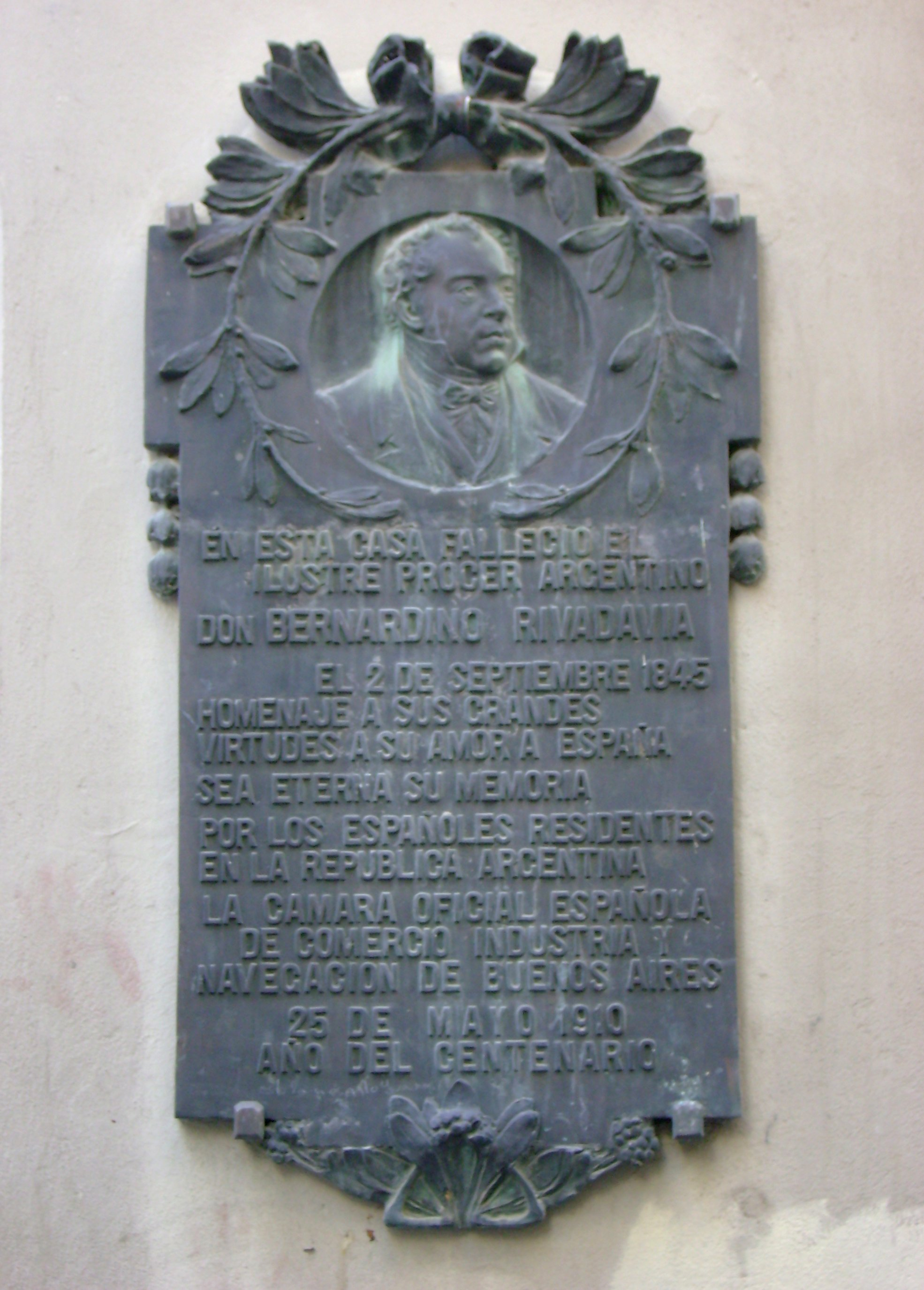
Plaque honoring Bernardino Rivadavia in Cádiz, Spain.

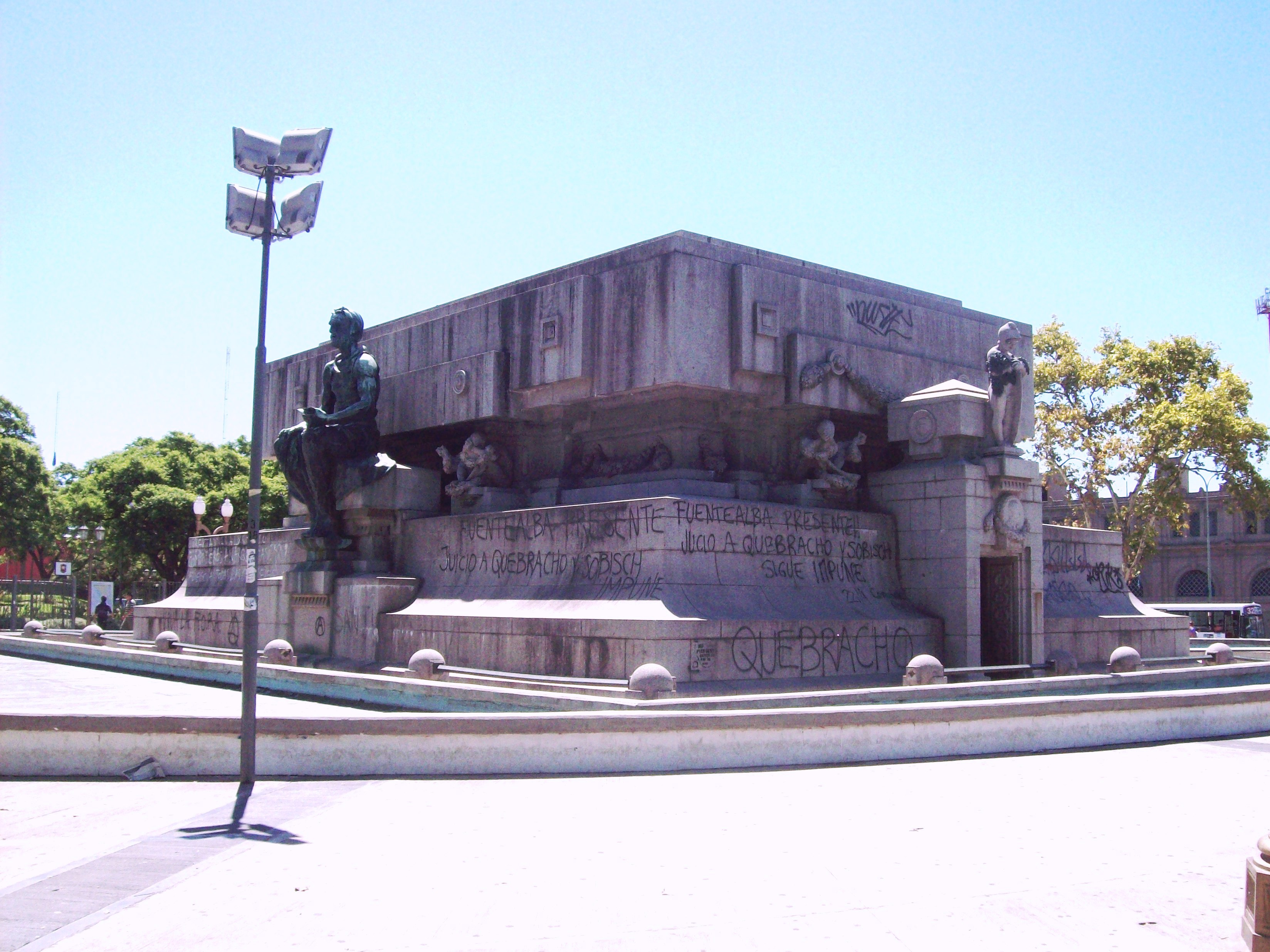
Mausoleum of Bernardino Rivadavia in Plaza Miserere, Buenos Aires.

After resigning the presidency, Bernardino Rivadavia departed for Spain. Suspected of conspiring against the American cause in favor of a monarchy headed by a European prince, he returned to the country in 1834 intending to confront his political enemies and defend himself, but the governor of Buenos Aires, Juan José Viamonte, did not allow him to disembark and sentenced him again to exile. As a result, he first settled in Mercedes (Soriano Department, Uruguay) and later in Colonia del Sacramento, Uruguay. In that country he was a pioneer of beekeeping, introducing two French hives, of which only one prospered and produced new swarms that generated honey and wax.

He was eventually deported to the Isla de Ratas as a prelude to a new exile with a stop in Santa Catarina. He later departed for Rio de Janeiro, where his wife died in 1841.

He returned definitively to Spain at the end of 1842, dying there in the city of Cádiz on 2 September 1845 at the age of 65.

== Repatriation of his remains and tributes ==
Although in his will Bernardino Rivadavia requested that his remains not be buried in Buenos Aires or Montevideo,

not be buried in Buenos Aires, and even less in Montevideo

they were repatriated in 1857, when the government rendered him the honors of a captain general before a crowd estimated at 60,000 people. That same year it was decided to name Avenida Rivadavia, the longest avenue in Buenos Aires, after him. Initially, his remains rested in the La Recoleta Cemetery.

Bartolomé Mitre described Rivadavia as:

the greatest civilian figure of the Argentine lands.

At present his remains are in a mausoleum located in the Plaza Miserere, in Buenos Aires, adjacent to Rivadavia Avenue, named in his honor.

== Legacy ==
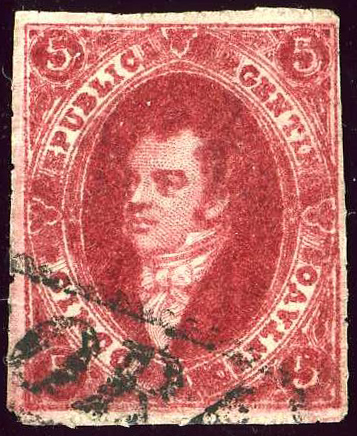
Rivadavia is portrayed on Argentina stamps since 1864.

Rivadavia is recognized as the first president of Argentina, even though his rule was accepted only in Buenos Aires, he did not complete a full mandate, there was no constitution for more than half of his rule, and did not start a presidential succession line. The chair of the President of Argentina is known as the "chair of Rivadavia", but only metaphorically: Rivadavia took everything when he left office, including the chair, which could never be retrieved.

Liberal historians praise Rivadavia as a great historical man, for his work improving education, culture and separation of church and state. Revisionist authors condemn his Anglophilia, the weak customs barriers that allowed the entry of big British imports (which the revisionists believed harmed the weak Argentine economy of the time), and the Baring Brothers loan that started the Argentine external debt.

== Bibliography ==
- Ferrer, Aldo (1967). La economía argentina [The Argentine Economy] (in Spanish). Buenos Aires: Fondo de Cultura Económica.
- Galasso, Norberto (2011). Historia de la Argentina [History of Argentina] (in Spanish). Buenos Aires: Colihue.
- Luna, Félix (1999). Grandes protagonistas de la historia argentina: Bernardino Rivadavia [Great Protagonists of Argentine History: Bernardino Rivadavia]. Argentina: Grupo Editorial Planeta. ISBN 978-950-49-0429-8.
- Mendelevich, Pablo (2010). El Final [The End]. Buenos Aires: Ediciones B. ISBN 978-987-627-166-0.

Political offices
Preceded by None	President of Argentina; 1826–1827	Succeeded by Vicente López y Planes
