= América, Argentina =

City in Buenos Aires Province, Argentina

America
- City
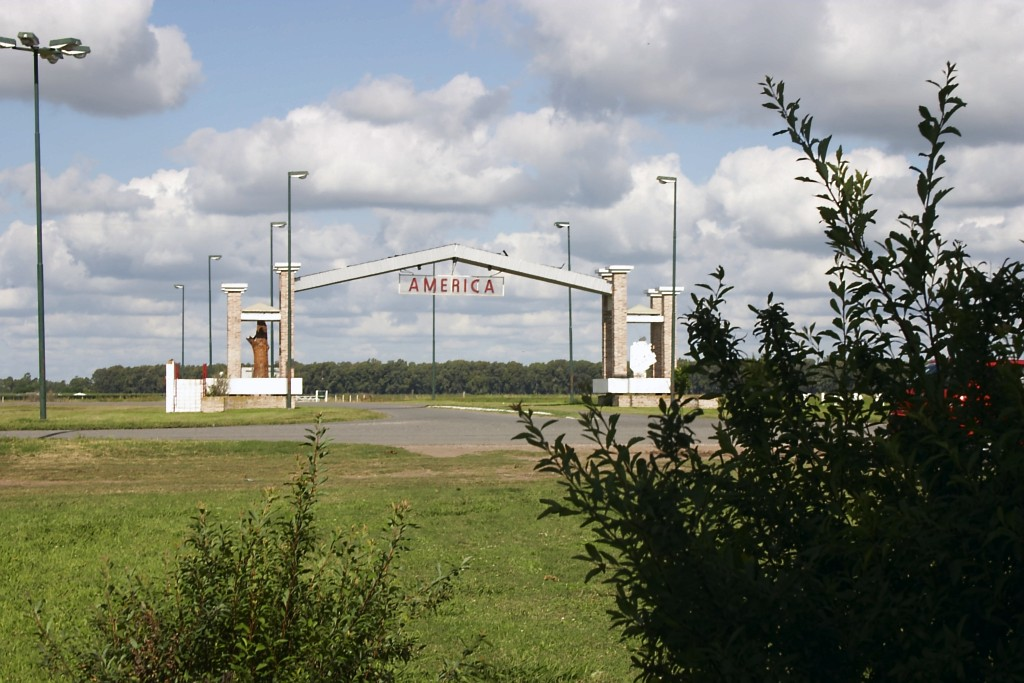
- Arch

- Location in Argentina
- Coordinates: 35°29′S 62°58′W
- Country: Argentina
- Province: Buenos Aires
- Partido: Rivadavia
- Founded: 16 May 1904
- Elevation: 101 m (331 ft)

Population (2010 census [INDEC])
  - Total: 11,685
- Demonym: Ameriquense
- CPA Base: B 6237
- Area code: +54 2337

América is a city in Buenos Aires Province, Argentina, and the head town of the Rivadavia Partido, located some 500 km (311 mi) from Buenos Aires City and 560 km (348 mi) from the provincial capital, La Plata.

Its population was, as per the 2010 census, 11,685.

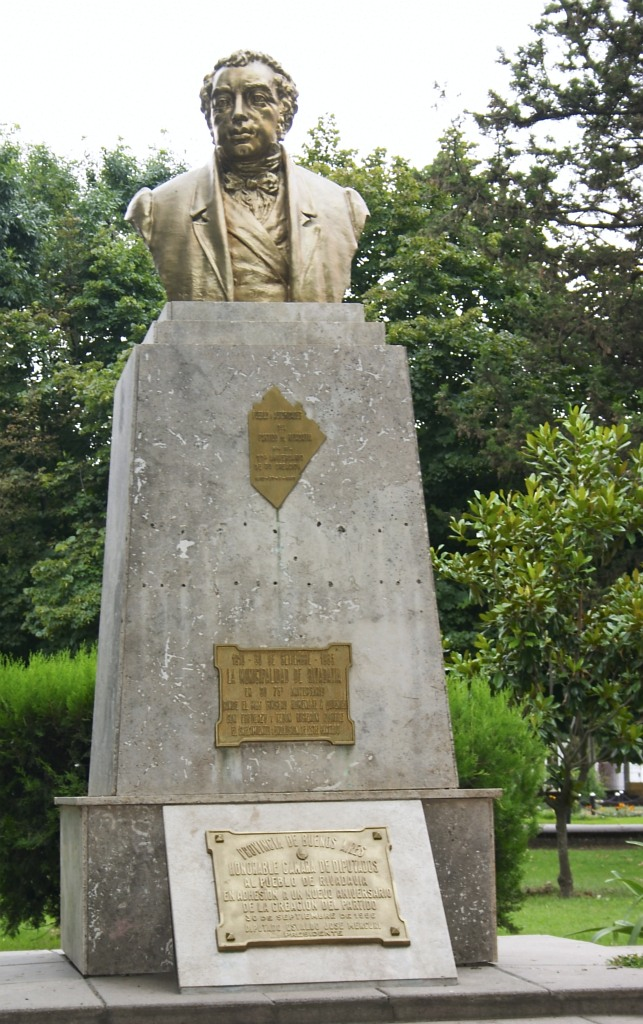

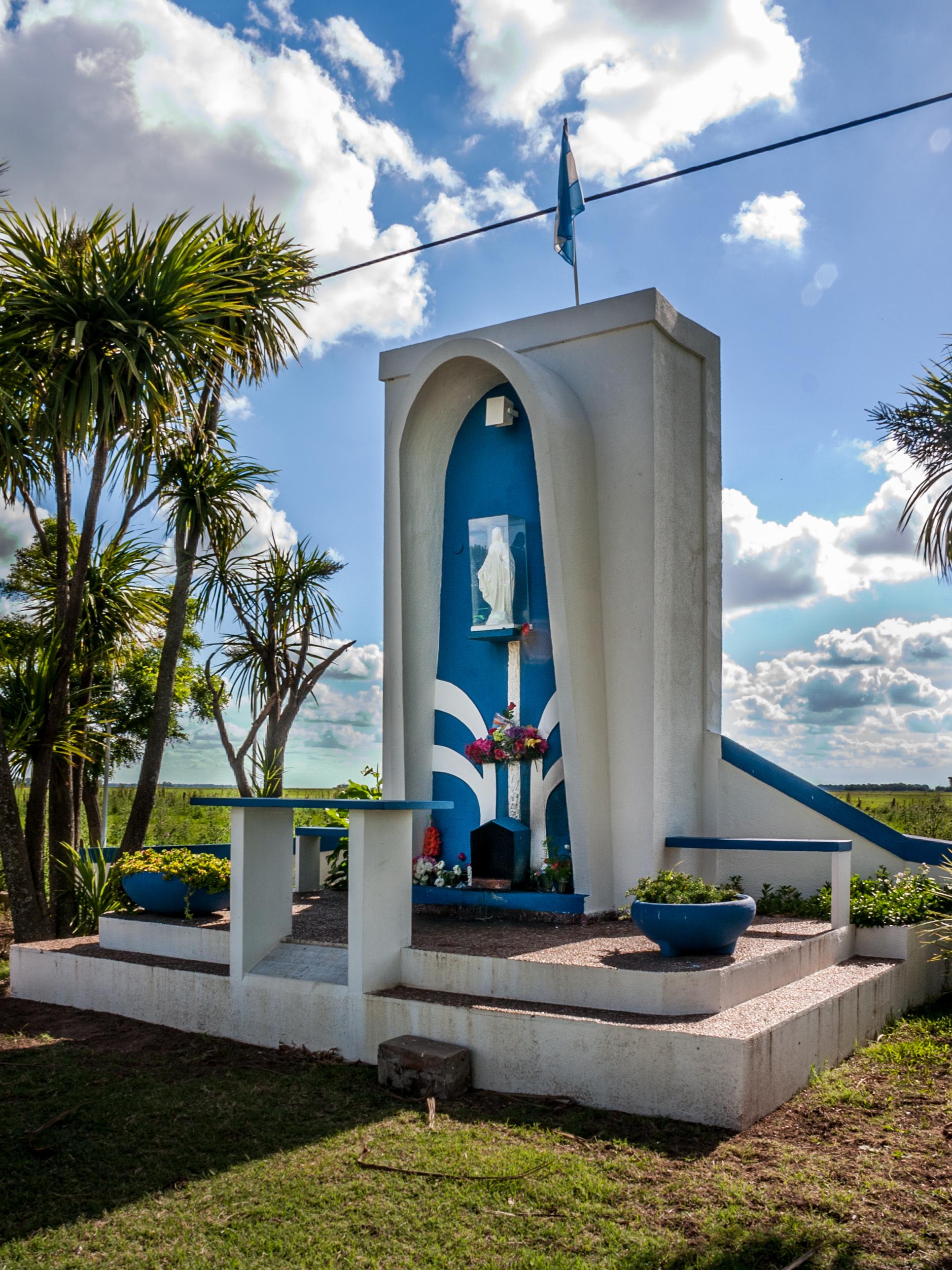

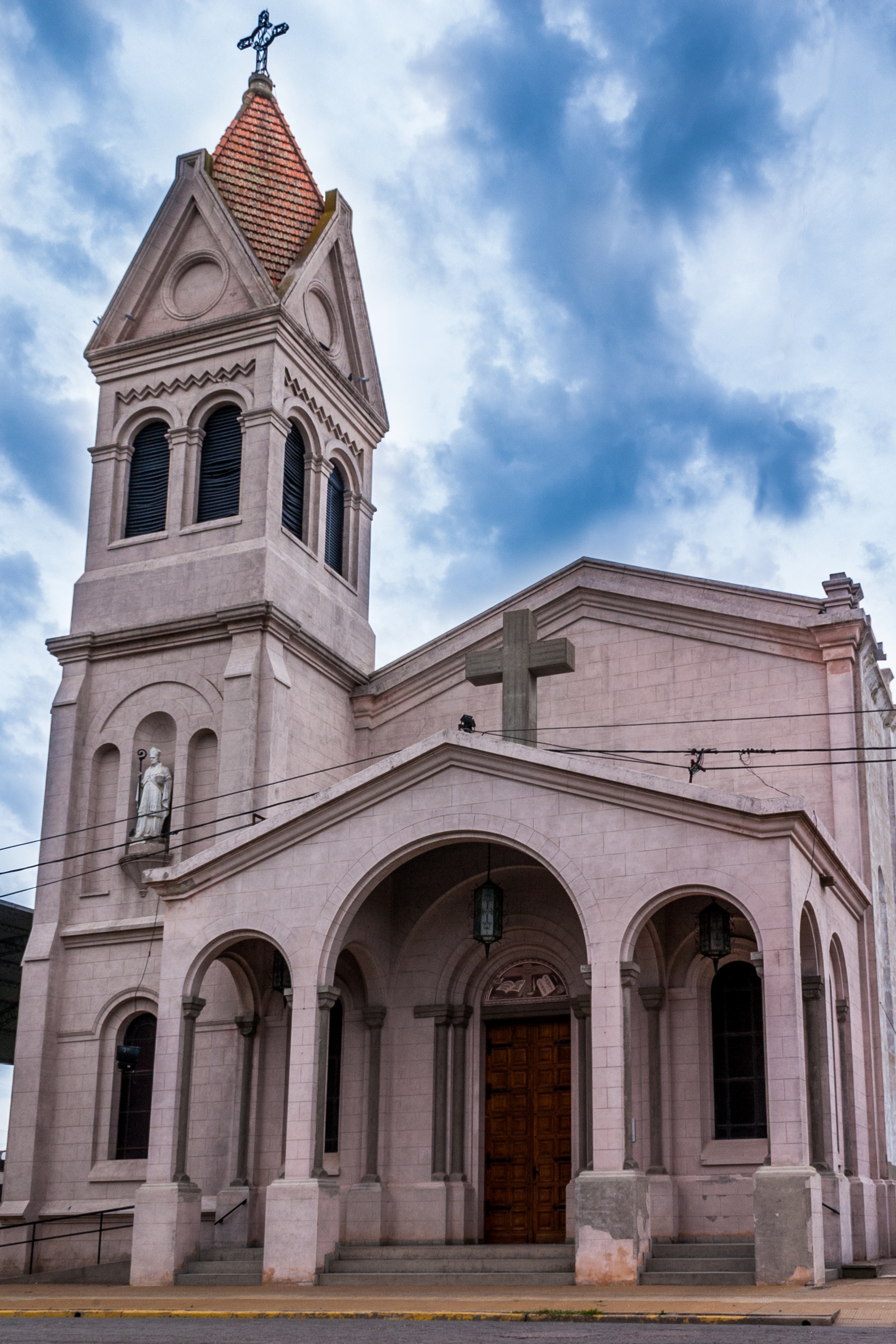

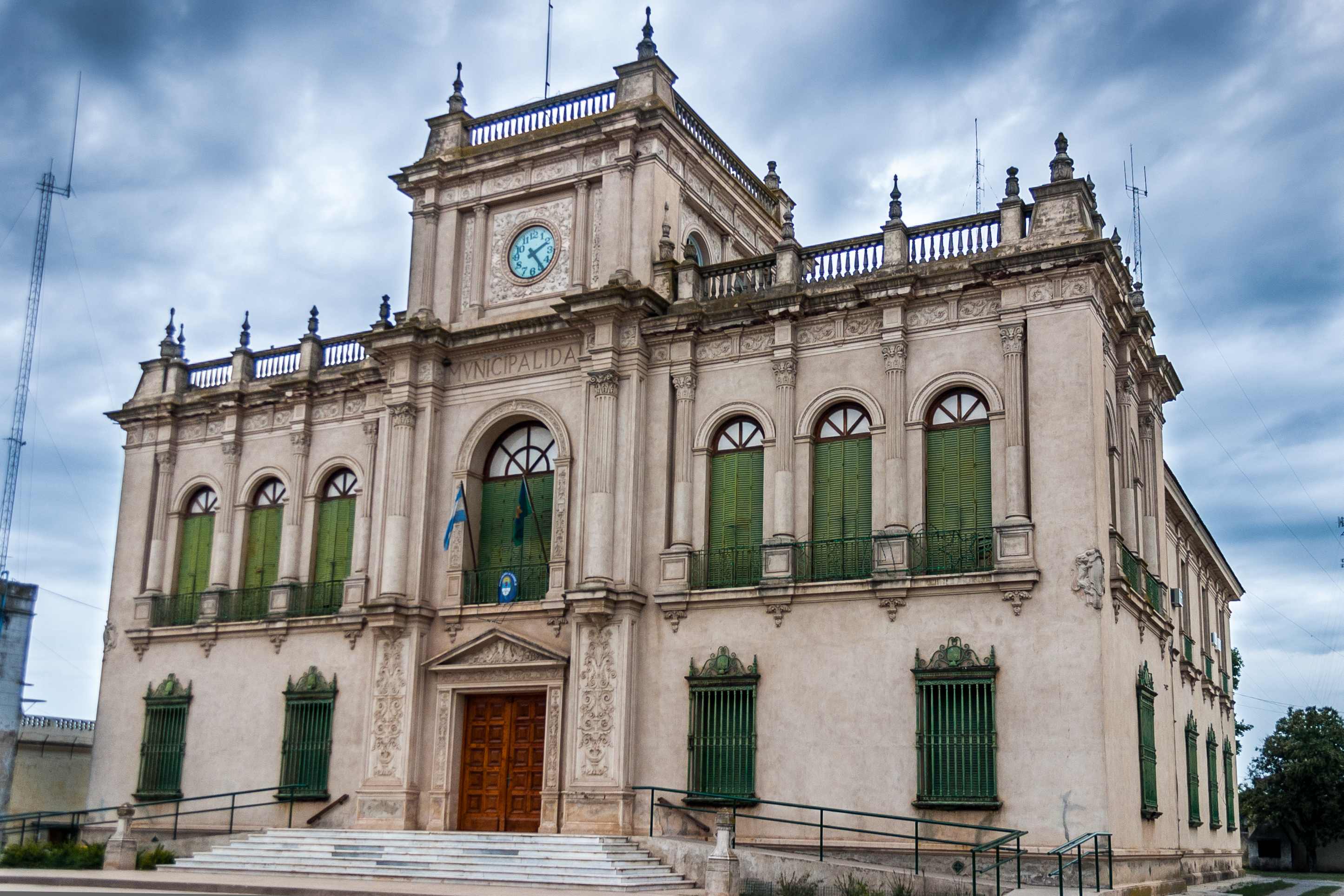

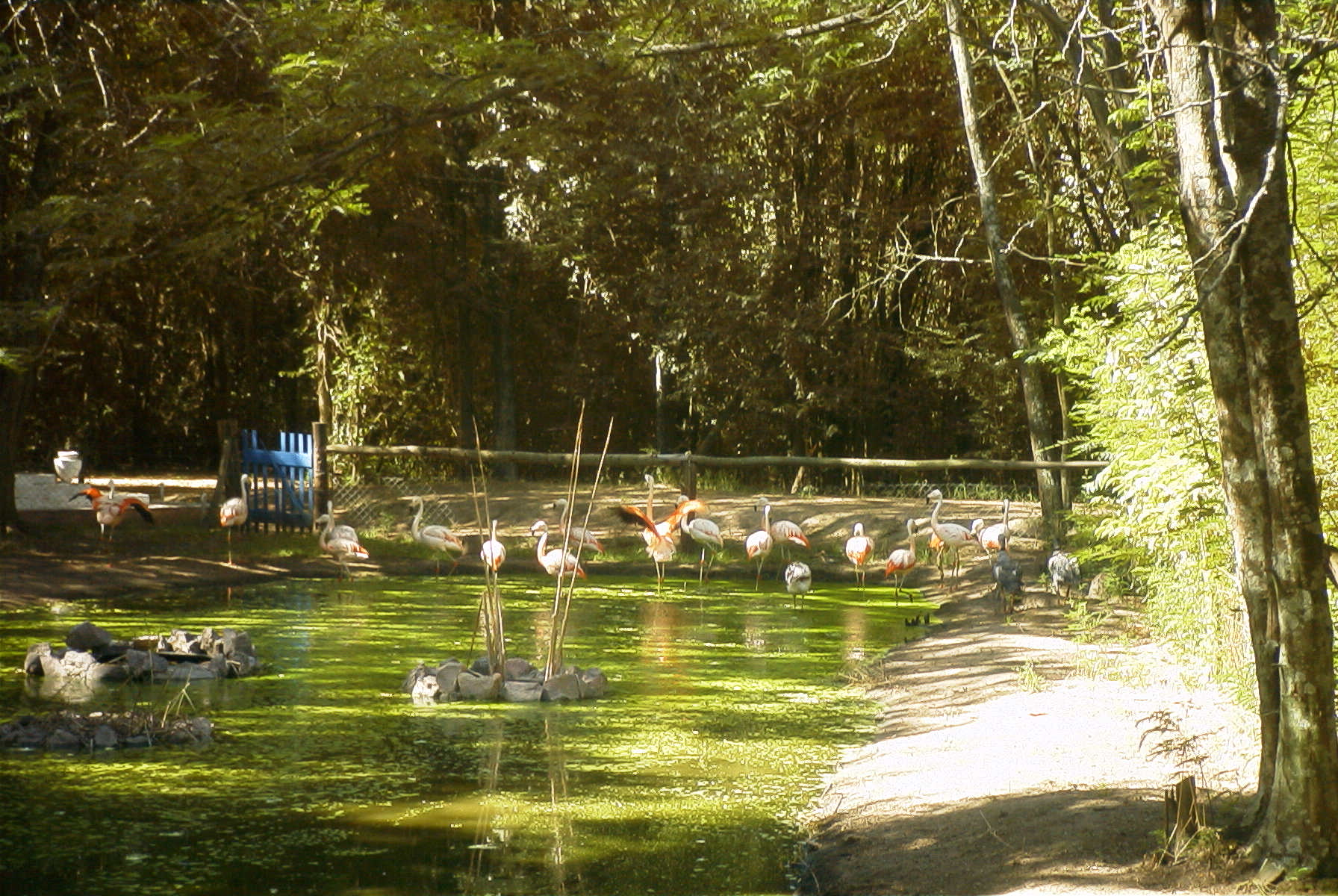

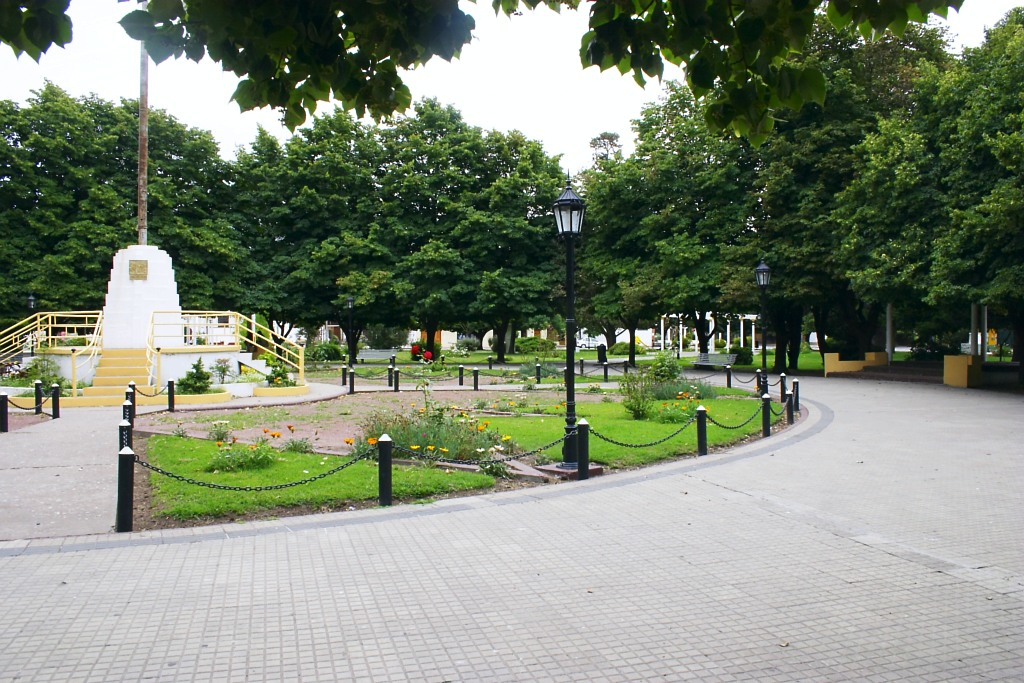

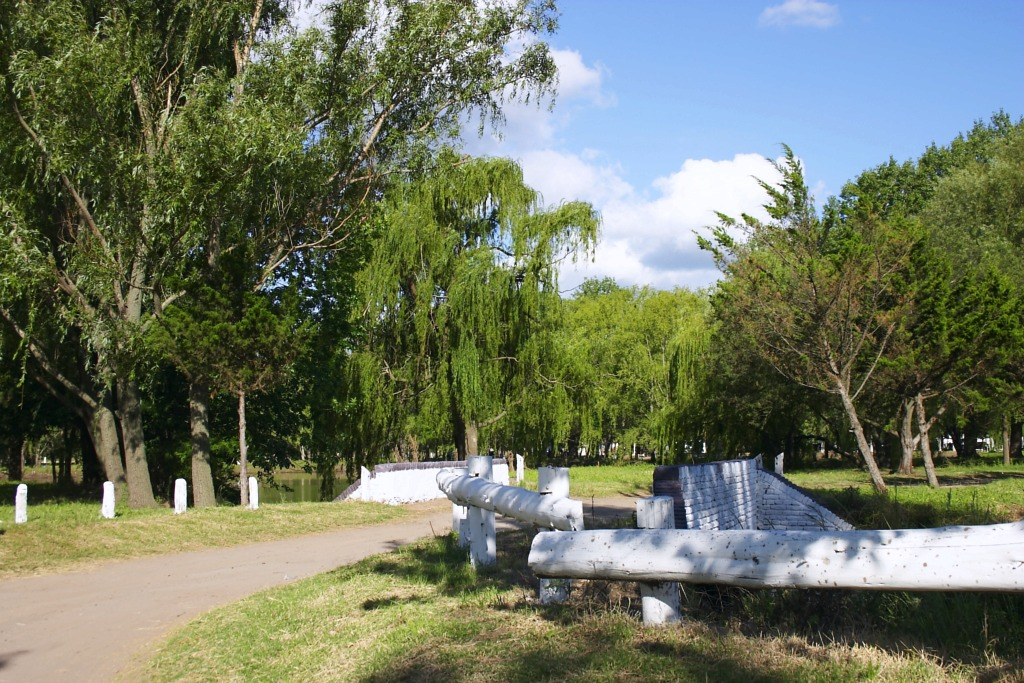

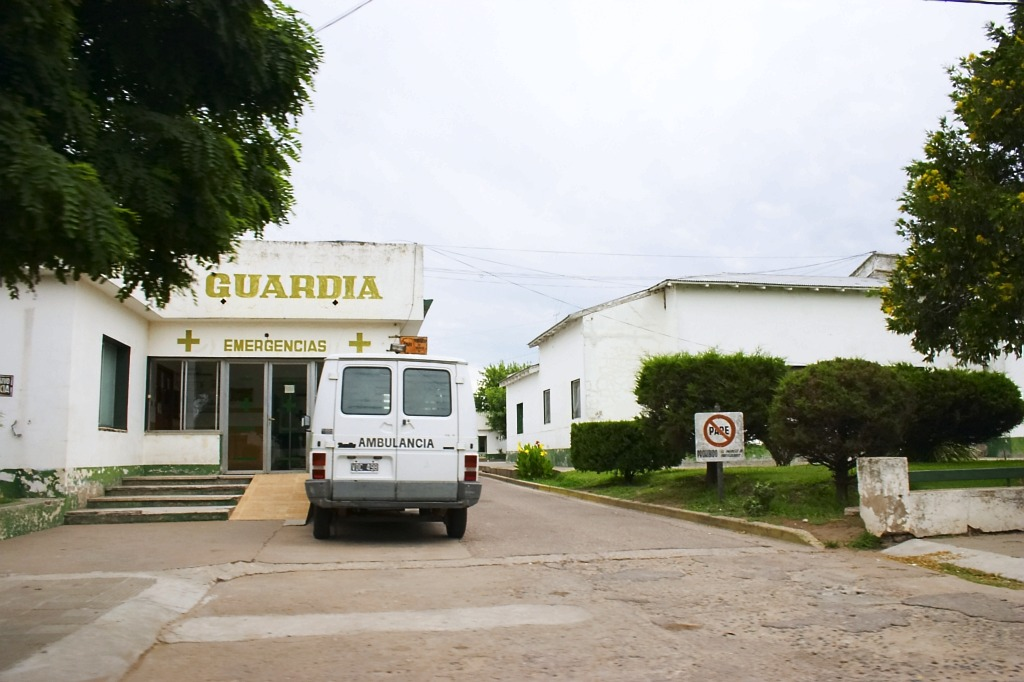
