= Roberto Marcelo Levingston =

President of Argentina from 1970 to 1971

Brigadier General Roberto Marcelo Levingston
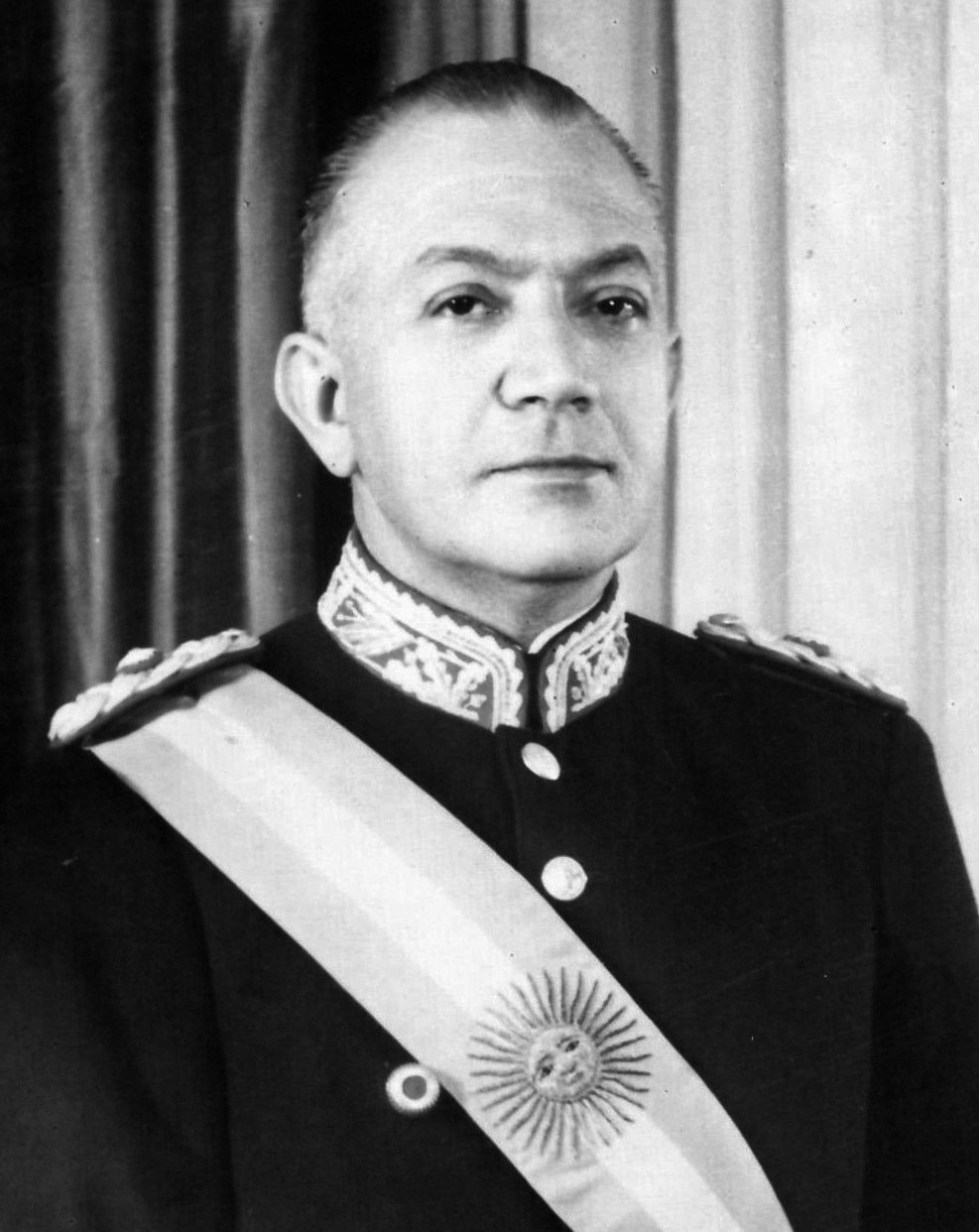
- Levingston in 1970

36th President of Argentina
- In office 18 June 1970 – 23 March 1971
- Vice President: None
- Preceded by: Juan Carlos Onganía
- Succeeded by: Alejandro Agustín Lanusse

Personal details
- Born: 10 January 1920 San Luis, Argentina
- Died: 17 June 2015 (aged 95) Buenos Aires, Argentina
- Party: Independent
- Spouse: Bety Nelly Andrés Llana de Levingston
- Children: 3
- Profession: Military
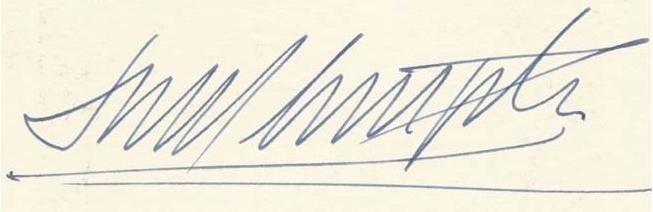
- Signature

Military service
- Allegiance: Argentina
- Branch/service: Argentine Army
- Years of service: 1938–1971
- Rank: Brigadier general
- Commands: Argentine Army
- Battles/wars: Argentine Revolution

Roberto Marcelo Levingston Laborda (10 January 1920 – 17 June 2015) was an Argentine Army general who was the 36th President of Argentina from 1970 to 1971. His presidency was marked by a protectionist economic policy amid the country's financial struggles, and the imposition of the death penalty against terrorists and kidnappers.

== Early life and education ==
Levingston was born on 10 January 1920 in San Luis Province. He was the son of Guillermo David Levingston Sierralta and Carmen Laborda Guiñazú. After completing his secondary studies, Levingston attended the Colegio Militar de la Nación starting in 1938, where he graduated from in 1941. He chose to pursue the branch of cavalry officer at the college, and upon graduating became a second lieutenant of cavalry. In January 1948 he obtained the rank of captain after having previously been promoted to first lieutenant.

== Presidency ==
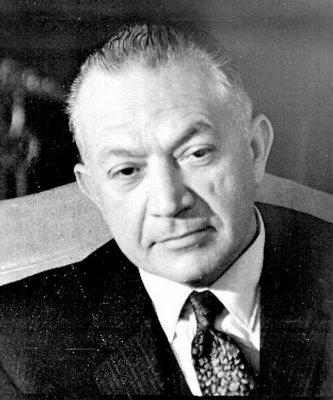
Levingston in civilian clothing

Levingston's military expertise included intelligence and counterinsurgency, and he took the presidency of Argentina on 18 June 1970, in a military coup engineered by commander-in-chief Alejandro Lanusse that deposed Juan Carlos Onganía over his ineffective response to the Montoneros and other guerillas. Lanusse later called Levingston's appointment as a "barbarity" while defending the decision at the time, saying that "it was done so as to avoid what had been happening" under Onganía.

His regime was marked by a protectionist economic policy that did little to overcome the inflation and recession that the country was undergoing at the time, and by the imposition of the death penalty against terrorists and kidnappers. In response to renewed anti-government rioting in Córdoba, the labor crisis under his leadership, and his attempt to dismiss Lanusse, he was deposed on 21 March 1971, by another military junta led by Lanusse.

== Death ==
He died on 17 June 2015, at the age of 95. He is the longest-lived President of Argentina.

== Personal life ==
In 1943, Levingston married Bety Nelly Andrés and had two sons and one daughter.

== Cabinet ==
Levingston's cabinet underwent several changes during his brief presidency, with key ministerial positions experiencing turnover particularly in October 1970.

Cabinet of Roberto Marcelo Levingston
Ministry	Minister	Period
Ministry of Interior	Eduardo Mac Loughlin Arturo Cordón Aguirre	18 June 1970 – 13 October 1970 15 October 1970 – 23 March 1971
Ministry of Foreign Affairs and Worship	Luis María de Pablo Pardo	18 June 1970 – 23 March 1971
Ministry of Economy and Labor	Carlos Moyano Llerena Aldo Ferrer	18 June 1970 – 15 October 1970 26 October 1970 – 23 March 1971
Ministry of Education	José Luis Cantini	18 June 1970 – 23 March 1971
Ministry of Social Welfare	Francisco Manrique Amadeo Frúgoli	18 June 1970 – 9 February 1971 10 February 1971 – 23 March 1971
Ministry of Defense	José R. Cáceres Monié	18 June 1970 – 23 March 1971
Ministry of Justice	Jaime Perriaux	18 June 1970 – 23 March 1971
Ministry of Public Works and Services	Aldo Ferrer Oscar Colombo	18 June 1970 – 26 October 1970 26 October 1970 – 23 March 1971
